= Jin Yuzhang =

Head of the House of Aisin-Gioro since 2015

Jin Yuzhang: 金毓嶂

Head of the House of Aisin-Gioro
- Period: 10 April 2015 – present
- Predecessor: Jin Youzhi
- Born: 3 May 1942 (age 84); Beijing, Republic of China
- Issue: Jin Xin
Names
- Jin Yuzhang (金毓嶂)
- House: Aisin-Gioro
- Father: Jin Youzhi

Jin Yuzhang (Chinese: 金毓嶂, born May 3, 1942) is a Chinese civil servant, politician and former nobleman. He is the current head of the House of Aisin-Gioro, the ruling house of the Qing dynasty, and is heir apparent to the defunct throne of the Monarchy of China.

His father was Manchu nobleman Jin Youzhi, and he is a nephew of Puyi, the Xuantong Emperor and last monarch of the Qing dynasty of China.

== Biography ==
Jin was born in Beijing on 3 May 1942. His father, Prince Puren, was the youngest brother of Puyi. Puyi was the last emperor of the Qing dynasty and later became emperor of Manchukuo, a Japanese puppet state in northeastern China.

Jin was educated at the China University of Geosciences. After graduation, he worked at the Qinghai Bureau of Geology and Mineral Resources from 1968 to 1985, before returning to Beijing to work at the Chongwen district's Bureau of Environmental Protection.

Jin is not a member of the Chinese Communist Party, but has served on various elected assemblies as a non-partisan member. In 1999, he was elected to the Beijing People's Political Consultative Conference. He retired as vice-director of the Chongwen district government in Beijing in 2008.

In 2013, the book Shēng zhèngfèng shí: Qīng huángzú hòuyì Jīn Yùzhàng kǒushù jiāzú shǐ (生正逢时：清皇族后裔金毓嶂口述家族史; roughly, “Born at the Right Time: The Oral Family History of Jin Yuzhang, a Descendant of the Qing Imperial Family”) was published. The book is based on Jin Yuzhang's oral recollections and was compiled and edited by the Dongcheng District Archives of Beijing.

== Personal life ==
Jin married an ethnic Han Chinese woman, Liu Yumin, in 1974. They have a daughter, Jin Xin (金鑫; b. 1976). Jin's daughter graduated from university with a major in computer science. She is a member of the Chinese People's Political Consultative Conference in the Dongcheng District of Beijing, and is also a famous painter.

== Honors ==
In December 2022, Jin won the "Jinghua Concentric Award" as a member of the 13th CPPCC.

== Ancestry ==
Ancestors of Jin Yuzhang

16. Daoguang Emperor
8. Yixuan
17. Imperial Noble Consort Zhuangshun
4. Zaifeng
18. Deqing (德慶)
9. Lady Lingiya
2. Puren
5. Lady Dengiya
1. Jin Yuzhang
3. Zhang Maoying

=== Patrilineal descent ===
Patrilineal descent

This patrilineal line shows that Jin Yuzhang was a descendant of rulers of Qing dynasty and ultimately from Odoli tribe. The patrilineal line traced back to Bukūri Yongšon.

1. Bukūri Yongšon
2. ?
3. Fancha, Million of Woduoli Mansion
4. Huihou
5. Möngke Temür, Chieftain of Jianzhou Jurchens, 1370–1433
6. Cungšan, Chieftain of Jianzhou Jurchens, 1419–1467
7. Sibeoci Fiyanggū, Chieftain of Jianzhou Jurchens, d. 1522
8. Fuman, Chieftain of Jianzhou Jurchens, d. 1542
9. Giocangga, Chieftain of Jianzhou Jurchens, 1526–1583
10. Taksi, Chieftain of Jianzhou Jurchens, 1543–1583
11. Nurhaci, Khan of Later Jin, 1559–1626
12. Hong Taiji, Emperor of Qing Dynasty, 1592–1643
13. Shunzhi, Emperor of Qing Dynasty, 1638–1661
14. Kangxi, Emperor of Qing Dynasty, 1654–1722
15. Yongzheng, Emperor of Qing Dynasty, 1678–1735
16. Qianlong, Emperor of Qing Dynasty, 1711–1799
17. Jiaqing, Emperor of Qing Dynasty, 1760–1820
18. Daoguang, Emperor of Qing Dynasty, 1782–1850
19. Yixuan, Prince Chun of the First Rank, 1840–1891
20. Zaifeng, Prince Regent of Qing Dynasty, 1883–1951
21. Jin Youzhi, 1918–2015
22. Jin Yuzhang, b. 1942

Jin Yuzhang House of Qing
Chinese royalty
Preceded by Jin Youzhi	— TITULAR — Head of House of Aisin-Gioro; 10 April 2015 – present Reason for succession failure: Empire abolished in 1912	Incumbent; Heir: Jin Yuquan
