= Cuyan =

Ming dynasty Jianzhou Jurchen leader

Names
- Aisin-Gioro Cuyan (愛新覺羅·褚宴)
- House: Aisin-Gioro
- Father: Mengtemu

Cuyan
- Chinese: 褚宴
Transcriptions
Standard Mandarin
- Hanyu Pinyin: Chǔyàn

Cuyan (Manchu: ᠴᡠᠶᠠᠨ, romanized: cuyan), also rendered as Cheuk Yan (綽顏), was a leader of the Jianzhou Jurchens during the Ming dynasty. He was born in Hetu Ala. He was Nurhaci's fifth generation grand uncle.

== History ==
The second son of Mengtemu, Cungšan's brother. In 1433, when his father and his brother Agu were killed by Mutahu in Seven Surnames of the Savages (七姓野人), Cuyan and his brother Cungšan were attached to their uncle Fanca. In 1446, the Ming Dynasty seal Cuyan for fuqianhu of Jianzhou Left Defense (建州左衛). The birth and death is unknown, "Draft History of Qing" (清史稿) recorded in the early death.

== Family ==
=== Father ===
Mengtemu (孟特穆)

=== Brother ===
- Agu (阿古)
- Cungšan (充善)

=== Nephew ===
- Tolo (妥羅)
- Toimo (妥義謨)
- Sibeoci Fiyanggū (錫寶齊篇古)

== Bibliography ==
- "Draft History of Qing" (清史稿)/Volume 1
- The same book/Volume 161
- The same book/Volume 222
