= Taksi =

Jurchen chieftain and father of Nurhaci

Taksi (Manchu: ᡨᠠᡴᠰᡳ; Chinese: 塔克世; pinyin: Tǎkèshì; 1543–1583), or posthumously titled as Emperor Xuan, was a Jurchen chieftain and father of Nurhaci, founder of the Later Jin dynasty, and the fourth son of Giocangga. A member of the House of Aisin-Gioro, he was killed in an attack on Gure (古哷 Gǔlè) by a rival Jurchen chieftain Nikan Wailan in 1583.

Taksi had nine recorded children. Nurhaci was the first born son and also the most highly achieved. It seems like several of Nurhaci's brothers had names that closely resembled his phonetically.

The Seven Grievances issued by Nurhaci claimed that the Ming dynasty killed Taksi for no reason. This caused Nurhaci to declare war on the Ming, which eventually led to the destruction of the Ming and rise of the Qing dynasty.

During the reign of the Shunzhi Emperor, the court of the Qing dynasty retroactively gave Taksi the temple name Xianzu (顯祖) and the posthumous name Emperor Xuan (宣皇帝).

== Family ==
Wife

- Empress Xuan, of the Hitara clan (宣皇后 喜塔臘氏; d. 1569), second cousin, personal name Emeci (額穆齊)
  - Nurhaci, Taizu (太祖 努爾哈赤; 8 April 1559 – 30 September 1626), first son
  - Šurhaci, Prince Zhuang of the First Rank (莊親王 舒爾哈齊; 1564 – 25 September 1611), third son
  - Yarhaci, Prince Tongda of the Second Rank (通達郡王 雅爾哈齊; 1565–1589), fourth son
  - Princess Jing'an of the Second Rank (和碩静安公主; d. 23 October 1624), personal name Janhegu (沾河姑), second daughter
    - Married Gahašan Hashū (噶哈善哈思虎; 1560–1584) of the Manchu Irgen Gioro clan in September/October 1583
    - Married Yangšu (揚書) of the Manchu Gorolo (郭絡羅) clan in 1585, and had issue (three sons)
- Second wife, of the Hada Nara clan (哈達那拉氏), personal name Kenje (懇哲)
  - Bayara, Prince Duyi Gangguo of the Third Rank (篤義剛果貝勒 巴雅喇; 1582 – March/April 1624), fifth son

Concubine

- Mistress, of the Ligiya clan (李佳氏)
  - Murhaci, Prince Chengyi Yongzhuang of the Third Rank (誠毅勇壯貝勒 穆爾哈齊; 1561 – September/October 1620), second son
- Princess Jantai (詹泰格格), of the Janggiya clan (章佳氏)
  - First daughter
    - Married Changzhu (常柱) of the Manchu Ula Nara clan, and had issue (one son)

== Ancestry ==
Mengtemu (1370-1433)
Cungšan (1419–1467)
Sibeoci Fiyanggū
Fuman
Giocangga (1526–1583)
Duligin
Empress Zhi
Taksi (1543–1583)
Empress Yi

== See also ==
- Chinese emperors family tree (late)

Taksi House of Aisin-Gioro Born: 1543 Died: 1583
Regnal titles
Preceded by Giocangga	Chieftain of the Jianzhou Jurchens; 1571–1583	Succeeded by Nurhaci
