= Toimo =

Names
- Aisin-Gioro Toimo (愛新覺羅·妥義謨)
- House: Aisin Gioro
- Father: Cungšan

Toimo
- Chinese: 妥義謨
Transcriptions
Standard Mandarin
- Hanyu Pinyin: Tuǒyímó

Toimo (Manchu: ᡨᠣᡳᠮᠣ, romanized: toimo;?–?) The ancestors of the Qing dynasty. He is the second son of Cungšan, Nurhaci's great-great-great-granduncle. His family name is Aisin Gioro (愛新覺羅).

== History ==
The leader of the Jianzhou Nüzhen (建州女真) in the Ming dynasty, He was Tolo's brother, the older brother of Sibeoci Fiyanggū, Sibeoci Fiyanggū was Nurhaci's great-great-grandfather. In the time of birth and death due righteousness is unknown, about life in Chenghua (成化) years, died without an heir.

== Family ==
- Paternal Grandfather: Mentemu (孟特穆)
  - Father: Cungšan (充善)
  - Uncle: Chu Yan (褚宴)

=== Brother ===
- The eldest brother: Tolo (妥羅)
- Three younger brother: Sibeoci Fiyanggū (錫寶齊篇古)

== Bibliography ==
- "Draft History of Qing" (清史稿)/Volume 1
- The same book/Volume 161
