= List of Jurchen chieftains =

The Jurchens were a Tungusic people who inhabited the region of Manchuria (present-day Northeast China) until the 17th century, when they adopted the name Manchu.

== List of Jurchen chieftains during the Liao dynasty (926–1115) ==
=== "Wild" Jurchens or Sheng Jurchen (生女眞) ===
- Wanyan Hanpu 完顏函普 (金始祖) (941–960)
- Wanyan Wulu 完顏烏魯 (金德帝) (960–962)
- Wanyan Bahai 完顏跋海 (金安帝) (962–983).
- Wanyan Suike 完顏綏可 (金獻祖) (983–1005): In 1003, under his leadership the Wanyan tribe united five tribes in a federation called the "Five Nations" (wuguobu 五國部: Punuli (蒲努里/蒲奴里/蒲聶), Tieli 鐵驪, Yuelidu (越裡篤國), Aolimi (奧里米國), and Puali 剖阿里國).
- Wanyan Shilu 完顏石魯 (金昭祖) (1005–1021)
- Wanyan Wugunai 完顏烏古迺 (金景祖) (1021–1074): Meanwhile, King Hyung ordered to continue and finish the work of building a wall (Cheolli Jangseong) from Song-ryung Pass (in the mouth of the Yalu River ner Uiju in the west to the borders of the Jurchen tribe in the north-east around Hamheung)
- Wanyan Helibo (完颜劾里钵) Shizu (金世祖) (1074–1092)
- Wanyan Pochishu 完顏頗剌淑 (金肅宗) (1092–1094)
- Wanyan Yingge (完颜盈歌) Muzong (金穆宗) (1094–1103)
- Wanyan Wuyashu (完顏烏雅束/完颜乌雅束) Kangzong (金康宗) b. 1061 (1103–1113)
- Wanyan Aguda (完颜阿骨打) Taizu (金太祖) b. 1068 (1113–1123)

== List of Jurchen chieftains during the Ming dynasty (1368–1644) ==
=== List of Jianzhou Jurchens chieftains ===
Located on the banks of Hun River(渾江)

==== Odoli Clan (1405–1616) (俄朵里 or 斡都里 or 斡朵里 or 吾都里 or 斡朵怜) ====
- Bukūri Yongšon (布库里雍顺)
- Mengtemu (孟特穆) or Möngke Temür (童孟哥帖木兒) (1405–1433) (Temple name: Zhàozǔ 肇祖)
- Cungšan (充善) b. 1419 (1433–1467) (Temple name: Chúndì 纯帝)
- Fanca († 1458)
- Tolo (妥罗) (1467–1481) (Temple name: Xīngdì 兴帝)
- Sibeoci Fiyanggū (锡宝齐篇古) (1481–1522) (Temple name: Zhèngdì 正帝)
- Fuman (福满) (1522–1542) (Temple name: Xingzu 兴祖)

==== Huligai Clan (胡里改) (1403–? ) ====
- Ahacu (阿哈出) (Li Sicheng) (李思誠) († 1409–1410)
- Šigiyanu 釋加奴 (Li-Hsien-chung/Li Xianzhong) (李顯忠)
- Li-Man-chu (Li Manzhu (李滿住) (b. 1407 – † 1467)

==== The Maolian (毛憐) Jurchens (1405–?) ====
Synonyms: Wu-liang-ha, Orankha, Oranke (兀良哈/乙良哈) according to Korean records, Orangai (瓦爾哈;オランカイ) according to Japanese records.
Location: They settled south of the Suifen River (绥芬河 or 速平江), on the north-west of Hui-ning under the leadership of one of Ahacu (阿哈出)'s sons.

==== Udige Clan (兀狄哈) ====
- They invaded Joseon territory in 1402, in 1410, in 1436 (see 곽승우(郭承祐) and 조연(趙涓)), in 1460 with the Oranke (see also 신숙주(申叔舟))
- They were beaten by the Korean General Heo Jong 허종(許琮) (1434–1494) in 1491, under Seongjong of Joseon's reign (see also 조산보(造山堡) and 나사종(羅嗣宗))

==== Suksuhu River / Suksuhu bira (蘇克素護 or 苏克苏护 毕拉) Clan: Aisin Gioro ====
- Wang Gao (王杲) († 1575)
- Atai (阿台) (1575–1583) & 阿海 & 阿弟
- Nikan Wailan (尼堪外兰) († 1586)
- Giocangga (觉昌安) (1542–1571) (Temple name: Jǐngzǔ 景祖)
- Taksi (塔克世) (1571–1583) (Temple name: Xiǎnzǔ 显祖)
- Nurhaci (努尔哈赤) (Temple name: 太祖)

=== List of Haixi Jurchens chieftains ===
Located near the banks of Songhua River

==== Hulun confederation (扈伦) ====
- Kesina 克什纳

==== Yehe or Yehe Nara (葉赫 / 叶赫) Clan ====
Location: banks of Yehe River south of Changchun

- Singgen Darhan 星垦达尔汉/星根達爾漢
- Sirke Minggatu 席尔克明噶图/席爾克明噶圖
- Cirgani 齐尔噶尼/齊爾噶尼
- Cukungge 祝孔格/褚孔格
- Taicu 太杵
- Yangginu (楊吉砮) & Cinggiyanu (淸佳砮) († 1584)
- Narimbulu (纳林布录) (1584–1613) 庚寅
- Jintaiji (金台石) (1613–1619) (己巳)

==== Hata/Hada Clan (哈達 / 哈达) (1543–1601) ====
Location: south of the Yehe Clan (east of Kaiyuan), the southernmost among the Haixi Jurchens.

- Wangji Wailan (旺济外兰(王忠))
- Wang Tai (萬汗/王台) 1548–1582
- Hurhan 扈尔罕 1582
- Menggebulu 孟格布录 1582–1599
- Ulhūda 武尔古岱 1599–1601

==== Ula (烏拉/乌拉) Clan (1405–1616) ====
Location: Hulan River (north of Harbin)

- Buyan 布顔
- Bugan 布干
- Mantai (满泰) (?–1596), the father of Lady Abahai (阿巴亥)
- Bujantai (布占泰) (1596–1618), the younger brother of Mantai

==== Hoifa Clan (輝發 / 辉发) (?–1607) ====
- Wangginu 汪加奴(王机砮)
- Baindari 摆银答里 († 1607)

== See also ==
- List of Manchu clans
- Aisin Gioro
- Jurchens
