= House of Aisin Gioro =

Manchu clan and imperial house of Qing Dynasty

Aisin Gioro ᠠᡳᠰᡳᠨ ᡤᡳᠣᡵᠣ 愛新覺羅
- Imperial House of China
- Parent house: Odoli Clan; Gioro tribe
- Country: Later Jin; Qing dynasty; Manchukuo
- Founded: 1571; 455 years ago
- Founder: Taksi
- Current head: Jin Yuzhang
- Final ruler: Puyi
- Historic seat: Forbidden City, Beijing; Summer Palace, Beijing; Old Summer Palace, Beijing; Mukden Palace, Shenyang; Chengde Mountain Resort, Chengde
- Titles: Chief of the Jianzhou Jurchens; Khan of the Great Jin; Emperor of the Great Qing; Emperor of China; Son of Heaven; Ejen; Kundulun Khan; Bogda Khan; Emperor Manjushri; Chinese khagan; Crown Prince; Duke Who Receives Grace; Emperor of Manchukuo
- Style: "His/Her Imperial Majesty"
- Distinctions: List: Ancestors: Fekulen; Bukūri Yongšon; Fancha; Huihou; Rongshao Bauchi (Rong Shaobaoqi); Fanca (also called Fancha); Yewuju; Mengtemu; Agu; Qin Yang; Cuyan (Chu Yan); Cungšan (also known as Dongshan, Chashan or Chongshan by the Qing people); Toimo; Tolo; Toyuebeo; Sibeoci Fiyanggū; Fuman; Giocangga
- Deposition: February 12, 1912

The House of Aisin Gioro is a Manchu clan that ruled the Later Jin dynasty (1616–1636), the Qing dynasty (1636–1912), and Manchukuo (1932–1945) in the history of China. Under the Ming dynasty, members of the Aisin Gioro clan served as chiefs of the Jianzhou Jurchens, one of the three major Jurchen tribes at this time. Qing bannermen passed through the gates of the Great Wall in 1644, and eventually conquered the short-lived Shun dynasty, Xi dynasty and Southern Ming dynasty. After gaining total control of China proper, the Qing dynasty later expanded into other adjacent regions, including Xinjiang, Tibet, Outer Mongolia, and Taiwan. The dynasty reached its zenith during the High Qing era and under the Qianlong Emperor, who reigned from 1735 to 1796. This reign was followed by a century of gradual decline.

The house lost power in 1912 following the Xinhai Revolution. Puyi, the last Aisin Gioro emperor, nominally maintained his imperial title in the Forbidden City until the Articles of Favourable Treatment were revoked by Feng Yuxiang in 1924. The Qing was China's last orthodox imperial dynasty.

== Etymology ==
House of Aisin Gioro

Chinese name
- Traditional Chinese: 愛新覺羅
- Simplified Chinese: 爱新觉罗
Transcriptions
Standard Mandarin
- Hanyu Pinyin: Àixīnjuéluó

Manchu name
- Manchu script: ᠠᡳᠰᡳᠨ ᡤᡳᠣᡵᠣ

Aisin means 'gold', corresponding to Chinese 金 jīn. Gioro refers to the clan's ancestral home in today Yilan County, Heilongjiang. Following the fall of the Qing empire, most members of the clan have changed their surnames to Sino family names such as Jin, Zhao, Ai, Luo, Bai, Hai or Slavicized in Russia like Aysinev, Zolotov or Zolotaryov.

For example, one of the heads of the Aisin Gioro clan adopted the Chinese name Jin Youzhi.

== Heads of the House ==
The Aisin Gioro House had no system of automatic succession such as primogeniture or a law of succession. Instead, an emperor would name an heir in a secret edict. The edict would be read before senior members of the clan following the emperor's death. An emperor could have numerous sons by women of various ranks. In 1912, the Qing dynasty was overthrown and China was declared a republic. Puyi, the last emperor, was granted the right to maintain his imperial title in the Forbidden City until 1924, when the Articles of Favorable Treatment were revoked. He went to Changchun in northeastern China to serve as chief executive (1932–1934) and later emperor (1934–1945) of Manchukuo, a puppet state of Japan.

Heads of the House of Aisin Gioro
Reign	Given name	Era name	Notes
Chieftains of the Jianzhou Jurchens
1571–1583	Taksi		First head of the house. Ancestor of the clan, son of Giocangga, and father of Nurhaci
1583-1616	Nurhaci		Son of Taksi. Unified the Jianzhou Jurchens in 1588.
Khans of the Later Jin dynasty
1616–1626	Nurhaci	Tianming Emperor	Founder of dynasty
1626–1636	Hong Taiji	Tiancong Emperor	Eighth son of Nurhaci
Emperors of the Qing dynasty
1636–1643	Hong Taiji	Chongde Emperor	Proclaimed the "Great Qing Empire" in 1636
1644–1661	Fulin	Shunzhi Emperor	First to rule in Beijing. Ninth son of Hong Taiji
1661–1722	Xuanye	Kangxi Emperor	Longest reign. Third son of the Shunzhi Emperor.
1723–1735	Yinzhen	Yongzheng Emperor	Fourth son of the Kangxi Emperor
1736–1796	Hongli	Qianlong Emperor	Fourth son of the Yongzheng Emperor
1796–1820	Yongyan	Jiaqing Emperor	Fifteenth son of the Qianlong Emperor
1821–1850	Minning	Daoguang Emperor	Second son of the Jiaqing Emperor
1851–1861	Yizhu	Xianfeng Emperor	Fourth son of the Daoguang Emperor
1862–1875	Zaichun	Tongzhi Emperor	First son of the Xianfeng Emperor
1875–1908	Zaitian	Guangxu Emperor	Second son of Yixuan
1908–1912; 1917	Puyi	Xuantong Emperor	First son of Zaifeng
Heads of the House since 1912
1912–1967	Puyi		Deposed as in 1912. Removed from the Forbidden City in 1924. Emperor of Manchukuo from 1934 to 1945.
1967–1994	Prince Pujie		Brother of Puyi
1994–2015	Jin Youzhi		Prince Puren, half brother of Puyi
2015–present	Jin Yuzhang		Son of Puren

The more recent heads of the house are given according to a succession law approved by Puyi in 1937. This follows the practice of relevant news reports and reference works. The law provided for father-to-son succession. Brothers may succeed in the absence of male issue. As a full brother, Pujie had precedence over half brother Jin Youzhi.

== Family tree ==
- Min-ning, the Daoguang Emperor (1782–1850)
  - Yizhu, the Xianfeng Emperor (1831–1861)
    - Zaichun, the Tongzhi Emperor (1856–1875)
  - Yixuan, Prince Chun (1840–1891)
    - Zaitian, the Guangxu Emperor (1871–1908)
    - Zaifeng, Prince Chun (1883–1951)
      - Puyi, (1906–1967) the Xuantong Emperor of China, emperor of Manchukuo
      - Pujie, head of the House of Aisin Gioro (1907–1994)
      - Puren (Jin Youzhi), head of the House of Aisin Gioro (1918–2015)
        - Jin Yuzhang, head of the House of Aisin Gioro (born 1942)
        - (1) Jin Yuquan (金毓峑, born 1946)
        - (2) Jin Yulan (金毓岚, born 1948)
    - Zaixun, Prince Rui (1885–1949)
      - Pugong (1904–1969)
        - (3) Huang Shixiang (b. 1941)
    - Zaitao (1887–1970)
      - Pujia (溥佳, 1908–1979)
        - Jin Yuyin (金毓崟 1928–2022)
      - Pu'an (溥侒, 1911–1944)
        - (4) Jin Yucheng (金毓㞼, born 1944)
      - Pushen (溥伸, 1915–1928)
      - Puxi (溥僖) (1924–1983)
      - (5) Pushi (溥仕) (born 1940)
  - Yicong, Prince Dun (23 July 1831 – 18 February 1889)
    - Zailian (載濂; 1854–1917)
      - Pucheng (1873-1932)
        - Yuyan (17 May 1918 – 18 January 1999)
          - Hengzhen (恒镇, Héngzhèn; 1944-27 August 2023)
            - (6) Hengxing (恆星, Héngxīng) (born in 1977)
          - (7) Hengkai (恆鎧; b. 1945)
            - (8) Jin Qiqi (金啟琪; b. 1980)
          - (9) Hengjun (恆鈞; b. 1966)
            - (10) Jin Qitong (b. 1996)

== Origins ==
The Aisin Gioro traced its ancestry to Bukūri Yongšon, a legendary warrior of the thirteenth century. Emperor Hongtaiji claimed that Bukūri Yongšon was conceived from a virgin birth. According to the legend, three heavenly maidens, Enggulen, Jenggulen, and Fekulen, were bathing at a lake called Bulhūri Omo near the Changbai Mountains. A magpie dropped a piece of red fruit near Fekulen, who ate it. She then became pregnant with Bukūri Yongšon. However, this legend belongs to another Manchu clan, the Hurha (Hurka). The real ancestor of the Aisin Gioro clan was Möngke Temür, a chieftain of the Odoli tribe in the Mongolian Yuan Empire.

Nurgaci created the Aisin Gioro clan as part of a reorganization of Jurchen society he initiated in 1601. His supporters were enrolled into the banner system and the population militarized. The Gioro clan was partitioned. Those descended from Taksi, Nurgaci's father, were designated Aisin (gold), while other Gioros adopted different clan names, such as Irgen Gioro, Šušu Gioro, Sirin Gioro, Tunggiyan Gioro, Ayan Gioro, Hūlun Gioro, Aha Gioro, and Cara Gioro.

When the Jurchens were reorganized by Nurhaci into the Eight Banners, many clans were created as a group of unrelated people (mukun) using a geographic origin name such as a toponym for their hala (clan name).

The Manchu have an equally artificial origin. Although the people ruled by Aisin Gioro were ethnically mixed, the entire population was designated as "Manchu" in 1635.

=== Expansion under Nurhaci and Hong Taiji ===
Qing Empire in 1636

Under Nurhaci and his son Hong Taiji, the Aisin Gioro clan of the Jianzhou tribe won hegemony among the rival Jurchen tribes of the northeast, then through warfare and alliances extended its control into Inner Mongolia. Nurhachi created large, permanent civil-military units called "banners" to replace the small hunting groups used in his early campaigns. A banner was composed of smaller companies; it included some 7,500 warriors and their households, including slaves, under the command of a chieftain. Each banner was identified by a coloured flag that was yellow, white, blue, or red, either plain or with a border design. Originally there were four, then eight, Manchu banners; new banners were created as the Manchu conquered new regions, and eventually there were Manchu, Mongol, and Chinese banners, eight for each ethnic group. By 1648, less than one-sixth of the bannermen were actually of Manchu ancestry. The Qing conquest of the Ming dynasty was thus achieved with a multiethnic army led by Manchu nobles and Han Chinese generals. Han Chinese soldiers were organised into the Army of the Green Standard, which became a sort of imperial constabulary force posted throughout China and on the frontiers.

The change of the name from Jurchen to Manchu was made to hide the fact that the ancestors of the Manchus, the Jianzhou Jurchens, were ruled by the Chinese. The Qing dynasty carefully hid the 2 original editions of the books of "Qing Taizu Wu Huangdi Shilu" and the "Manzhou Shilu Tu" (Taizu Shilu Tu) in the Qing palace, forbidden from public view because they showed that the Manchu Aisin Gioro family had been ruled by the Ming dynasty. In the Ming period, the Koreans of Joseon referred to the Jurchen inhabited lands north of the Korean peninsula, above the rivers Yalu and Tumen to be part of Ming China, as the "superior country" which they called Ming China. The Qing deliberately excluded references and information that showed the Jurchens (Manchus) as subservient to the Ming dynasty, from the History of Ming to hide their former subservient relationship to the Ming. The Veritable Records of the Ming were not used to source content on Jurchens during Ming rule in the History of Ming because of this. This historical revisionism helped remove the accusation of rebellion from the Qing ruling family refusing to mention in the Mingshi the fact that the Qing founders were Ming China's subjects. The Qing Yongzheng Emperor attempted to rewrite the historical record and claim that the Aisin Gioro were never subjects of past dynasties and empires trying to cast Nurhaci's acceptance of Ming titles like Dragon Tiger General (longhu jiangjun 龍虎將軍) by claiming he accepted to "please Heaven".

== Intermarriage and political alliances ==
The Qing emperors arranged marriages between Aisin Gioro noblewomen and outsiders to create political marriage alliances. During the Manchu conquest of the Ming Empire, the Manchu rulers offered to marry their princesses to Han Chinese military officers who served the Ming Empire as a means of inducing these officers into surrendering or defecting to their side. Aisin Gioro princesses were also married to Mongol princes, for the purpose of forming alliances between the Manchus and Mongol tribes.

The Manchus successfully induced one Han Chinese general, Li Yongfang (李永芳), into defecting to their side by offering him a position in the Manchu banners. Li Yongfang also married the daughter of Abatai, a son of the Qing dynasty's founder Nurhaci. Many more Han Chinese abandoned their posts in the Ming Empire and defected to the Manchu side. There were over 1,000 marriages between Han Chinese men and Manchu women in 1632 – due to a proposal by Yoto (岳托), a nephew of the Manchu emperor Hong Taiji. Hong Taiji believed that intermarriage between Han Chinese and Manchus could help to eliminate ethnic conflicts in areas already occupied by the Manchus, as well as help the Han Chinese forget their ancestral roots more easily.

Manchu noblewomen were also married to Han Chinese men who surrendered or defected to the Manchu side. Aisin Gioro women were married to the sons of the Han Chinese generals Sun Sike (孫思克), Geng Jimao, Shang Kexi and Wu Sangui. The e'fu (額駙) rank was given to husbands of Manchu princesses. Geng Zhongming, a Han bannerman, was awarded the title "Prince Jingnan", while his grandsons Geng Jingzhong, Geng Zhaozhong (耿昭忠) and Geng Juzhong (耿聚忠) married Hooge's daughter, Abatai's granddaughter, and Yolo's daughter respectively. Sun Sike's son, Sun Cheng'en (孫承恩), married the Kangxi Emperor's fourth daughter, Heshuo Princess Quejing (和硕悫靖公主).

Imperial Duke Who Assists the State (宗室輔國公) Aisin Gioro Suyan's (蘇燕) daughter was married to Han Chinese Banner General Nian Gengyao.

== Genetics ==
Haplogroup C3b2b1*-M401(xF5483) has been identified as a possible marker of the Aisin Gioro and is found in ten different ethnic minorities in northern China, but largely absent from Han Chinese.

Genetic testing also showed that the haplogroup C3b1a3a2-F8951 of the Aisin Gioro family came to southeastern Manchuria after migrating from their place of origin in the Amur river's middle reaches, originating from ancestors related to Daurs in the Transbaikal area. The Tungusic speaking peoples mostly have C3c-M48 as their subclade of C3 which drastically differs from the C3b1a3a2-F8951 haplogroup of the Aisin Gioro which originates from Mongolic speaking populations like the Daur. Jurchen (Manchus) are a Tungusic people. The Mongol Genghis Khan's haplogroup C3b1a3a1-F3796 (C3*-Star Cluster) is a fraternal "brother" branch of C3b1a3a2-F8951 haplogroup of the Aisin Gioro.

A genetic test was conducted on seven men who claimed Aisin Gioro descent with three of them showing documented genealogical information of all their ancestors up to Nurhaci. Three of them turned out to share the C3b2b1*-M401(xF5483) haplogroup, out of them, two of them were the ones who provided their documented family trees. The other four tested were unrelated. The Daur Ao clan carries the unique haplogroup subclade C2b1a3a2-F8951, the same haplogroup as Aisin Gioro and both Ao and Aisin Gioro only diverged merely a couple of centuries ago from a shared common ancestor. Other members of the Ao clan carry haplogroups like N1c-M178, C2a1b-F845, C2b1a3a1-F3796 and C2b1a2-M48. People from northeast China, the Daur Ao clan and Aisin Gioro clan are the main carriers of haplogroup C2b1a3a2-F8951. The Mongolic C2*-Star Cluster (C2b1a3a1-F3796) haplogroup is a fraternal branch to Aisin Gioro's C2b1a3a2-F8951 haplogroup.

== Current population ==
There were 29,000 members of Aisin Gioro in 1912 when the Qing dynasty fell, in sharp contrast to the Ming dynasty before it, whose ruling House of Zhu had 200,000 (0.2 million) members by the time of its fall. The Manchu emperors had smaller reproduction and harems than the Ming on average and taxed Chinese peasants less than the Ming did to maintain the harem. The Ming Wanli emperor's harem's daily expenditure was more than the Qing Yongzheng emperor's harem annual expenditure. There were 6 generations of Aisin Gioro before Emperor Shunzhi's reign since Nurhaci's grandfather founded the Aisin Gioro clan. Going by the lowest estimate of tribal chief's fertility, five sons per man, Aisin Gioro's number ought to have been 3,000 or 3,125 at the start of the Qing. This meant during that China's population growth in general exactly matched the entire Qing dynasty the Aisin Gioro clan's rate of growth for male members carrying the same surname from the start of the Qing to the end of the Qing, which was growth by a factor of 10 from the initial number at the beginning of the Qing dynasty. And it was only two time's China's general population's growth rate when it included non-male line descendants of the Qing imperial family via Aisin Gioro females who did not pass the family name to their descendants. The Ming imperial Zhu family had more than 80,000 people by 1604, 62,000 in 1594, 28,492 in 1569, 28,840 in 1562, 19,611 in 1553, 2,495 in 1506–1521, 127 in 1403–1424 and 58 in 1368–1398. The Empresses of the Qing were very infertile and most often when an emperor died, there was no son of the empress alive. The Xianfeng Emperor had only one son surviving, the Tongzhi emperor. The Guangxu emperor and Tongzhi emperor both had no children. In 1660 the core branch of Aisin Gioro had 378 people while in 1915 it had 29,292 people.

Approximately 300,000 to 400,000 ethnic Manchus in China are surnamed Aisin Gioro (愛新覺羅), while an additional 3.8 million people are surnamed Jin (金), the most common Sinicized form, which has been embraced by core imperial family members like Jin Yuzhang. This gives an upper limit of 4.2 million people who could potentially be patrilineal descendants of Nurhaci, but this figure must be used with caution as there are non-Manchu ethnic groups (notably Koreans) who also use the surname Jin (Kim) for unrelated reasons.

== Notable members ==
=== Iron-cap princes and their descendants ===
According to Qing dynasty imperial tradition, the sons of princes do not automatically inherit their fathers' titles in the same rank as their fathers. For example, Yongqi held the title "Prince Rong of the First Rank", but when his title was passed on to his son, Mianyi, it became "Prince Rong of the Second Rank". In other words, the title gets diminished by one rank as it is passed down to each subsequent generation, but generally to no lower than the rank of kesi-be tuwakiyara gurun-de aisilara gung (second class imperial duke). However, there were 12 princes who were awarded the shi xi wang ti (perpetual heritability, a.k.a. "iron-cap") privilege, which meant that their titles can be passed on to subsequent generations without the downgrading effect.

The 12 "iron-cap" princely peerages are listed as follows. Some of them were renamed at different points in time, hence they had multiple names.

- Prince Zheng / Prince Jian, the line of Jirgalang (1599–1655), descendant of Taksi
- Prince Li / Prince Xun / Prince Kang, the line of Daišan (1583–1648), descendant of Nurhaci
  - Prince Keqin / Prince Cheng / Prince Ping / Prince Yanxi, the line of Yoto (1599–1639), descendant of Nurhaci
    - Prince Shuncheng, the line of Lekdehun (1619–1652), descendant of Nurhaci
- Prince Rui, the line of Dorgon (1612–1650), descendant of Nurhaci
- Prince Yu, the line of Dodo (1614–1649), descendant of Nurhaci
- Prince Su / Prince Xian, the line of Hooge (1609–1648), descendant of Hong Taiji
- Prince Chengze / Prince Zhuang, the line of Šose (1629–1655), descendant of Hong Taiji
- Prince Yi, the line of Yinxiang (1686–1730), descendant of Kangxi Emperor
- Prince Qing, the line of Yikuang (1838–1917), descendant of Qianlong Emperor
- Prince Gong, the line of Yixin (1833–1898), descendant of Daoguang Emperor
- Prince Chun, the line of Yixuan (1840–1891), descendant of Daoguang Emperor

=== Prominent political figures ===
- Daišan (1583–1648), Nurhaci's second son, participated in the Qing conquest of the Ming
- Jirgalang (1599–1655), Nurhaci's nephew, co-regent with Dorgon during the Shunzhi Emperor's early reign
- Ajige (1605–1651), Nurhaci's 12th son, participated in the Qing conquest of the Ming
- Dorgon (1612–1650), Nurhaci's 14th son, Prince-Regent and de facto ruler during the Shunzhi Emperor's early reign
- Dodo (1614–1649), Nurhaci's 15th son, participated in the Qing conquest of the Ming
- Yinsi (1681–1726), the Kangxi Emperor's eighth son, Yinzhen's competitor for the succession, expelled from the Aisin Gioro clan later
- Yinxiang (1686–1730), the Kangxi Emperor's 13th son, Yinzhen's ally
- Yinti (1688–1756), the Kangxi Emperor's 14th son, Yinzhen's competitor for the succession, purported rightful heir to the throne
- Duanhua (1807–1861), descendant of Jirgalang, regent for the Tongzhi Emperor, ousted from power in the Xinyou Coup in 1861
- Sushun (1816–1861), Duanhua's brother, regent for the Tongzhi Emperor, ousted from power in the Xinyou Coup in 1861
- Zaiyuan (1816–1861), descendant of Yinxiang, regent for the Tongzhi Emperor, ousted from power in the Xinyou Coup in 1861
- Yixin (1833–1898), the Daoguang Emperor's sixth son, Prince-Regent during the Tongzhi Emperor's reign
- Yikuang (1838–1917), descendant of Yonglin, Prime Minister of the Imperial Cabinet
- Yixuan (1840–1891), the Daoguang Emperor's seventh son, the Guangxu Emperor's biological father
- Zaiyi (1856–1922), Yicong's son, Boxer Rebellion leader
- Zaize (1876–1929), a sixth-generation descendant of the Kangxi Emperor, Finance Minister and Salt Policy Minister in the Imperial Cabinet
- Zaizhen (1876–1947), Yikuang's son, court minister
- Zaifeng (1883–1951), Yixuan's son, Puyi's biological father, Prince-Regent during Puyi's reign
- Zaixun (1885–1949), Yixuan's sixth son, Navy Minister in the Imperial Cabinet

=== 20th century – present ===
- Pujin (溥伒; 1893–1966), better known as Pu Xuezhai (溥雪齋), guqin player and Chinese painting artist, grandson of Yicong (Prince Dun)
- Puru (1896–1963), Taiwanese artist and calligrapher, grandson of Yixin (Prince Gong)
- Jin Guangping (1899–1966), born Aisin Gioro Hengxu, scholar of the Jurchen and Khitan languages
- Yoshiko Kawashima (1907–1948), born Aisin Gioro Xianyu, a spy for the Japanese Empire during the Sino-Japanese War
- Pujie (1907–1994), Puyi's brother, member of the Chinese People's Political Consultative Conference, nominal head of the Aisin Gioro clan from 1967 to 1994
- Qigong (1912–2005), artist and calligrapher, descended from the Prince He peerage
- Yuyan (1918–1997), calligrapher, distant nephew of Puyi
- Jin Qicong (1918–2004), Jin Guangping's son, historian and scholar of the Jurchen and Manchu languages
- Jin Moyu (1918–2014), born Aisin Gioro Xianqi, Yoshiko Kawashima's younger sister, educator
- Jin Youzhi (1918–2015), born Aisin Gioro Puren, Puyi's half-brother, nominal head of the Aisin Gioro clan from 1994 to 2015
- Aisin Gioro Yuhuan (1929–2003), sanxian player and Chinese painting artist
- Huisheng (1938–1959), first daughter of Pujie, died of suicide.
- Husheng (b. 1940), second daughter of Pujie
- Jin Yuzhang (born 1942), Jin Youzhi's son, governor of Beijing's Chongwen District, nominal head of the Aisin Gioro clan since 2015
- King Pu-tsung (born 1956), Taiwanese politician, allegedly descended from the Aisin Gioro clan
- Aisin Gioro Ulhicun (born 1958), Jin Qicong's daughter, historian and scholar of the Jurchen, Khitan and Manchu languages
- Cecilia Aisin Gioro, Paternal Granddaughter of the last Prince Gong in Qing Dynasty of China and Artist.
- Jin Xin (born, 1976), Daughter of Jin Yuzhang, the nominal head of the Aisin Gioro clan since 2015.
- Zhao Junzhe (born 1979), football player, descended from Boolungga, the fifth brother of Nurhaci's grandfather Giocangga
- Ariel Aisin Gioro (born 1983), actress

== Gallery ==
Images

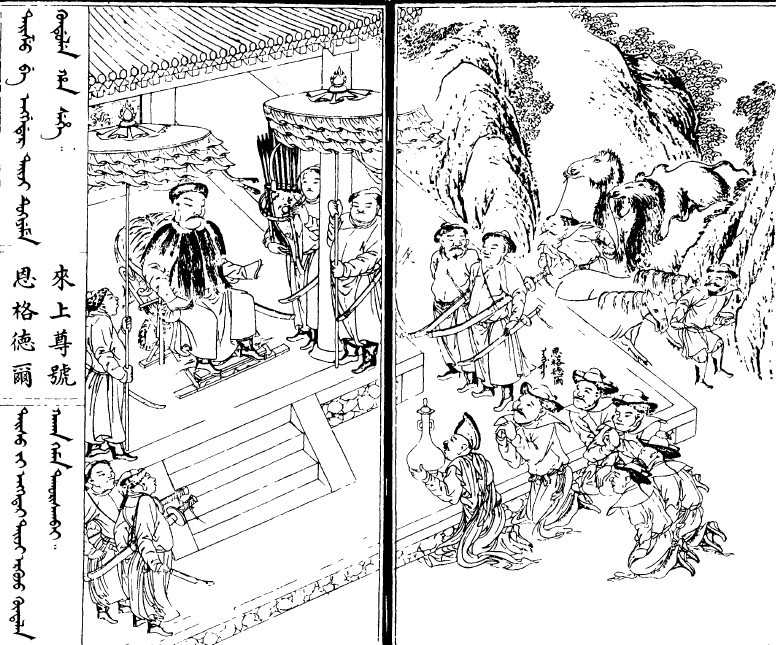
Nurhaci on his throne

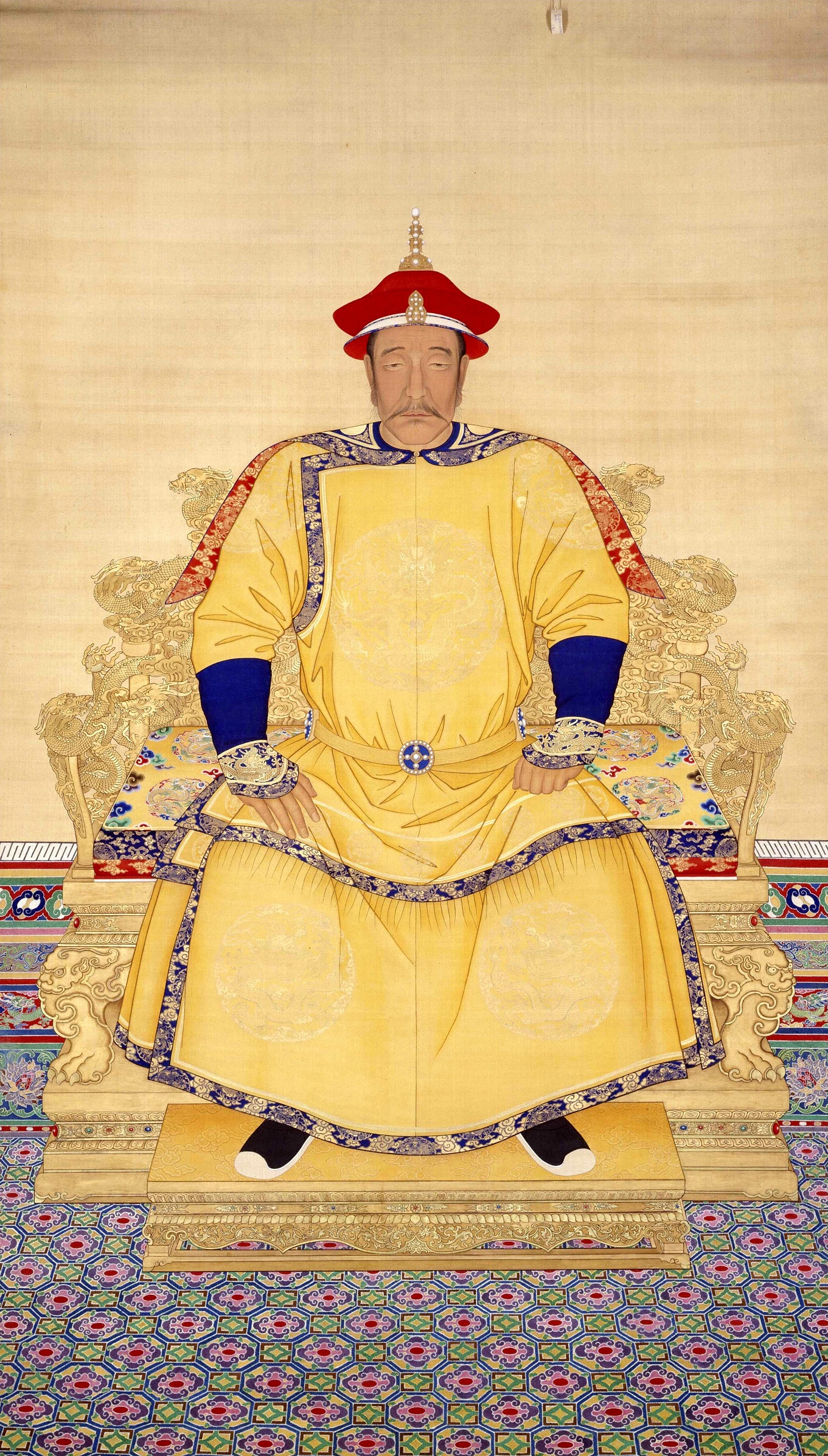
Nurhaci

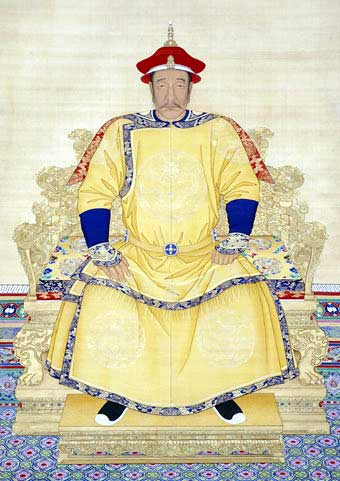
Nurhaci

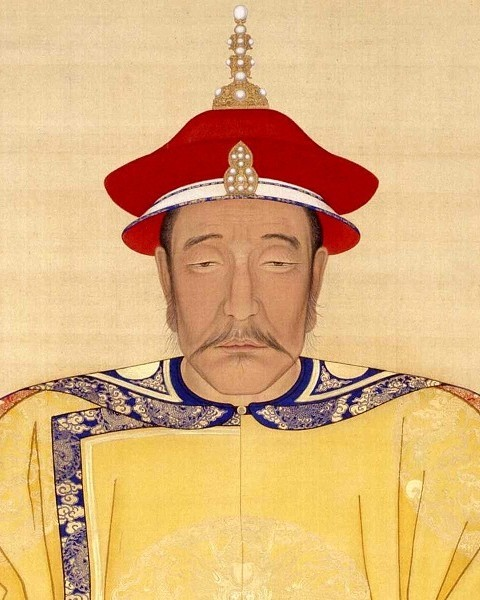
Nurhaci

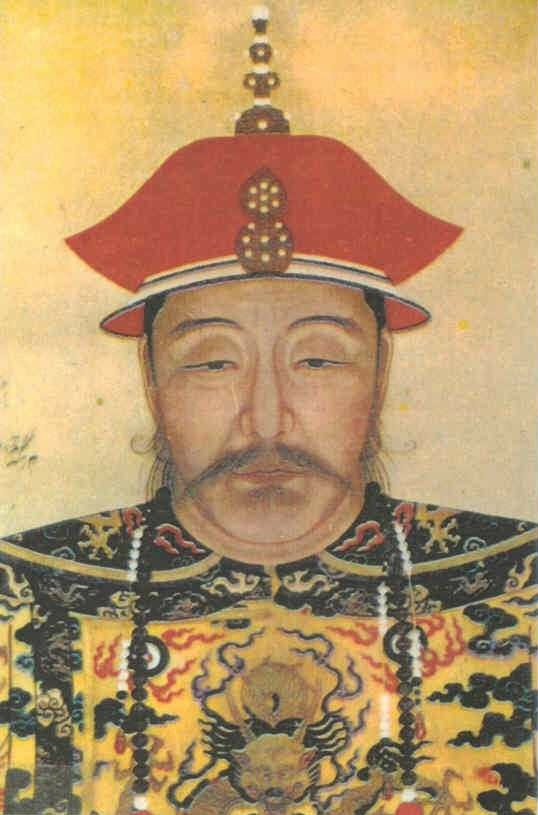
Nurhaci

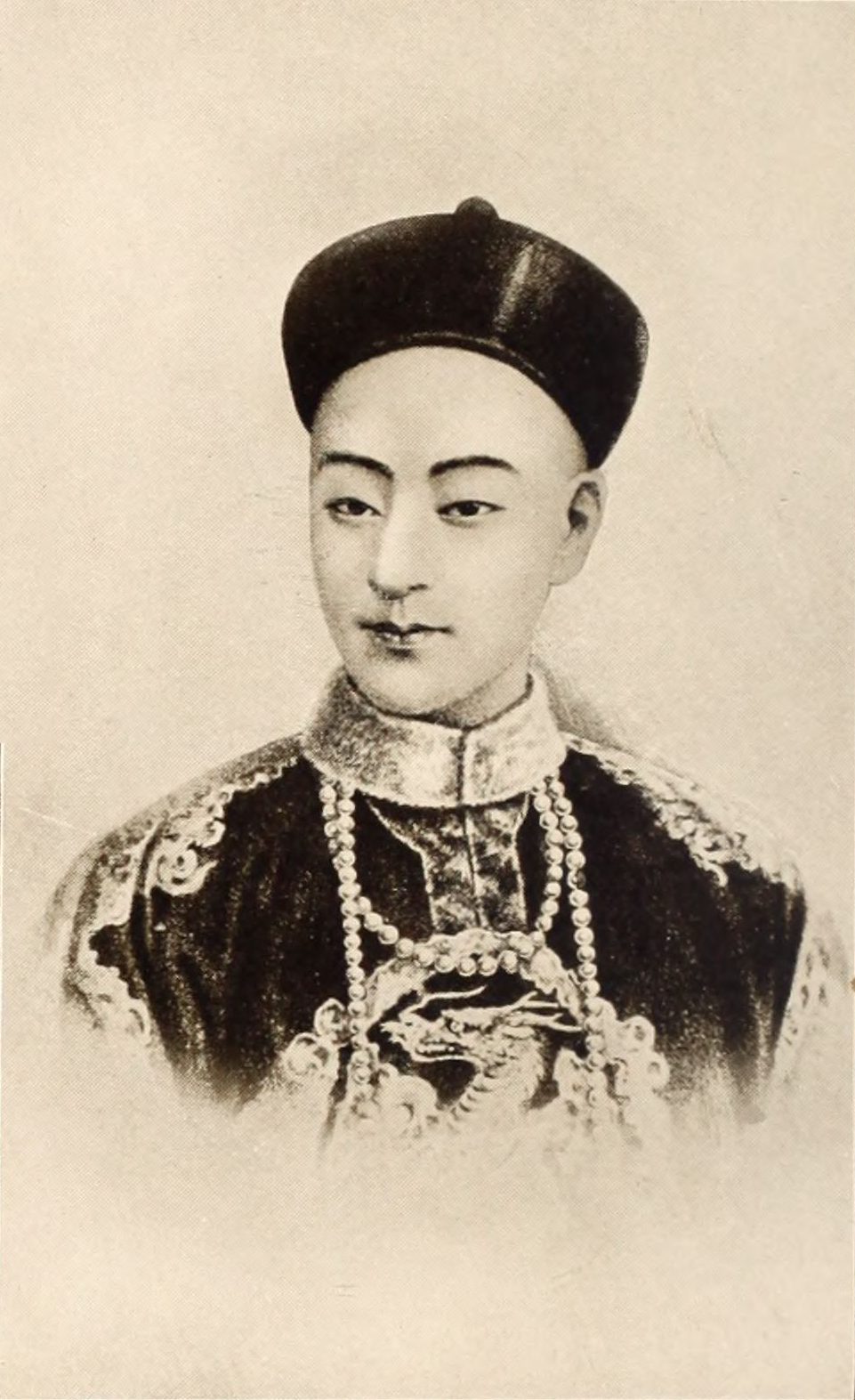
Guangxu Emperor

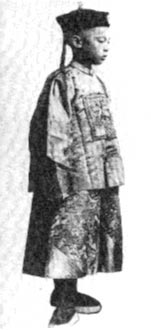
Prince Puyi

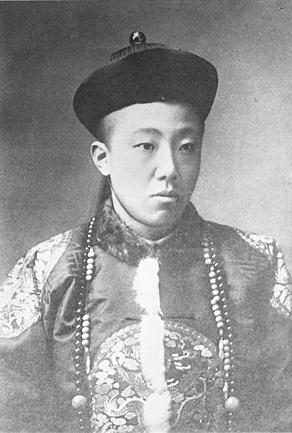
Zaitao

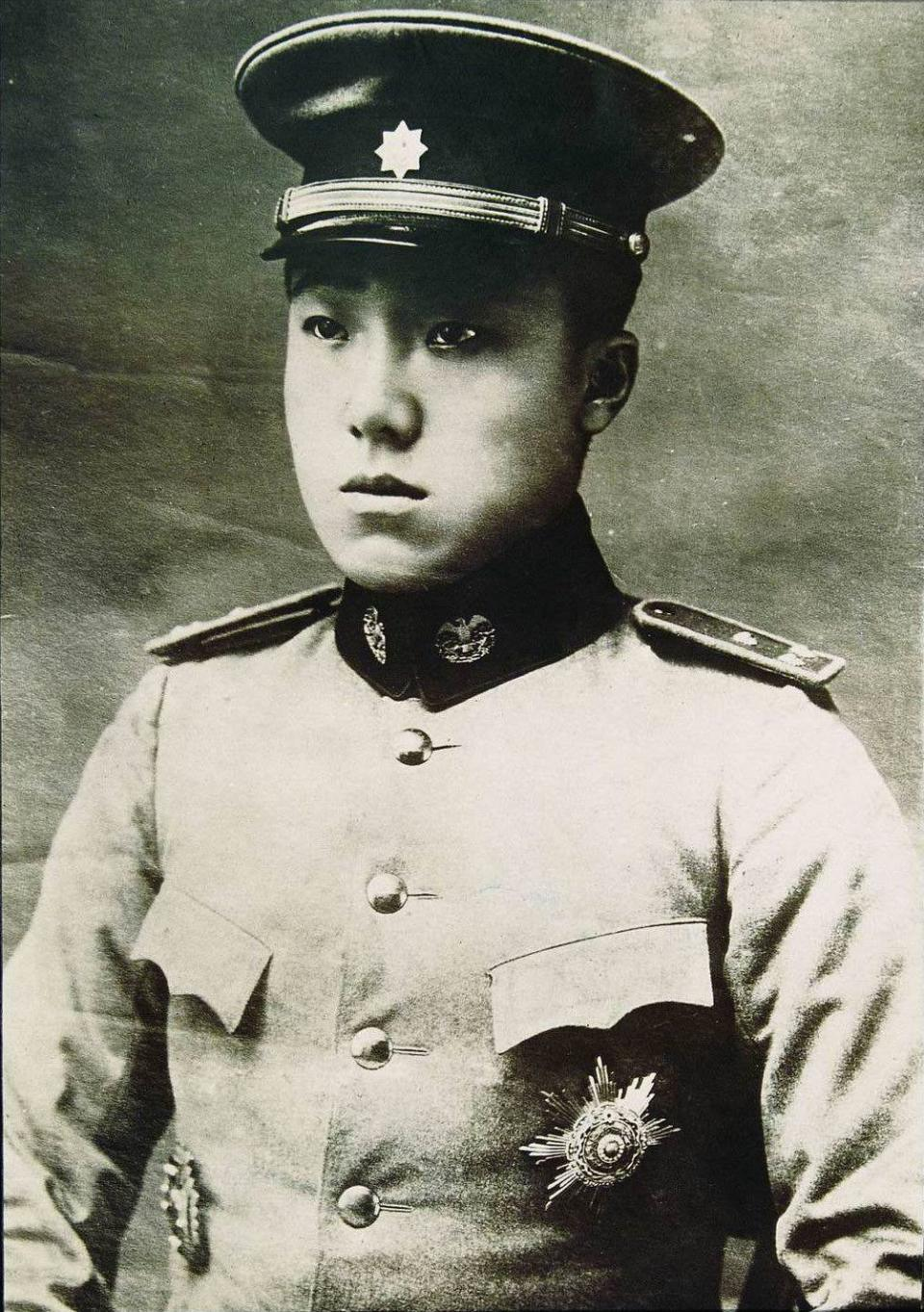
Zaitao

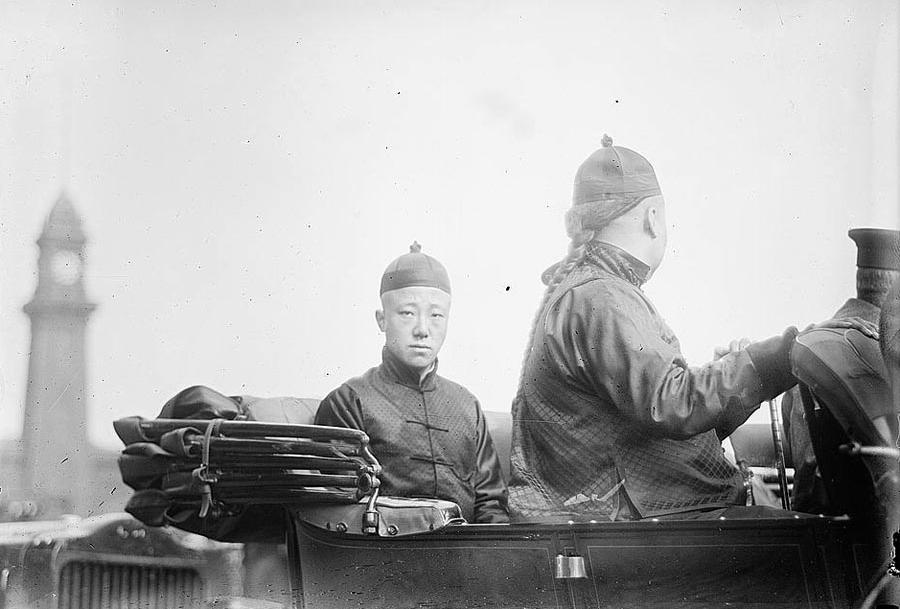
Zaitao in the United States

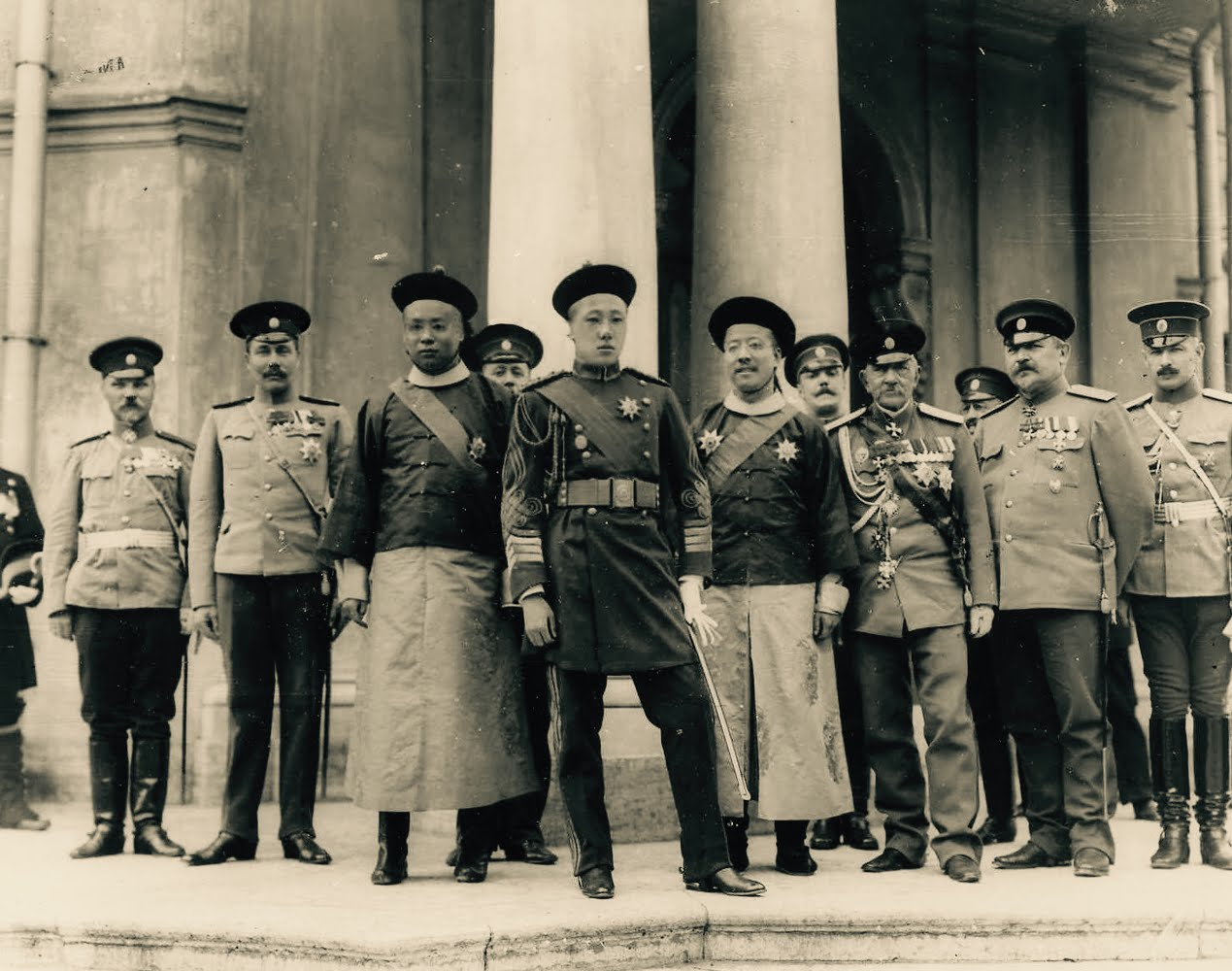
Zaitao in Russia

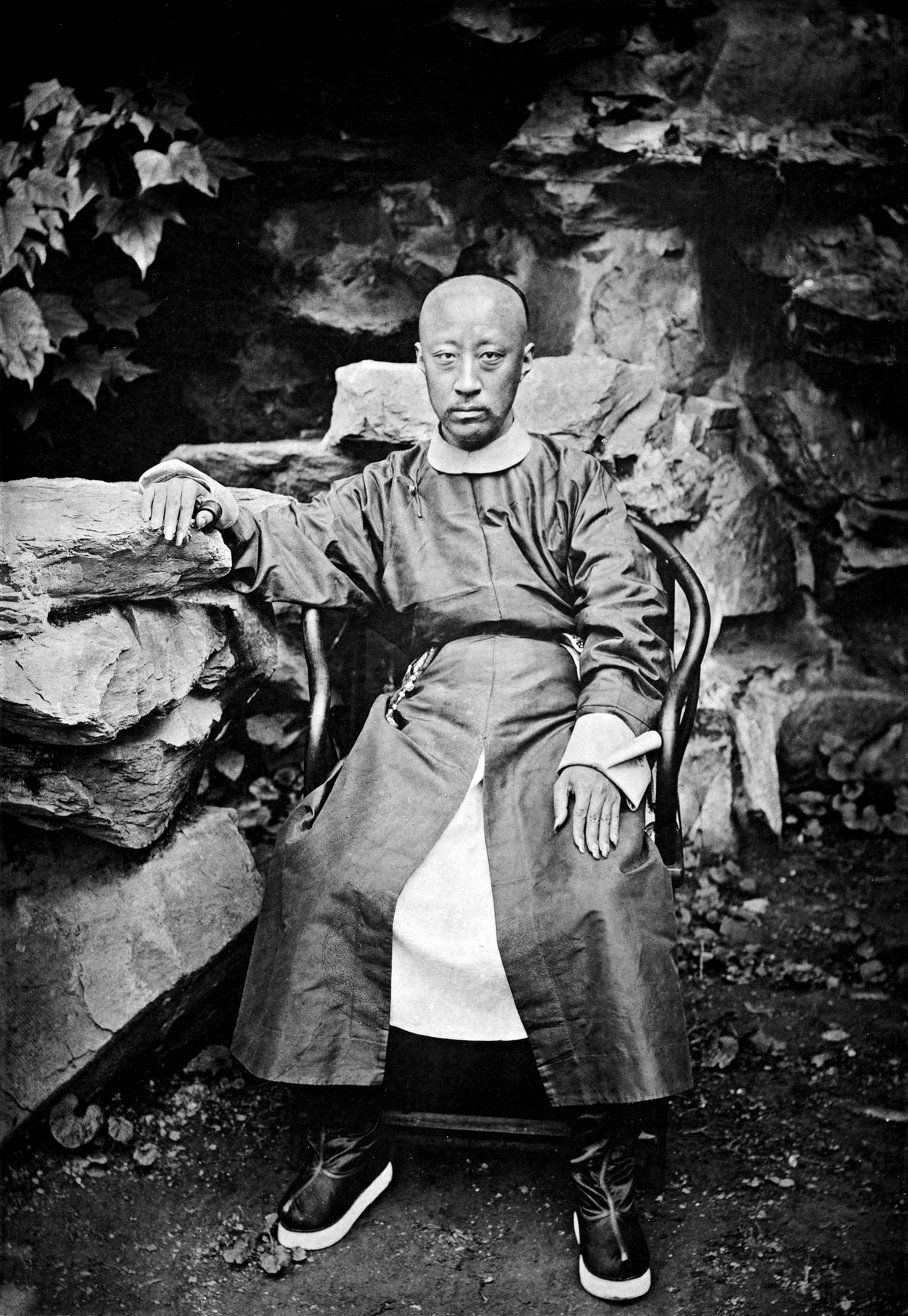
Yixin (Prince Gong)

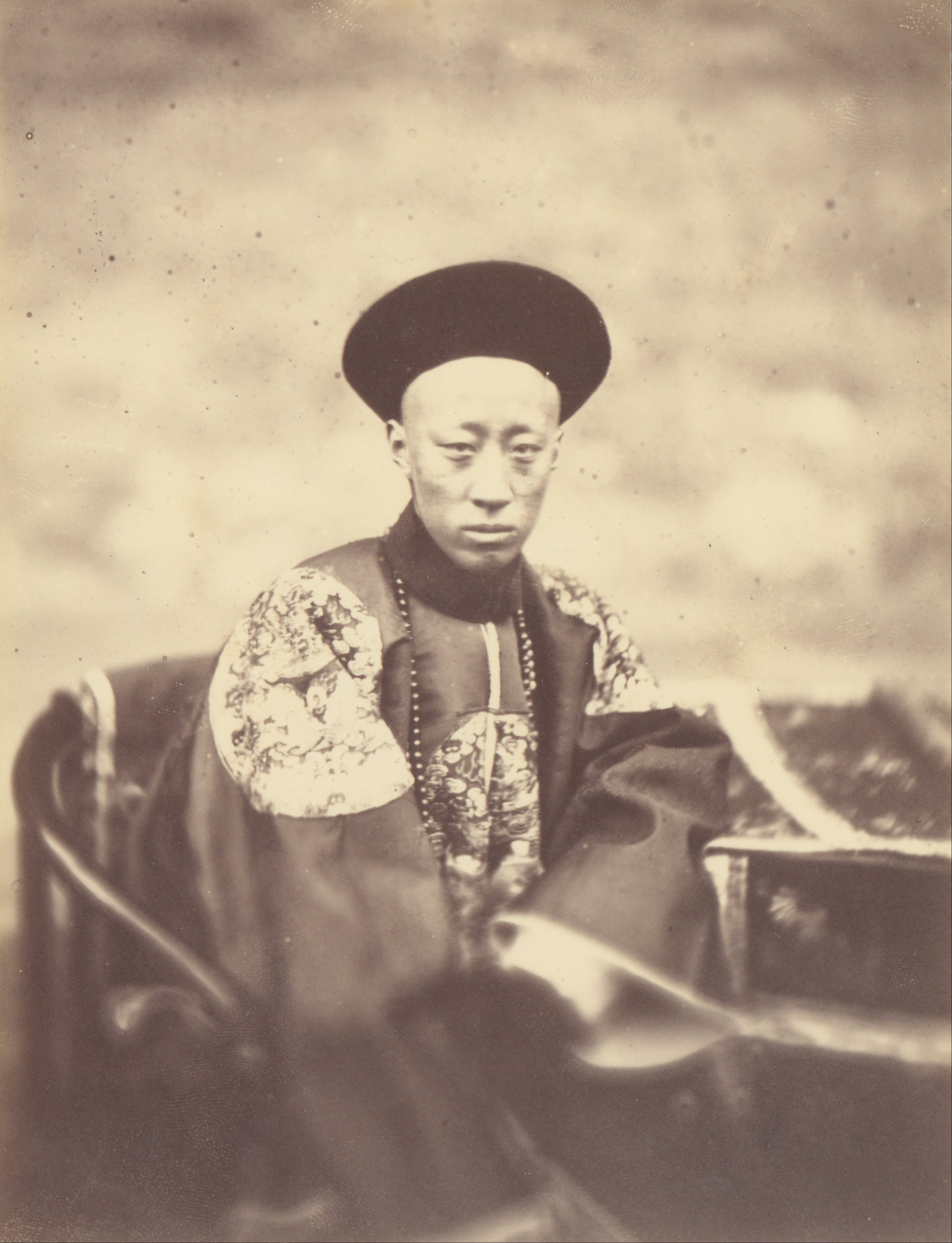
Yixin (Prince Gong)

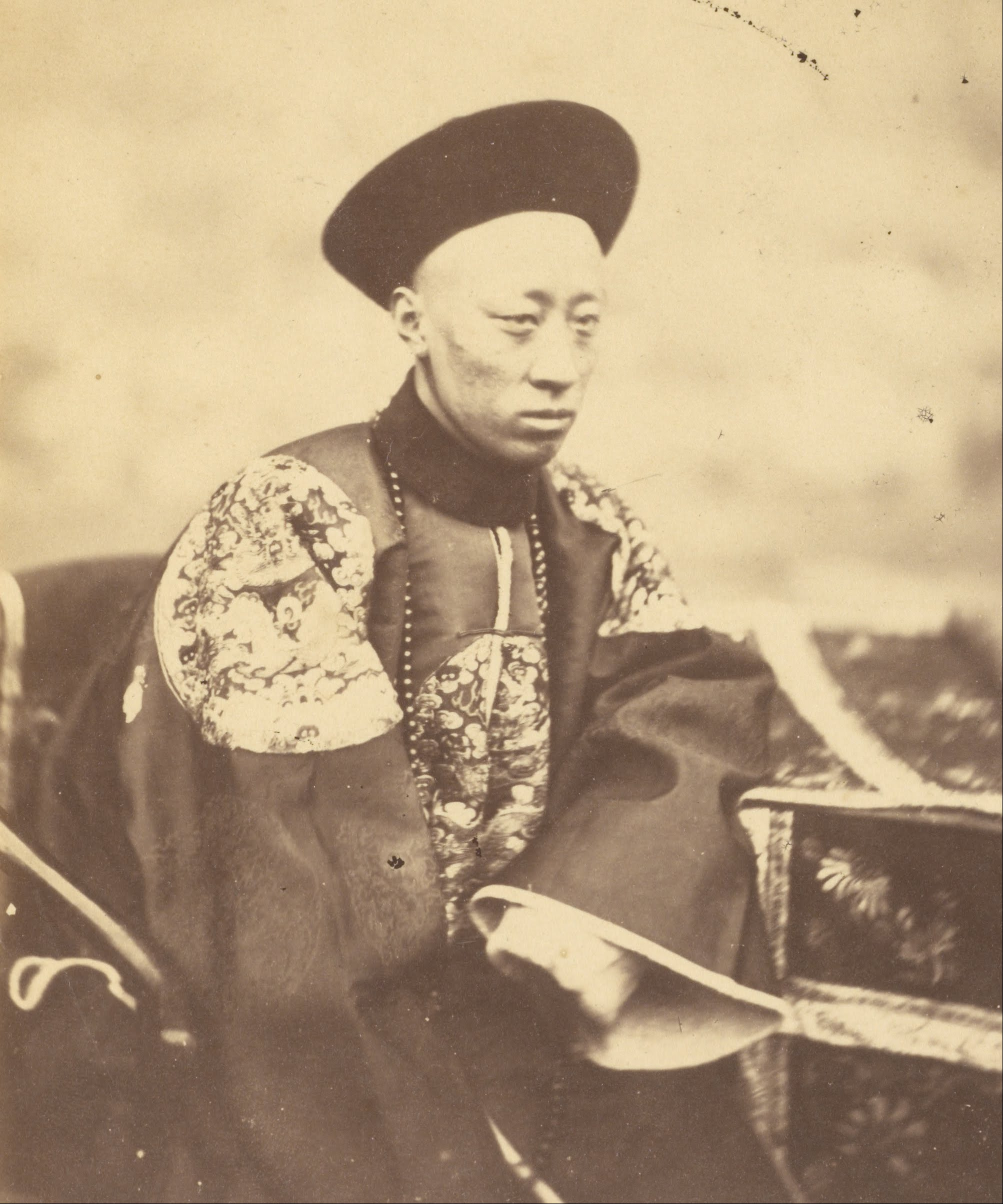
Yixin (Prince Gong)

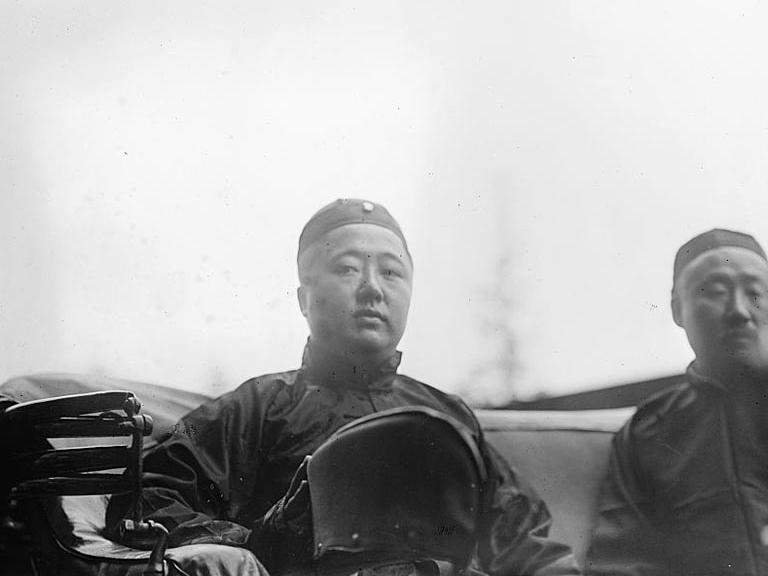
Zaixun (Prince Rui) in the United States

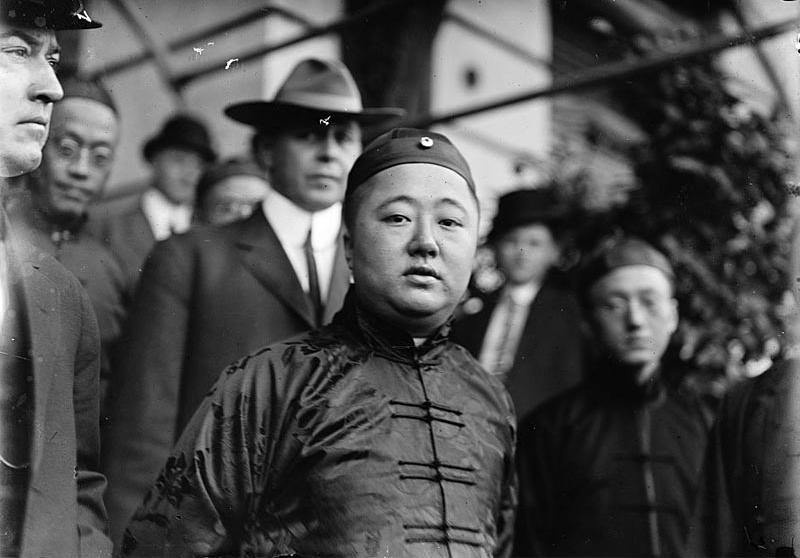
Zaixun (Prince Rui) in the United States

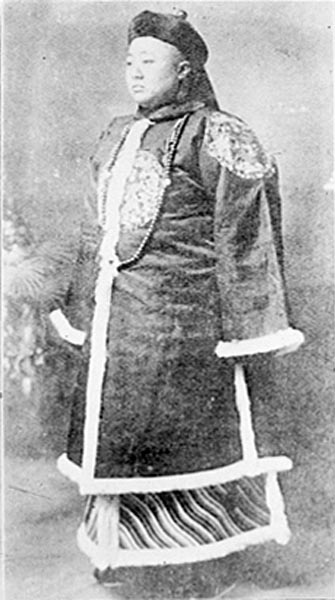
Zaixun (Prince Rui)

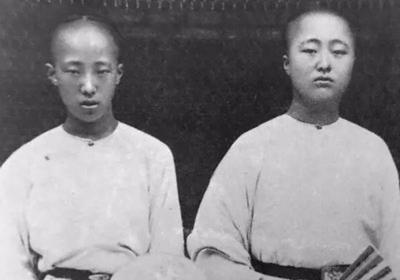
Zaitao and Zaixun (Prince Rui)

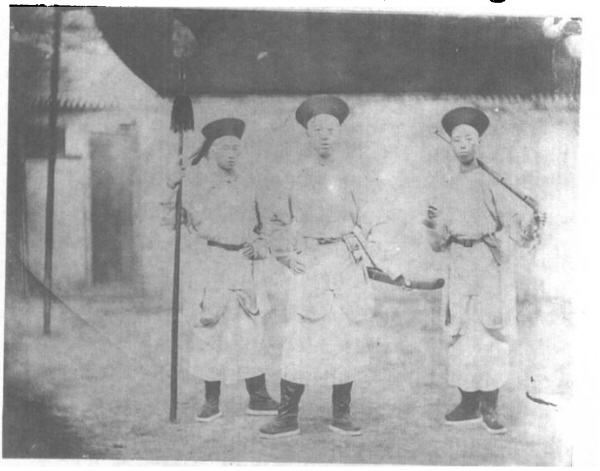
Yixuan (Prince Chun)

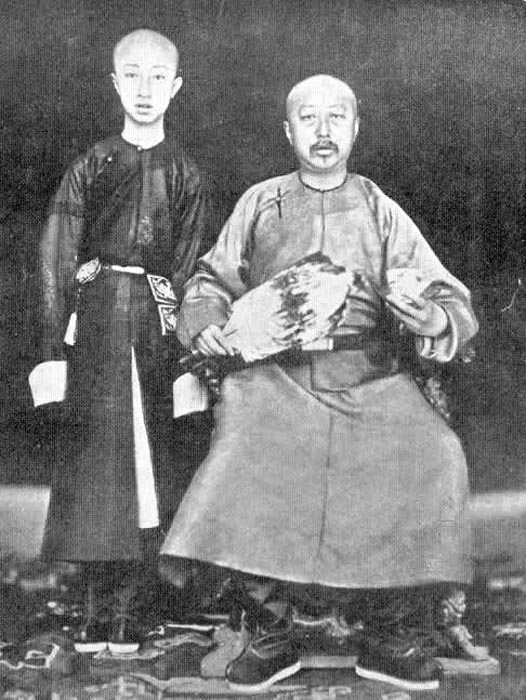
Yixuan (Prince Chun)

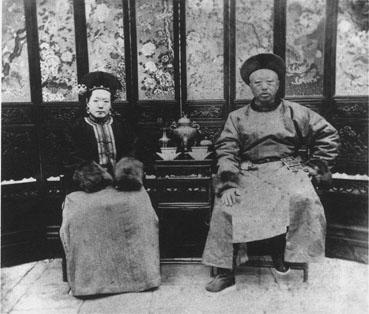
Yixuan (Prince Chun) and his wife

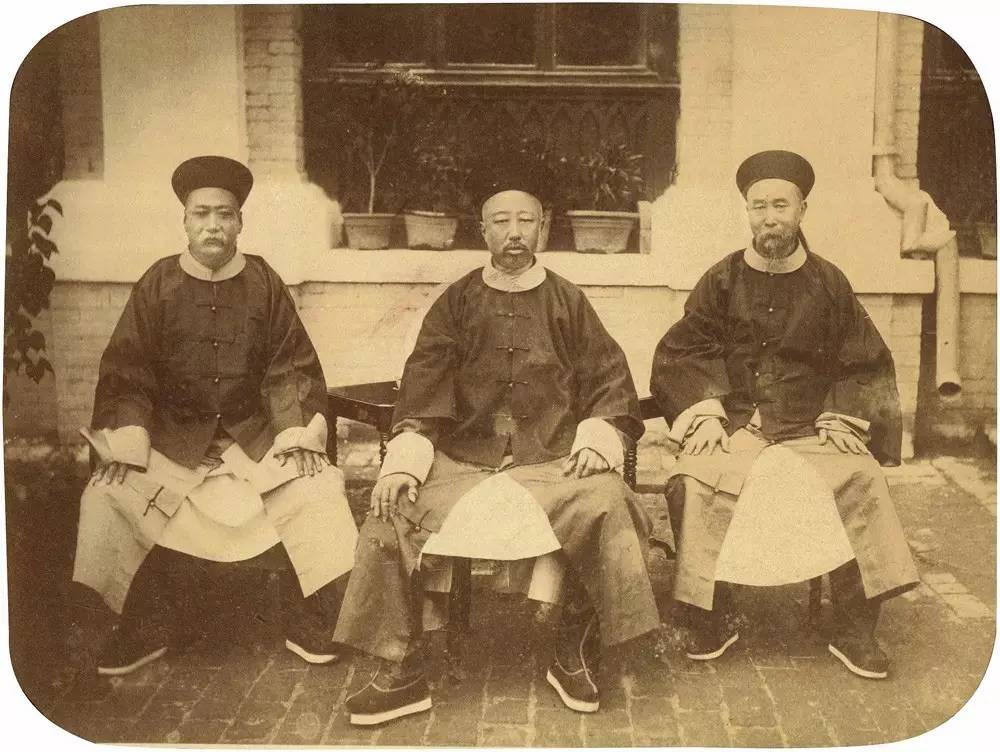
Yixuan (Prince Chun) with Li Hongzhang and Shanqing

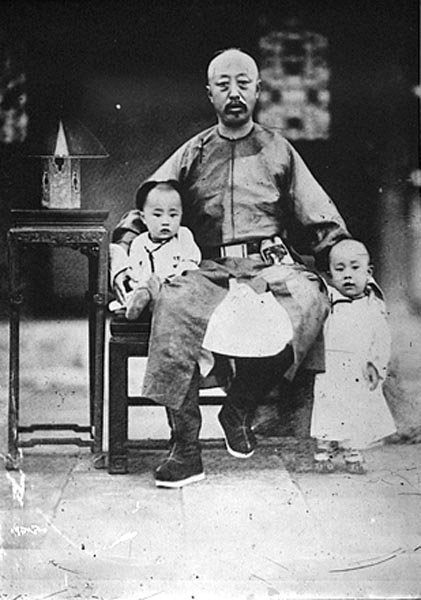
Yixuan (Prince Chun) with his sons Zaixun and Zaifeng

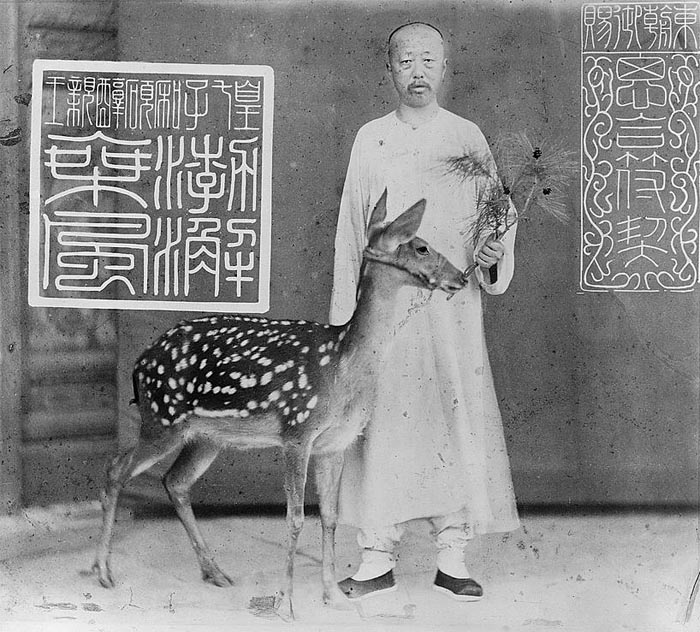
Yixuan (Prince Chun)

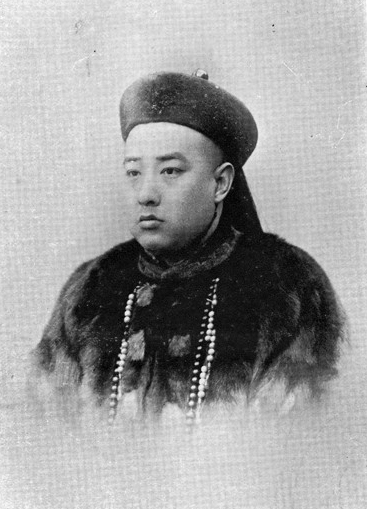
Zaizhen (Prince Qing)

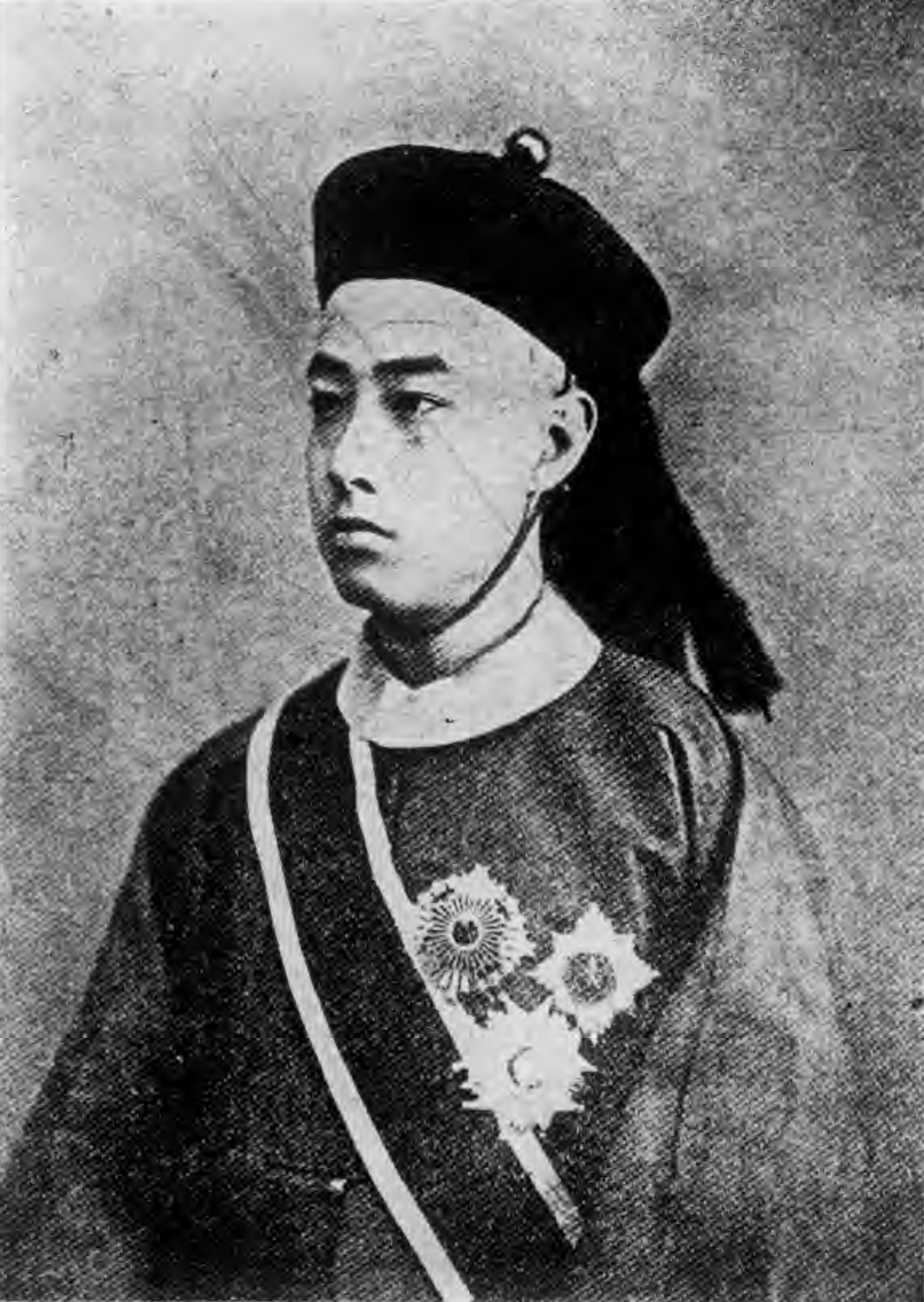
Zaizhen (Prince Qing)

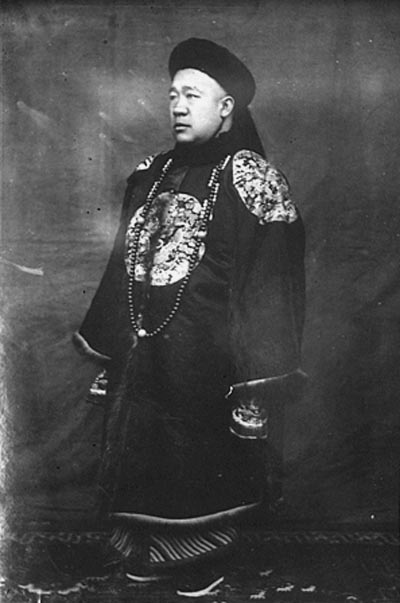
Shanqi (Prince Su)

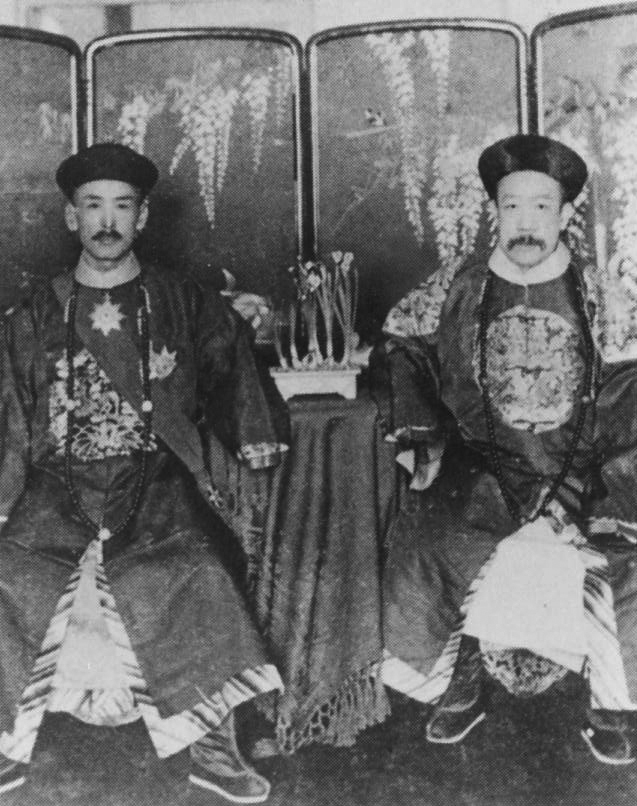
Shanqi (Prince Su)

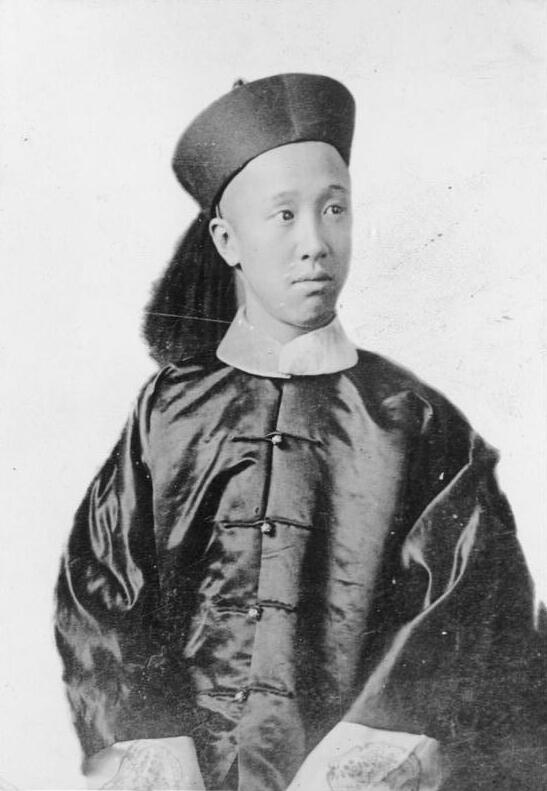
Zaifeng (Prince Chun)

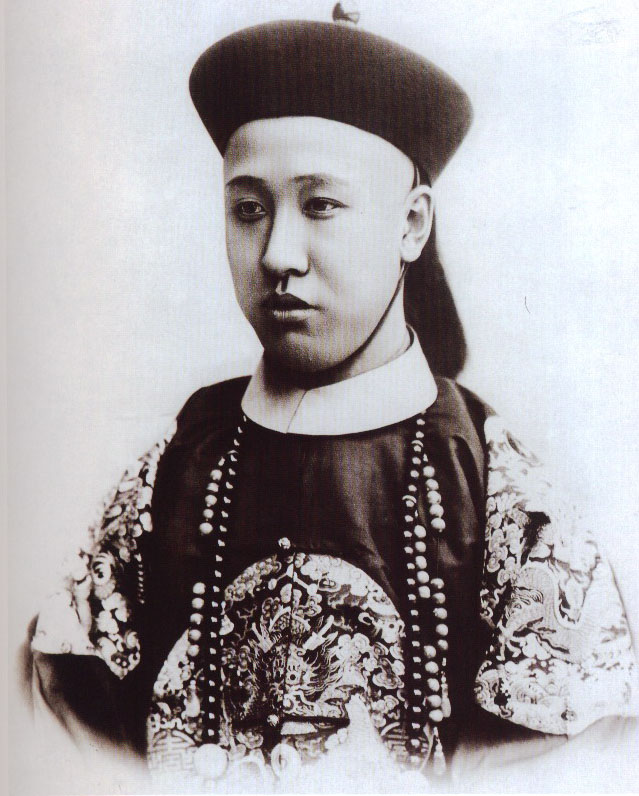
Zaifeng (Prince Chun)

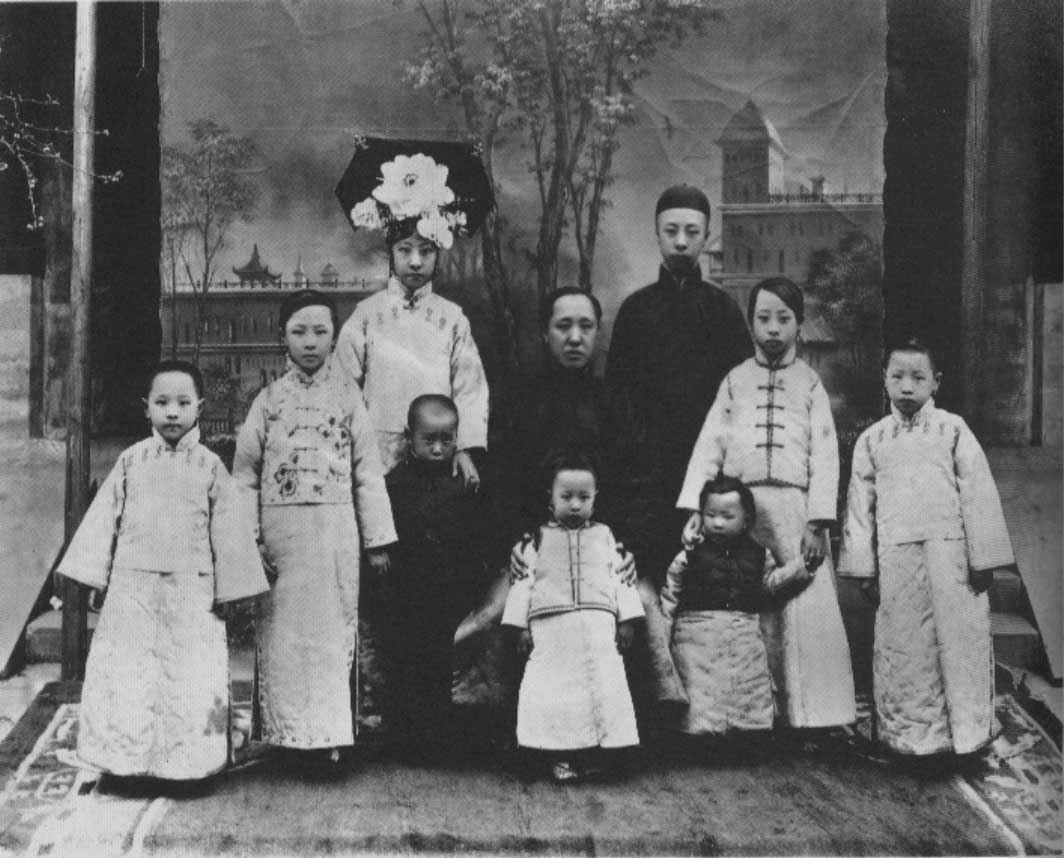
Zaifeng (Prince Chun) and his family

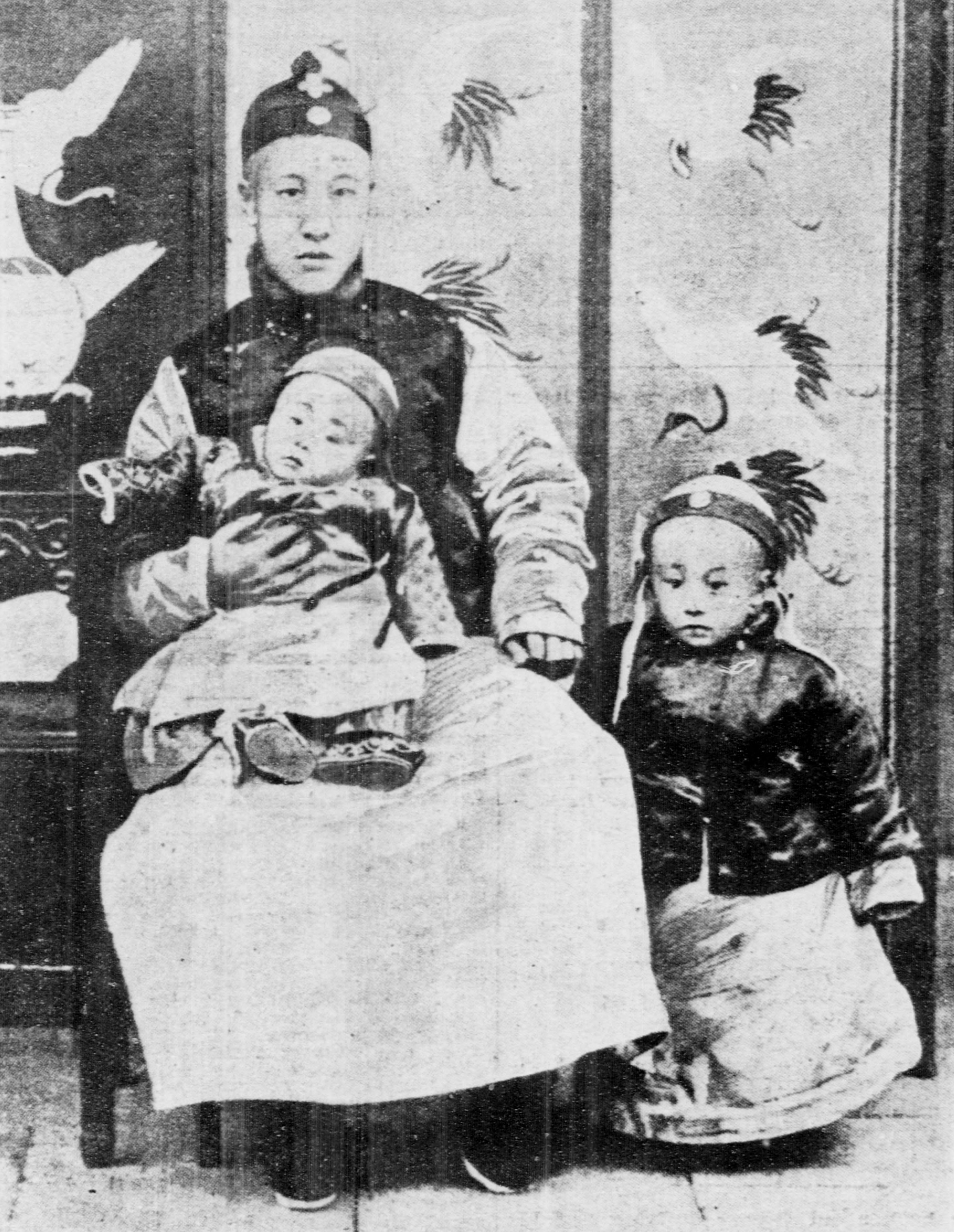
Zaifeng (Prince Chun) and his sons, Puyi and Pujie

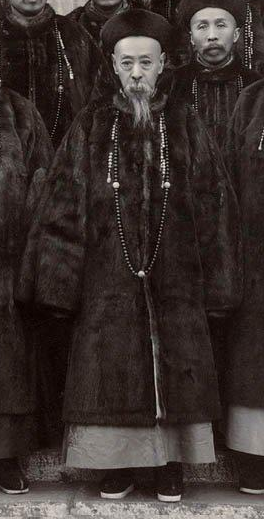
Yikuang (Prince Qing)

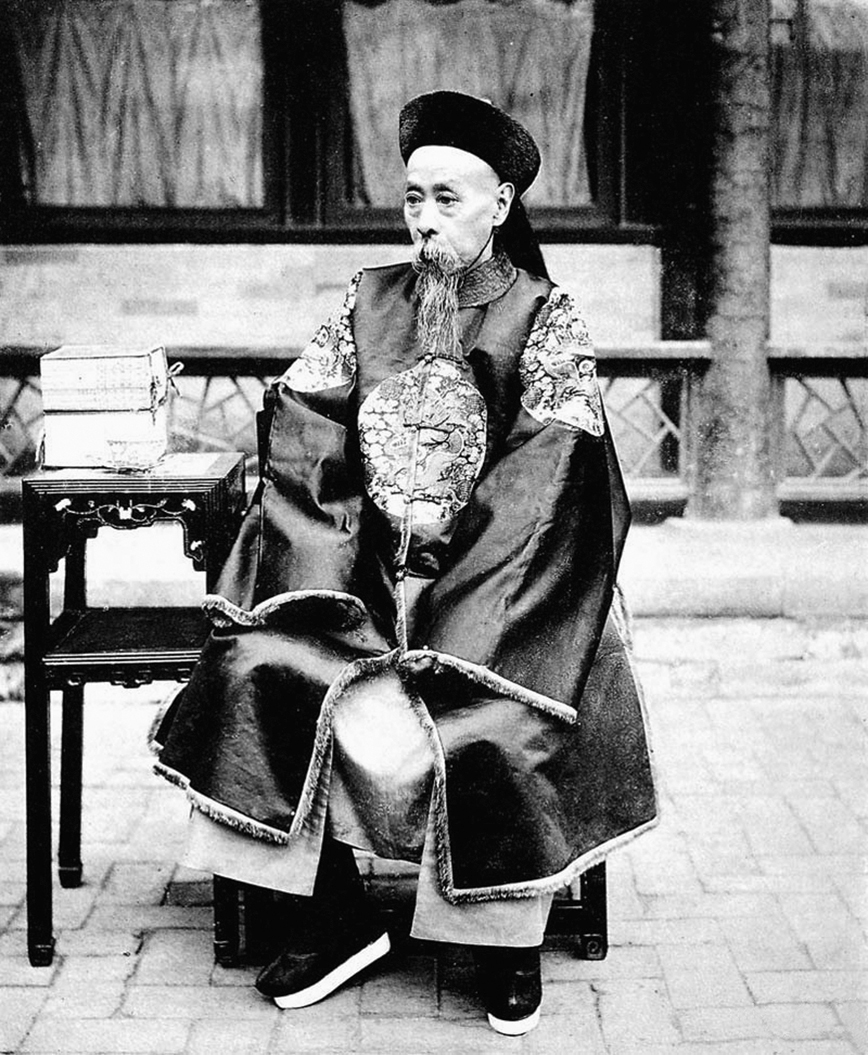
Yikuang (Prince Qing)

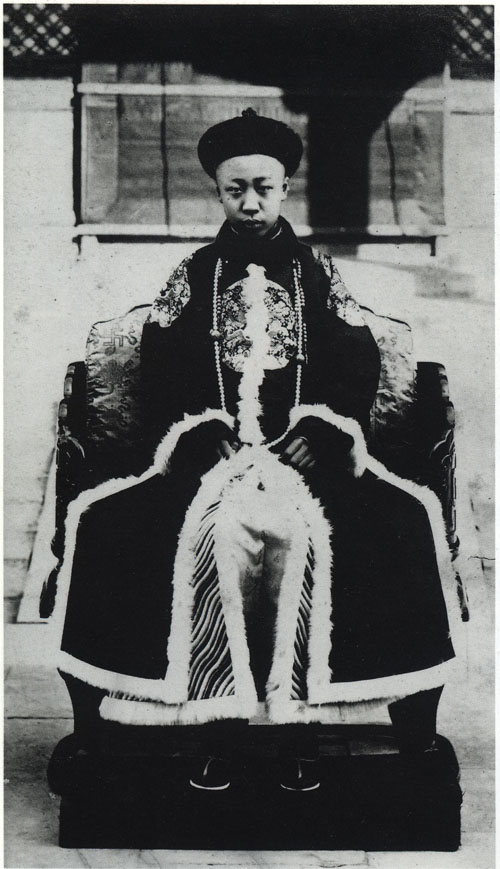
Xuantong Emperor

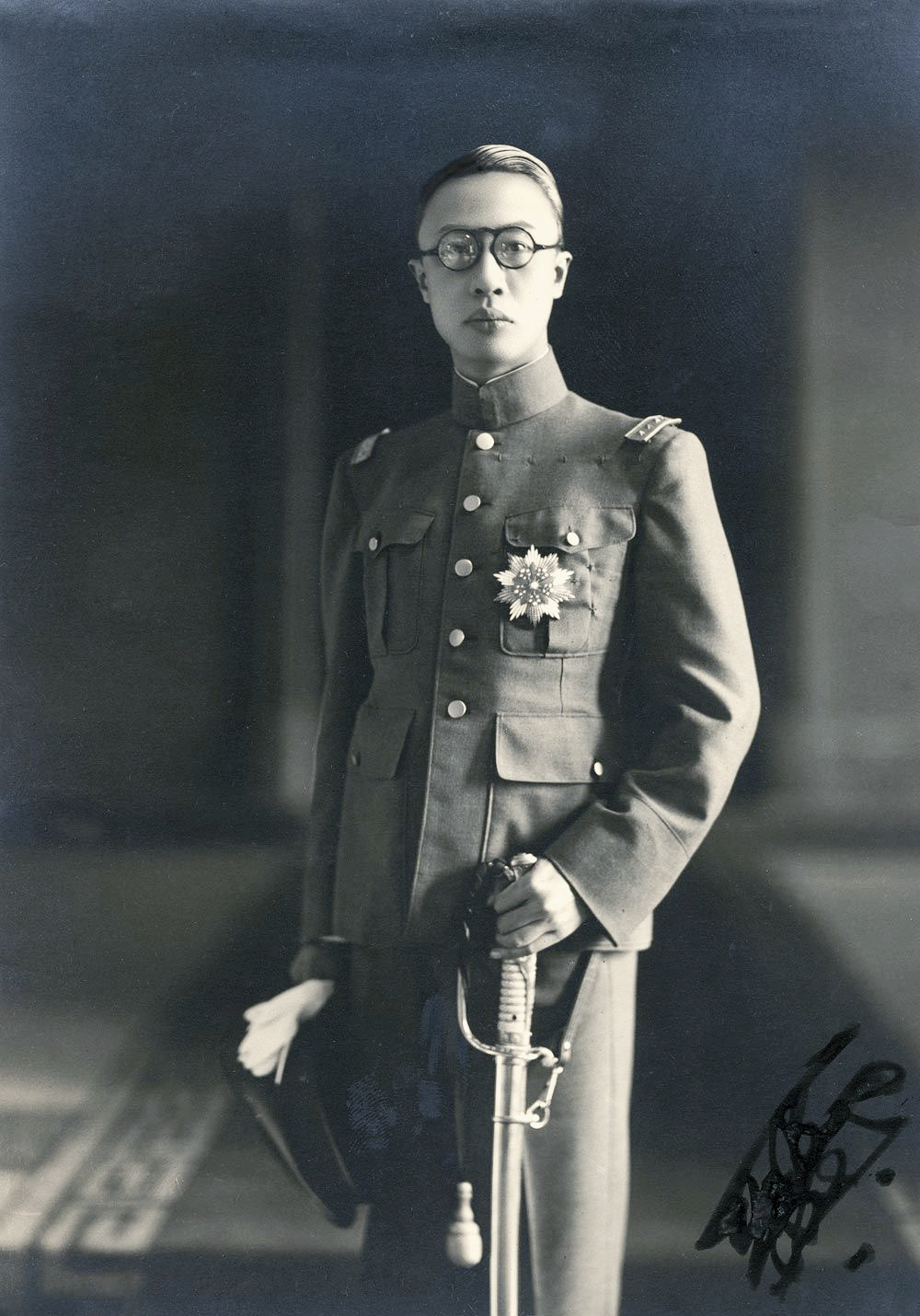
Puyi as Emperor of Manchukuo

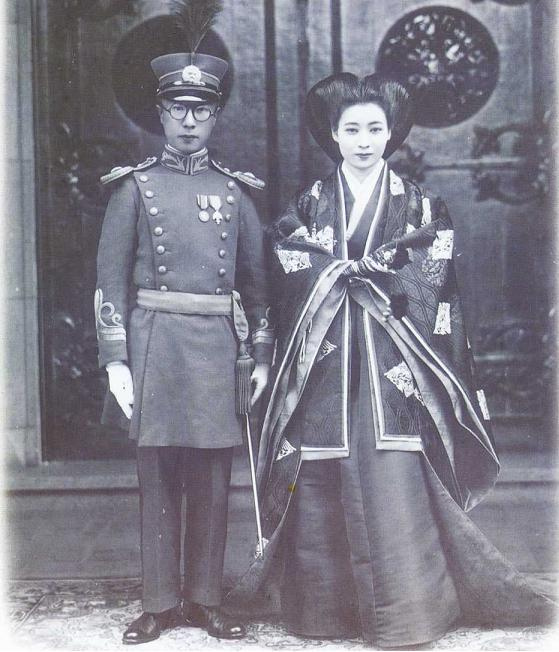
Pujie and Hiro Saga on their wedding, 1937

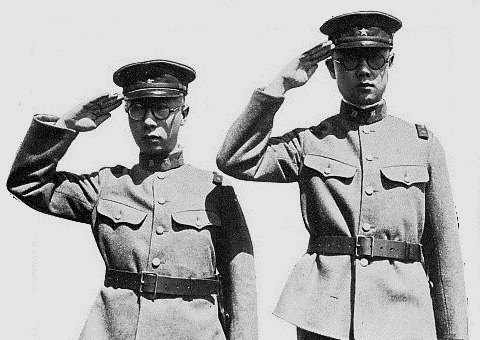
Pujie with Gobulo Runqi

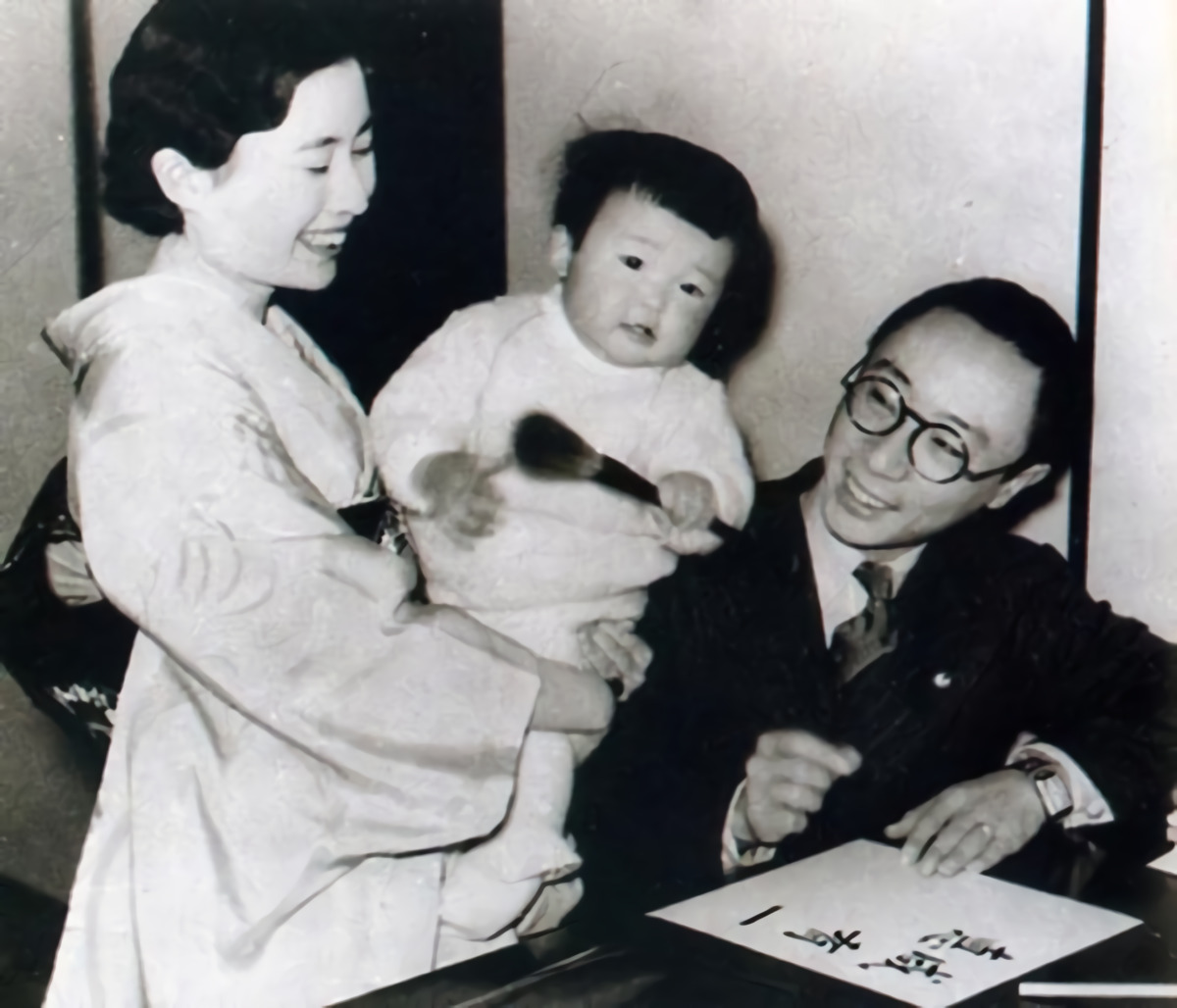
Pujie and Hiro Saga with their child

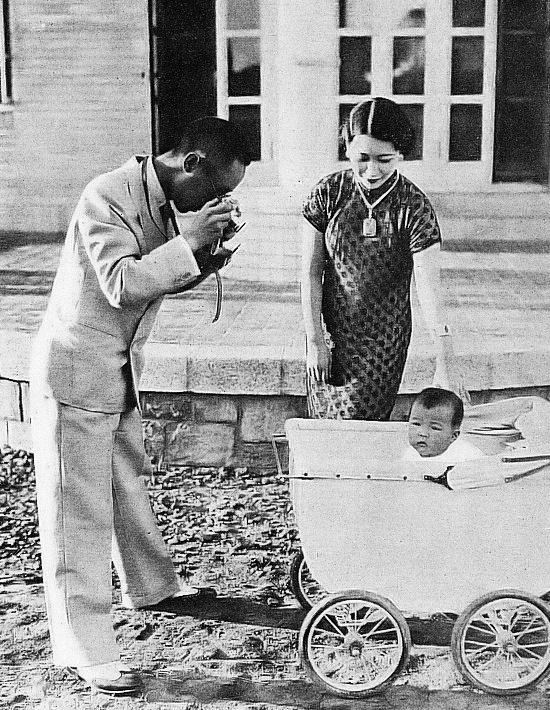
Pujie and Hiro Saga with their daughter Huisheng

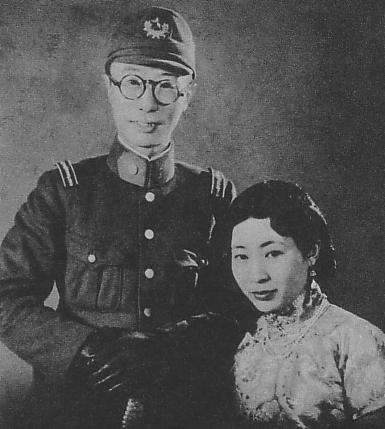
Pujie with his wife, Hiro Saga

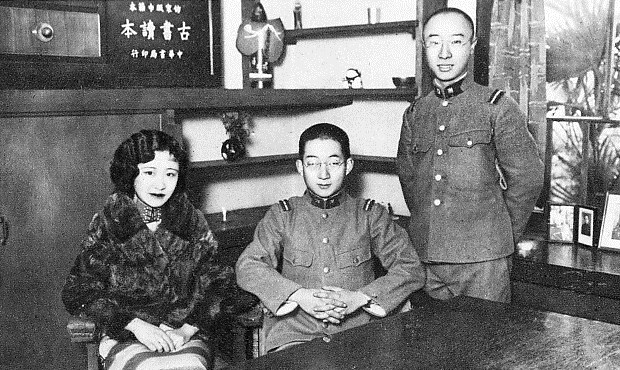
Pujie with Yunying and Runqi

== See also ==
- Gioro clan
- Manchu people
- Later Jin (1616–1636)
- Qing dynasty
- List of emperors of the Qing dynasty
- Manchu Restoration
- Manchukuo
- Researches on Manchu Origins

Imperial House House of Aisin Gioro
Preceded by House of Zhu	Ruling House of China; 1644–1912	Succeeded by Monarchy abolished
