= Gahašan Hashū =

Gahašan Hashū (Manchu: ᡤᠠᡥᠠᡧᠠᠨ
ᡥᠠᠰᡥᡡ, romanized: Gahašan Hashū; d. 1584) was a chieftain of the Irgen Gioro clan in Giyamuhu fortress. He was a brother-in-law and one of the very first supporters of Nurhaci.

== Biography ==
Gahašan Hashū's father Mutungga was the chieftain of Giyamuhu. His mother, a member of Niohuru clan, was the aunt of Eidu. Gahašan Hashū later succeeded his father's chieftain position.

In 1583, Nomina, the Chieftains of Sarhū, persuaded fellow chieftains Gahašan Hashū, and Cangsu-Yangsu brothers of Gorolo clan in Jan Bira to form an alliance with Nurhaci due to the disappointment with Nikan Wailan, Ming Dynasty-sponsored chieftain of Tulun. In order to obtain adequate military power to revenge the death of Nurhaci's father and grandfather caused by Nikan Wailan, Nurhaci agreed and conducted a formal ceremony to confirm the alliance. However, lured by Nikan Wailan, Nomina planned to betray the alliance not long after. Cangsu brothers and Gahašan Hashū then proposed to Nurhaci the plan to eliminate Nomina before he could possibly take any betrayal actions.

At the end of 1583, Nurhaci married his two sisters respectively to Yangsu and Gahašan Hashū as a process of strengthening their alliance. Meanwhile, fearing Nurhaci's revenge campaign could harm the safety of the entire Aisin Gioro clan, Nurhaci's clansman and distant uncle Longdun (龍敦) and Nurhaci's stepmother's brother Samujan (薩木佔) are planning to assassinate Nurhaci. In the first month of 1584, pretending to show willingness of negotiation, they invited Gahašan Hashū to a tribal meeting and killed him through ambush on the way to the meeting location to test the water before executing the assassination plan.

After Gahašan Hashū's death, Nurhaci launched a revenge campaign on Samujan and eventually annexed his tribe. Gahašan Hashū's son, Nacibu, was granted a title of tuwašara hafan and assigned to the Boarded White Banner after the creation of the Eight Banners socio-military system.. Gahašan Hashū's cousin Eidu later became the Founding Five Grand Ministers (開國五大臣) of the Manchu Khanate.
