= Mongke Temur =

Mongke Temur may refer to:

- Mengu-Timur, khan of the Blue Horde (1266–1280)
- Möngke Temür (Ilkhanate), ruler of Shiraz (1272–1282)
- Mengtemu (1370–1433), Jurchen chieftain
