= Fancha =

- Million of Woduoli Mansion

Million of Woduoli Mansion
- Predecessor: title granted
Names
- Aisin-Gioro Fancha (愛新覺羅·范察)
- House: Aisin Gioro

Fancha
- Chinese: 范察
Transcriptions
Standard Mandarin
- Hanyu Pinyin: Fànchá

Fancha (Manchu: ᡶᠠᠨᠴᠠ, Möllendorff: fanca, Abkai: fanqa) was the ancestor of Nurhaci. His family name is Aisin Gioro (愛新覺羅).

== History ==
He was a remote descendant of Bukūri Yongšon, and the grandfather of Fanca and Mentemu.

After a few generations, the clan was not good at all to appease its men, who betrayed it and killed all its members, but the younger son Fancha escaped.

Fancha survived legend, roughly consistent with related records the history of Korea. Fancha fled to the lower reaches of the Tumen River(圖門江) Estuary Hunchun(琿春河) Xi Guan(奚關) zongguanfu, inherited the ancestors of the dominion of Woduoli(斡朵里) Mansion.

== Family ==
- Eldest son: Huihou (揮厚)
- Second son: Rongshao Bauchi (容紹包奇)

== Bibliography ==
- "Draft History of Qing"(《清史稿》)/Volume 1
- "Memoir of Qing"(《清實錄》)/Taizu 1
