= Fuman =

- Dudu Jianzhou Left Guard

Chieftain of the Jianzhou Jurchens
- Reign: 1522 – 1542
- Predecessor: None (dynasty established)
- Successor: Giocangga
- Died: 1542; Hetu Ala
- Spouse: Empress Zhi
- Issue: Desikū; Leodan; Soocangga; Giocangga; Boolungga; Boosi
Names
- Chinese: 福滿 Fúmǎn; Manchu: Dudu Fuman; Mongolian: Фу Хүн
Posthumous name
- Emperor Zhí 直皇帝; Manchu: Gulu hūwangdi
Temple name
- Xingzu 興祖
- House: Aisin Gioro; Chinese: Àixīnjuéluó 愛新覺羅; Manchu: ᠠᡳᠰᡳᠨ ᡤᡳᠣᡵᠣ aisin gioro / aisin giuro
- Father: Sibeoci Fiyanggū

Fuman (Chinese: 福滿; Manchu: ᡶᡠᠮᠠᠨ, romanized: fuman; died 1542) was Chieftain of the Jianzhou Jurchens and an ancestor of the future Qing dynasty emperors. His father was Sibeoci Fiyanggū. His family name was Aisin Gioro (愛新覺羅).

== History ==
Fuman was the great-grandfather of Nurhaci, who would reorganise and unite various Jurchen tribes. He lived in Hetuela or Hetu Ala (赫圖阿拉). From 1522 to 1542, he was governor, known as Dudu Fuman, of the Dudu Jianzhou Left Guard (建州左衛), a post also held and established by his paternal grandfather and father Sibeoci Fiyanggū.

After Fuman died in 1542, he was buried in Hetuela's old city, also known as Xingjing (興京). In 1636, Huang Taiji established the Qing dynasty and posthumously honored Fuman as King of Qing (慶王); in 1648, he was given the posthumous name Emperor Zhi (直皇帝) and temple name Xingzu (興祖). The three ancestors, Qing Zhaozu, Jingzu and Xianzu, were buried in Xingjing. In 1659, Fuman was buried and paid respect at the Yong Mausoleum (清永陵).

== Children ==
1. Desikū (ᡩᡝᠰᡳᡴᡠ; 德世庫)
2. Liocan (ᠯᡳᠣᠴᠠᠨ; 瑠闡), also called Liu Chan (劉闡)
3. Soocangga (ᠰᠣᠣᠴᠠᠩᡤᠠ; 索長阿)
4. Giocangga (ᡤᡳᠣᠴᠠᠩᡤᠠ; 覺昌安), ancestor of Nurhaci
5. Boolangga (ᠪᠣᠣᠯᠠᠩᡤᠠ; 包朗阿)
6. Boosi (ᠪᠣᠣᠰᡳ; 寶實)

Fuman House of Odoli Born: ? Died: 1542
Regnal titles
Preceded by Sibeoci Fiyanggū	Chieftain of the Jianzhou Jurchens; 1522–1542	Succeeded by Giocangga
