= Giocangga =

Jurchen chieftain (1526–1583)

Giocangga (Manchu: ᡤᡳᠣᠴᠠᠩᡤᠠ; Chinese: 覺昌安; pinyin: Juéchāng'ān; 1526–1583) was the son of Fuman and the paternal grandfather of Nurhaci, the man who unified the Jurchen peoples and founded the Later Jin dynasty of China. Both he and his son Taksi attacked Atai's fort, which was being besieged by a rival Jurchen chieftain Nikan Wailan (ᠨᡳᡴᠠᠨ
ᠸᠠᡳᠯᠠᠨ; 尼堪外蘭 Níkān Wàilán), who promised the governance of the city to whoever would kill Atai. One of Atai's underlings rebelled and murdered him. Both Giocangga and Taksi were killed by Nikan Wailan under unclear circumstances. Giocangga, Taksi and Nikan were all under command of Li Chengliang.

Giocangga was accorded the temple name Jǐngzǔ (景祖) and the posthumous name Emperor Yi (翼皇帝) by the Qing dynasty.

In 2005, a study led by a researcher at the British Wellcome Trust Sanger Institute suggested that Giocangga might be a direct male-line ancestor of over 1.5 million men, mostly in northeastern China. This was attributed to Giocangga's and his descendants' many wives and concubines. Giocangga's descendants in the patrilineal line are concentrated among several ethnic minorities who were part of the Manchu Eight Banners system, and are not found in the Han population.

== Family ==
- Brothers
1. Desikū (ᡩᡝᠰᡳᡴᡠ; 德世庫, Déshìkù)
2. Liocan (ᠯᡳᠣᠴᠠᠨ; 瑠闡, Liúchǎn)
3. Soocangga (ᠰᠣᠣᠴᠠᠩᡤᠠ; 索長阿, Suǒcháng'ā)
4. Boolangga (ᠪᠣᠣᠯᠠᠩᡤᠠ; 包朗阿, Bāolǎng'ā)
5. Boosi (ᠪᠣᠣᠰᡳ; 寶實, Bǎoshí)
- Children: (5 sons)
1. Lidun Baturu (ᠯᡳᡩᡠᠨ
  ᠪᠠᡨᡠᡵᡠ; 禮敦巴圖魯 Lǐdūn Bātúlǔ)
2. Erguwen(ᡝᡵᡤᡠᠸᡝᠨ; 額爾袞 É'ěrgǔn)
3. Jaikan (ᠵᠠᡳᡴᠠᠨ; 界堪 Jièkān)
4. Taksi (ᡨᠠᡴᠰᡳ; 塔克世 Tǎkèshì)
5. Taca Fiyanggū (塔察 ᡨᠠᠴᠠ
  ᡶᡳᠶᠠᠩᡤᡡ; 篇古 Tǎchá Piāngǔ)

Giocangga House of Aisin-Gioro Born: 1526 Died: 1583
Regnal titles
Preceded by Fuman	Chieftain of the Jianzhou Jurchens; 1542–1571	Succeeded by Taksi
