= Tolo (Manchu) =

- Dudu Jianzhou Left Guard

Chieftain of the Jianzhou Jurchens
- Reign: 1467–1506
- Predecessor: title granted
- Died: 1506
- Issue: Toyuebeo
Names
- Aisin-Gioro Tolo (愛新覺羅·妥羅)
- House: Aisin Gioro
- Father: Cungšan

Tolo
- Chinese: 妥羅
Transcriptions
Standard Mandarin
- Hanyu Pinyin: Tuǒluō

Tolo (Manchu: ᡨ᠋ᠣᠯᠣ, romanized: tolo; died 1506) was an ancestor to the Qing dynasty. He was the eldest son of Cungšan, Nurhaci's grand uncle. His family name is Aisin Gioro (愛新覺羅); his name was translated as Tole (脫羅) and Tolv (土老).

== Life ==
In the years of Chenghua (成化) after Cungšan died and a siege with the Three Guards of Jianzhou (建州) and Ming army, the Ming economy collapsed. In the Ming dynasty, Tolo commanded the Left Guard of Jianzhou. Tolo helped recover the economy, expanding trade with the Nüzhen (女真) at the borders, and further developing agricultural production. For his contributions, the Ming dynasty promoted him to Dudu Jianzhou Left Guard.

Tolo died in 1506. His son Toyuebeo succeeded his father.

== See also ==
- Cuyan

Tolo (Manchu) House of Odoli Born: ? Died: 1506
Preceded by Cungšan	Chieftain of the Jianzhou Jurchens; 1467–1506	Succeeded by Sibeoci Fiyanggū
