= Researches on Manchu Origins =

Qing dynasty history book

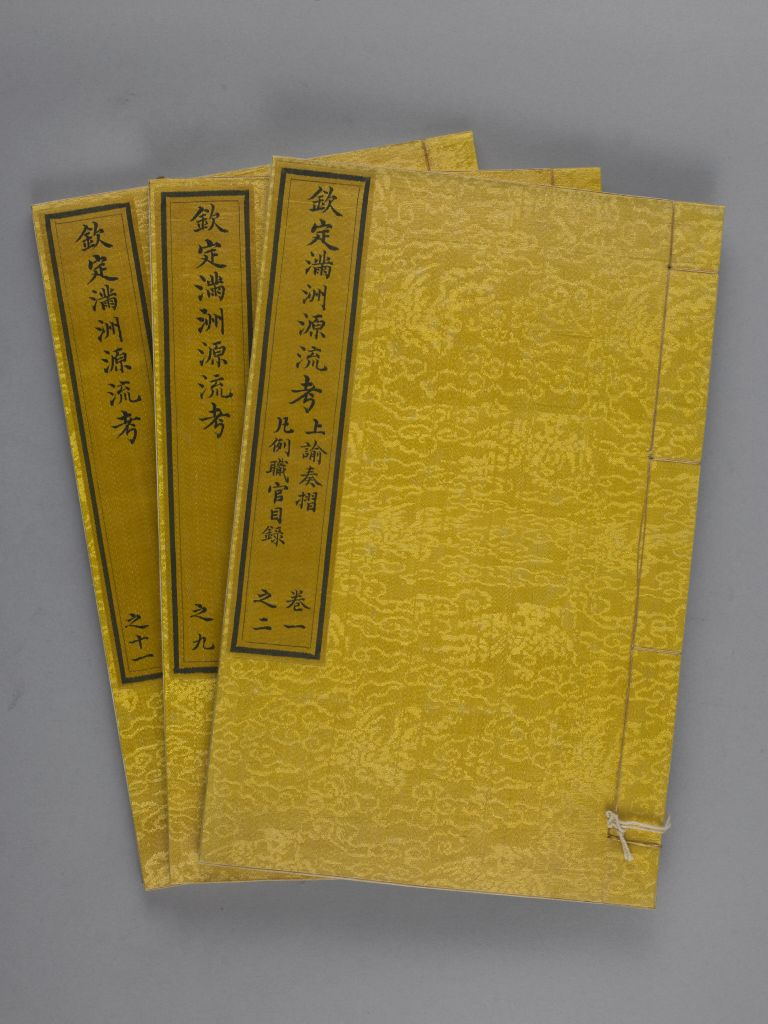

Chinese name
- Traditional Chinese: 滿洲源流考
- Simplified Chinese: 满洲源流考
Transcriptions
Standard Mandarin
- Hanyu Pinyin: Mǎnzhōu Yuánliú Kǎo

Mongolian name
- Mongolian script: ᠮᠠᠨᠵᠢᠢᠨ ᠭᠠᠷᠠᠯ ᠦᠦᠰᠯᠢᠢᠨ ᠲᠠᠯᠠᠠᠷᠺᠬᠢ ᠰᠦᠳᠠᠯᠭᠠᠠ
Transcriptions
- SASM/GNC: Manjiin garal üüsliin talaarkhi sudalgaa

Manchu name
- Manchu script: ᠮᠠᠨᠵᡠᠰᠠᡳ ᡩᠠ ᠰᡝᡴᡳᠶᡝᠨ ‍‍ᡳ ᡴᡳᠮᠴᡳᠨ ᠪᡳᡨᡥᡝ
- Abkai: Manjusai da sekiyen-i kimqin bithe
- Möllendorff: Manjusai da sekiyen-i kimcin bithe

Researches on Manchu Origins, also known as Manzhou Yuanliu Kao, is an important history book published by the Qing dynasty government in 1777. The Qianlong Emperor sponsored its compilation with the goal of legitimizing Qing rule, as well as identifying the Qing as a successor to the Jin dynasty (1115–1234). The Manzhou Yuanliu Kao also bolstered Qianlong's conception of the Manchu people as a wu, or martial, race.

It consists of 4 parts: Manchu tribes, territory, topography (mountains and rivers), and culture. Pamela Kyle Crossley analyses it as the apex of the Qing dynasty's attempt at "documentary institutionalisation" of Manchu heritage and from it, Manchu ethnic identity. Researches on Manchu Origins contained a list of corrections of transcribed Jurchen language words found in the History of Jin in Chapter 135, using the Manchu language to correct them, in Chapter 18.

== Contents ==
Manzhou Yuanliu Kao was compiled from the perspective of the Manchu ruling class, breaking away from the historical record of librarians by the Han-centric view. It is a document that shows the ethnicity that they have had since ancient times, from the Jurchen tribes to the Manchu tribes. The lineages of Jurchens and Manchus are continued in Buyeo, Samhan, Baekje, Silla, Sushen, Balhae, and Jurchen by era.

== House of Aisin-Gioro ==
The Aisin-Gioro traced its ancestry to Bukūri Yongšon, a legendary warrior of the thirteenth century. Emperor Hongtaiji claimed that Bukūri Yongšon was conceived from a virgin birth. According to the legend, three heavenly maidens, Enggulen, Jenggulen, and Fekulen, were bathing at a lake called Bulhūri Omo near the Paektu Mountain. A magpie dropped a piece of red fruit near Fekulen, who ate it. She then became pregnant with Bukūri Yongšon. However, this legend belongs to another Manchu clan, the Hurha (Hurka).

== See also ==
- Bukūri Yongšon
- Hongtaiji
