= Nikan Wailan =

Ming Dynasty Jurchen warlord

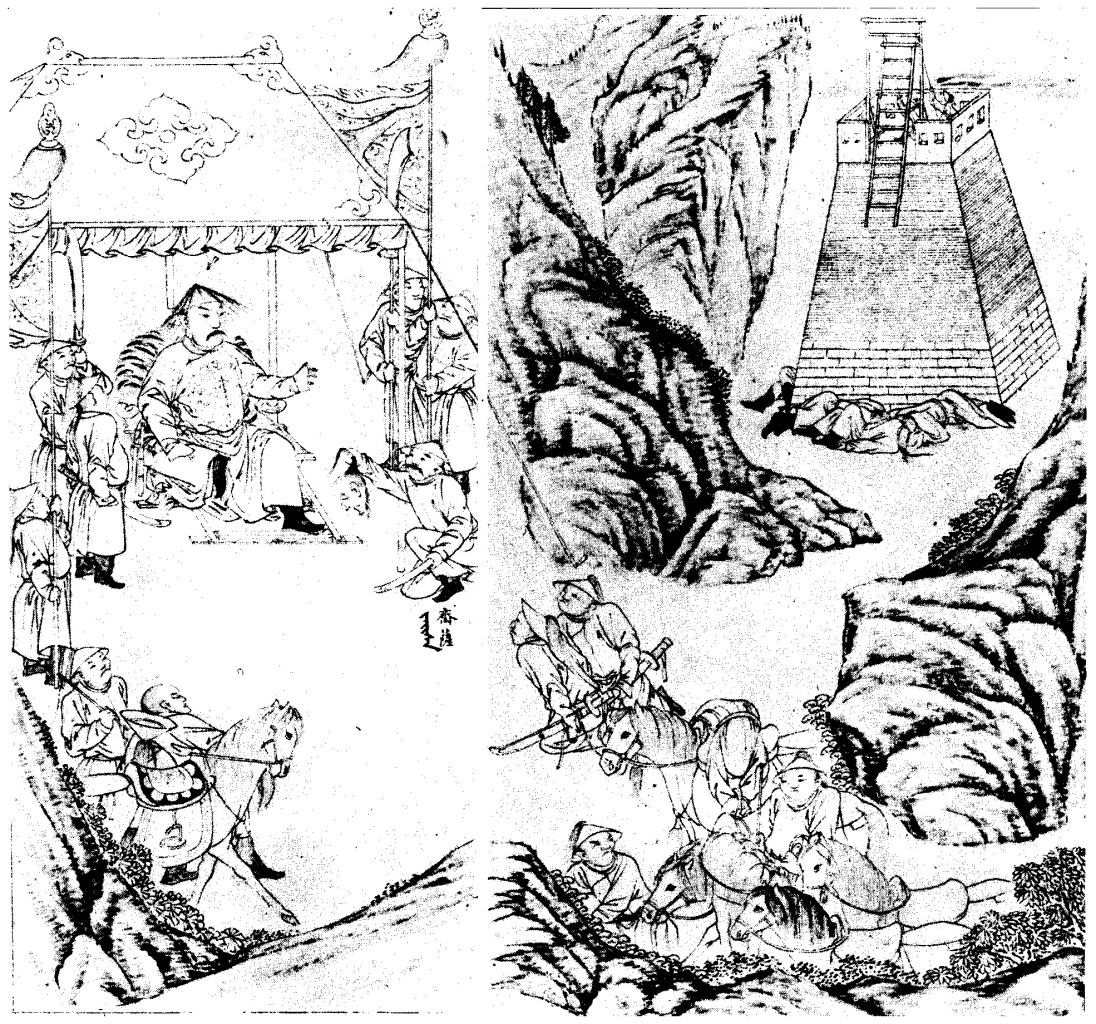
Nikan Wailan’s head presented to Nurhaci from the Manchurian Annals Volume II

Nikan Wailan (Manchu: ᠨᡳᡴᠠᠨ
ᠸᠠᡳᠯᠠᠨ, romanized: nikan wailan; simplified Chinese: 尼堪外兰; traditional Chinese: 尼堪外蘭; pinyin: Níkān Wàilán, ? - 1587) was a Jurchen leader affiliated with the Ming dynasty and a rival of Nurhaci.

== Name ==
In the Jurchen language, Nikan Wailan means "secretary of Han Chinese", thus his existence is suspected by some historians.

== Life ==
In 1582, Nurhaci's father Taksi and grandfather Giocangga were killed in an attack on Gure (in present-day Xinbin Manchu Autonomous County) by Nikan, while being led by Li Chengliang. The following year, Nurhaci began to unify the Jurchen bands around his area.

In 1584, when Nurhaci was 25, he attacked Nikan Wailan at Turun (also in Xinbin) to avenge the deaths of his father and grandfather, who are said to have left him nothing but thirteen suits of armour. Nikan Wailan fled away to Erhun, which Nurhaci attacked again in 1587. Nikan Wailan this time fled to Li Chengliang's territory. Later, as a way to build relationship, Li gave Nikan Wailan to Nurhaci, who beheaded Nikan Wailan immediately. With Li's support, Nurhaci gradually grew his strength in the following years.
