= Bukūri Yongšon =

Legendary ancestor of the House of Aisin Gioro

- Born: Bulhūri Omo, lake northeast of Golmin Šanggiyan Alin
Names
- Aisin Gioro Bukūri Yongšon (愛新覺羅·布庫里雍順)
Temple name
- Shizu (始祖)
- House: Aisin Gioro
- Mother: Fekulen

Bukūri Yongšon
- Chinese: 布庫里雍順
Transcriptions
Standard Mandarin
- Hanyu Pinyin: Bùkùlǐyōngshùn

Bukūri Yongšon (Manchu: ᠪᡠᡴᡡᡵᡳ
ᠶᠣᠩᡧᠣᠨ, romanized: Bukūri Yongšon; ? – ?) was a legendary ancestor of the future emperors of the Qing dynasty.

== Legend ==
Bukūri Yongšon was claimed the progenitor of the Aisin Gioro clan by Hong Taiji, which would be the imperial family of China in the future. According to the legend, three heavenly maidens, namely Enggulen (ᡝᠩᡤᡠᠯᡝᠨ, 恩古倫), Jenggulen (ᠵᡝᠩᡤᡠᠯᡝᠨ, 正古倫) and Fekulen (ᡶᡝᡴᡠᠯᡝᠨ, 佛庫倫), were bathing at a lake called Bulhūri Omo (ᠪᡠᠯᡥᡡᡵᡳ
ᠣᠮᠣ) near the Changbai Mountains. A magpie dropped a piece of red fruit near Fekulen, who ate it. She then became pregnant with Bukūri Yongšon.

However, another older version of the story by the Hurha (Hurka) tribe member Muksike recorded in 1635 contradicts Hong Taiji's version on location, claiming that it was in Heilongjiang province, close to the Amur river, where Bulhuri lake was located, and where the "heavenly maidens" took their bath. This was recorded in the Jiu Manzhou Dang and is much shorter and simpler in addition to being older. This is believed to be the original version and Hongtaiji changed it to Changbai mountain. It shows that the Aisin Gioro clan originated in the Amur area and the Heje (Hezhen) and other Amur valley Jurchen tribes had an oral version of the same tale. It also fits with Jurchen history since some ancestors of the Manchus originated north before the 14th-15th centuries in the Amur and only later moved south.

== Modern interpretation ==
However, some scholars believe that the so-called legend actually carries the different meanings. Zhang (2013) pointed that, in the Manchu language, the names of three "heavenly maidens", “Enggulen,” “Jenggulen,” and “Fekulen”, may be formed from the words “enen” (son), “jeje” (father), and “fefe” (mother), combined with “gulung” (babbling). Based on this interpretation, this legend could be understood as follows: "A family of three from the Hurha clan was bathing in Lake Bulhuri. After bathing with his son, the father and the son left the mother alone, who then gave birth to Bukūri Yongšon." The entire legend, while on the surface praised by Muksike and his clan as proof that the Manchu tribes were descended from goddesses, was in fact a veiled mockery suggesting that Bukūri Yongšon, the Manchu progenitor, was essentially born out of wedlock and of lowly status.

== Legacy ==
After the Qing dynasty was established, he was given the temple name "Shizu" (始祖).

== See also ==
- Researches on Manchu Origins

== Notes ==
Bukūri Yongšon House of Odoli Born: ? Died: ?
Preceded by None	Chieftain of the Jianzhou Jurchens ?–?	Succeeded by Möngke Temür
