= Agu =

- Gender: Male
- Language: Igbo

Origin
- Word/name: Igboland

Agu // is both a given name and surname. As a given name and as a surname , it is predominantly masculine of Igbo origin.

== People with the surname Agu ==
- Alloysius Agu (born 1967), Nigerian former football goalkeeper
- Chiwetalu Agu (born 1956), Nigerian film actor and producer
- Donald Agu (born 1975), Nigerian former footballer
- Festus Agu (born 1975), Nigerian former footballer
- Francis Agu (1965–2007), Nigerian actor
- Mikel Agu (born 1993), Nigerian footballer

== See also ==
- Agu language, a linguistic variety of Rawang
