= Sibeoci Fiyanggū =

- Dudu Jianzhou Left Guard

Chieftain of the Jianzhou Jurchens
- Reign: 1481–1522
- Predecessor: title granted
- Born: Unknown
- Died: 1522
- Issue: Fuman
Names
- Aisin-Gioro Sibeoci Fiyanggū (愛新覺羅·錫寶齊篇古)
Posthumous name
- Emperor Zheng (正皇帝)
- House: Aisin Gioro
- Father: Cungšan

Sibeoci Fiyanggū
- Chinese: 錫寶齊篇古
Transcriptions
Standard Mandarin
- Hanyu Pinyin: Xībǎoqípiāngǔ

Sibeoci Fiyanggū (Manchu: ᠰᡳᠪᡝᠣᠴᡳ
ᡶᡳᠶᠠᠩᡤᡡ, romanized: sibeoci fiyanggū;? died 1522), also called Shi Baoqi (石报奇), was Chieftain of the Jianzhou Jurchens. He held the position of Jianzhou Left Guard (建州左衛) from 1481 to 1522. After the Qing dynasty was established, he was officially honored with the posthumous name Emperor Zheng (正皇帝).

== Descendants ==
Sibeoci Fiyanggū was the great-great-grandfather of Nurhaci, the man who reorganized and united various Jurchen tribes. Nurhaci's descendants became the last Emperors of China during the Qing dynasty.

== Relations ==
- Father: Cungšan (充善)
- Uncle: Agu (阿古)
- Uncle: Qin Yang (秦羊)
- Uncle: Cuyan (褚宴)
- Son: Fuman

Sibeoci Fiyanggū House of Odoli Born: ? Died: 1522
Preceded by Tolo	Chieftain of the Jianzhou Jurchens; 1481–1522	Succeeded by Fuman
