= Cungšan =

Cungšan (Manchu: ᠴᡠᠩᡧᠠᠨ, Möllendorff: cungšan, Abkai: cungxan, Chinese: 充善; pinyin: Chōngshàn, sometimes written as 董山) was a chieftain of the Jurchen Jianzhou Left Guard. Cungšan was the great-great-great-grandfather of Nurhaci, the founder of the Later Jin dynasty of China. His posthumous name was Emperor Chun (純皇帝; Chún Huángdì). His father was Mengtemu.

In 1442, a succession dispute between Cungšan and his half-brother Fanca led to a division in the Jianzhou Left Guard. Cungšan inherited his father's position as head of the Jianzhou Left Guard while his brother Fanca was made head of a new separate Jianzhou Right Guard by the Ming dynasty. After the death of his half-brother Fanca, Cungšan brought the Right Guard under his control.

== Family ==
- Children:
1. Tolo (妥罗)
2. Toimo (妥义谟)
3. Sibeoci Fiyanggū (锡宝齐篇古)

Cungšan House of Odoli Born: 1419 Died: 1467
| Preceded by Möngke Temür | Chieftain of the Jianzhou Jurchens; 1433–1467 | Succeeded by Tolo |
