= Mengtemu =

Jurchen chief (1370–1433)

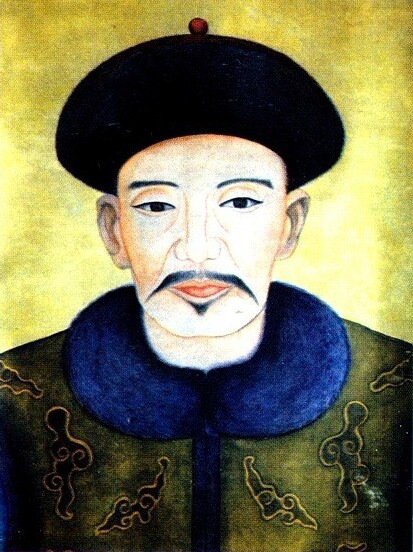
Portrait of Mengtemu

Möngke Temür (Chinese: 猛哥帖木耳; pinyin: Měnggē Tiē mù'ěr or 猛哥帖木儿; Měnggē Tiēmù'er) or Dudu Mengtemu (Manchu: ᡩᡠᡩᡠ ᠮᡝᡢᡨᡝ᠋ᠮᡠ; 孟特穆; Mèngtèmù) (1370–1433) was a Jurchen chieftain of the Odoli tribe, one of the three tribes of the lower Sunggari river valley in Manchuria. In the 1380s the tribe migrated southward towards the lower valley of the Tumen River and settled in Womuho (present day Hoeryong). As a distant ancestor of the Aisin Gioro clan which founded the Qing dynasty, Möngke Temür was accorded the posthumous name Emperor Yuan (原皇帝) and the temple name Zhaozu (肇祖) by the Shunzhi Emperor of the Qing dynasty. His son was Cungšan.

== Career ==
It is known that Mongke Temur′s father, Huihou, was the leader of a unit comprising 10,000 families, established by the Mongol Yuan Dynasty from the Odoli tribe, and was also responsible for falconry. Huihou crushed a rebellion by the Wild Jurchens against the Yuan dynasty. This sparked mutual hostility between Huihou and the Wild Jurchens. After the fall of the Yuan Dynasty, the Wild Jurchens launched a massive rebellion and attacked Möngke Temür and his people, forcing him to flee to the Tumen River.

In 1388, the Hongwu Emperor established contact with three tribes of the Jianzhou Jurchens, the Odoli, Huligai and Tuowen and attempted to enlist them as allies against the Mongols. There was a general migration south of the various Jurchen groups around the start of the 15th century and the three tribes established themselves around the Tumen River (near the modern border of China, Russia and North Korea). Not long afterwards, the various Jurchens began accepting Ming titles from the Yongle Emperor as the Military Commanders of the three Wei, namely Jianzhou Wei (建州衛), Jianzhou Left Wei (建州左衛) and Jianzhou Right Wei (建州右衛). The Wei (衛) was military unit composed of 5 Suo (所), and each Suo was staffed with 1100 soldiers. As Military Commanders of Wei, they were required to go to Beijing every year to pay tribute to the Emperor.

In 1395, he visited the Joseon court to present tribute to the Taejo of Joseon. As a result, in 1404, he was awarded an honorary military position by the Koreans.

During this time, the Ming court frequently sent envoys to local chieftains to persuade local chieftains to recognize the suzerainty of the Ming emperor, however Möngke Temür did not respond. This was to the delight of the Korean court and in 1405, he was nominated to be a myriarch under the Korean king. In April 1405, a Ming envoy of Jurchen origin Wang Jiaohuati, was sent to Korea to persuade the Korean king along with Möngke Temür to enter into tributary relations with the Ming.

Ahacu (阿哈出), later also known as Li Sicheng (李思誠), chief of the Huligai, became commander of the Jianzhou Wei (建州衛) in 1403, named after a Yuan Dynasty political unit in the area. Möngke Temür of the Odoli became leader of the Jianzhou Left Wei (建州左衛) and accepted the Chinese surname of Tóng (童) not long afterward.

The Koreans tried to persuade Möngke Temür to reject the Ming dynasty's overtures, but was unsuccessful since Möngke Temür submitted to the Ming. The Korean king ordered Möngke Temür not to comply with the request of Ming, he first complied with this order only to capitulate, visiting Nanjing in September 1405, leaving with an appointment as regional commissioner.

In the following years, the Jurchen tribes along with Möngke Temür's Odoli tribe fought skirmishes and battles with the Koreans. With the constant insecurity in the presence of the Koreans, Meng and his followers migrated westward, settling in May 1411 in Fengzhou, in the valley of the Hoifa river, an affluent of the Sunggari river, where the Jianzhou guard under Šigiyanu (Li Xianzhong) was located.

Here the Ming government would establish the Jianzhou Left Guard from the existing Jianzhou guard with Möngke Temür as the regional commander of the new guard.

During this time, the Yongle Emperor began frequently sending expeditionary forces towards the Mongols, Möngke Temür and his followers would take part in one such expedition in 1422. With the threat of retaliatory invasions of the Mongols and the growing dominance of Möngke Temür, Li Manzhu, and his followers, who numbered more than six thousand were forced to leave Fengzhou and head back to Womuho in 1423.

After his return, Möngke Temür decided that the best policy of self-preservation would be to serve both Ming and Korean interests. In 1426, he visited Beijing and was awarded a promotion as assistant commissioner in chief. His half brother Fanca visited Beijing in 1432, presented tribute, and was promoted to assistant commissioner. In 1432, Möngke Temür visited Beijing again and was promoted to commissioner in chief while Fanca was made a regional commissioner. Starting in 1427, Möngke Temür had begun sending his eldest son Agu to visit the Korean court with the hopes that Agu would become a royal bodyguard in Korea.

On November 30, 1433, Möngke Temür and his son Agu were killed in a riot led by Yang Mutawuta, a Jurchen battalion commander from a different tribe in the area of Kaiyuan. Yang Mutawuta had followed Mongke Temur and his son.

Mengtemu House of Odoli Born: 1370 Died: 1433
Preceded by Bukūri Yongšon	Chieftain of the Jianzhou Jurchens; 1405–1433	Succeeded by Cungšan
