= Timeline of the Jurchens =

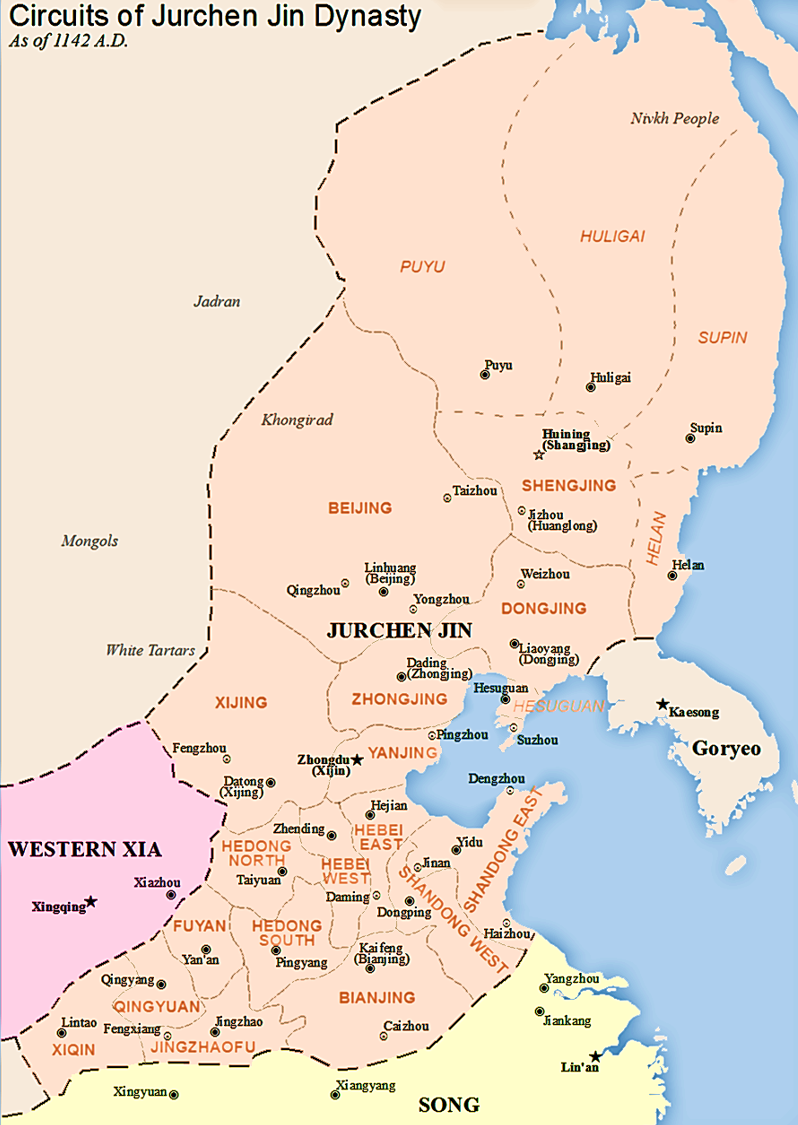
Jin dynasty (1115–1234)

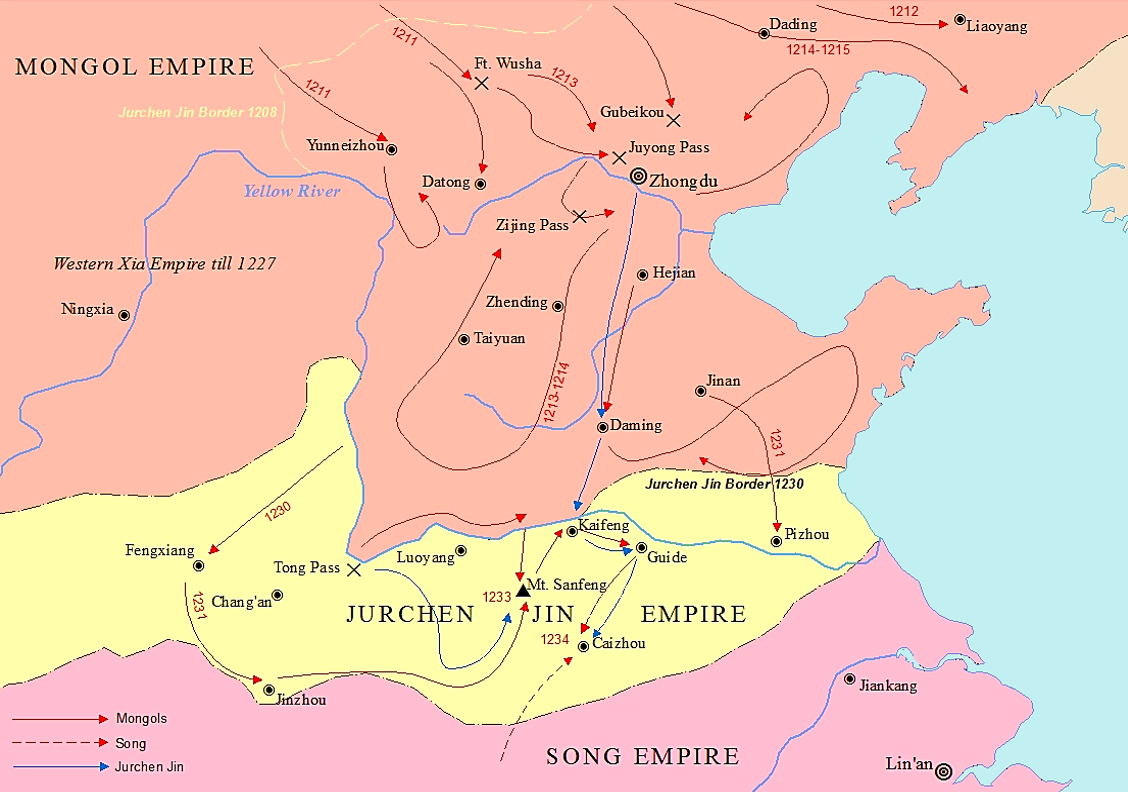
Mongol Conquest of Jin (1211–1234)

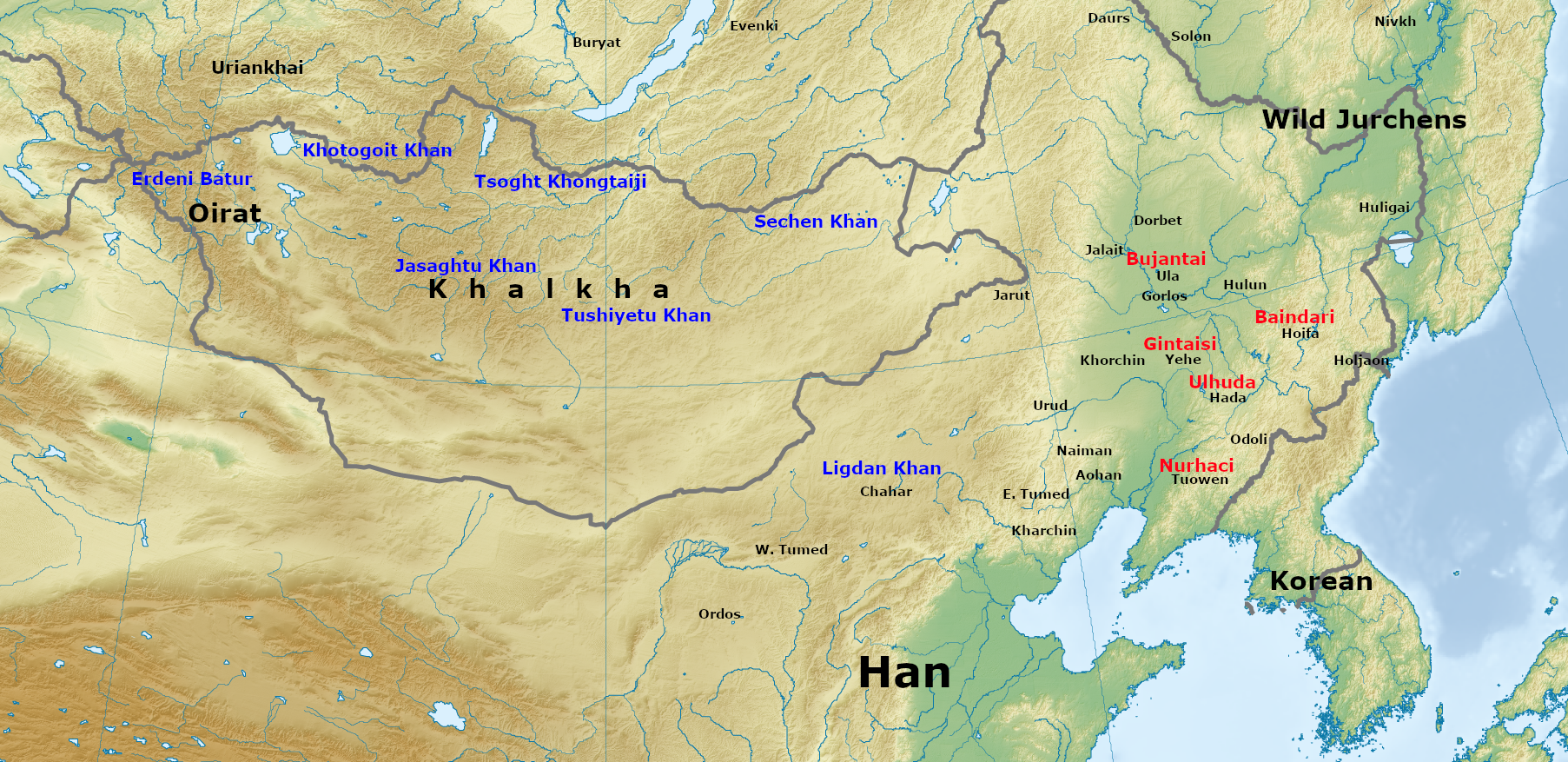
Ethnic map of northeast Asia prior to Jurchen unification into the Manchu people (early 17th century)

This is a timeline of the Jurchens.

== 7th century ==
Year	Date	Event
667		Bojang of Goguryeo plots with Mohe people to revive Goguryeo

== 8th century ==
Year	Date	Event
748		Jurchens (Ruzhe) are mentioned for the first time bearing tribute to the Tang court

== 10th century ==
Year	Date	Event
900		Hanpu of the Wanyan clan is recorded to have lived around this time
907	27 February	Khitan chieftain Abaoji, also known as Emperor Taizu of Liao, becomes khagan of the Khitans
925		A Jurchen embassy bears tribute to the Later Tang court
960	February	Zhao Kuangyin declares himself Emperor Taizu of Song, replacing Later Zhou
961		Jurchens bear tribute to the Song dynasty
973		Jurchens raid Liao dynasty
976		Jurchens raid Liao dynasty
986		Jurchens prevent Goryeo from expanding into the Yalu River basin
991		Khitans attempt to prevent the Jurchens from contacting the Song dynasty by erecting palisades to block the land route
994-996		Goryeo builds forts in Jurchen territory south of the Yalu River

== 11th century ==
Year	Date	Event
1010		Second conflict in the Goryeo–Khitan War: Jurchens ally with Goryeo in a conflict against the Khitans and emerge victorious
1038	10 November	Li Yuanhao declares himself Emperor Jingzong of Western Xia
1051		Goryeo repels a Jurchen attack and beheads 20 people
1056		Goryeo repels a Jurchen attack and wipes out 20 villages that made up their base
1074		Wugunai of the Wanyan clan unites the Jurchens of eastern and northern Manchuria and is succeeded by his son, Wanyan Helibo
1080		Munjong of Goryeo leads a force of 30,000 into Jurchen territory and conquers ten villages
1092		Wanyan Helibo is succeeded by his brother Wanyan Polashu
1094		Wanyan Polashu is succeeded by his brother Wanyan Yingge

== 12th century ==
=== 1100s ===
Year	Date	Event
1103		Wanyan Yingge is succeeded by his nephew Wanyan Wuyashu
1104		Wanyan clan enters Goryeo territory in pursuit of enemy tribes and defeat Im Gan, taking Chongju castle
1107		Goryeo invasion led by Yun Kwan into Jurchen territory succeeds and builds Nine Fortresses in the area
1108		Goryeo returns the Nine Fortresses region to the Wanyan clan, possibly in exchange for Poju (Uiju); Yun Kwan is removed from office

=== 1110s ===
Year	Date	Event
1113		Wanyan Wuyashu is succeeded by his brother Wanyan Aguda
1114		Wanyan Aguda attacks the Liao dynasty
1115	spring	Wanyan Aguda declares himself emperor of the Jin dynasty, named after the Ashi River, the "Golden River"
1116		Gao Yongchang rebels against the Liao dynasty and asks the Jurchens for help and ends up getting annexed by the Jin dynasty
1117		Emperor Taizu of Jin defeats the Khitan army of the Liao dynasty
1118		Emperor Taizu of Jin captures the Liao dynasty's Eastern Capital

=== 1120s ===
Year	Date	Event
1120		Emperor Taizu of Jin captures the Liao dynasty's Supreme Capital
1121		Emperor Taizu of Jin captures the Liao dynasty's Central Capital
1122		Jin dynasty conquers the Western Capital and Southern Capital
1123		Yelü Dashi is captured by the Jin dynasty and leads an attack on Emperor Tianzuo of Liao, who escapes; afterwards Yelü Dashi escapes from the Jurchens and rejoins the emperor
1123		Zhang Jue rebels in Ping Prefecture and defects to the Song dynasty but the Jin dynasty immediately retaliates and crushes his army; Zhang Jue is executed by the Song as reconciliation towards the Jin
1123	19 September	Emperor Taizu of Jin dies and is succeeded by his brother Wuqimai, who becomes Emperor Taizong of Jin
1124		Emperor Tianzuo of Liao attacks the Jin dynasty despite warnings from Yelü Dashi
1124		Jin dynasty vassalizes the Western Xia
1125	26 March	Emperor Tianzuo of Liao is captured by the Jin dynasty; so ends the Liao dynasty
1125	November	Jin dynasty invades the Song dynasty and occupies Shanxi and Hebei
1126	31 January	Jin army lays siege to Kaifeng - earliest recorded use of thunderclap bombs
1126	5 March	Jin army retreats from Kaifeng after the Song dynasty promises to pay an annual indemnity
1126	summer	Jin dynasty vassalizes Goryeo
1126	June	Jin dynasty defeats two Song armies
1126	December	Jin army returns with fire arrows and gunpowder bombs and lays siege to Kaifeng
1127	9 January	Jingkang incident: Kaifeng falls to the Jin dynasty and emperors Qinzong and Huizong are captured; territory north of the Huai River is annexed by the Jin - earliest recorded use of "molten metal bombs", suspected to contain gunpowder
1129		Former Song official Liu Yu is enthroned as emperor of the Jin puppet state of Qi
1129		Yelü Dashi annexes two Jin tribes

=== 1130s ===
Year	Date	Event
1132		Siege of De'an: Jin dynasty fails to capture De'an - earliest recorded use of the fire lance
1132		Yelü Yudu rebels against the Jurchens
1134		Yelü Dashi launches an invasion of the Jin dynasty, which ends in failure
1135	9 February	Emperor Taizong of Jin dies and Hela, a grandson of Emperor Taizu of Jin, succeeds him as Emperor Xizong of Jin
1135		Jin puppet state Qi captures Xiangyang
1135		Yue Fei of the Song dynasty retaliates and recaptures much of the lost territory
1137		The Jin puppet state of Qi is dissolved and Liu Yu is sent off to live out his life under supervised retirement
1137		Khitans raid Jin dynasty

=== 1140s ===
Year	Date	Event
1140		Yue Fei launches a successful attack against the Jin and makes considerable territorial gains, but is forced to withdraw by Emperor Gaozong of Song
1142	October	Song and Jin agree to the Treaty of Shaoxing which stipulates that the Song must pay Jin an annual indemnity; the Huai River is settled as the boundary between the two states
1146		Khabul Khan of the Khamag Mongols rebels against the Jin dynasty

=== 1150s ===
Year	Date	Event
1150	9 January	Emperor Xizong of Jin is murdered by his cousin, Wanyan Liang, who ascends the Jin throne as "Prince of Hailing"
1152		The Prince of Hailing relocates to the Central Capital
1153		The Jin dynasty starts issuing paper money called jiaochao ('exchange notes')
1157		The Prince of Hailing orders the destruction of palace structures in the Supreme Capital

=== 1160s ===
Year	Date	Event
1161		Khitans rebel against the Jin dynasty
1161	27 October	The Prince of Hailing's cousin Wulu is proclaimed Emperor Shizong of Jin in a coup
1161	16 November	Battle of Tangdao: A Song fleet sinks a Jin fleet off the shore of Shandong peninsula - earliest recorded use of fire arrows in naval combat
1161	26–27 November	Battle of Caishi: Song treadmill boats sink a Jin fleet on the Yangtze - earliest recorded use of thunderclap bombs in ship combat
1161	15 December	The Prince of Hailing is murdered by a group of officers
1163		The Khitan rebellion is defeated by the Jin dynasty
1165		Song and Jin conclude a peace treaty

=== 1170s ===
Year	Date	Event
1175		Naimans and Kankalis submit to the Jin dynasty

=== 1180s ===
Year	Date	Event
1189	20 January	Emperor Shizong of Jin dies and his grandson Madage succeeds him as Emperor Zhangzong of Jin

=== 1190s ===
Year	Date	Event
1190		The Tatars declare independence from the Jin dynasty
1192		Jin dynasty starts constructing fortifications in the northwest to prevent depredations by the Mongols
1196		Jin and Mongol troops carry out a punitive expedition against the Tatars
1194		The Yellow River changes course and causes mass devastation to surrounding regions

== 13th century ==
=== 1200s ===
Year	Date	Event
1204		Song forces start showing military aggression along the Jin border
1206	spring	Kokochu, also known as Teb Tengri, chief shaman of the Mongols, bestows upon Temüjin the title of Genghis Khan, "Oceanic Ruler" of the Mongol Empire, at the kurultai of Burkhan Khaldun, sacred mountain of the Mongols
1206	20 June	Song dynasty declares war on Jin dynasty
1206	December	The governor-general of Sichuan, Wu Xi, defects to the Jin dynasty
1207	29 March	Song loyalists kill Wu Xi
1207		Song forces slaughter a Jin camp, killing 2000 men and 800 horses - earliest recorded use of thunderclap bombs in open combat
1207	April	Song and Jin enter a stalemate
1208	2 November	Song and Jin agree to a peace renewing the Song's tributary relationship with the Jin
1208	29 December	Emperor Zhangzong of Jin dies and his uncle, Wanyan Yongji, takes the Jin throne and becomes "Prince Shao of Wei"

=== 1210s ===
Year	Date	Event
1210		Genghis Khan breaks off tributary relations with the Jin dynasty
1211	October	Battle of Yehuling: Genghis Khan invades the Jin dynasty and defeats their army before retreating
1212	autumn	Mongols attack the Jin dynasty
1212		Yelü Liuge along with his Khitan followers in northern and central Manchuria defect to the Mongols
1213	spring	Mongols break through the Juyong Pass and plunder Hebei, Shandong, and Shanxi
1213	11 September	Prince Shao of Wei is murdered by the general Hushahu, who installs the previous ruler's nephew Wudubu as Emperor Xuanzong of Jin
1214	winter	Mongols blockade the Central Capital but retreat after peace negotiations
1214		Emperor Xuanzong of Jin relocates to the Southern Capital
1214		Yang Anguo rebels against the Jin dynasty in Shandong and is crushed
1214		Jin troops attack Yelü Liuge but fails
1215	spring	Jurchen general Wannu declares independence and the state of Dazhen at the Supreme Capital
1215	31 May	Battle of Zhongdu: Mongols return and capture the Central Capital
1215		"Red Coat" rebels rise up in Shandong
1217		Jin dynasty invades Song dynasty but is repelled
1217		Western Xia invades Jin dynasty but is repelled

=== 1220s ===
Year	Date	Event
1221		Jin troops take Qi Prefecture - earliest recorded use of iron casing bombs
1224	14 January	Emperor Xuanzong of Jin dies and his son Ningjiasu succeeds him as Emperor Aizong of Jin
1224		Song and Jin cease hostilities
1225		Jin and Western Xia cease hostilities
1227	September	Emperor Mozhu of Western Xia surrenders to the Mongol Empire and is promptly executed; so ends the Western Xia

=== 1230s ===
Year	Date	Event
1230		Ögedei Khan of the Mongol Empire renews the invasion of the Jin dynasty
1231		Jin troops destroy a Mongol warship - earliest recorded use of thunder crash bombs
1232	8 April	Siege of Kaifeng (1232): Mongol general Subutai lays siege to Kaifeng - earliest recorded use of reusable fire lances
1233		Emperor Aizong of Jin flees Kaifeng
1233	29 May	Siege of Kaifeng (1232): Kaifeng surrenders to the Mongols
1233		Mongols annex the state of Dazhen and take Wannu prisoner
1234	9 February	Siege of Caizhou: Emperor Aizong of Jin abdicates to a distant relative, Hudun, who becomes Emperor Mo of Jin, and commits suicide; Emperor Mo of Jin is killed by the Mongols; so ends the Jin dynasty

=== 1280s ===
Year	Date	Event
1287		Hand cannons are employed by the troops of Yuan Jurchen commander Li Ting in putting down a rebellion by Mongol prince Nayan.

== 15th century ==
=== 1400s ===
Year	Date	Event
1403	December	Akhachu of the Jianzhou Jurchens accepts the Ming proposition to establish a guard in his region
1404		Mentemu of the Left Jianzhou Jurchens pays tribute to Joseon
1405		Mentemu of the Left Jianzhou Jurchens pays tribute to the Ming dynasty

=== 1410s ===
Year	Date	Event
1411		Ming dynasty sends Yishiha into Manchuria to create the Nurgan Regional Military Commission
1413		Yongning Temple Stele: Ming dynasty sends Yishiha to the Nurgan Regional Military Commission to create postal stations and spread Buddhism
1417		A Ming Prefectural Buddhist Registry is founded in Jianzhou

=== 1420s ===
Year	Date	Event
1426		Ming dynasty sends Yishiha to the Wild Jurchens to construct shipyards and warehouses

=== 1430s ===
Year	Date	Event
1432		Ming dynasty sends Yishiha to present seals to Ming-allied Jurchens and to repair the Yongning Temple
1433		Mentemu of the Left Jianzhou Guard dies
1434		Joseon defeats Li Manzhu of Jianzhou Jurchens
1437		Joseon defeats Li Manzhu of Jianzhou Jurchens

=== 1440s ===
Year	Date	Event
1442		Fanca becomes leader of the Right Jianzhou Guard while Dongshan becomes leader of the Left Jianzhou Guard

=== 1460s ===
Year	Date	Event
1466		The Ming execute Dongshan
1467		A Ming-Joseon expedition defeats the Jianzhou Jurchens and kill Li Manzhu

=== 1470s ===
Year	Date	Event
1470		The governor of Liaodong, Chen Yue, attacks the Jurchens and demands bribes from Jurchen embassies

=== 1480s ===
Year	Date	Event
1480		Ming dynasty ceases hostile relations with the Jurchens

== 16th century ==
=== 1520s ===
Year	Date	Event
1522		Ming dynasty reimposes trade restrictions on the Jurchens

=== 1540s ===
Year	Date	Event
1548		The Hulun Confederation is formed under Wang Tai, chieftain of the Hada tribe

=== 1570s ===
Year	Date	Event
1570		Wang Gao of the Jianzhou Guard raids Ming settlements
1574		Li Chengliang kills Wang Gao with the help of Giocangga and Taksi

=== 1580s ===
Year	Date	Event
1582		Li Chengliang defeats Atai, son of Wang Gao, and burns his fort to the ground, also inadvertently killing Giocangga, whose son Taksi is killed by Ming forces in the confusion
1583		Nurhaci becomes leader of the "Jianzhou Left Guard" from Li Chengliang
1587		Nurhaci founds Fe Ala
1589		Nurhaci obtains the title of assistant commissioner-in-chief from the Ming dynasty

=== 1590s ===
Year	Date	Event
1592		Japanese invasions of Korea (1592–98): Nurhaci offers to fight the Japanese but is refused; Ming reacts with alarm to the size and quality of Nurhaci's troops
1593		Battle of Gure: Nurhaci defeats the Hulun Confederation and Khorchin Mongols
1595		Nurhaci obtains the title of dragon-tiger general from the Ming dynasty

== 17th century ==
=== 1600s ===
Year	Date	Event
1600		Nurhaci creates the Banner Army
1601		Nurhaci subjugates the Hada
1603		Nurhaci and Ming generals agree to delineate the boundary between their territories
1603		Nurhaci moves his capital to Hetu Ala due to water problems at Fe Ala
1605		Gwanghaegun of Joseon sends an expedition north of the Tumen River to destroy the Jurchen Holjaon community
1607		Nurhaci subjugates the Hoifa

=== 1610s ===
Year	Date	Event
1611		Nurhaci subjugates the Wild Jurchens
1613		Nurhaci incorporates the Ula into his confederation
1615		Nurhaci increases the number of banners from four to eight
1615		Nurhaci sends his last tributary emissary to Beijing
1616		Nurhaci establishes the Later Jin dynasty and rules as Khan
1618	7 May	Nurhaci announces the Seven Grievances which effectively declares war against the Ming dynasty
1618	9 May	Battle of Fushun: Later Jin seizes Fushun
1618	summer	Battle of Qinghe: Later Jin takes Qinghe
1619	18 April	Battle of Sarhū: Ming forces are annihilated by Later Jin
1619	26 July	Battle of Kaiyuan: Later Jin takes Kaiyuan
1619	3 September	Battle of Tieling: Later Jin takes Tieling
1619	September	Battle of Xicheng: Later Jin annexes the Yehe Jurchens
		Chahar-Jurchen War: Ligdan Khan attacks Guangning, a horse trading town under the protection of Nurhaci, but is defeated

=== 1620s ===
Year	Date	Event
1621	4 May	Battle of Shen-Liao: Later Jin seizes Shenyang
1621	December	Battle of Fort Zhenjiang: Ming raids into Later Jin are repulsed
1622	11 March	Battle of Guangning: Later Jin seizes Guangning
1625		Chahar-Jurchen War: Ligdan Khan's attack is turned back by a combined Khorchin Jurchen force
1626	10 February	Battle of Ningyuan: A Later Jin attack on Ningyuan is repulsed and Nurhaci is wounded
1626	30 September	Nurhaci succumbs to his wounds and dies
1627	January - March	Later Jin invasion of Joseon: Hong Taiji is elected khan and subjugates Joseon
1627	spring	Battle of Ning-Jin: Later Jin forces under Hong Taiji attack Jinzhou but are repelled
1629	winter	Jisi Incident: Later Jin forces break through the Great Wall and loot the region around Beijing

=== 1630s ===
Year	Date	Event
1630	summer	Jisi Incident: Later Jin forces retreat
1631	21 November	Battle of Dalinghe: Later Jin seizes Dalinghe
1633	April	Wuqiao Mutiny: Shandong rebels defect to Later Jin
1633	summer	Siege of Lüshun: Later Jin seizes Lüshun
1634		Chahar-Jurchen War: Ligdan Khan of the Chahar Mongols is overthrown and displaced by Hong Taiji, who takes the Imperial Seal of the Mongols
1635		Hong Taiji unites all Jurchen tribes under the name of Manchu; so ends the Jurchens

== See also ==
- Timeline of the Song dynasty
- Timeline of the Ming dynasty
- Timeline of the Tanguts
- Timeline of the Khitans

== Bibliography ==
- Andrade, Tonio (2016), The Gunpowder Age: China, Military Innovation, and the Rise of the West in World History, Princeton University Press, ISBN 978-0-691-13597-7.
- Asimov, M.S. (1998), History of civilizations of Central Asia Volume IV The age of achievement: A.D. 750 to the end of the fifteenth century Part One The historical, social and economic setting, UNESCO Publishing
- Barfield, Thomas (1989), The Perilous Frontier: Nomadic Empires and China, Basil Blackwell
- Barrett, Timothy Hugh (2008), The Woman Who Discovered Printing, Great Britain: Yale University Press, ISBN 978-0-300-12728-7 (alk. paper)
- Beckwith, Christopher I (1987), The Tibetan Empire in Central Asia: A History of the Struggle for Great Power among Tibetans, Turks, Arabs, and Chinese during the Early Middle Ages, Princeton University Press
- Breuker, Remco E. (2010), Establishing a Pluralist Society in Medieval Korea, 918-1170: History, Ideology and Identity in the Koryŏ Dynasty, Brill's Korean Studies Library, vol. 1, Leiden: Brill, pp. 220-221, ISBN 978-9004183254
- Brown, Kerry (2014), Berkshire Dictionary of Chinese Biography, Berkshire Publishing Group LLC
- Beckwith, Christopher I. (2009), Empires of the Silk Road: A History of Central Eurasia from the Bronze Age to the Present, Princeton University Press, ISBN 978-0-691-13589-2
- Crossley, Pamela Kyle (1997), The Manchus, Blackwell Publishers Ltd
- Biran, Michal (2005), The Empire of the Qara Khitai in Eurasian History: Between China and the Islamic World, Cambridge Studies in Islamic Civilization, Cambridge, England: Cambridge University Press, ISBN 0521842263
- Bregel, Yuri (2003), An Historical Atlas of Central Asia, Brill
- Chase, Kenneth Warren (2003), Firearms: A Global History to 1700, Cambridge University Press, ISBN 978-0-521-82274-9
- Drompp, Michael Robert (2005), Tang China And The Collapse Of The Uighur Empire: A Documentary History, Brill
- Ebrey, Patricia Buckley (1999), The Cambridge Illustrated History of China, Cambridge: Cambridge University Press, ISBN 0-521-66991-X (paperback).
- Ebrey, Patricia Buckley; Walthall, Anne; Palais, James B. (2006), East Asia: A Cultural, Social, and Political History, Boston: Houghton Mifflin, ISBN 0-618-13384-4
- Elliott, Mark C. (2001), The Manchu Way: The Eight Banners and Ethnic Identity in Late Imperial China, Stanford University Press, ISBN 9780804746847
- Golden, Peter B. (1992), An Introduction to the History of the Turkic Peoples: Ethnogenesis and State-Formation in Medieval and Early Modern Eurasia and the Middle East, OTTO HARRASSOWITZ · WIESBADEN
- Graff, David A. (2002), Medieval Chinese Warfare, 300-900, Warfare and History, London: Routledge, ISBN 0415239559
- Graff, David Andrew (2016), The Eurasian Way of War Military Practice in Seventh-Century China and Byzantium, Routledge, ISBN 978-0-415-46034-7.
- Haywood, John (1998), Historical Atlas of the Medieval World, AD 600-1492, Barnes & Noble
- Latourette, Kenneth Scott (1964), The Chinese, their history and culture, Volumes 1-2, Macmillan
- Lorge, Peter (2005), War, Politics and Society in Early Modern China, 900–1795, Routledge, ISBN 978-0-203-96929-8
- Lee, Ki-baik (1984), A New History of Korea, translated by Wagner, Edward W.; Schultz, Edward J., Harvard University Press, ISBN 978-0-674-61576-2
- Lorge, Peter A. (2008), The Asian Military Revolution: from Gunpowder to the Bomb, Cambridge University Press, ISBN 978-0-521-60954-8
- Luttwak, Edward N. (2009), The Grand Strategy of the Byzantine Empire, The Belknap Press of Harvard University Press
- Millward, James (2009), Eurasian Crossroads: A History of Xinjiang, Columbia University Press
- Mote, F. W. (2003), Imperial China: 900–1800, Harvard University Press, ISBN 978-0674012127
- Narangoa, Li (2014), Historical Atlas of Northeast Asia, 1590-2010: Korea, Manchuria, Mongolia, Eastern Siberia, New York: Columbia University Press, ISBN 9780231160704
- Needham, Joseph (1986), Science & Civilisation in China, vol. V:7: The Gunpowder Epic, Cambridge University Press, ISBN 0-521-30358-3
- Rong, Xinjiang (2013), Eighteen Lectures on Dunhuang, Brill
- Schafer, Edward H. (1985), The Golden Peaches of Samarkand: A study of T'ang Exotics, University of California Press
- Shaban, M. A. (1979), The ʿAbbāsid Revolution, Cambridge: Cambridge University Press, ISBN 0-521-29534-3
- Sima, Guang (2015), Bóyángbǎn Zīzhìtōngjiàn 54 huánghòu shīzōng 柏楊版資治通鑑54皇后失蹤, Yuǎnliú chūbǎnshìyè gǔfèn yǒuxiàn gōngsī, ISBN 978-957-32-0876-1
- Skaff, Jonathan Karam (2012), Sui-Tang China and Its Turko-Mongol Neighbors: Culture, Power, and Connections, 580-800 (Oxford Studies in Early Empires), Oxford University Press
- Standen, Naomi (2007), Unbounded Loyalty Frontier Crossings in Liao China, University of Hawai'i Press
- Swope, Kenneth (2014), The Military Collapse of China's Ming Dynasty, Routledge
- Tsien, Tsuen-Hsuin (1985), Paper and Printing, Needham, Joseph Science and Civilization in China:, vol. 5 part 1, Cambridge University Press, ISBN 0-521-08690-6
- Twitchett, Denis C. (1979), The Cambridge History of China, Vol. 3, Sui and T'ang China, 589–906, Cambridge University Press
- Twitchett, Denis (1994), "The Liao", The Cambridge History of China, Volume 6, Alien Regime and Border States, 907-1368, Cambridge: Cambridge University Press, pp. 43–153, ISBN 0521243319
- Twitchett, Denis (1998), The Cambridge History of China Volume 7 The Ming Dynasty, 1368—1644, Part I, Cambridge University Press
- Twitchett, Denis (1998b), The Cambridge History of China Volume 8 The Ming Dynasty, 1368—1644, Part 2, Cambridge University Press
- Twitchett, Denis (2008), The Cambridge History of China Volume 9 The Ch'ing Empire to 1800, Part 1, Cambridge University Press
- Wakeman, Frederic (1985), The Great Enterprise: The Manchu Reconstruction of Imperial Order in Seventeenth-Century China, vol. 1, University of California Press
- Twitchett, Denis (2009), The Cambridge History of China Volume 5 The Sung dynasty and its Predecessors, 907-1279, Cambridge University Press
- Wang, Zhenping (2013), Tang China in Multi-Polar Asia: A History of Diplomacy and War, University of Hawaii Press
- Wilkinson, Endymion (2015), Chinese History: A New Manual, 4th edition, Cambridge, MA: Harvard University Asia Center distributed by Harvard University Press, ISBN 9780674088467
- Xiong, Victor Cunrui (2000), Sui-Tang Chang'an: A Study in the Urban History of Late Medieval China (Michigan Monographs in Chinese Studies), U OF M CENTER FOR CHINESE STUDIES, ISBN 0892641371
- Xiong, Victor Cunrui (2009), Historical Dictionary of Medieval China, United States of America: Scarecrow Press, Inc., ISBN 978-0810860537
- Xu, Elina-Qian (2005), HISTORICAL DEVELOPMENT OF THE PRE-DYNASTIC KHITAN, Institute for Asian and African Studies 7
- Xue, Zongzheng (1992), Turkic peoples, 中国社会科学出版社
- Yuan, Shu (2001), Bóyángbǎn Tōngjiàn jìshìběnmò 28 dìèrcìhuànguánshídài 柏楊版通鑑記事本末28第二次宦官時代, Yuǎnliú chūbǎnshìyè gǔfèn yǒuxiàn gōngsī, ISBN 957-32-4273-7
- Yule, Henry (1915), Cathay and the Way Thither: Being a Collection of Medieval Notices of China, Vol I: Preliminary Essay on the Intercourse Between China and the Western Nations Previous to the Discovery of the Cape Route, Hakluyt Society
