= Battle of Qinghe =

Military conflict between the Jurchen Later Jin and Ming dynasty in 1618

- Part of the Ming–Qing transition
| Date | Summer 1618 |
| Location | Qinghechengzhen, Benxi Manchu Autonomous County, China |
| Result | Later Jin victory |

Belligerents
| Later Jin dynasty | Ming dynasty |

Commanders and leaders
| Nurhaci | Zou Chuxian † |

Strength
| Unknown | 6,400 |

Casualties and losses
| Heavy | Complete annihilation |

The Battle of Qinghe (Chinese: 清河堡之戰) was a military conflict between the Later Jin dynasty and the Ming dynasty in the summer of 1618. The battle ended with the Later Jin's takeover of Qinghe despite suffering heavy casualties.

== Background ==
The Jin army had conquered the fortress of Fushun and defeated a Ming force 10,000 strong. After resting for a month in Hetu Ala, Nurhaci set out again to take the fortress of Qinghe.

After the initial Jin attack on Fushun, the Ming court assigned the military commanders Li Rubai and Yanghao to Liaodong. The fortress of Qinghe was reinforced from several hundred men to a garrison force of 6,400. Yang Hao advised the commander of Qinghe, Zou Chuxian, to lay an ambush for the Jin in a nearby mountain pass with cannons. However, Zou opted to stay in the fortress.

== Course of battle ==
Nurhaci arrived at Qinghe and besieged it. The defenders fired cannons and hurled logs and boulders at the enemy. Despite sustaining heavy casualties, the Jin army was able to take the northwest corner of the wall before the defenders could reload their cannons. The battle continued within the city from street to street until the entire city was slaughtered. Zou died in combat.

The Jin army fanned out from Qinghe and took an additional 11 nearby towns, reaching as far as Shenyang. An advance force laid siege to Shenyang but was repulsed by Li Rubai and He Shixian, suffering 230 casualties.

== Aftermath ==
Liu Ting arrived at Shanhai Pass, which marked the border between China proper and Liaodong. He immediately began training recruits from far off Sichuan, but stressed to the Ming court that he needed more time.

Ming's Ministry of Revenue raised taxes three-hundredths of a tael per mu to help fund training and supply costs for the Liaodong defense. The court also put a bounty of 10,000 taels on Nurhaci's head.

== Location ==
The battle took place near the modern town of Qinghechengzheng (清河城镇), shortened either to Qinghecheng or Qinghe, in Benxi Manchu Autonomous County. This is not to be confused with modern Qinghe District, Tieling.

== See also ==
- Timeline of the Ming dynasty
- Timeline of the Qing dynasty

== Bibliography ==
- Swope, Kenneth (2014), The Military Collapse of China's Ming Dynasty, Routledge
- Wakeman, Frederic (1985), The Great Enterprise: The Manchu Reconstruction of Imperial Order in Seventeenth-Century China, vol. 1, University of California Press
