= Battle of Xicheng =

- Part of the Ming-Qing transition
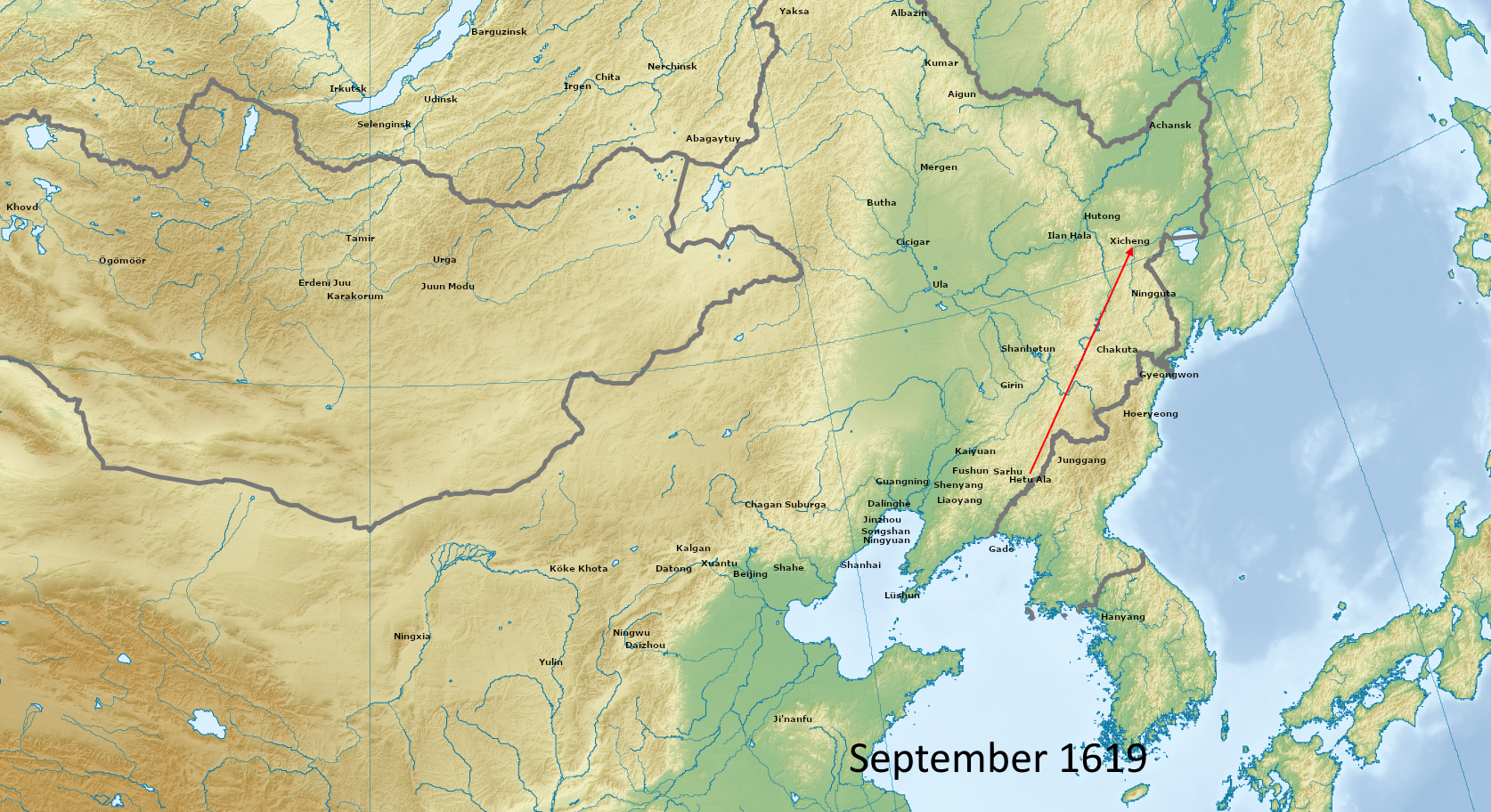
Date	September 1619
Location	Xicheng, China (modern Lishu County, Jilin province)
Result	Later Jin victory

Belligerents
Later Jin	Yehe Jurchens; Ming dynasty

Commanders and leaders
Nurhaci	Gintaisi

Strength
Unknown	Unknown

Casualties and losses
Unknown	Unknown

The Battle of Xicheng was a military conflict between the Yehe Jurchens, their Ming allies, and the Later Jin. In the fall of 1619 Nurhaci invaded Xicheng, the home of the Yehe Jurchens. Nurhaci personally led the vanguard and took the east wall. After capturing the city the Yehe inhabitants were spared, but their Ming allies who had fought beside them were executed.

== Bibliography ==
- Swope, Kenneth (2014), The Military Collapse of China's Ming Dynasty, Routledge
- Wakeman, Frederic (1985), The Great Enterprise: The Manchu Reconstruction of Imperial Order in Seventeenth-Century China, vol. 1, University of California Press
