= Chahar-Jurchen War =

- Part of the Qing conquest of the Ming
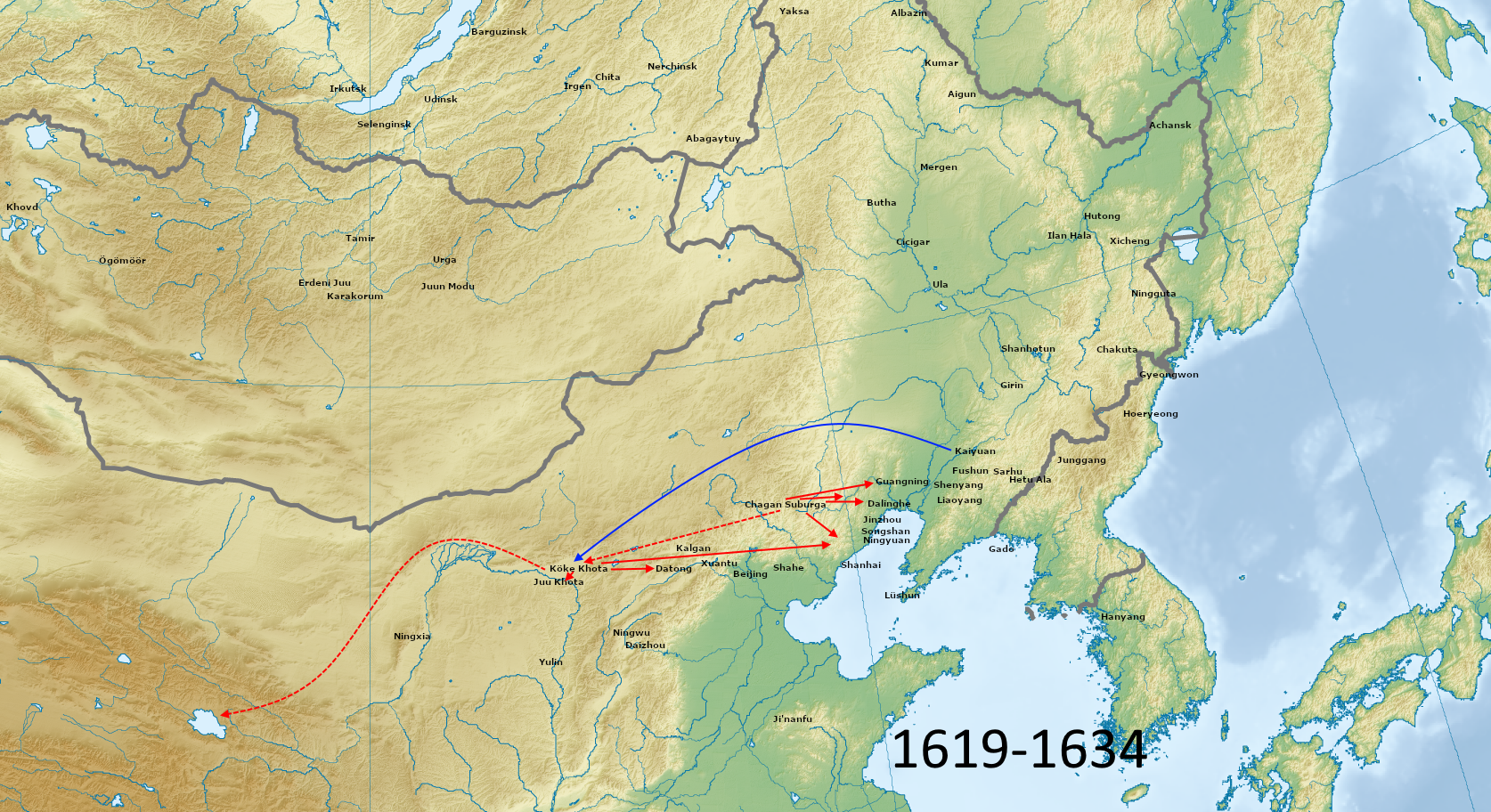
Date	1619–1634
Location	Northeast Asia
Result	Later Jin victory

Belligerents
Chahars	Later Jin; Khorchin Mongols

Commanders and leaders
Ligdan Khan	Nurhaci; Hong Taiji; Dorgon; Oboi; Hooge; Shi Tingzhu

The Chahar–Jurchen War was a military conflict waged between the Chahar Mongols and the Jurchen-led Later Jin dynasty and several other Mongol groups from 1619 to 1634.

== Background ==
Ligdan Khan of the Chahar Mongols sought to restore Chahar hegemony over the southern Mongols. He sought alliances with the Khalka Mongols, the Ming dynasty, and the Yehe Jurchens to counter the power of Nurhaci and his Later Jin dynasty.

== War ==
In 1619, Ligdan Khan attacked Guangning, a horse trading town under the protection of Nurhaci. He was defeated.

Arbitrary treatment of his allies led to their defection to the Jurchens from 1622 to 1624.

Another attack by Ligdan in 1625 was turned back by a combined Khorchin–Jurchen force.

In 1627, Ligdan attacked the Khorchins for blocking his access to the horse trade. However he was turned back and forced further west, where he attacked the Tumed Mongols, taking Köke Khota from Boshtu Khan.

In 1628, Ligdan was defeated by a Mongol alliance at Juu Khota.

In 1629, Ligdan attacked the Ming dynasty at Datong and extracted a large subsidies from them.

In 1631, Ligdan launched a last offensive against the Khorchin, however his allies deserted him.

In 1632, Ligdan came under attack from Hong Taiji. In 1634, he fled west but died of smallpox at Qinghai Lake, and the Chahars were incorporated into the Eight Banners.

== Aftermath ==
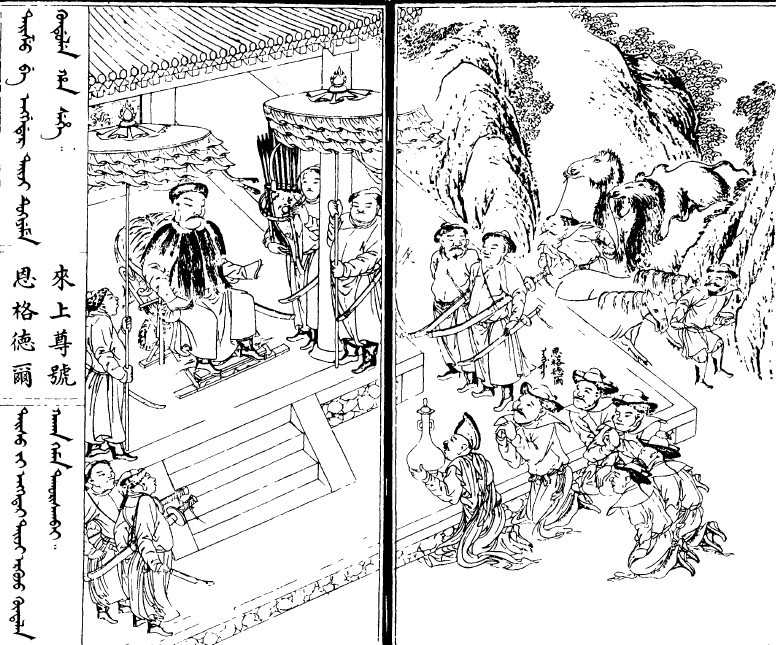
Engedaer, a Khalkha Mongol, paying respect to Nurhaci in 1606

The defeat of Ligdan Khan in 1634, in addition to winning the allegiance of the Southern Mongol hordes, brought a vast supply of horses to the Qing dynasty (renamed from the Later Jin dynasty in 1636), while denying the same supply to the Ming. The Qing also captured the Great Seal of the Mongol Khans, giving them the opportunity to portray themselves as heirs of the Yuan dynasty as well.

== Bibliography ==
- Narangoa, Li (2014), Historical Atlas of Northeast Asia, 1590-2010: Korea, Manchuria, Mongolia, Eastern Siberia, New York: Columbia University Press, ISBN 9780231160704
- Swope, Kenneth (2014), The Military Collapse of China's Ming Dynasty, Routledge
- Wakeman, Frederic (1985), The Great Enterprise: The Manchu Reconstruction of Imperial Order in Seventeenth-Century China, vol. 1, University of California Press
