= Battle of Tieling =

- Part of the Ming-Qing transition
| Date | September 3, 1619 |
| Location | Tieling, China |
| Result | Later Jin occupied Tieling. |

Belligerents
| Later Jin | Ming dynasty |

Commanders and leaders
| Nurhaci | Li Ruzhen |

Strength
| Unknown | Unknown |

Casualties and losses
| Unknown | Unknown |

The Battle of Tieling was a military conflict between the Later Jin and Ming dynasty. In the summer of 1619 Nurhaci invaded the town of Tieling, the ancestral home of the Li clan. Ming had fortified the town with cannons, but many of their soldiers defected to the Jin, and they were unable to reload their cannons before the walls were taken. Li Ruzhen, one of the last scions of the Tieling Li, fled the battle.

== Bibliography ==
- Swope, Kenneth (2014), The Military Collapse of China's Ming Dynasty, Routledge
- Wakeman, Frederic (1985), The Great Enterprise: The Manchu Reconstruction of Imperial Order in Seventeenth-Century China, vol. 1, University of California Press
