= Battle of Fort Zhenjiang =

- Part of the Ming-Qing transition
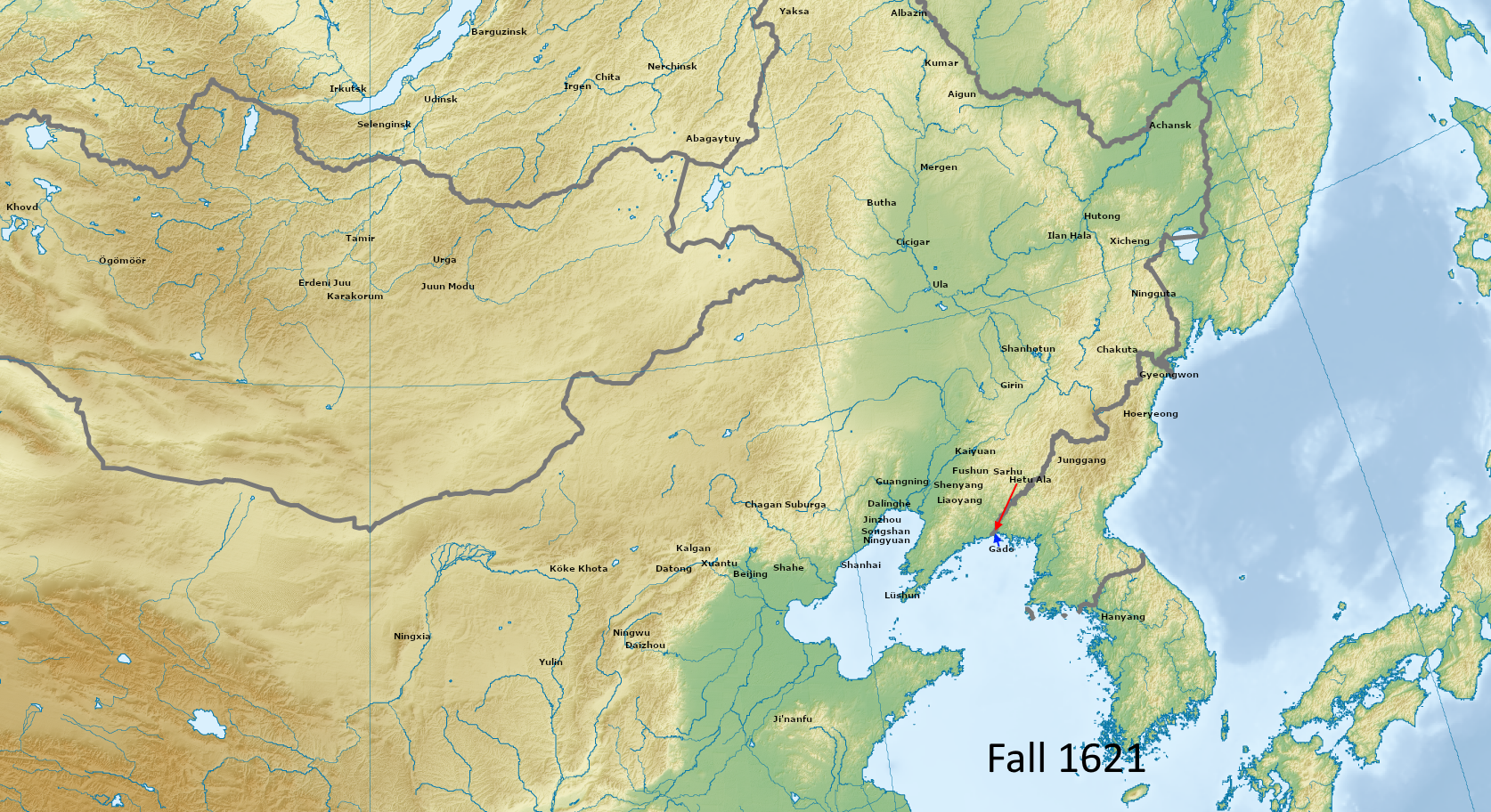
Date	Fall 1621
Location	Liaodong, China
Result	Ming tactical victory

Belligerents
Later Jin	Ming dynasty

Commanders and leaders
Nurhaci	Mao Wenlong

Strength
Unknown	197 marines 4 ships

Casualties and losses
Unknown	Unknown

The Battle of Fort Zhenjiang (Chinese: 鎮江之戰) was a military conflict between the Later Jin and the Ming dynasty. In the fall of 1621 Ming general Mao Wenlong captured Fort Zhenjiang on the border of the Jin-Joseon border and held it against multiple Jin assaults before retreating. Nurhaci burnt down the fort afterwards rather than risk having it captured again.

== Background ==
After the Ming loss at the Battle of Shen-Liao, Ming general Mao Wenlong began raiding Jin territory from his base on Ka Island ("Pidao") near the mouth of the Yalu River. Mao worked in conjunction with Joseon units and successfully damaged some Jin outposts.

== Course of battle ==
With 197 men on 4 ships, Mao arrived at Zhu Island, where he recruited commoners discontent with Jin rule. Mao then sent spies to Fort Zhenjiang, where they made contact with commoners and set up signals to open the gate when ready. Fort Zhenjiang was taken with ease as a few dozen garrison soldiers were killed. With Ming supplies coming in from the sea, Mao was able to hold the fort against Jin assaults for some time.

Mao had originally hoped that the Ming court would reinforce his position with an additional 30,000 to 50,000 troops from the sea, but when no reinforcements were forthcoming, Mao decided to pull back and retreat to Ka Island.

== Aftermath ==
When Nurhaci recaptured the fort, he torched it rather than risk having it captured again.

== Bibliography ==
- Swope, Kenneth (2014), The Military Collapse of China's Ming Dynasty, Routledge
- Wakeman, Frederic (1985), The Great Enterprise: The Manchu Reconstruction of Imperial Order in Seventeenth-Century China, vol. 1, University of California Press
