= Battle of Kaiyuan =

- Part of the Ming-Qing transition
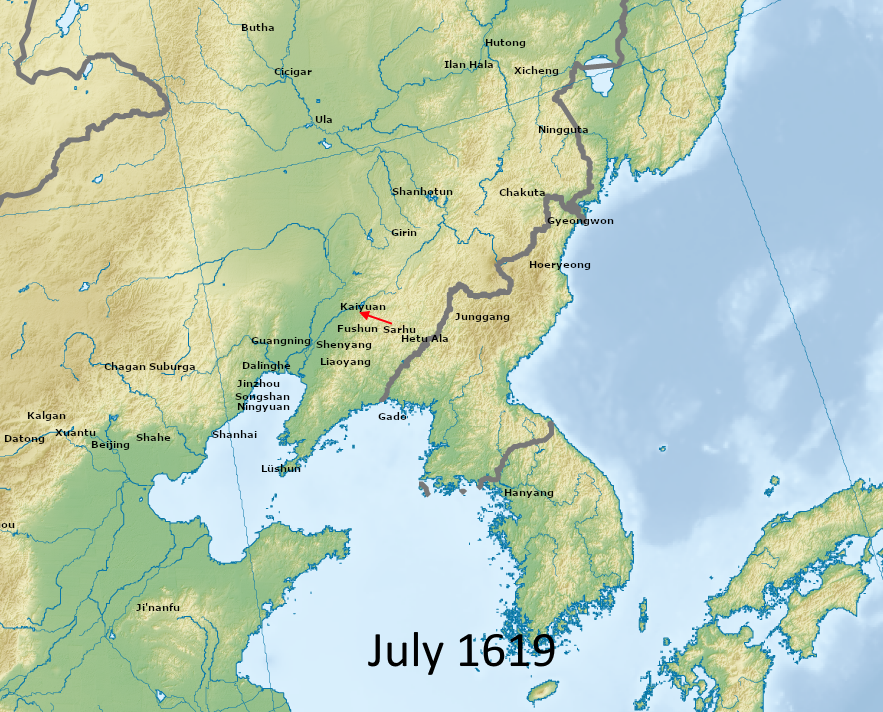
Date	July 26, 1619
Location	Kaiyuan, China
Result	Later Jin victory

Belligerents
Later Jin	Ming dynasty

Commanders and leaders
Nurhaci	Ma Lin †; Zheng Zhifan

Strength
Unknown	Unknown

Casualties and losses
Unknown	Heavy

The Battle of Kaiyuan was a conflict between the Later Jin and Ming dynasty in the summer of 1619. Following the victory at the Battle of Sarhu, Nurhaci continued the attack on Ming by assaulting the city of Kaiyuan.

The Jin attack occurred during a heavy downpour. Ming dispatched a small relief contingent of 100 men, but they were intercepted by a Jin force and suffered 32 casualties. The Jin army besieged Kaiyuan and attacked Ma Lin's outer defenses, which had been heavily strengthened in preference to a safer position on the walls. However the strategy ended badly for Ma Lin, whose forces were defeated. As too many men were already outside, there were not enough men to man the walls. As imminent defeat became apparent, the Censor Zheng Zhifan fled.

The walls were breached and the fighting continued inside the city for three days before it was pacified. Meanwhile, another relief contingent had been dispatched from Tieling, but was also intercepted by a Jin force and repulsed.

Ma Lin was captured and executed.

== Bibliography ==
- Swope, Kenneth (2014), The Military Collapse of China's Ming Dynasty, Routledge
- Wakeman, Frederic (1985), The Great Enterprise: The Manchu Reconstruction of Imperial Order in Seventeenth-Century China, vol. 1, University of California Press
