= Laimbu =

- Duke Who Assists the Nation (輔國公)
- Born: 26 January 1612
- Died: 23 June 1646 (aged 34)
- Issue: Laihu
Names
- Aisin Gioro Laimbu (愛新覺羅·賴慕布)
Posthumous name
- Duke Jiezhi Who Assists the Nation (輔國介直公)
- House: Aisin Gioro
- Father: Nurhaci
- Mother: Lady Sirin Gioro

Laimbu

Chinese name
- Traditional Chinese: 賴慕布
- Simplified Chinese: 赖慕布
Transcriptions
Standard Mandarin
- Hanyu Pinyin: Làimùbù

Manchu script name
- Manchu script: ᠯᠠᡳᠮᠪᡠ

Transcription name
- Transcription: laimbu

Laimbu (Manchu: ᠯᠠᡳᠮᠪᡠ, Möllendorff: laimbu, Abkai: laimbu; 26 January 1612 – 23 June 1646) was a Manchu noble of the early Qing Dynasty.

== Biography ==
Laimbu was born of the Manchu Aisin Gioro clan as the 13th son of Nurhaci, founder of the Qing Dynasty. His mother was Lady Sirin Gioro (西林覺羅氏), a concubine of Nurhaci. He was a younger half-brother of Nurhaci's successor Hong Taiji.

In 1634, during Hong Taiji's reign, Laimbu was appointed as niru-jianggin (牛錄章京) and in 1639 he was given a position in the Deliberative Council of Princes and Ministers. In 1642 he followed his older half-brother Ajige to attack the Ming Dynasty and defeated a Ming army at Ningyuan. Ajige returned to his residence without waiting for an announcement of the rewards granted to him by Hong Taiji in recognition of his contributions. This was seen as showing disrespect towards the emperor. Laimbu was also found guilty because he did not stop Ajige, and was stripped of his position in the council.

In 1645 Laimbu was granted the title of "General Who Receives Grace" (奉恩將軍). He died in 1646 and his title was inherited by his son Laihu (來祜). In 1653, during the reign of the Shunzhi Emperor, Laimbu was conferred a posthumous title of "Duke Jiezhi Who Assists the Nation" (輔國介直公). The ducal title "Duke Who Assists the Nation" (輔國公) was then passed on to Laimbu's son Laihu.

== Family ==
Primary Consort

- Primary consort, of the Nara clan
  - Laihu, Duke of the Second Rank (輔國公 來祜; 1625–1694), first son

Concubine

- Mistress, of the Fuca clan
- Mistress, of the Khorchin Borjigin clan
- Mistress of the Yang clan

== Ancestry ==
Fuman
Giocangga (1526–1583)
Empress Zhi
Taksi (1543–1583)
Empress Yi
Nurhaci (1559–1626)
Cancha
Agu
Empress Xuan (d. 1569)
Laimbu (1612–1646)
Lady Sirin Gioro

== See also ==
- Qing Dynasty nobility
- Ranks of Imperial Consorts in China#Qing
