= Hetu Ala =

Former capital of Later Jin; renamed to Xing Jing in 1636 by Hong Taiji

Coordinates: 41°42′07″N 124°51′29″E

Hetu Ala (Chinese: 赫圖阿拉城; Manchu:ᡥᡝᡨᡠ
ᠠᠯᠠ) was the first capital city of the Jurchen-led Later Jin dynasty of China. It was the capital from 1616 to 1622. It was renamed to Xingjing (Chinese: 興京) in 1634.

The site of Hetu Ala is located in Xinbin Manchu Autonomous County, Liaoning, along the Suzi River, a tributary of the Hun River.

== History ==
Hetu Ala was the place of residence of Giocangga, a Jurchen chieftain and the grandfather of Nurhaci. In 1603, Nurhaci ordered the construction of a city at Hetu Ala and used it as his base of power. In 1616, Nurhaci proclaimed himself khan in the Octagonal Hall at Hetu Ala, founding the state of Later Jin. In 1621, the "Eastern Capital" was constructed near the city of Liaoyang as the new Jin capital. In 1624, the tombs of Nurhaci's family and ancestors were moved to the Eastern Capital. However, Giocangga and Taksi, Nurhaci's father, were brought back to Hetu Ala in 1658.

In 1634, the city's name was changed to Xingjing.

== Layout ==
Hetu Ala was located on the southern bank of the Suzi River. The city had two walls. The inner wall was built of wood and stone and had a perimeter of five li (2.5 kilometres (1.6 mi)). The outer wall had a perimeter of ten li (5 kilometres (3.1 mi)) and had nine gates.

The Yong Mausoleum for Giocangga and Taksi was located to the west of the city, near the present Yongling town (永陵镇).
