= Nurhaci =

Founding khan of the Later Jin dynasty

Nurhaci 努爾哈赤
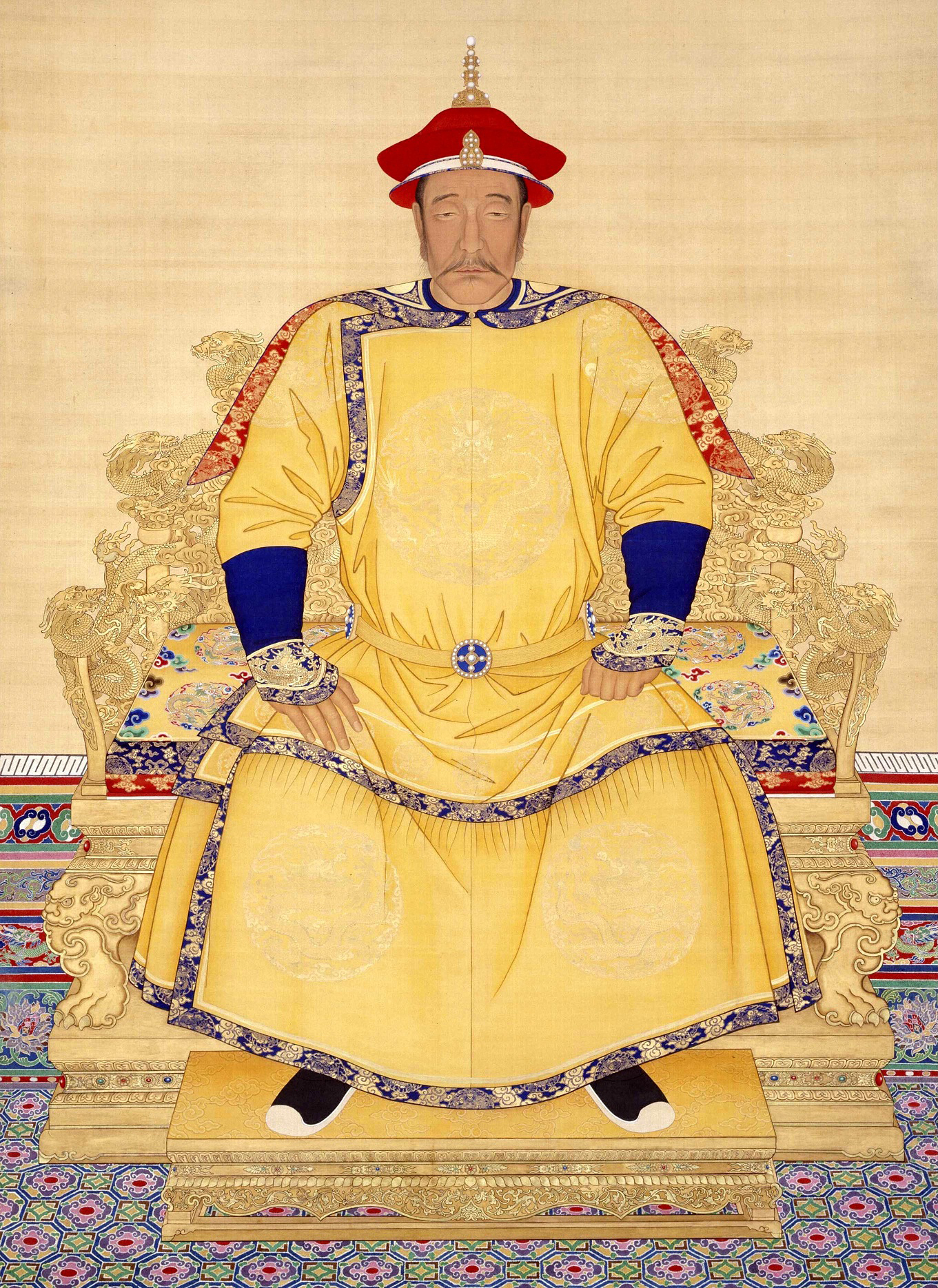
- 17th century state portrait, currently in the collection of the Palace Museum

Khan of the Jin dynasty
- Reign: 17 February 1616 – 30 September 1626 (10 years, 225 days)
- Successor: Hong Taiji
- Born: 14 May 1559; Hetu Ala, Manchuria (in present-day Xinbin Manchu Autonomous County)
- Died: 30 September 1626 (aged 67); Aiji Fort (in present-day Liaoning)
- Burial: Fu Mausoleum
- Consorts: Consort Yuan (m. 1577; died 1592) Consort Ji (m. 1585; died 1620) Empress Xiaocigao (m. 1588; died 1603) Empress Xiaoliewu (m. 1601)
- Issue Detail: Cuyen, Prince Guanglüe of the Third Rank; Daišan, Prince Lilie of the First Rank; Manggūltai, Prince of the Third Rank; Abatai, Prince Raoyumin of the First Rank; Hong Taiji; Ajige, Prince Ying of the First Rank; Laimbu, Duke Jiezhi of the Second Rank; Dorgon, Prince Ruizhong of the First Rank; Dodo, Prince Yutong of the First Rank
Names
- Nurhaci (努爾哈齊); Manchu: Nurgaci (ᠨᡠᡵᡤᠠᠴᡳ)
Era dates
- Tianming (天命): 14 May 1616 – 15 February 1627; Manchu: Abkai fulingga (ᠠᠪᡴᠠᡳ ᡶᡠᠯᡳᠩᡤᠠ); Mongolian: Тэнгэрийн сүлдэт (ᠲᠩᠷᠢ ᠶᠢᠨ ᠰᠦᠯᠳᠡᠲᠦ)
Regnal name
- Emperor Fuyu Lieguo Yingming (覆育列國英明皇帝)
Posthumous name
- Emperor Chengtian Guangyun Shengde Shengong Zhaoji Liji Renxiao Ruiwu Duanyi Qin'an Hongwen Dingye Gao (承天廣運聖德神功肇紀立極仁孝睿武端毅欽安弘文定業高皇帝); Manchu: Abkai Hese be Alifi, Forgon be Mukdembuhe, Gurun -i Ten be Fukjin Ilibuha, Ferguwecuke Gungge, Gosin Hiyoošungga, Horonggo Enduringge, Šu be Iletulehe, Doro be Toktobuha, Genggiyen Erdemungge Dergi Hūwangdi (ᠠᠪᡴᠠᡳ ᡥᡝᠰᡝ ᠪᡝ ᠠᠯᡳᡶᡳ᠈ ᡶᠣᡵᡤᠣᠨ ᠪᡝ ᠮᡠᡴᡩᡝᠮᠪᡠᡥᡝ᠈ ᡤᡠᡵᡠᠨ ᡳ ᡨᡝᠨ ᠪᡝ ᡶᡠᡴᠵᡳᠨ ᡳᠯᡳᠪᡠᡥᠠ᠈ ᡶᡝᡵᡤᡠᠸᡝᠴᡠᡴᡝ ᡤᡠᠩᡤᡝ᠈ ᡤᠣᠰᡳᠨ ᡥᡳᠶᠣᠣᡧᡠᠩᡤᠠ᠈ ᡥᠣᡵᠣᠩᡤᠣ ᡝᠨᡩᡠᡵᡳᠩᡤᡝ᠈ ᡧᡠ ᠪᡝ ᡳᠯᡝᡨᡠᠯᡝᡥᡝ᠈ ᡩᠣᡵᠣ ᠪᡝ ᡨᠣᡴᡨᠣᠪᡠᡥᠠ᠈ ᡤᡝᠩᡤᡳᠶᡝᠨ ᡝᡵᡩᡝᠮᡠᠩᡤᡝ ᡩᡝᡵᡤᡳ ᡥᡡᠸᠠᠩᡩᡳ)
Temple name
- Taizu (太祖); Manchu: Taidzu (ᡨᠠᡳᡯᡠ)
- House: Aisin Gioro
- Dynasty: Later Jin
- Father: Taksi

Nurhaci (14 May 1559 – 30 September 1626), also known by his temple name Emperor Taizu of Qing, was the founding khan of the Jurchen-led Later Jin dynasty.

As leader of the Aisin Gioro clan, Nurhaci reorganized and united various Jurchen tribes (the later Manchu), consolidated the Eight Banners military system, and eventually launched attacks on both the Ming and Joseon dynasties. His conquest of the Ming dynasty's northeastern Liaodong region laid the groundwork for the Qing conquest of the Ming by his descendants, who proclaimed the Qing dynasty in 1636. He is also generally credited with ordering the creation of a new written script for the Manchu language based on the Mongolian vertical script.

== Name and titles ==
Nurhaci is written as ᠨᡠᡵᡤᠠᠴᡳ in the Manchu language. Some suggest that the meaning of the name in the Manchu language is "the skin of a wild boar". Another explanation is "brave person like a wild boar". Regarded as the founding father of the Qing dynasty, he is given the customary temple name of Taizu, which is traditionally assigned to founders of dynasties. His name is also alternatively spelled Nurgaci, Nurhachi, or Nu-er-ha-chi (the last of these simply the transcription of the Chinese characters used to write his name).

Nurhaci was the last chieftain of the Jianzhou Jurchens and first khan of the Later Jin dynasty. His title in Manchu as khan was ᡤᡝᡵᡝᠨ
ᡤᡠᡵᡠᠨ ᠪᡝ
ᡠᠵᡳᡵᡝ
ᡤᡝᠩᡤᡳᠶᡝᠨ
ᡥᠠᠨ Geren gurun-be ujire genggiyen han ("brilliant khan who benefits all nations"). His era name was Tianming (Chinese: 天命; pinyin: Tiānmíng; Manchu:ᠠᠪᡴᠠᡳ
ᡶᡠᠯᡳᠩᡤᠠ Abkai Fulingga), in Mongolian Тэнгэрийн сүлдэт ᠲᠩᠷᠢ ᠶᠢᠨ
ᠰᠦᠯᠳᠡᠲᠦ Tengri-yin süldetü. It means "Heaven's Mandate." He was given a posthumous name in 1736 (see infobox), the shortened form of which was "Emperor Gao" (Chinese: 高皇帝; pinyin: Gāo huángdì, Manchu: ᡩᡝᡵᡤᡳ
ᡥᡡᠸᠠᠩᡩᡳ Dergi Hūwangdi).

== Early life ==
Nurhaci was born in 1559. Being a member of the Gioro clan of the Suksuhu River tribe, Nurhaci also claimed descent from Mentemu, a Jurchen headman who lived some two centuries earlier. The young man grew up as a soldier in the household of the Ming dynasty general Li Chengliang in Fushun, where he learned Mandarin Chinese, the official language of the courts. Nurhaci read the Chinese novels Romance of the Three Kingdoms and Water Margin, learning all he knew about Chinese military and political strategies from them. He named his clan Aisin Gioro around 1612, when he formally ascended the throne as the Khan of the Later Jin dynasty.

Nurhaci's grandfather Giocangga was a chieftain of the Jurchens in Hetu Ala who enjoyed the patronage of Li. He frequented the Fushun market as official delegation leader, and accompanied Li to Beijing at least once. In 1582, Nikan Wailan, a rival Jurchen chief, led Ming forces to attack the Fort Gure (古勒城, now in Xinbin County). Giocangga feared for his granddaughter who was married to Atai, the town's chief. He rushed into the city, taking Nurhaci's father Taksi with him. During the ensuing battle, both Giocangga and Taksi were killed.

Nurhaci sought revenge against Nikan Wailan for the deaths of his father and grandfather. The Ming returned his father's remains, granted him trade patents, and recognized him as the successor of Giocangga. However, Nurhaci's demand that they hand over Nikan Wailan was refused. Nurhaci therefore started to expand his own power, starting only from thirteen sets of armor inherited from his father. In 1584, he attacked Nikan Wailan at Turun. Nikan Wailan fled away to Erhun, which Nurhaci attacked again in 1587. Nikan Wailan this time fled to Li Chengliang's territory. Li relented and gave Nikan Wailan over to Nurhaci, who beheaded Nikan Wailan immediately.

Nurhaci gradually grew his strength in the following years and subdued the core Jianzhou Jurchen tribes and towns from 1583 to 1588. At the same time, Nurhaci still considered himself a guardian of the Ming border and a local representative of imperial Ming power. He received the title of assistant commissioner-in chief in 1589 and the honor of "dragon-tiger general" in 1595. He consolidated his relationship with the Ming by personally leading multiple tributary missions to Beijing from 1590 onward, and was seen in by the Ming a loyal subject. His aggressive tactics against other Jurchen tribes were fueled by the high status that the Ming had given him.

== Unifying the Jurchen tribes ==
In 1593, the Yehe called upon a coalition of nine tribes (the Hada, Ula, Hoifa, Khorchin Mongols, Sibe, Guwalca, Jušeri, Neyen, and the Yehe themselves) to attack the Jianzhou Jurchens. The coalition was defeated at the Battle of Gure and Nurhaci emerged victorious.

From 1599 to 1618, Nurhaci set out on a campaign against the four Hulun tribes. He began by attacking the Hada in 1599 and conquering them in 1603. Then in 1607, Hoifa was also conquered with the death of its beile Baindari, followed by an expedition against Ula and its beile Bujantai in 1613, and finally the Yehe and its beile Gintaisi at the Battle of Sarhu in 1619. As Nurhaci's power expanded, the relationship with the Ming also became increasingly strained. In 1608, Ming subjects were prohibited from cultivating the land or gathering ginseng, one of the main Jurchen export products, within Nurhaci's boundary.

In 1599, Nurhaci gave two of his translators, Erdeni Baksi ('Jewel Teacher' in Mongolian) and G'ag'ai Jargūci, the task of creating a Manchu alphabet by adapting the Mongolian script. Dahai was described with his origin from the Liao valley and his ethnicity as Han Chinese in the Korean book "Nanjung chamnok; Sok chamnok" (亂中雜錄) by Cho Kyŏng-nam (趙慶南) (1570–1641), a Korean official and scholar, contradicting Qing texts which says his clan is Giolca. The Qing texts said Dahau's family lived near Fushun in the Giolca region.

In 1606, he was granted the title of Kundulun Khan by the Mongols.

"Seal of the Tianming Khan of Jin" (Manchu: ᠠᠪᡴᠠᡳ ᡶᡠᠯᡳᠩᡤᠠ ᠠᡳᠰᡳᠨ ᡤᡠᡵᡠᠨ ᡥᠠᠨ ᡳ ᡩᠣᡵᠣᠨ abkai fulingga aisin gurun han i doron), used by Nurhaci as Khan of the Later Jin.

In 1616, Nurhaci declared himself Khan and founded the Jin dynasty (aisin gurun), often called the Later Jin in reference to the legacy of the earlier Jurchen Jin dynasty of the 12th century. The "Later Jin" was renamed to "Qing" by his son Hong Taiji after his death in 1626, however Nurhaci is usually referred to as the founder of the Qing dynasty.

In order to help with the newly organized administration, five of his trusted companions were appointed as his chief councilors, Anfiyanggū, Eidu, Hūrhan, Fiongdon, and Hohori.

Only after he became Khan did he finally unify the Ula (clan of his consort Lady Abahai, mentioned below) and the Yehe, the clan of his consort Monggo Jerjer.

Nurhaci chose to variously emphasize either differences or similarities in lifestyles with other peoples like the Mongols for political reasons. Nurhaci said to the Mongols that "The languages of the Chinese and Koreans are different, but their clothing and way of life is the same. It is the same with us Manchus (Jusˇen)) and Mongols. Our languages are different, but our clothing and way of life is the same." Four months later when the Mongols invaded recently conquered Jianzhou territory, Nurhaci indicated that the bond with the Mongols was not based in any real shared culture, rather it was for pragmatic reasons of "mutual opportunism": ""Why do you Mongols take the grain, people, horses, oxen and everything from the Yehe? Did you Mongols help us destroy their towns? Did you help work their fields? You Mongols raise livestock, eat meat and wear pelts. My people till the fields and live on grain. We two are not one country and we have different languages".

When the Jurchens were reorganized by Nurhaci into the Eight Banners, many Manchu clans were artificially created as a group of unrelated people founded a new Manchu clan (mukun) using a geographic origin name such as a toponym for their hala (clan name). The irregularities over Jurchen and Manchu clan origin led to the Qing trying to document and systematize the creation of histories for Manchu clans, including manufacturing an entire legend around the origin of the Aisin Gioro clan by taking mythology from the northeast.

== Invasion of Ming dynasty ==
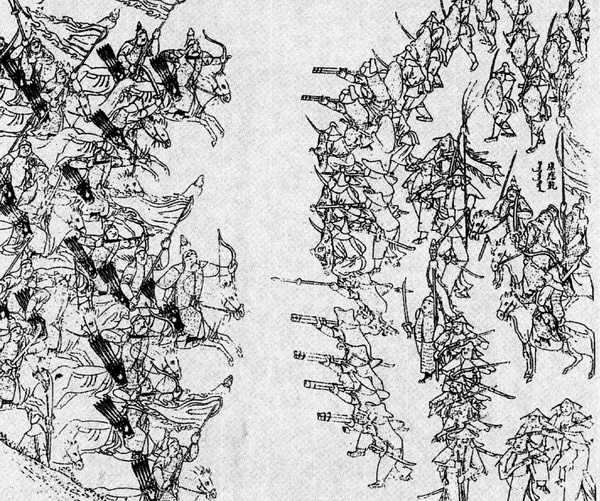
At the Battle of Sarhu Nurhaci defeated a four-pronged Chinese offensive intended to capture his capital of Hetu Ala by concentrating his forces in one column at a time.

In 1618, Nurhaci commissioned a document titled the Seven Grievances in which he enumerated seven problems with Ming rule and began to rebel against the domination of the Ming dynasty. A majority of the grievances dealt with conflicts against Yehe, and Ming favouritism of Yehe.

Nurhaci battled against the Ming dynasty. During the battle of Fushun, the army of Nurhaci assailed the city walls with siege ladders and the unprepared garrison gave their lives in a hasty defense. Li Yongfang and his lieutenant, Zhao Yipeng, decided to surrender on the condition that no one was to be harmed. Nurhaci agreed to the terms and entered the city. Li was made a commander in the Nurhaci's army and granted a granddaughter of Nurhaci as his concubine for his role in minimizing losses for Nurhaci. Nurhaci left 4,000 men to hold Fushun while he took the remaining army to capture two nearby fortresses, which fell in quick succession. Meanwhile, news of the loss of Fushun had reached Ming on the 12th and a relief contingent of 10,000 under Zhang Chengyin was dispatched to retake the city. The Ming army arrived on the 15th and immediately set up three camps, dug trenches, and began bombarding the city with cannon fire. However Nurhaci's sons Hong Taiji and Daišan sallied forth and routed the Ming forces, dealing heavy casualties. Defectors from the Ming side played a massive role in the Qing conquest of the Ming. Ming generals who defected to the Manchus were often married to women from the Aisin Gioro clan while lower-ranked defectors were given non-imperial Manchu women as wives. Nurhaci arranged for a marriage between one of his granddaughters and the Ming general Li Yongfang (李永芳) after Li surrendered Fushun in Liaoning to the Manchus in 1618 as the result of the Battle of Fushun. His son Abatai's daughter was married to Li Yongfang. The offspring of Li received the "Third Class Viscount" (三等子爵; sān děng zǐjué) title. Li Yongfang was the great-great-great-grandfather of Li Shiyao (李侍堯).

In the battle of Qinghe, Three army of Nurhaci completely annihilates the 6,400 Ming army.

During the battle of Sarhū, Nurhaci had 50–60,000 soldiers at his disposal, but unlike the Chinese, he did not divide them. Instead, he used his knowledge of the terrain, weather, and mobility to his advantage and crushed the individual Ming corps one by one. First, he defeated Du Song's corps on 14 April, followed by Ma Lin's the next day. Yang Hao, in response, ordered a retreat, and while Li Rubai attempted to retreat as well, the order did not reach Liu Ting and his corps, resulting in their defeat on 20 April. Du and Liu both fell in battle. After defeating the Ming, Nurhaci joined forces with the remaining Jurchens and occupied Kaiyuan, where he killed Ma Lin, and Tieling in northern Liaodong. As a result of the defeat, Li Rubai was accused of cowardice and committed suicide under the weight of criticism, while Yang Hao was imprisoned and executed in 1629.

At the battle of Kaiyuan, Nurhaci breached the wall of the city and fought the Ming defenders for three days. Meanwhile, another relief contingent had been dispatched from Tieling, but was also intercepted by a detachment of Nurhaci's army and repulsed. Nurhaci continues his campaign subduing Tieling in the summer of 1619. In the fall season, Nurhaci invaded Xicheng, the home of the Yehe Jurchens who allied with Ming. Nurhaci personally led the vanguard and took the east wall. After capturing the city the Yehe inhabitants were spared, but their Ming allies who had fought beside them were executed.

After taking the city of Xicheng from his last Jurchen rivals, the Yihe clan, Nurhaci and his advisers started planning the conquest of Shenyang to make it the new capital of |Later Jin]. In early 1621 the Jin attacked the Liaodong region and took the fortress of Fengjibao near Shenyang. Nurhaci attacked with all Eight Banners. For the first two days, The battle ended in complete defeat for Li and the Jin took Fengjibao. Meanwhile, a Ming army of 50,000 had been dispatched and was on its way to besiege Shenyang. News of this reached Nurhaci, who rushed his banners out to confront the Ming before they could entrench themselves around the city. The Jin cavalry caught them in a pincer attack. Next Nurhaci intercepted another army from Liaoyang and defeated it in quick succession. Seeing that Ming defenses had disintegrated, Nurhaci proceeded to invade Liaoyang, where Yuan Yingtai was headquartered. The Ming army was able to repulse Jin advances until they ran out of ammunition, after which they were routed. The victorious Nurhaci's army were reportedly entered the city greeted with joy.

In the fall of 1621 Ming general Mao Wenlong manage to capture Fort Zhenjiang on the border of the Jin-Joseon border and held it against multiple Jin assaults before retreating. Nurhaci burnt down the fort afterwards rather than risk having it captured again.

Later, he also led many successful engagements against the Northern Yuan dynasty, the Joseon dynasty, and other Jurchen clans, greatly enlarging the territory under his control.

The first capitals of the Later Jin dynasty established by Nurhaci were Fe Ala and Hetu Ala. Many ethnic Han participated in the construction of Hetu Ala.

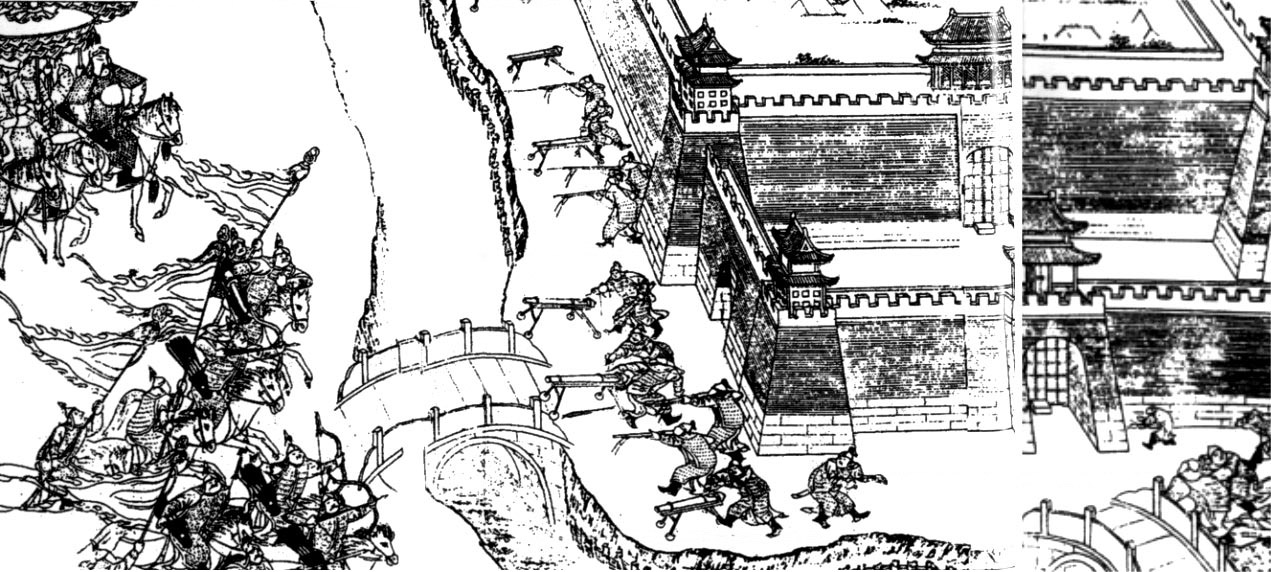
Nurhaci captured Liaoyang in 1621 and made it the capital of his empire until 1625.

The Han prisoner of war Gong Zhenglu (Onoi) was appointed to instruct Nurhaci's sons and received gifts of slaves, wives, and a domicile from Nurhaci after Nurhaci rejected offers of payment to release him back to his relatives.

Nurhaci had treated Han in Liaodong differently according to how much grain they had, those with less than 5 to 7 jin were treated poorly while those with more than that amount were rewarded with property. Due to a revolt by Han in Liaodong in 1623, Nurhachi, who previously gave concessions to conquered Han subjects in Liaodong, turned against them and ordered that they no longer be trusted and enacted discriminatory policies and killings against them, while ordering that Han who assimilated to the Jurchen (in Jilin) before 1619 be treated equally as Jurchens were and not like the conquered Han in Liaodong.

By May 1621, Nurhaci had conquered the cities of Liaoyang and Shenyang. In April 1625, he designated Shenyang the new capital city, which would hold that status until the Qing conquest of the Ming in 1644.

In 1622, Nurhaci managed to defeat the Ming forces and killed 16,000 of their soldiers at the battle of Guangning.

=== Death ===
In 1626, Nurhaci was defeated by Ming general Yuan Chonghuan at the Battle of Ningyuan, in what was the first serious military defeat of his life. During this battle, Nurhaci was wounded by Portuguese gunners using Macau manufactured cannons placed in Yuan's army. Unable to recover either physically or mentally, Nurhaci died of his wounds two days later in Aijipu (靉雞堡; present-day Da'aijinpu Village, Dijia Township, Yuhong District, Shenyang) on 30 September 1626, at the age of 67. His tomb, Fu Mausoleum (Chinese: 福陵; pinyin: Fúlíng), is located east of Shenyang.

== Relationship with Joseon Dynasty ==
After consolidating control over the various different tribes in the Jianzhou region, that bordered the Korean peninsula, Nurhaci frequently sent Jurchen men to gather ginseng. On numerous occasions, these men crossed into Joseon territory, where they would be attacked and killed by border guards. In 1595, Nurhaci threatened military action against Joseon, citing the killing of 27 Jurchens while gathering ginseng in Wiwon, Korea, as a pretext for his decision. With the Imjin War was still raging, King Seonjo of the Joseon Dynasty sought to avoid further conflict through efforts of appeasement and diplomacy. He requested for Hu Dashou, a Ming military instructor in Joseon, to dispatch his subordinate Yu Xiyuan—accompanied by Ha Saeguk, a Korean interpreter of the Jurchen language, and some other men—to deliver an imperial edict to Nurhaci, urging for peace. Later that same winter, King Seonjo also sent Shin Chung-il, a junior officer from the southern region, as an envoy to Nurhaci. Despite these efforts, cross-border conflicts continued to occur unabatedly.

Prior to these incidents, the Joseon Dynasty had maintained fraught relationships with the Jurchens. In 1592, upon learning about the outbreak of the Imjin War, Nurhaci offered to send elite troops to assist Korea in fighting the Japanese invaders despite the Ming government's strict prohibition against any unauthorized contact with Korea. The Joseon government, however, rejected that offer due to security concerns and deep-seated ethnic prejudices against the Jurchens.

Despite repeated rejection from the Joseon government, Nurhaci continued taking different measures to project power over the Korean peninsula and establish diplomatic engagement with Joseon authority, as a way to gain potential leverage for his eventual confrontation with the Ming. This diplomatic drive persisted even after Nurhaci officially launched his campaign against the Ming in 1618, where he made strenuous efforts to court the Joseon government to his side. The reigning Joseon monarch at that time, Gwanghaegun, however, pursued a policy of neutrality and declined to align either side. It was not until 1619, when the Ming ordered for the conscription of troops from Korea to help suppress Nurhaci, that King Gwanghaegun complied and dispatched General Gang Hong-rip with over ten thousand troops to assist Ming General Liu Ting in fighting the Jurchens. Soon afterwards, however, the Ming army was defeated in the Battle of Sarhū. Gang Hong-rip was forced to surrender with his remaining troops to Nurhaci, becoming a bargaining chip for the Later Jin in their negotiations with the Joseon Dynasty. Following this defeat, while King Gwanghaegun continued to maintain ties with the Ming, he ceased to send any further assistance to in the war and secretly started to engage in contact with the Later Jin.

This status quo did not last long. In 1621, the Joseon government allowed Mao Wenlong, a Ming general, to establish a military base on Ka Island. From there, he exploited the Later Jin's lack of naval warfare experience and capability to frequently harass the Jurchen forces from the rear. Suffering several loses as a result, Nurhaci demanded the Joseon government to hand over Mao Wenlong. However, the Joseon officials remained unmoved and repeatedly refused Nurhaci's various demands, prompting Nurhaci to detain and kill some Korean envoy in retaliation. Thus strained bilateral relationship and delaying any progress in negotiations on both sides . And in 1623, Gwanghaegun was overthrown in a coup and replaced by Injo. This completely severing any contact and negotiation between the Joseon Dynasty and Later Jin. Although many princes and ministers urged Nurhaci to attack the Korea peninsula, Nurhaci refused, fearing that war on two fronts would exact too great a toll. It was not until 1627, one year after Nurhaci's death, that the Later Jin launched a military compaign on the Joseon dynasty.

== Legacy ==
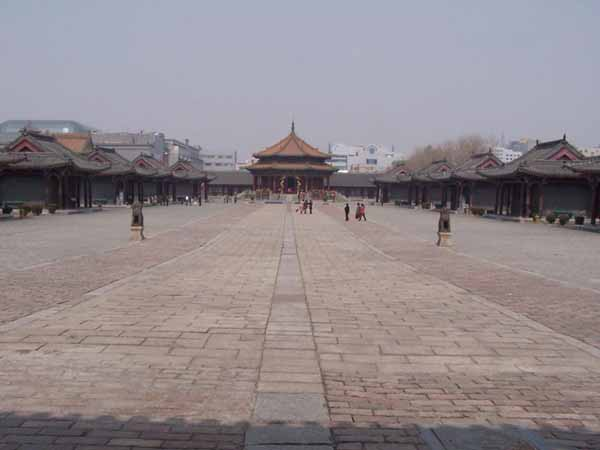
In 1621, Nurhaci started the construction of a new palace, the Mukden Palace, for his Later Jin dynasty's capital of Mukden (now Shenyang).

Among the most lasting contributions Nurhaci left his descendants was the establishment of the Eight Banners, which would eventually form the backbone of the military that dominated the Qing Empire. The status of Banners did not change much over the course of Nurhaci's lifetime, nor in subsequent reigns, remaining mostly under the control of the royal family. The two elite Yellow Banners were consistently under Nurhaci's control. The Plain Blue Banner was controlled by Nurhaci's brother Šurhaci until he was charged with treason and died, at which point the Bordered Blue Banner was given to Šurhaci's eldest son, Amin first and then when he fell out of favor, it transferred to his younger brother Jirgalang. The Plain Blue Banner was awarded to Nurhaci's fifth son, Manggūltai. Nurhaci's eldest son, Cuyen, controlled the White Banner for most of his father's reign until he rebelled. Then the Bordered White Banner was given to Nurhaci's grandson, Dudu (Cuyen's eldest son) and the Plain White was given to his eighth son and heir, Hong Taiji. However, by the end of Nurhaci's reign, Hong Taiji controlled both White Banners. Finally, the Red Banner and Bordered Red Banner was both run by Nurhaci's second son Daišan at first. Later in Nurhaci's reign, the Bordered Red Banner was handed down to Daisan's son, Yoto, which on the surface was seen as a reward for the next generation to shine, but in reality to decrease the power and influence of Daisan to hold just one banner instead of two as Nurhaci wanted the eight banner chiefs to hold political authority evenly after his death. Daišan and his son would continue holding the two Red Banners well into the end of Hong Taiji's reign.

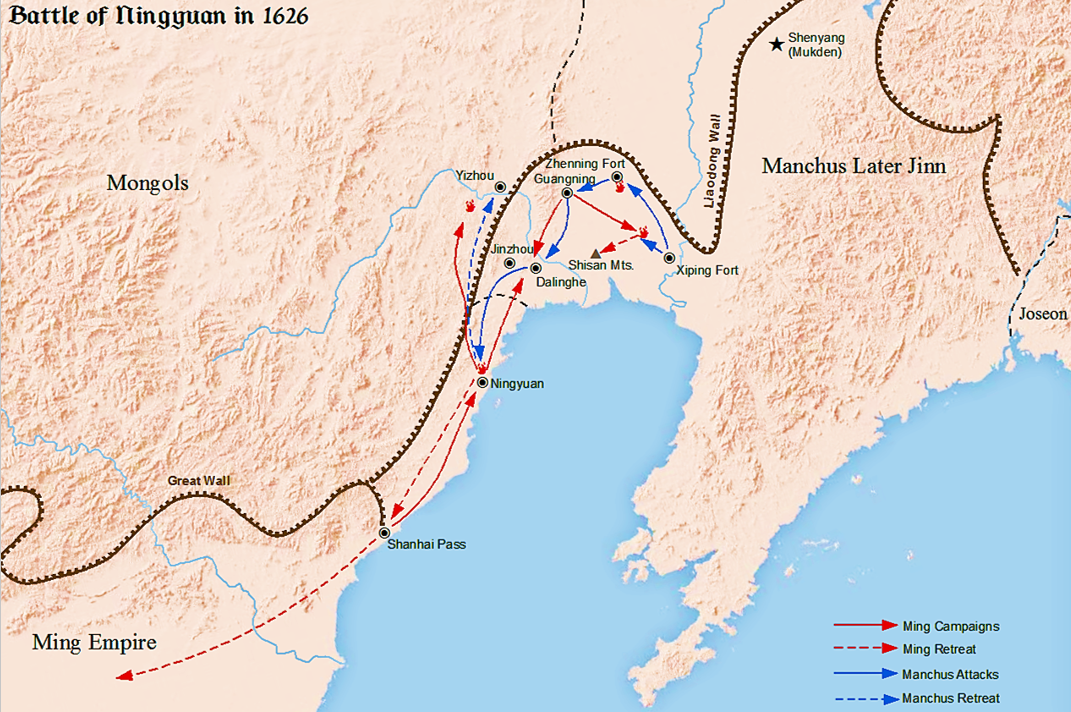
Battle of Ningyuan in which Nurhaci was wounded and died

The details of Hong Taiji's succession as the Khan of the Later Jin dynasty are unclear. When he died in late 1626, Nurhaci did not designate an heir; instead he encouraged his sons to rule collegially. Three of his sons and a nephew were the "four senior beiles": Daišan (43 years old), Amin (son of Nurhaci's brother Šurhaci; 40 or 41), Manggūltai (38 or 39), and Hong Taiji himself (33). On the day after Nurhaci's death, they coerced his primary consort Lady Abahai (1590–1626) – who had borne him three sons: Ajige, Dorgon, and Dodo – to commit suicide to accompany him in death. This gesture has made some historians suspect that Nurhaci had in fact named the fifteen-year-old Dorgon as a successor, with Daišan as regent. By forcing Dorgon's mother to kill herself, the princes removed a strong base of support for Dorgon. The reason such intrigue was necessary is that Nurhaci had left the two elite Yellow Banners to Dorgon and Dodo, who were the sons of Lady Abahai. Hong Taiji exchanged control of his two White Banners for that of the two Yellow Banners, shifting their influence and power from his young brothers onto himself.

According to Hong Taiji's later recollections, Amin and the other beile were willing to accept Hong Taiji as Khan, but Amin then would have wanted to leave with his Bordered Blue Banner, threatening to dissolve Nurhaci's unification of the Jurchens. Eventually the older Daišan worked out a compromise that allowed Hong Taiji as the Khan, but almost equal to the other three senior beiles. Hong Taiji would eventually find ways to become the undisputed leader.

The change of the name from Jurchen to Manchu by Hong Taiji was made to hide the fact that the ancestors of the Manchus, the Jianzhou Jurchens, were ruled by the Chinese. The Qing dynasty carefully hid the two original editions of the books of "Qing Taizu Wu Huangdi Shilu" and the "Manzhou Shilu Tu" (Taizu Shihlu Tu) in the Qing palace, forbidden from public view because they showed that the Manchu Aisin Gioro family had been ruled by the Ming dynasty. In the Ming period, the Koreans of Joseon referred to the Jurchen-inhabited lands north of the Korean peninsula, above the rivers Yalu and Tumen, as part of Ming China, which they called the "superior country" (sangguk).

== Translations of Chinese texts ==
The first Manchu translations of Chinese works were the Six Secret Teachings (六韜), Sushu 素書, and Three Strategies of Huang Shigong (三略), all Chinese military texts dedicated to the arts of war due to the Manchu interests in the topic, like Sun-Tzu's work The Art of War. The military related texts which were translated into Manchu from Chinese were translated by Dahai.

Manchu translations of Chinese texts included the Ming penal code and military texts were performed by Dahai. These translations were requested of Dahai by Nurhaci. The military text Wuzi was translated into Manchu along with The Art of War.

Chinese history, Chinese law, and Chinese military theory classical texts were translated into Manchu during the rule of Hong Taiji in Mukden (now Shenyang), with the Manchus placing significance upon military and governance related Chinese texts. A Manchu translation was made of the military-themed novel Romance of the Three Kingdoms. Chinese literature, military theory and legal texts were translated into Manchu by Dahai and Erdeni. The translations were ordered in 1629.

The translation of the military texts Sushu and Three Strategies of Huang Shigong, and the Da Ming Huidian (大明會典) done by Dahai was ordered by Nurhaci. While it was mainly administrative and ethical guidance which made up most of the Three Strategies of Huang Shigong and the Sushu, military science was indeed found in the Six Secret Teachings and Chinese military manuals were eagerly translated by the Manchus. They were also attracted to the military content in Romance of the Three Kingdoms, which is why it was translated. The Art of War was translated into Manchu as ᠴᠣᠣᡥᠠᡳ
ᠪᠠᡳᡨᠠ
ᠪᡝ
ᡤᡳᠰᡠᡵᡝᠩᡤᡝ Abkai: qoohai baita be gisurengge, Möllendorff: coohai baita be gisurengge, Discourse on the art of War. Another later Manchu translation was made by Aisin Gioro Qiying.

== Primary sources ==
Information concerning Nurhaci can be found in later, propagandistic works such as the Manchu Veritable Records (Chinese: 滿洲實錄; pinyin: Mǎnzhōu Shílù; Manchu:ᠮᠠᠨᠵᡠ ᡳ
ᠶᠠᡵᡤᡳᠶᠠᠨ
ᡴᠣᠣᠯᡳ, Möllendorff: manju-i yargiyan kooli). Good contemporary sources are also available. For instance, much material concerning Nurhaci's rise is preserved within Korean sources such as the Veritable Records of the Joseon Dynasty (Chinese: 朝鮮王朝實錄), especially the Seonjo Sillok and the Gwanghaegun Ilgi. Indeed, the record of Sin Chung-il's trip to Jianzhou is preserved in the Seonjo Sillok.

The Jiu Manzhou Dang from Nurhaci's reign also survives. A revised transcription of these records (with the dots and circles added to the script) was commissioned by the Qianlong Emperor. This has been translated into Japanese under the title Manbun roto, and Chinese, under the title Manwen Laodang (Chinese: 满文老檔). A project is or was (as of 2006) under way at Harvard University to translate them into English, as The Old Manchu Chronicles.

== Physical appearance ==
According to the account of Korean ambassadors, Nurhaci was a physically strong man with a long and stern-looking face and a big, straight nose. Like most of the other Manchu men, he shaved most of his facial hair and kept only his moustache.

== Family ==
- Consort Yuan (元妃), of the Tunggiya clan (佟佳氏; 1560–1592), personal name Hahana Jacing (哈哈納扎青)
  - Nenzhe (嫩哲), Princess Duanzhuang of the First Rank (端莊固倫公主; 8 April 1578 – August/September 1652), first daughter
    - Married Hohori (何和禮; 1561–1624), of the Donggo clan, in 1588, and had issue (two sons)
  - Cuyen (褚英), Prince Guanglüe of the Third Rank (廣略貝勒; 1580 – 14 October 1615), first son
  - Daišan (代善), Prince Lilie of the First Rank (禮烈親王; 19 August 1583 – 25 November 1648), second son
- Consort Ji (继妃), of the Fuca clan (富察氏; d. 1620), personal name Gundei (袞代)
  - Manggūltai (莽古爾泰), Prince of the Third Rank (貝勒; 1587 – 11 January 1633), fifth son
  - Mangguji (莽古濟; 1590 – January/February 1636), third daughter
    - Married Urgūdai (吳爾古代), of the Hada Nara clan, in February/March 1601
    - Married Sodnom Dügüreng (索諾木杜棱; d. 1644), of the Aohan Borjigin clan, in 1627
  - Degelei (德格類), Prince of the Third Rank (貝勒; 10 January 1597 – 11 November 1635), 10th son
- Empress Xiaocigao (孝慈高皇后), of the Yehe Nara clan (葉赫那拉氏; 1575 – 31 October 1603), personal name Monggo Jerjer (孟古哲哲)
  - Hong Taiji (皇太極), Emperor Taizong of Qing (清太宗; 28 November 1592 – 21 September 1643), eighth son
- Empress Xiaoliewu (孝烈武皇后), of the Ula Nara clan (烏拉那拉氏; 1590 – 1 October 1626), personal name Abahai (阿巴亥)
  - Ajige (阿濟格), Prince Ying of the First Rank (英親王; 28 August 1605 – 28 November 1651), 12th son
  - Dorgon (多爾袞), Prince Ruizhong of the First Rank (睿忠親王; 17 November 1612 – 31 December 1650), 14th son
  - Dodo (多鐸), Prince Yutong of the First Rank (豫通親王; 2 April 1614 – 29 April 1649), 15th son
- Consort Shoukang (壽康妃), of the Khorchin Borjigin clan (博爾濟吉特氏; 1599 – 21 January 1666)
- Secondary Consort (側妃), of the Hada Nara clan (哈達那拉氏), personal name Amin Jerjer (阿敏哲哲)
- Secondary Consort (側妃), of the Irgen Gioro clan (伊爾根覺羅氏)
  - Yanzhe (顏哲), Princess of the Second Rank (和碩公主; 1587 – August/September 1646), second daughter
    - Married Yilaka (伊拉喀)
    - Married Darhan (達爾漢; 1590–1644), of the Gorolo clan
  - Abatai (阿巴泰), Prince Raoyumin of the First Rank (饒余敏親王; 27 July 1589 – 10 May 1646), seventh son
- Secondary Consort (側妃), of the Yehe Nara clan (葉赫那拉氏), personal name Nanakun (納納昆)
  - Songgutu (松古圖), Princess of the Second Rank (和碩公主; 28 December 1612 – March/April 1646), eighth daughter
    - Married Gürbüshi (古爾布什; d. 1661), of the Khalkha Borjigin clan, on 22 February 1625
- Secondary Consort (側妃), of the Khorchin Borjigin clan (博爾濟吉特氏; d. March/April 1644)
- Mistress (格格), of the Joogiya clan (兆佳氏)
  - Abai (阿拜), Duke Qinmin of the First Rank (鎮國勤敏公; 8 September 1585 – 14 March 1648), third son
- Mistress (格格), of the Niohuru clan (鈕祜祿氏)
  - Tanggūdai (湯古代), General Kejie of the First Rank (鎮國克潔將軍; 24 December 1585 – 3 November 1640), fourth son
  - Tabai (塔拜), Duke Quehou of the Second Rank (輔國愨厚公; 2 April 1589 – 6 September 1639), sixth son
- Mistress (格格), of the Giyamuhut-Gioro clan (嘉穆瑚覺羅氏), personal name Zhenge (真哥)
  - Babutai (巴布泰), Duke Kexi of the First Rank (鎮國恪僖公; 13 December 1592 – 27 February 1655), ninth son
  - Mukushen (穆庫什), Princess of the Second Rank (和碩公主; 1595 – June/July 1659), fourth daughter
    - Married Bujantai (布佔泰; d. 1618), of the Ula Nara clan, in 1608, and had issue (three sons)
    - Married Eidu (額亦都; 1562–1622), of the Niohuru clan, and had issue (two sons, one daughter)
    - Married Turgei (圖爾格; 1594–1645), of the Niohuru clan
  - Babuhai (巴布海), General of the First Rank (鎮國將軍; 15 January 1597 – September/October 1643), 11th son
  - Fifth daughter (1597–1613)
    - Married Daki (達啟), of the Niohuru clan, in 1608
  - Sixth daughter (1600 – October/November 1646)
    - Married Suna (蘇納; d. 1648), of the Yehe Nara clan, in 1613, and had issue (one son)
- Mistress (格格), of the Irgen Gioro clan (伊爾根覺羅氏)
  - Lady of the Third Rank (鄉君; 8 April 1604 – July/August 1685), seventh daughter
    - Married Ezhayi (鄂札伊; d. 1641), of the Nara clan, in November/December 1619
- Mistress (格格), of the Sirin-Gioro clan (西林覺羅氏)
  - Laimbu (賴慕布), Duke Jiezhi of the Second Rank (輔國介直公; 26 January 1612 – 23 June 1646), 13th son
- Mistress (格格), of a certain clan (某氏), personal name Daiyinzha (代因扎)
  - Fiyanggū (費揚果; October/November 1620 – 1640), 16th son

== Ancestry ==
Sibeoci Fiyanggū
Fuman
Giocangga (1526–1583)
Douliji
Empress Zhi
Taksi (1543–1583)
Empress Yi
Nurhaci (1559–1626)
Douliji
Cancha
Agu
Empress Xuan (d. 1569)

== In popular culture ==
- In the opening scene of the 1984 film Indiana Jones and the Temple of Doom, Indiana Jones trades the remains of Nurhaci (contained in a small, ornate jade urn) for a diamond owned by Shanghai mobster Lao Che. In the film novelization Lao Che claimed to be a descendant of Nurhaci.
- The 2005 television series Taizu Mishi focused on the life of Nurhaci. He was portrayed by Steve Ma.
- Nurhaci was portrayed by Jing Gangshan in the 2017 television series Rule The World.
- Nurhaci is playable in the Civilization V 2011 Civilization and Scenario Pack: Korea. He appears as the leader of Manchuria in the Samurai Invasion of Korea scenario.

== Science ==
The genus Nurhachius, a pterodactyloid pterosaur, is named after Nurhaci.

== See also ==
- Chinese emperors family tree (late)
- Darughachi
- Li Chengliang
- Qing conquest of the Ming
- List of Buddha claimants

== Sources ==
- Crossley, Pamela Kyle (1997). The Manchus. Oxford: Blackwell Publishers. ISBN 9780631235910.
- Fuchs, Walter (1935), "Der Tod der Kaiserin Abahai i. J. 1626. Ein Beitrag zur Frage des Opfertodes (殉死) bei den Mandju [The death of empress Abahai in 1626: a contribution to the question of sacrificial death among the Manchus]", Monumenta Serica, 1 (1): 71–81, doi:10.1080/02549948.1935.11744911.
- Huang, Ray (1974). Taxation and governmental finance in sixteenth-century Ming China. London; New York: Cambridge University Press. ISBN 0521202833.
- Huang, Ray (1981). 1587, a Year of No Significance: The Ming Dynasty in Decline. New Haven: Yale University Press. ISBN 0300028849.
- Huang, Ray (1988). "The Lung-ch'ing and Wan-li reigns, 1567—1620". In Twitchett, Denis C; Mote, Frederick W. (eds.). The Cambridge History of China Volume 7: The Ming Dynasty, 1368–1644, Part 1. Cambridge: Cambridge University Press. pp. 511–584. ISBN 0521243335.
- Huang, Ray (1998). "The Ming fiscal administration". In Twitchett, Denis C; Mote, Frederick W. (eds.). The Cambridge History of China 8: The Ming Dynasty, 1368 — 1644, Part II. Cambridge: Cambridge University Press. pp. 106–171. ISBN 0521243335.
- Heijdra, Martin (1998). "The socio-economic development of rural China during the Ming". In Twitchett, Denis C; Mote, Frederick W. (eds.). The Cambridge History of China 8: The Ming Dynasty, 1368 — 1644, Part II. Cambridge: Cambridge University Press. pp. 417–578. ISBN 0521243335.
- Hummel, Arthur W., ed. (1943). Eminent Chinese of the Ch'ing Period. Vol. 2. Washington, D.C.: US Government Printing Office. OCLC 3443954.
- Ko, Shou-p'ing Wu (1855). Translation (by A. Wylie) of the Ts'ing wan k'e mung, a Chinese grammar of the Manchu Tartar language (by Woo Kĭh Show-ping, revised and ed. by Ching Ming-yuen Pei-ho) with intr. notes on Manchu literature.
  Translation of the Ts'ing wan k'e mung, a Chinese grammar of the Manchu Tartar language (PDF). Shanghae: London Mission Press. 1855. Archived from the original (PDF) on 3 September 2014.
- Narangoa, Li (2014). Historical Atlas of Northeast Asia, 1590-2010: Korea, Manchuria, Mongolia, Eastern Siberia. New York: Columbia University Press. ISBN 9780231160704.
- Li, Gertraude Roth (2002), "State Building before 1644", in Peterson, Willard J. (ed.), Cambridge History of China, Vol. 9, Part 1: The Ch'ing Dynasty to 1800, Cambridge: Cambridge University Press, pp. 9–72, ISBN 0-521-24334-3.
- Perdue, Peter C (2009). China Marches West: The Qing Conquest of Central Eurasia (reprint ed.). Harvard University Press. ISBN 978-0674042025.
- Swope, Kenneth M (2009). A Dragon's Head and a Serpent's Tail: Ming China and the First Great East Asian War, 1592-1598 (Campaigns and Commanders Series ed.). Norman, Oklahoma: University of Oklahoma Press. ISBN 978-0-8061-4056-8.
- Swope, Kenneth (2014), The Military Collapse of China's Ming Dynasty, Routledge
- Peterson, Willard J. (2002). the Cambridge History of China, the Ch'ing dynasty to 1800. Cambridge University Press. ISBN 0-521-24334-3.
- Wakeman, Frederic (1985). The Great Enterprise: The Manchu Reconstruction of Imperial Order in Seventeenth-Century China. Berkeley, Los Angeles, and London: University of California Press. ISBN 978-0-520-04804-1. In two volumes.
- Jerr, Nicole (2017). The Scaffolding of Sovereignty: Global and Aesthetic Perspectives on the History of a Concept. Columbia University Press.
- Hummel, Arthur W. Sr., ed. (1943). "Nurhaci" . Eminent Chinese of the Ch'ing Period. United States Government Printing Office.

Nurhaci House of Aisin Gioro Born: 1558 Died: 30 September 1626
Regnal titles
Preceded by Taksi	Chieftain of the Jianzhou Jurchens; 1583–1616	Position abolished Manchu-led Later Jin was established in 1616
New title Manchu-led Later Jin was established in 1616	Khan of Later Jin; 1616–1626	Succeeded by Hong Taiji
