= Later Jin (1616–1636) =

Jurchen-led dynasty in Manchuria

Jin 金 ᠮᠠᠨᠵᡠ ᡤᡠᡵᡠᠨ or ᠠᡳ᠌ᠰᡳᠨ ᡤᡠᡵᡠᠨ Aisin gurun
- 1616–1636
- Seal of the Tianming Khan of Jin: (1616–1635) Manchu:ᠠᠪᡴᠠᡳ ᡶᡠᠯᡳᠩᡤᠠ ᠠᡳᠰᡳᠨ ᡤᡠᡵᡠᠨ ᡥᠠᠨ ᡳ ᡩᠣᡵᠣᠨ abkai fulingga aisin gurun han i doron

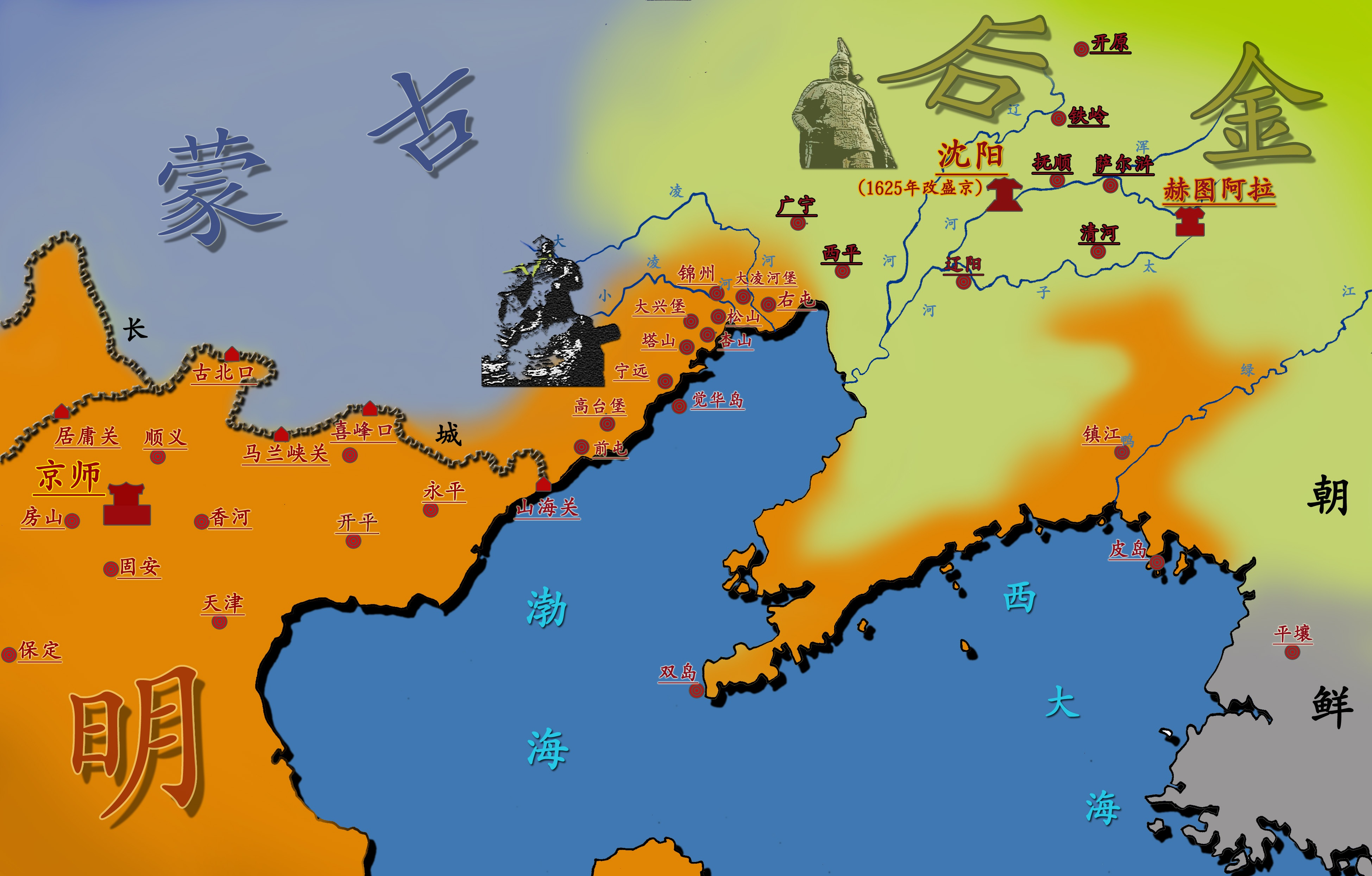
- Later Jin (后金) c. 1626 shown in light green
- Status: Khanate
- Capital: Hetu Ala (1616–1622); Dongjing (1622–1625); Mukden (1625–1636)
- Common languages: Jurchen (renamed Manchu after 1635), Mongolian, Chinese (Classical and Mandarin)
- Government: Absolute monarchy
- Khan
  - 1616–1626: Nurhaci
  - 1626–1636: Hong Taiji
- Legislature: Deliberative Council
- Historical era: Imperial era
  - Enthronement of the Tianming Khan: 1616
  - Proclamation of the Seven Grievances: 1618
  - Battle of Sarhū: 1619
  - Annexation of the Northern Yuan: 1635
  - Elevation to an empire: 1636
- Currency: Chinese coin, Chinese cash
Preceded by
Jianzhou Jurchens
Ming dynasty
Northern Yuan
Succeeded by
Qing dynasty
- Today part of: China; Mongolia; Russia; North Korea

Later Jin

Chinese name
- Traditional Chinese: 後金國
- Simplified Chinese: 后金国
- Literal meaning: Later Gold(en) State
Transcriptions
Standard Mandarin
- Hanyu Pinyin: Hòujīnguó; Hòu Jīn Guó
- Bopomofo: ㄏㄡˋ ㄐㄧㄣ ㄍㄨㄛˊ
- Wade–Giles: Hou⁴-chin¹-kuo²; Hou⁴ Chin¹ Kuo²
- Tongyong Pinyin: Hòujinguó; Hòu Jin Guó

Manchu name
- Manchu script: ᠠᠮᠠᡤᠠ ᠠᡳᠰᡳᠨ ᡤᡠᡵᡠᠨ
- Romanization: (Amaga) Aisin Gurun

The Later Jin, officially known as Jin or the Great Jin, was a Jurchen-led royal dynasty of China and a khanate ruled by the House of Aisin-Gioro in Manchuria, as the precursor to the Qing dynasty. Established in 1616 by the Jianzhou Jurchen chieftain Nurhaci upon his reunification of the Jurchen tribes, its name was derived from the earlier Jin dynasty founded by the Wanyan clan which had ruled northern China in the 12th and 13th centuries.

In 1635, the lingering Northern Yuan dynasty under Ejei Khan formally submitted to the Later Jin. The following year, Hong Taiji officially renamed the realm to "Great Qing", thus marking the start of the Qing dynasty. During the Ming–Qing transition, the Qing conquered Li Zicheng's Shun dynasty and various Southern Ming claimants and loyalists, going on to rule an empire comprising all of China, stretching as far as Tibet, Manchuria, Mongolia, Xinjiang, and Taiwan until the 1911 Revolution established the Republic of China.

== Name ==
Historians debate whether the official Chinese name of the state was "Jin" (金, Jīn), "Later Jin" (後金, Hòu Jīn), or both. Either describes it as a continuation or successor to the Jurchen-led Jin dynasty established by the Wanyan clan in 1115. The Manchu form of the name was ᠠᡳ᠌ᠰᡳᠨ ᡤᡠᡵᡠᠨ (Aisin Gurun), meaning simply "Golden State".

== History ==
=== Rise of Jianzhou Jurchens ===
The Jurchen people had traditionally lived in Manchuria and were then divided into three tribes, the most powerful of which during the Ming dynasty was called Jianzhou Jurchens, living around the Changbai Mountains. In order to attack and suppress the Northern Yuan dynasty, the Hongwu Emperor sent military commissions to gain control of the Jurchen tribes in Manchuria. The Ming government divided the Jianzhou Jurchens into three wei (a military subdivision during the Ming dynasty), collectively known as the "Three Wei of Jianzhou". The leaders of the Jurchen tribes were usually chosen as commanders of the wei.

The northern tribe Wild Jurchens were strong at that time, and attacked the Jianzhou Jurchens. Mengtemu, commander of the Jianzhou Wei, was killed. The Jianzhou Jurchens were forced to move southwards, and finally settled at Hetu Ala.

=== Establishment of the Khanate ===
Originally a Ming vassal who officially considered himself a guardian of the Ming border and a local representative of imperial Ming power, the Jianzhou Jurchen leader Nurhaci promoted the unification of the Jurchens living in Manchuria at the beginning of the 17th century. He organized "Banners", military-social units that included Jurchen, Han Chinese, and Mongol elements. Nurhaci formed the Jurchen clans into a unified entity (which was renamed "Manchu" in 1635 by Hong Taiji), and proclaimed the establishment of the new dynasty called "Jin" (or "Great Jin") in 1616 and ruled as a khan. This marks the start of the Later Jin dynasty.

=== Expansion ===
With the establishment of the Later Jin dynasty, Nurhaci took a hostile attitude towards the Ming for favoritism and meddling in the affairs of the Jurchen tribes. In 1618, he proclaimed his Seven Grievances (nadan amba koro; 七大恨) which effectively declared war on the Ming dynasty. He occupied Fushun, Qinghe (清河) and other cities before retreating. The death of the Ming Vice-General Zhang Chengyin (張承蔭) during the Battle of Fushun stunned the Ming court. In 1619, he attacked the Yehe (葉赫) in an attempt to provoke the Ming. The Ming responded by dispatching expeditionary forces led by Military Commissioner Yang Hao along four routes to besiege Hetu Ala. In a series of winter battles known collectively as the Battle of Sarhū Nurhaci broke three of the four Ming armies, forcing the survivors and the fourth to retreat in disorder. This caused the power sphere of the Later Jin to extend over the entire eastern part of Liaoyang.

Relocating his court from Jianzhou to Liaodong provided Nurhaci access to more resources; it also brought him in close contact with the Khorchin Mongol domains on the plains of Mongolia. Although by this time the once-united Mongol nation had long since fragmented into individual and hostile tribes, these tribes still presented a serious security threat to the Ming borders. Nurhaci's policy towards the Khorchins was to seek their friendship and cooperation against the Ming, securing his western border from a powerful potential enemy.

The unbroken series of military successes by Nurhaci came to an end in January 1626 when he was defeated by Yuan Chonghuan while laying siege to Ningyuan. He died a few months later and was succeeded by his eighth son, Hong Taiji, who emerged after a short political struggle amongst other potential contenders as the new khan.

Although Hong Taiji was an experienced leader and the commander of two Banners at the time of his succession, his reign did not start well on the military front. The Jurchens suffered yet another defeat in 1627 at the hands of Yuan Chonghuan. As before, this defeat was in part due to the Ming's newly acquired cannons. To redress his technological and numerical disparity, Hong Taiji in 1634 created his own artillery corps, the ujen cooha (重軍) from among his existing Han troops who cast their own cannons with the help of defector Chinese metallurgists.

One of the defining events of Hong Taiji's reign was the official adoption of the name "Manchu" (满洲) for the united Jurchen people in November 1635. In 1635, the Manchus' Mongol allies were fully incorporated into a separate Banner hierarchy under direct Manchu command. Hong Taiji conquered the territory north of Shanhai Pass by the Ming dynasty and Ligdan Khan in Inner Mongolia.

In April 1636, Mongol nobility of Inner Mongolia, Manchu nobility, and the Han mandarin held the Kurultai in Shenyang, recommended the khan of Later Jin to be the emperor of the Great Qing empire. One of the Yuan dynasty's jade seals was also dedicated to the emperor (Bogd Sécén Khaan) by nobility. When he was said to be presented with the imperial seal of the Yuan dynasty by Ejei Khan, Hong Taiji renamed his state from "Jin" to "Great Qing" and elevated his position from Khan to Emperor, suggesting imperial ambitions beyond unifying the Manchu tribes, and marking the formal end of the Later Jin period.

=== Aftermath ===
This was followed by the creation of the first two Han Banners in 1637 (increased to eight in 1642). Together these military reforms enabled Hong Taiji to resoundingly defeat Ming forces in a series of battles from 1640 to 1642 for the territories of Songshan and Jinzhou. This final victory resulted in the surrender of many of the Ming dynasty's most battle-hardened troops, the death of Yuan Chonghuan at the hands of the Chongzhen Emperor (who mistakenly thought Yuan had betrayed him), and the complete and permanent withdrawal of the remaining Ming forces north of the Great Wall.

Hong Taiji died suddenly in September 1643 without a designated heir. His five-year-old son, Fulin, was installed as the Shunzhi Emperor, with Hong Taiji's half brother Dorgon as regent and de facto leader of the Qing dynasty.

In 1644, Shun forces led by Li Zicheng captured the Ming capital, Beijing. However, the Qing would soon defeat and destroy Li Zicheng's forces. The Ming general Wu Sangui refused to serve Li's Shun forces. Wu instead made an alliance with the Qing and opened the Shanhai Pass to the Banner armies led by Dorgon, who defeated Li and the rebels at the Battle of Shanhai Pass and seized the capital. Zhang Xianzhong and enfeoffed princes of the Ming imperial family remained in control of southern China as the Southern Ming, but the Qing dynasty took control of their territories by 1683.

== Gallery ==
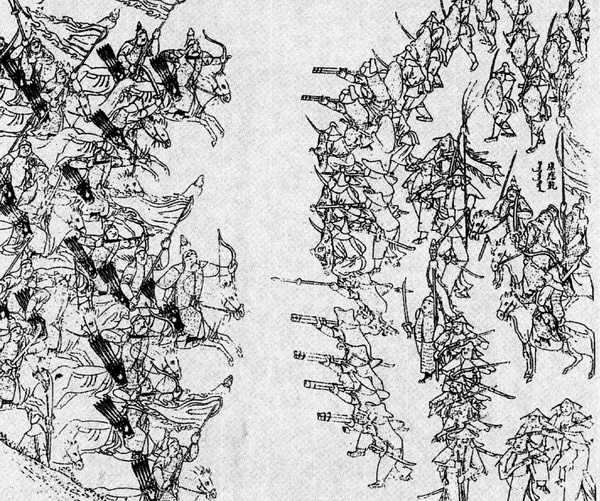
Later Jin cavalry charging Ming infantry in the Battle of Sarhū.

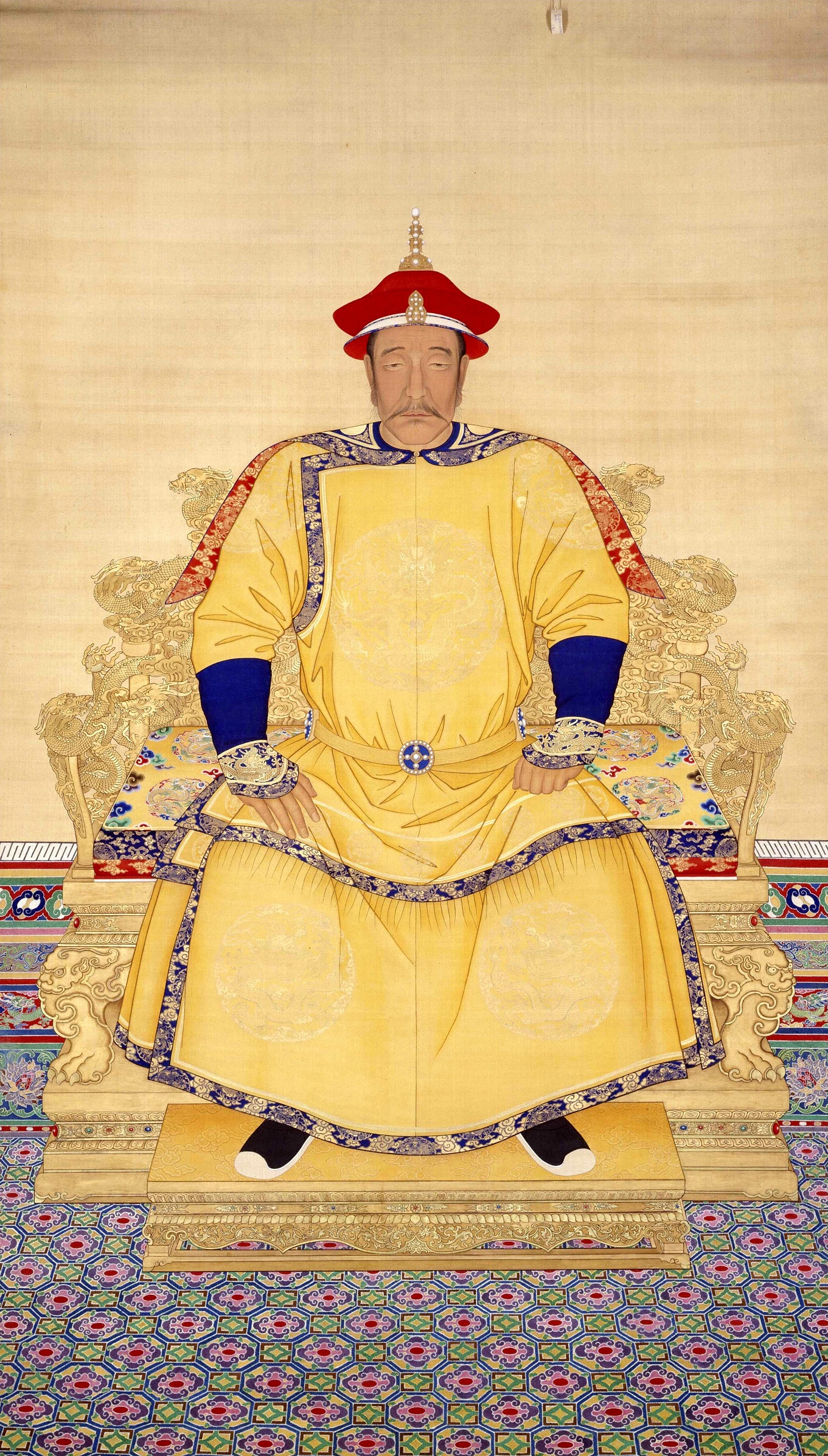
Official portrait of Nurhaci, the founder of the Later Jin dynasty.

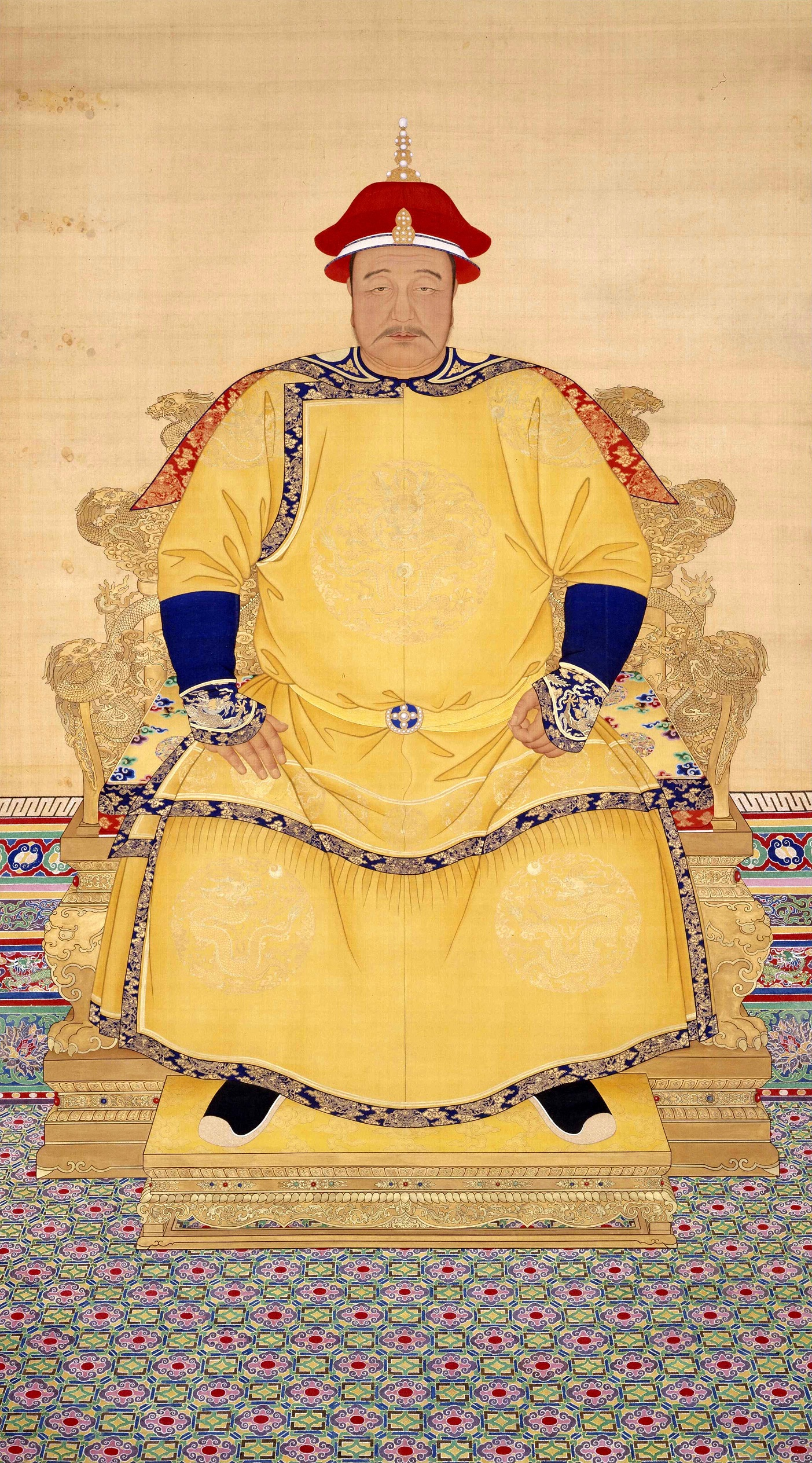
Official portrait of Hong Taiji, the second khan of the Later Jin dynasty and subsequently the founder of the Qing dynasty.

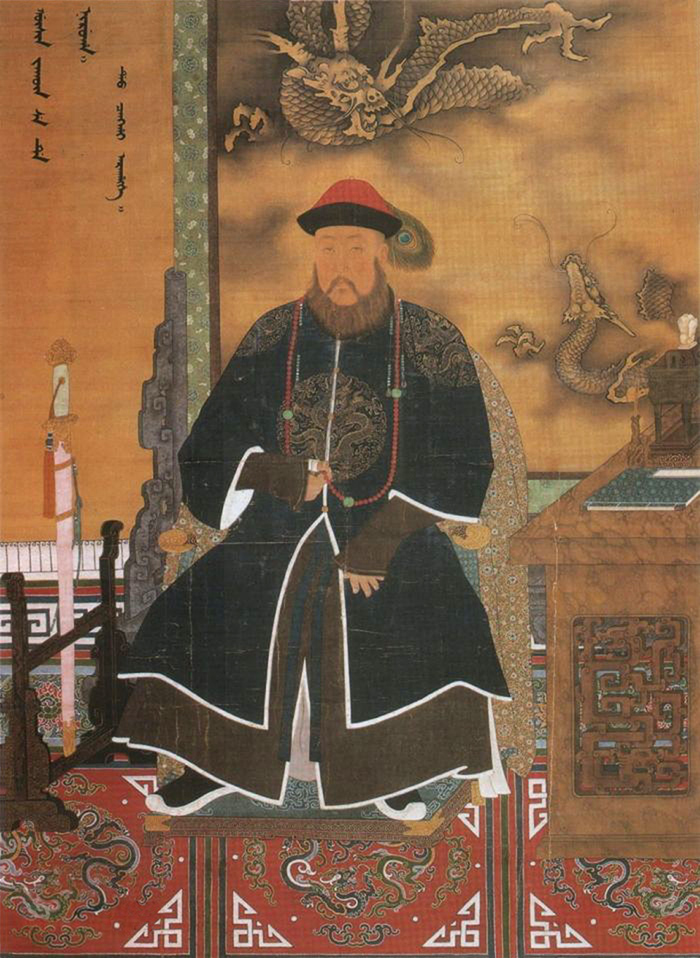
Dorgon, the Prince Rui.

== See also ==
- Qing dynasty
- Jin dynasty (1115–1234)
- Jianzhou Jurchens
- Aisin Gioro
- Seven Grievances
