= Timeline of the Qing dynasty =

The Qing Empire ca. 1820, marked the time when the Qing began to rule these areas.

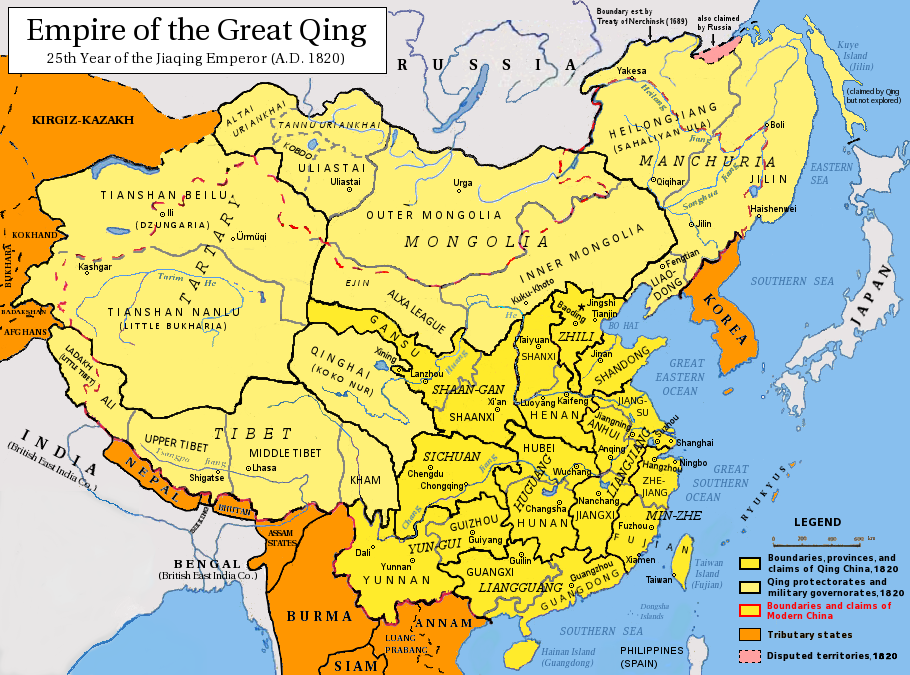
Qing dynasty in 1820. Includes provincial boundaries and the boundaries of modern China for reference.

This is a timeline of the Qing dynasty (1644–1912).

== Background ==
=== 16th century ===
==== 1580s ====
Year	Date	Event
1583		Nurhaci becomes leader of the Jianzhou Left Branch
1587		Nurhaci founds Fe Ala

==== 1590s ====
Year	Date	Event
1592		Japanese invasions of Korea (1592–98): Nurhaci offers to fight the Japanese but is refused; Ming reacts with alarm to the size and quality of Nurhaci's troops
1593		Nurhaci defeats the Hulun Confederation and Khorchin Mongols

=== 17th century ===
==== 1600s ====
Year	Date	Event
1600		Nurhaci creates the Banner Army
1601		Nurhaci subjugates the Hada
1603		Nurhaci and Ming generals agree to delineate the boundary between their territories
1603		Nurhaci moves his capital to Hetu Ala due to water problems at Fe Ala
1605		Gwanghaegun of Joseon sends an expedition north of the Tumen River to destroy the Jurchen Holjaon community
1607		Nurhaci subjugates the Hoifa

==== 1610s ====
Year	Date	Event
1611		Nurhaci subjugates the Wild Jurchens
1613		Nurhaci incorporates the Ula into his confederation
1615		Nurhaci increases the number of banners from four to eight
1615		Nurhaci sends his last tributary emissary to Beijing
1616		Nurhaci declares the Later Jin, also known as the Amaga Aisin Gurun
1618	9 May	Battle of Fushun: Later Jin seizes Fushun
1618	summer	Battle of Qinghe: Later Jin takes Qinghe
1619	18 April	Battle of Sarhū: Ming forces are annihilated by Later Jin
1619	26 July	Battle of Kaiyuan: Later Jin takes Kaiyuan
1619	3 September	Battle of Tieling: Later Jin takes Tieling
1619	September	Battle of Xicheng: Later Jin annexes the Yihe Jurchens
		Chahar-Jurchen War: Ligdan Khan attacks Guangning, a horse trading town under the protection of Nurhaci, but is defeated

==== 1620s ====
Year	Date	Event
1621	4 May	Battle of Shen-Liao: Later Jin seizes Shenyang
1621	December	Battle of Fort Zhenjiang: Ming raids into Later Jin are repulsed
1622	11 March	Battle of Guangning: Later Jin seizes Guangning
1625		Chahar-Jurchen War: Ligdan Khan's attack is turned back by a combined Khorchin Jurchen force
1626	10 February	Battle of Ningyuan: A Later Jin attack on Ningyuan is repulsed and Nurhaci is wounded
1626	30 September	Nurhaci succumbs to his wounds and dies
1627	January - March	Later Jin invasion of Joseon: Hong Taiji is elected khan and subjugates Joseon
1627	spring	Battle of Ning-Jin: Later Jin forces under Hong Taiji attack Jinzhou but are repelled
1629	winter	Jisi Incident: Later Jin forces break through the Great Wall and loot the region around Beijing

==== 1630s ====
Year	Date	Event
1630	summer	Jisi Incident: Later Jin forces retreat
1631	21 November	Battle of Dalinghe: Later Jin seizes Dalinghe
1633	April	Wuqiao Mutiny: Shandong rebels defect to Later Jin
1633	summer	Siege of Lüshun: Later Jin seizes Lüshun
1634		Chahar-Jurchen War: Ligdan Khan of the Chahar Mongols is overthrown and displaced by Hong Taiji
1635		Hong Taiji unites all Jurchen tribes under the name of Manchu; so ends the Jurchens
1635		Hong Taiji attacks the Hurha

== 17th century ==
=== 1630s ===
Year	Date	Event
1636	April	Hong Taiji proclaims the Qing dynasty
1636	9 December	Qing invasion of Joseon: Hong Taiji invades Joseon
1637	30 January	Qing invasion of Joseon: Joseon is defeated and becomes a Qing tributary
1638		Qing dynasty conquers Shandong
1639		Qing dynasty attacks the Daur and Solon people

=== 1640s ===
Year	Date	Event
1640	May	Qing dynasty captures the Evenk fortresses of Duochen, Asajin, Yakesa, and Duojin
1642	8 April	Battle of Song-Jin: Qing dynasty takes Jinzhou
1643		Northeastern natives submit to the Qing dynasty
1644	27 May	Battle of Shanhai Pass: Wu Sangui lets the Qing forces through the Great Wall and their forces defeat Li Zicheng in battle, after which Li retreats to Beijing
1644	5 June	Qing dynasty takes Beijing and Li Zicheng flees
1644	8 November	Shunzhi Emperor is enthroned in the Forbidden City
1645	January	Qing forces capture Luoyang
1645	20 May	Qing forces capture Yangzhou
1645	16 June	Qing forces capture Nanjing and the Hongguang Emperor
1645	6 July	Qing forces capture Hangzhou
1645	21 July	All nonclerical adult male citizens are ordered to adopt the Manchu queue to show their allegiance to the Qing dynasty
1646	February	Ming forces are defeated in Jiangnan
1646	10 July	Qing forces defeat the Ming army at Tonglu
1646	30 September	Qing forces capture Yanping
1646	6 October	The Longwu Emperor is killed by Qing forces
1646	17 October	Qing forces take Fuzhou
1647	2 January	Zhang Xianzhong is killed by Qing forces but his army occupies Chongqing and then occupies Sichuan under the leadership of Sun Kewang
1647	20 January	Qing forces capture Guangzhou and the Shaowu Emperor
1647	5 March	Qing forces conquer Guangdong, half of Guangxi, and Hainan
1647	March	Qing forces take Changsha
1647	spring	Qing forces raid Anping
1647	23 September	Qing forces take Wugang
1648	20 February	Ming loyalists rebel at Nanchang and Nanning
1648	14 April	Qing forces fail to take Guilin
1649	15 January	Ming loyalists rebel at Datong
1649	1 March	Qing forces take Nanchang
1649	4 October	Ming loyalists at Datong are defeated
1649	summer	Qing forces conquer southern Huguang
1649	24 November	Qing forces slaughter the population of Guangzhou
1649	27 November	Qing forces capture Guilin
1649	2 December	Qing forces capture Zhaoqing and the Yongli Emperor flees

=== 1650s ===
Year	Date	Event
1651	15 October	Qing forces capture Zhoushan and Zhu Yihai flees
1652	24 March	Qing attack on Achansk is defeated
1652	7 August	Rebel general Li Dingguo takes Guilin
1652	winter	Sun Kewang's army is routed by Qing forces
1654	July	Battle of Hutong: Korean-Manchu army defeats a force of Russians
1654		Qing forces attack the Daur people
1655	March–April	Qing forces fail to take Komar
1655		Li Dingguo's army is routed by Qing forces
1656	9 May	Qing forces try to invade Kinmen Island (Quemoy) but their fleet is destroyed in a storm
1656		Qing forces attack the Daur people
1657	February	Ming forces defeat a Qing army near the Changjiang River Delta
1657	December	Sun Kewang surrenders to the Qing dynasty
1658	10 June	Battle of Hutong (1658): Qing-Joseon forces defeat a Russian fleet on the Songhua River
1658	June	Zheng Chenggong occupies Wenzhou
1659	7 January	Qing forces advance into Yunnan and the Yongli Emperor flees to Toungoo dynasty
1659	10 March	Qing forces capture Yongchang and defeat Li Dingguo's army, securing Yunnan
1659	10 August	Zheng Chenggong takes Zhenjiang
1659	24 August	Zheng Chenggong lays siege to Nanjing
1659	9 September	Zheng Chenggong's army is annihilated and he retreats to Xiamen

=== 1660s ===
Year	Date	Event
1660	February	Qing forces launch an attack on Kinmen Island (Quemoy) and Xiamen but fail
1660		Upkeep for the Eight Banners exceeds the entire Qing dynasty's regular income
1662	20 January	Qing forces advance towards Inwa and force the return of the Yongli Emperor
1662	May	The Yongli Emperor is executed in Yunnan; so ends the Southern Ming resistance on the mainland
1664		The Qing dynasty conquers Fujian and Zheng Jing retreats to Taiwan

=== 1670s ===
Year	Date	Event
1674		Poverty in the Eight Banners is noted to be caused by excessive and extravagant spending

=== 1680s ===
Year	Date	Event
1683	July	Battle of Penghu: Qing dynasty defeats the Kingdom of Tungning and conquers the island of Taiwan, beginning the period of Taiwan under Qing rule
1684		The Han Chinese banners, "Hanjun", decline to uselessness
1685	May–July	Siege of Albazin: Qing forces take Albazin
1686	July–October	Siege of Albazin: The Russians return to Albazin but the Qing forces lay siege to it again until the Russians are forced to leave
1689	27 August	Treaty of Nerchinsk: The Tsardom of Russia abandons the Amur River region to the Qing in return for trading privileges

=== 1690s ===
Year	Date	Event
1690	3 September	Battle of Ulan Butung: Galdan Boshugtu Khan leads 20,000 troops into battle with a Qing army 300 km north of Beijing, ending with Dzungar withdrawal
1691		The Khalkha Mongols submit to the Qing dynasty
1696		Battle of Jao Modo: The Qing dynasty invades Mongolia with 100,000 troops in three columns. Galdan Boshugtu Khan suffers defeat against the Western Route Army but manages to escape. The Qing dynasty takes all of Mongolia from the Dzungar Khanate
1698		Dzungar–Qing Wars: Qing dynasty occupies Hami

== 18th century ==
=== 1720s ===
Year	Date	Event
1720		Chinese expedition to Tibet (1720): The Qing dynasty expels the Dzungars from Tibet, beginning the period of Tibet under Qing rule
1720		Dzungar–Qing Wars: Amin Khoja leads a rebellion in Turpan against the Dzungar Khanate and defects to the Qing dynasty
1720		Zhu Yigui rebels in Taiwan and is defeated
1723		Plains aborigines living in Dajiaxi village along the central coastal plain of Taiwan rebel; the aborigines are defeated but Han Chinese settlers continue to rebel
1723		The government starts investing in the Eight Banners' livelihoods to reduce their reliance on state subsidies
1727		The government orders the comprehensive collection of genealogical tables for the Eight Banners
1728	25 June	Treaty of Kyakhta (1727): The Mongolian border of the Qing dynasty and Empire of Russia is delineated

=== 1730s ===
Year	Date	Event
1732		Dzungar–Qing Wars: The Dzungars attack Amin Khoja, who takes his people to settle in Guazhou
1732		Han Chinese rebels in Taiwan are defeated
1735		Miao Rebellion: Qing forces defeat and massacre 28,900 Miao and Kam people in Rongjiang
1735		Military upkeep reaches 32 million taels, a bit more than half of the empire's budget
1737		Dzungar–Qing Wars: Abuse by the Dzungars cause residents of the Tarim Basin to flee to the Qing dynasty

=== 1740s ===
Year	Date	Event
1742		Bannermen of Chinese origin who joined after 1644 are allowed to leave the banner system

=== 1750s ===
Year	Date	Event
1754		Dzungar–Qing Wars: The Dörbet and Amursana defect to the Qing dynasty
1754		State investment programs for the Eight Banners end
1754		Chinese bannermen at the Fuzhou, Guangzhou, Hangzhou, and Jingkou garrisons are "let go" and "excused" from their duties
1755		Dzungar–Qing Wars: The Qing dynasty sends 50,000 troops in two columns against the Dzungars, meeting little resistance, and complete the destruction of the khanate in just 100 days, however Amursana revolts in the aftermath The Dzungar genocide continues through 1758.
1756		All secondary status households in the Eight Banners are ordered to register as civilians
1757		Dzungar–Qing Wars: Amursana flees the Qing dynasty, dying in Tobolsk
1757		Chinese bannermen in Beijing who are too old, maimed, or incompetent are let go

=== 1760s ===
Year	Date	Event
1760		The government spends 4 million taels buying back land from Han owners for the Eight Banners
1761		Chinese bannermen at Suiyuan are replaced by Mongols and Manchus
1762		All Chinese bannermen are given the choice of leaving the banner system
1763		Chinese bannermen at Liangzhou and Zhuanglang are let go

=== 1770s ===
Year	Date	Event
1779		Chinese bannermen at Xi'an are let go

=== 1780s ===
Year	Date	Event
1786		Lin Shuangwen rebellion: Lin Shuangwen rebels in Taiwan
1788		Lin Shuangwen rebellion: Lin Shuangwen is defeated

== 19th century ==
=== 1820s ===
Year	Date	Event
1820		Poverty becomes endemic in the Eight Banners

=== 1840s ===
Year	Date	Event
1841		Ding Gongchen builds China's first steam engine
1842	29 August	The Treaty of Nanking is signed between Britain and China, to come into effect on 26 June 1843.

=== 1850s ===
Year	Date	Event
1850	December	Taiping Rebellion: Uprising of the rebel Taiping Heavenly Kingdom against the Qing dynasty.

=== 1860s ===
Year	Date	Event
1863		Restrictions on banner occupations are officially lifted to no effect

=== 1870s ===
Year	Date	Event
1871	December	Mudan incident: A Ryukyuan tributary ship crashes off the southern coast of Taiwan
1872	July	Mudan incident: The survivors of the Ryukyuan shipwreck who survive a massacre by Taiwanese indigenous peoples find shelter among Han Chinese locals and are shipped home from mainland China
1874		Japanese invasion of Taiwan (1874): Japanese forces invade aboriginal territory in southern Taiwan using the Mudan incident as pretext and retreat after forcing the Qing to pay an indemnity

=== 1890s ===
Year	Date	Event
1895	17 April	First Sino-Japanese War: The Qing cede the Penghu islands and Taiwan to Japan in the Treaty of Shimonoseki
1898	11 June	The Guangxu Emperor begins the Hundred Days' Reform
1898	5 September	Zhang Yuanji recommends ending Manchu-Han differences and dissolving the Eight Banners system
1898	21 September	Empress Dowager Cixi puts the Guangxu Emperor under house arrest
1898	22 September	Empress Dowager Cixi comes to power

== 20th century ==
=== 1900s ===
Year	Date	Event
1900	June	Boxer Rebellion: Empress Dowager Cixi declares war on foreign powers
1900	14 August	Boxer Rebellion: Foreign troops enter Beijing
1900	7 September	Boxer Rebellion: The Boxer Protocol is signed
1900	17 September	Boxer Rebellion: Foreign troops leave Beijing
1901	July	The Zongli Yamen is replaced with the Ministry of Foreign Affairs
1902	7 January	Empress Dowager Cixi returns to Beijing
1902	1 February	Ban on intermarriage between Manchus and Han Chinese is lifted
1903	29 December	Manchu monopoly on posts in the Eight Banners is abolished
1905	16 July	The government issues an edict proclaiming the need for leading officials to investigate new ways of government from abroad
1905	24 September	Anti-Manchu proponent Wu Yue fails to assassinate the constitutional study commissioners
1905		The prohibition on transfer of property from the Eight Banners to civilians is lifted
1906	1 September	Empress Dowager Cixi promises to form a constitutional government with no specified date
1907	April	The territories of Manchuria are reorganized into provinces
1907	6 July	Anhui governor Enming is assassinated by the anti-Manchu Xu Xilin
1907	20 September	Empress Dowager Cixi declares her intention to create "a bicameral deliberative body"
1907	27 September	An edict is passed to disband provincial banner garrisons over a 10-year period
1907	9 October	An edict is passed to create a set of codes which apply uniformly to Manchus and Han Chinese

== Gallery ==
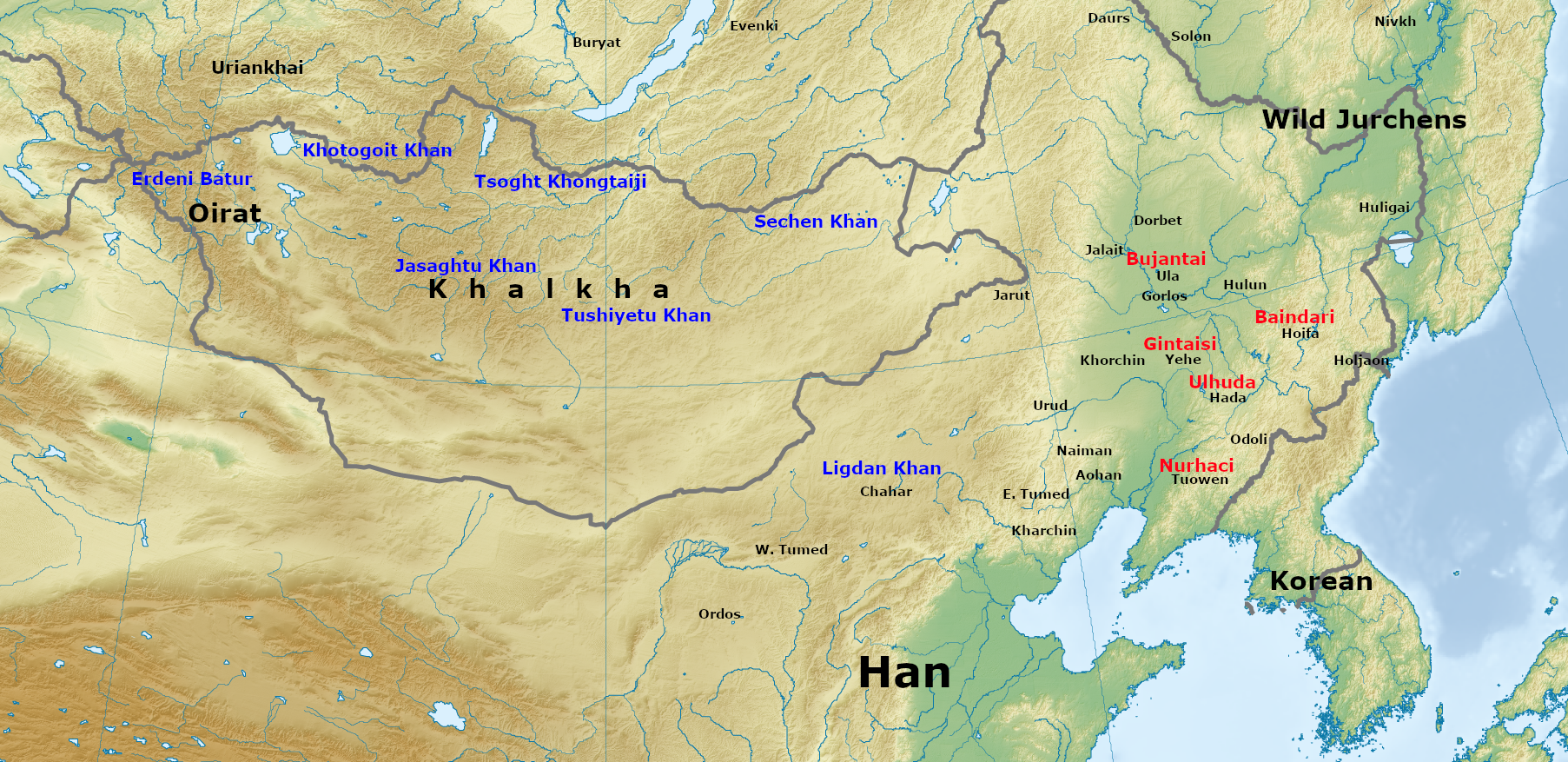
Major Mongol and Jurchen rulers on the eve of the Jurchen unification and conquest (early 17th century)

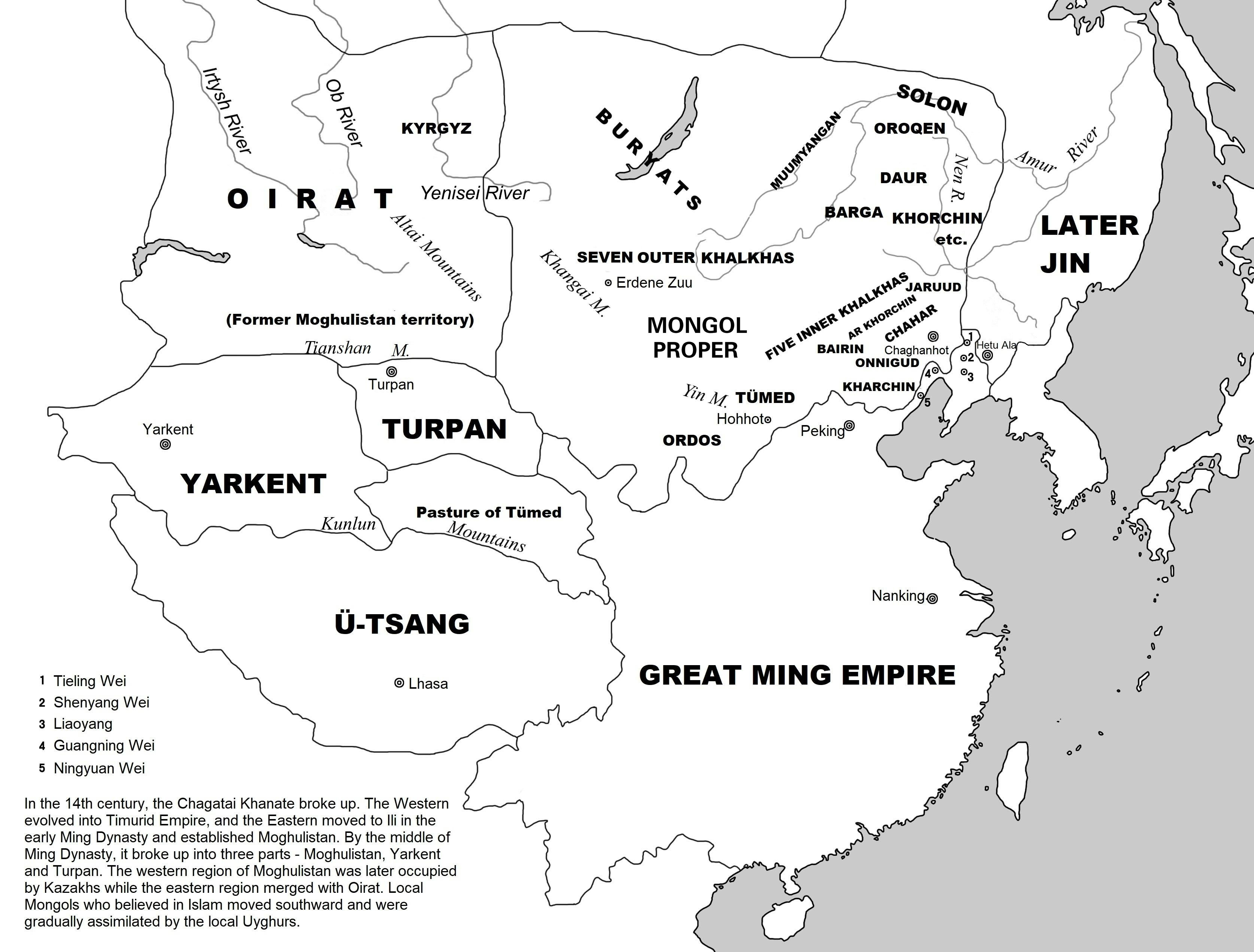
Mainland East Asia in 1616

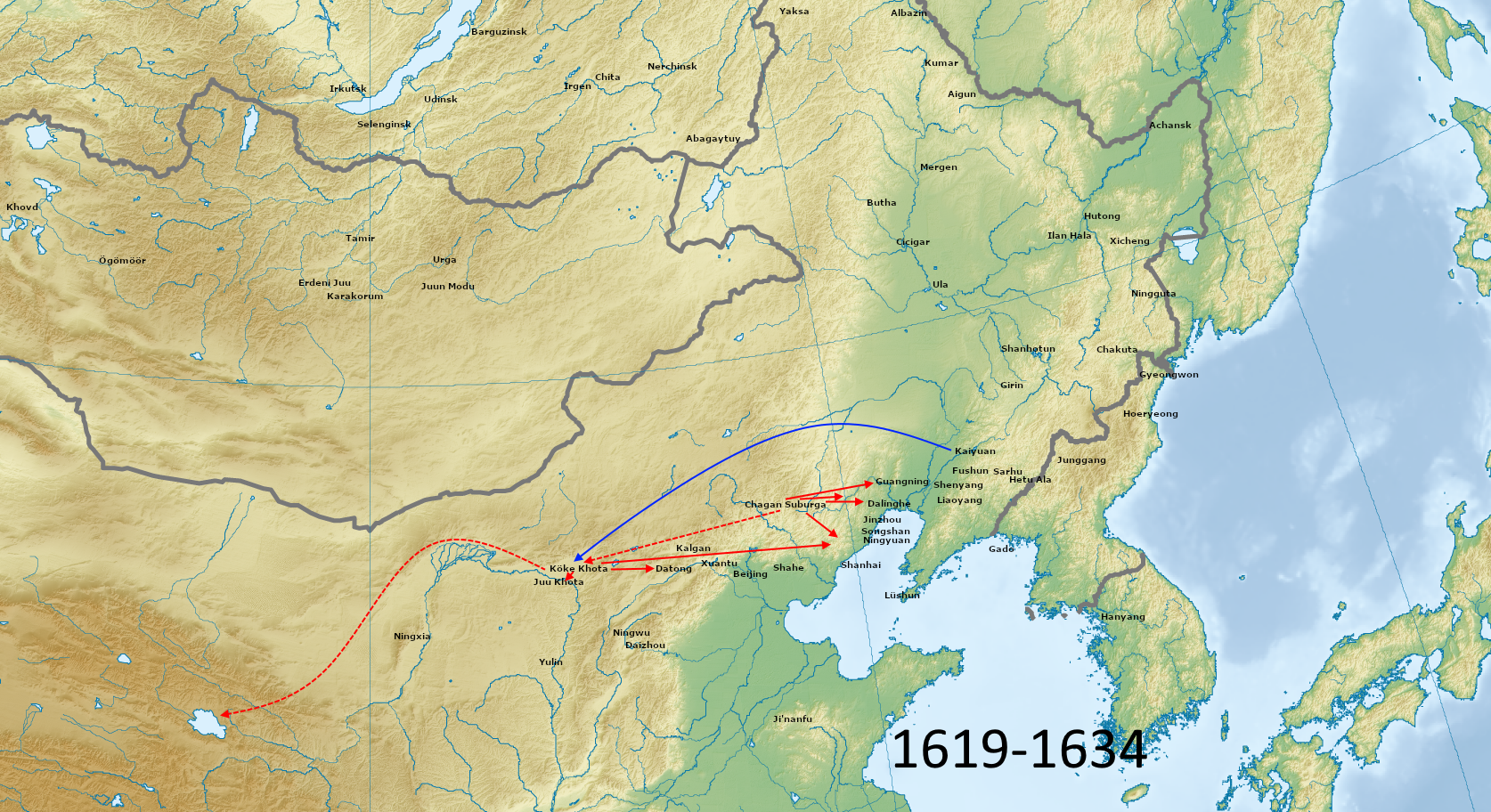
Chahar-Jurchen War (1619–1634)

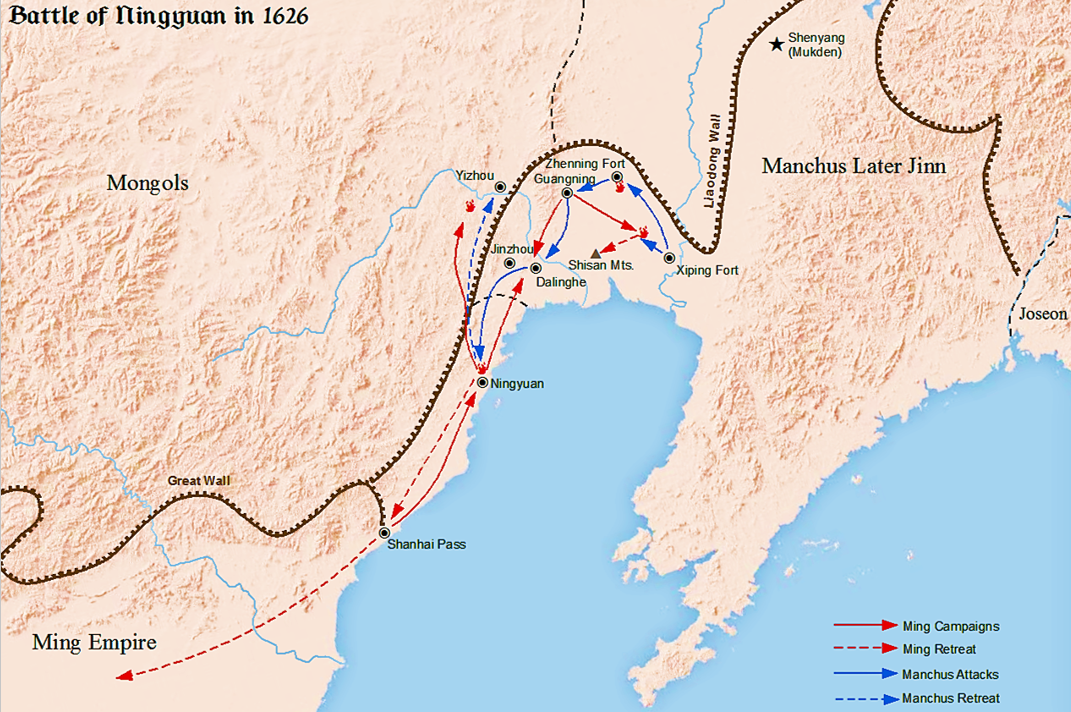
Battle of Ningyuan in 1626

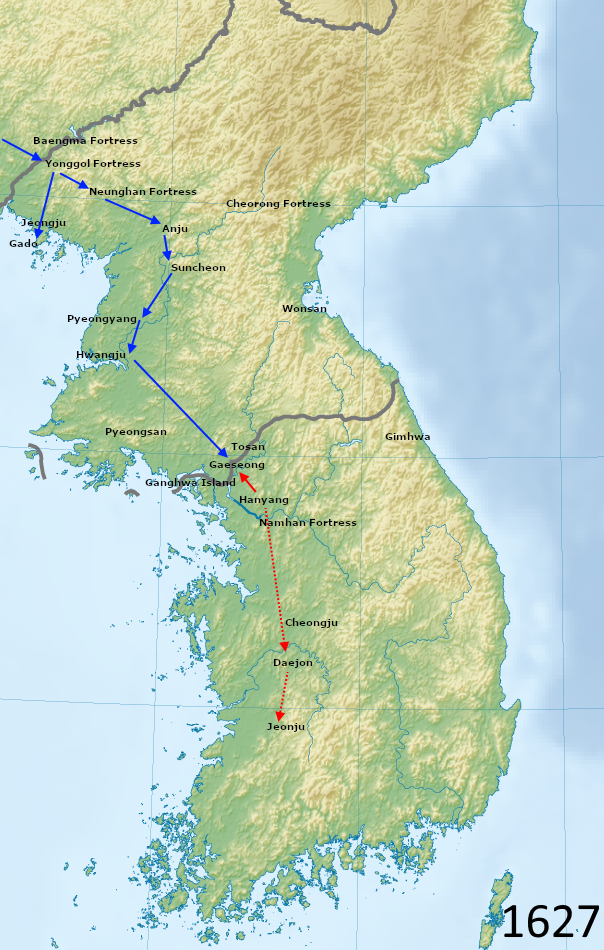
Later Jin invasion of Joseon in 1627

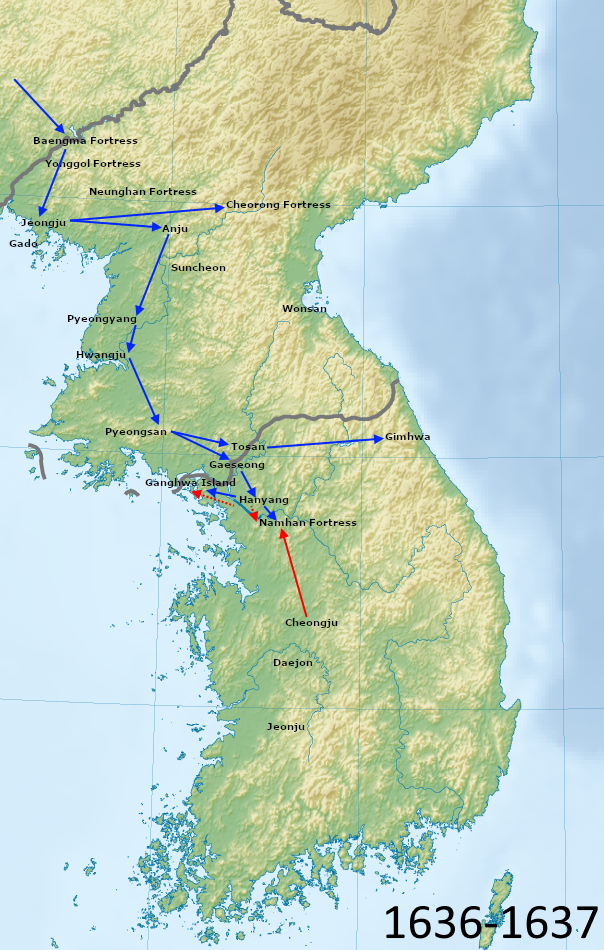
Qing invasion of Joseon in 1636

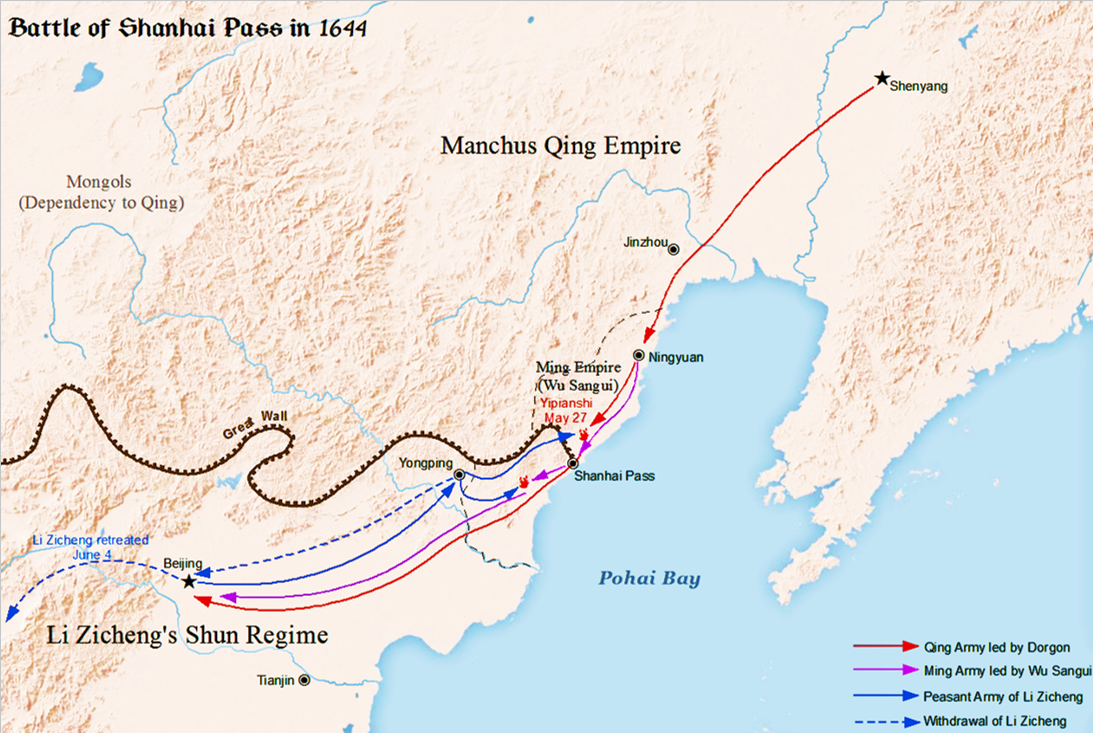
Battle of Shanhai Pass in 1644

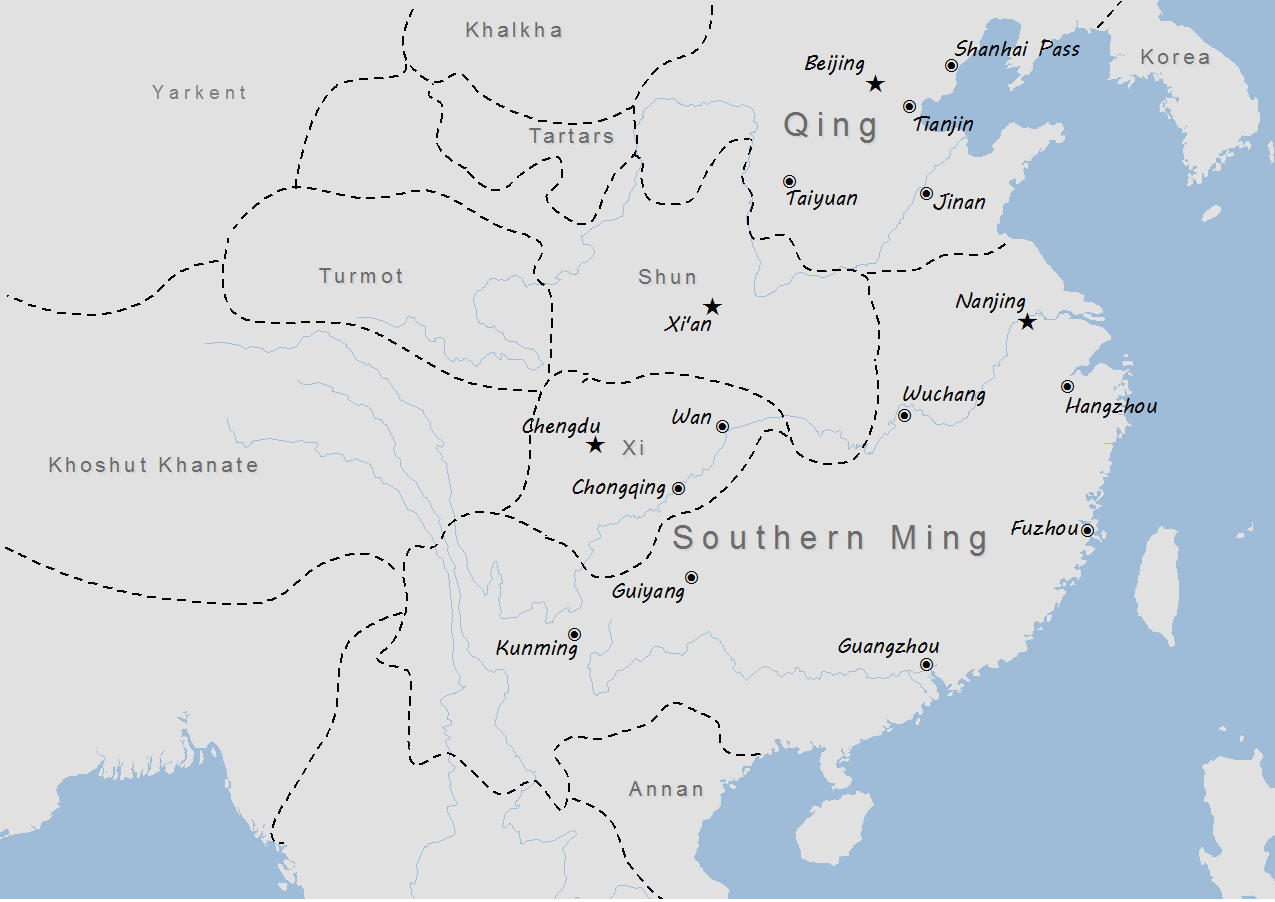
Southern Ming in November 1644

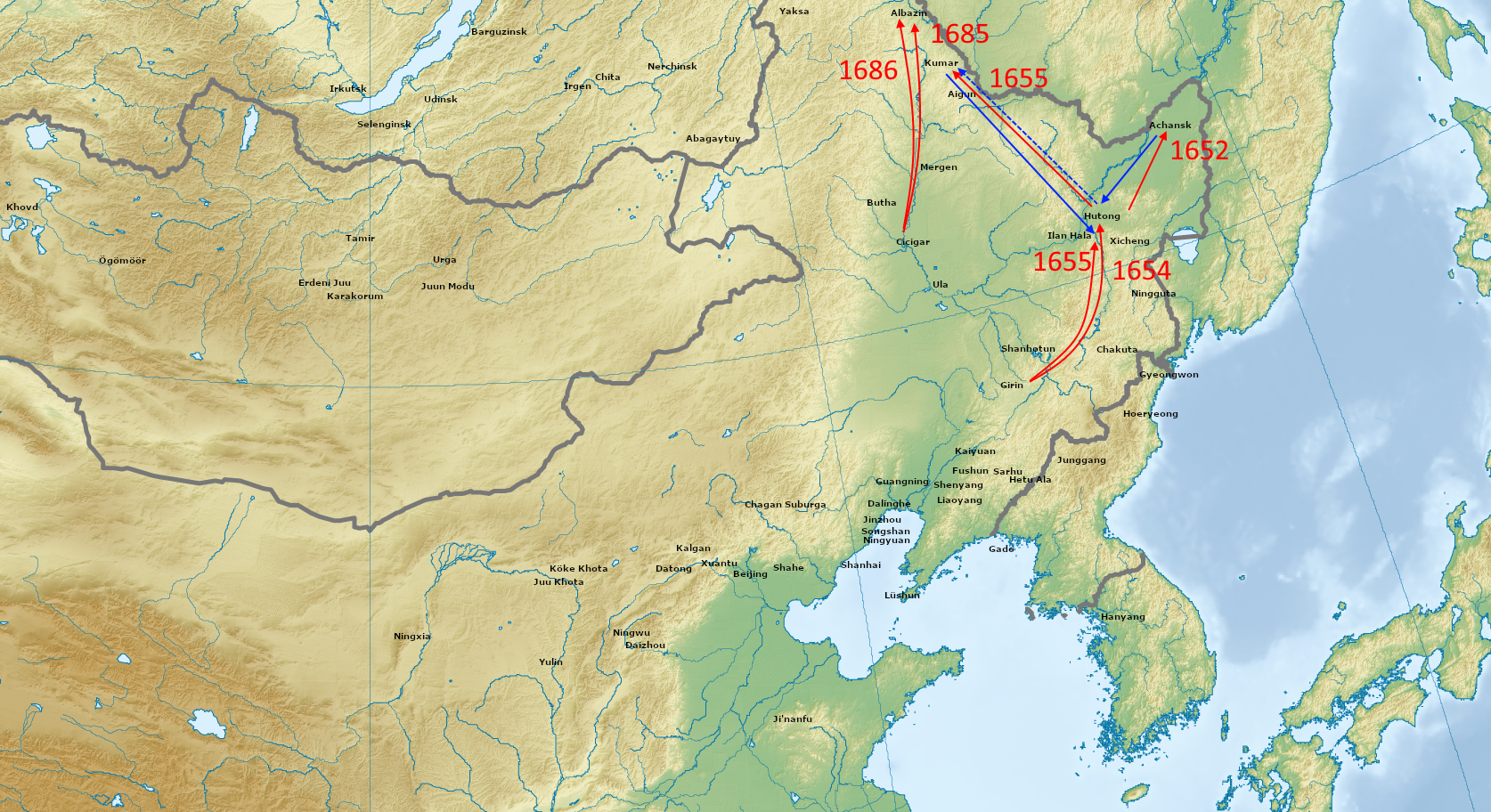
Russian-Qing border conflicts (1652–1686)

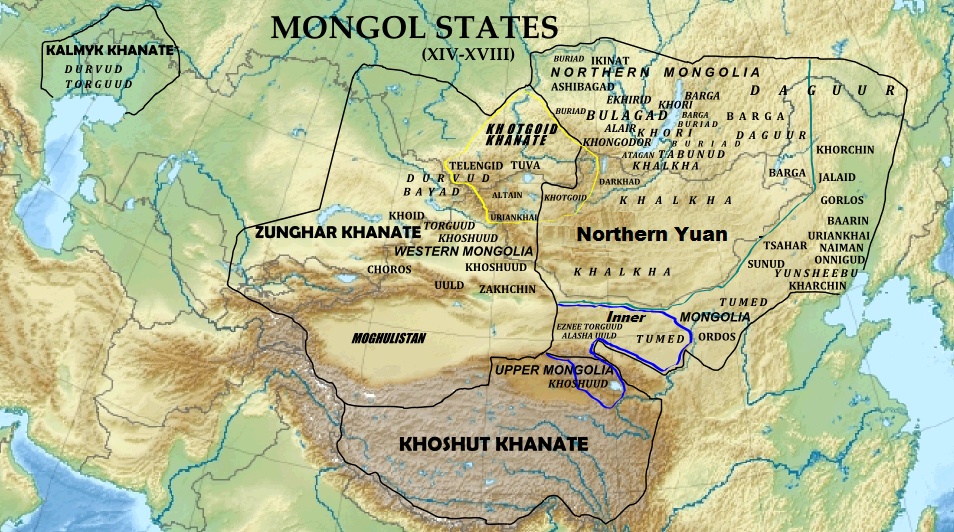
Dzungar Khanate (1634–1758) and Khoshut Khanate (1642–1717)

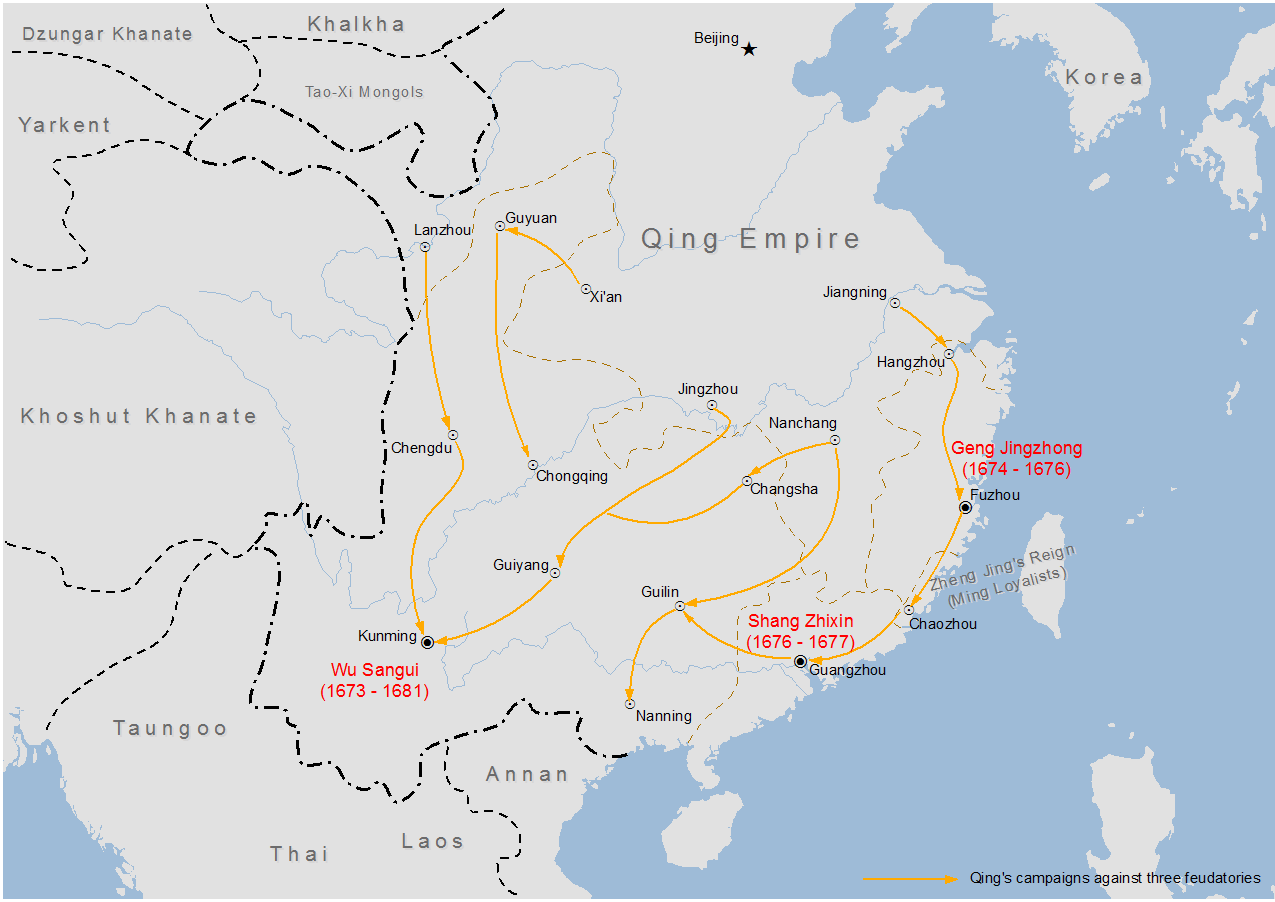
Revolt of the Three Feudatories (1673–1681)

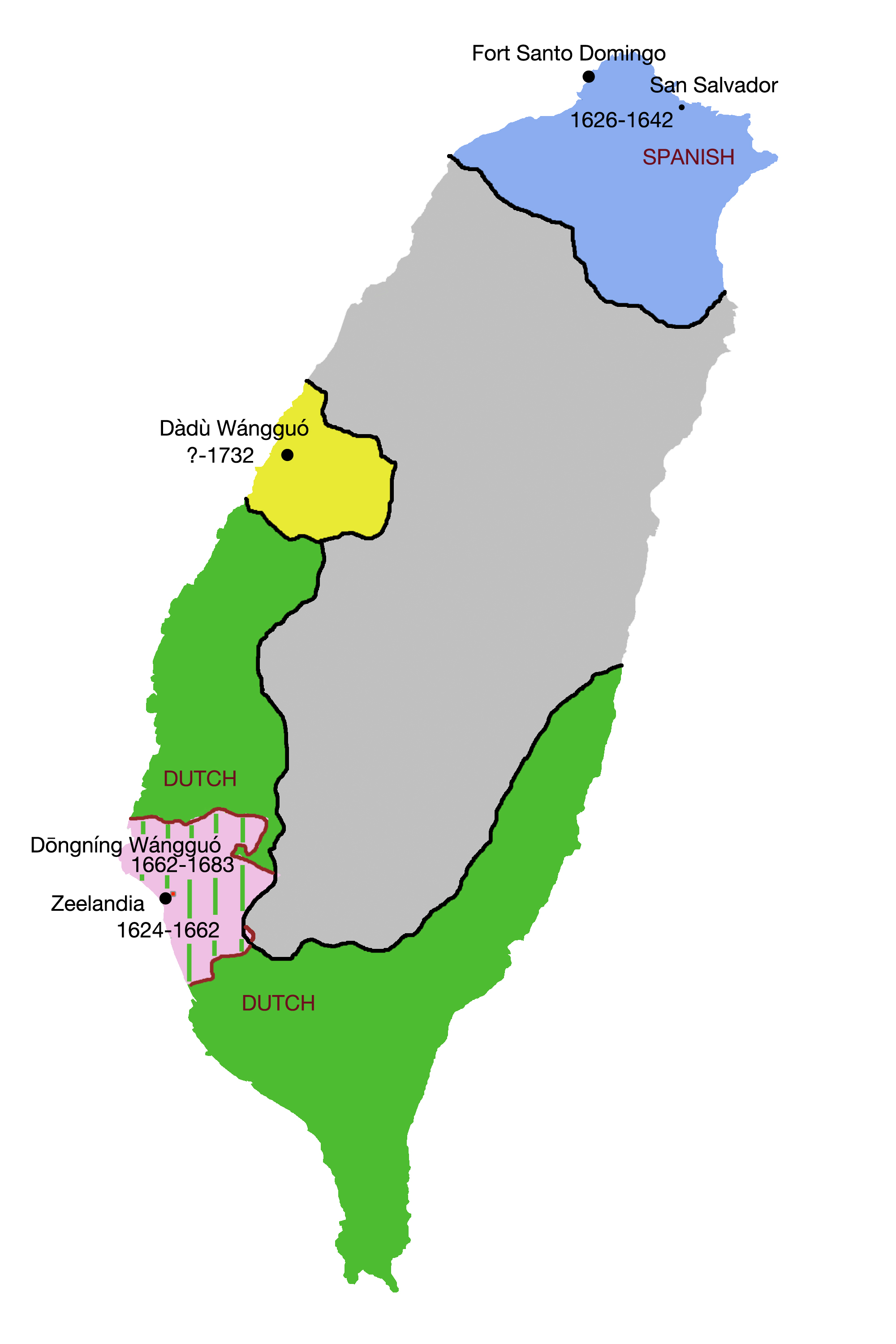
Taiwan in the 17th century prior to the Qing conquest in 1683

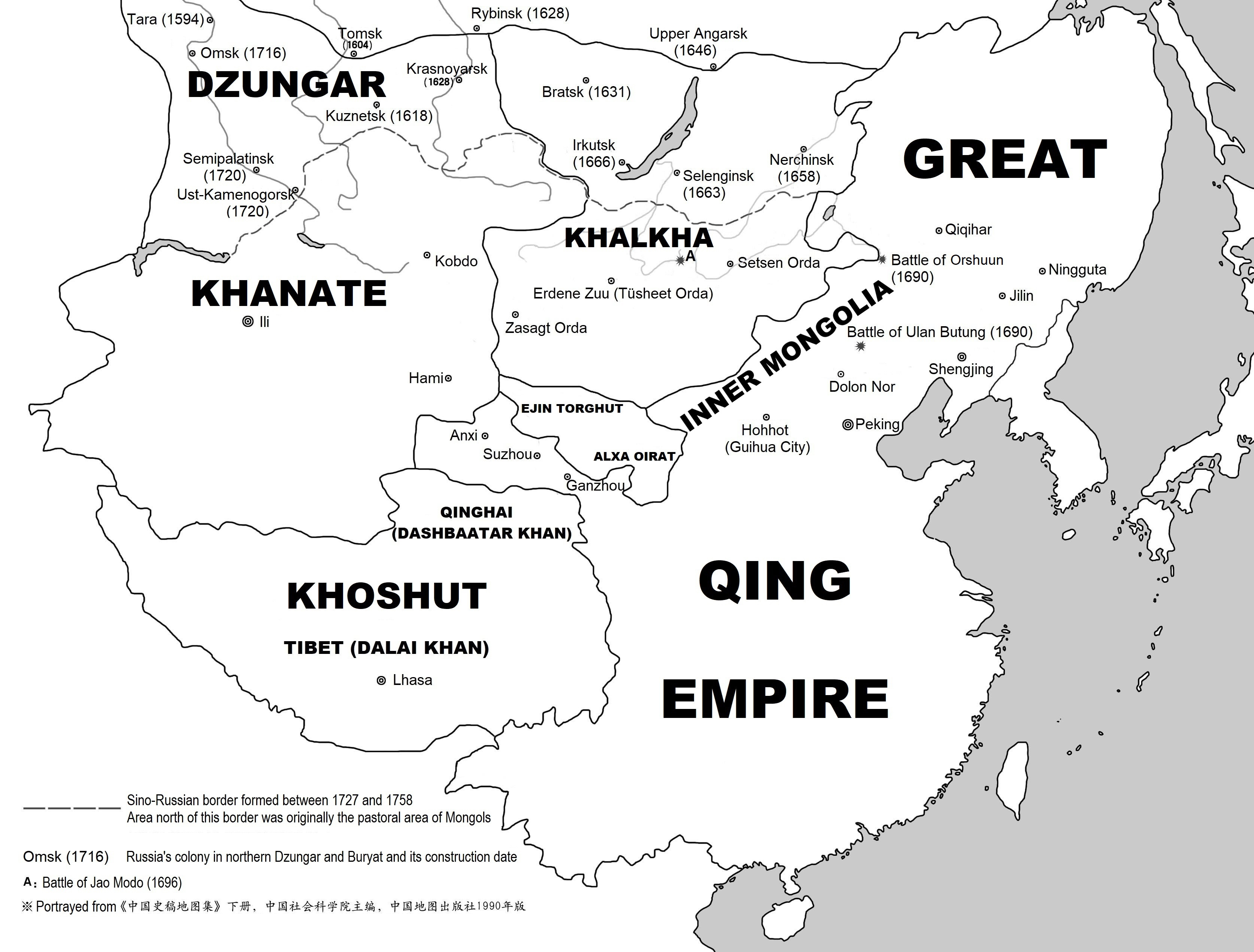
Mainland East Asia in 1688

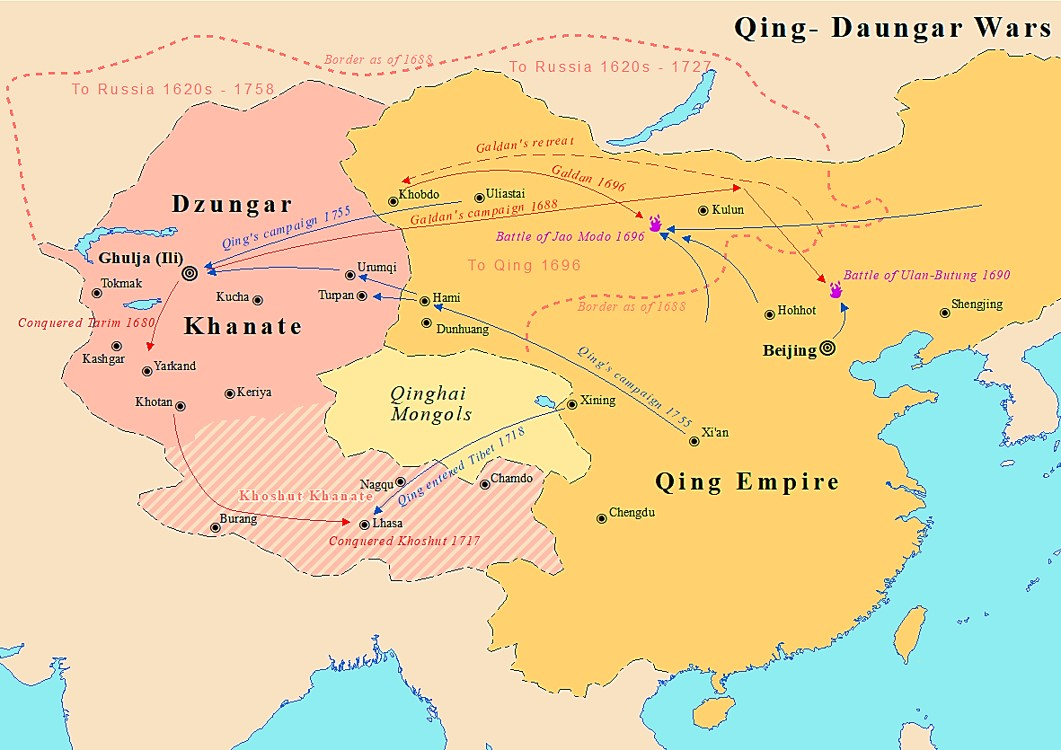
Dzungar–Qing Wars (1687–1757)

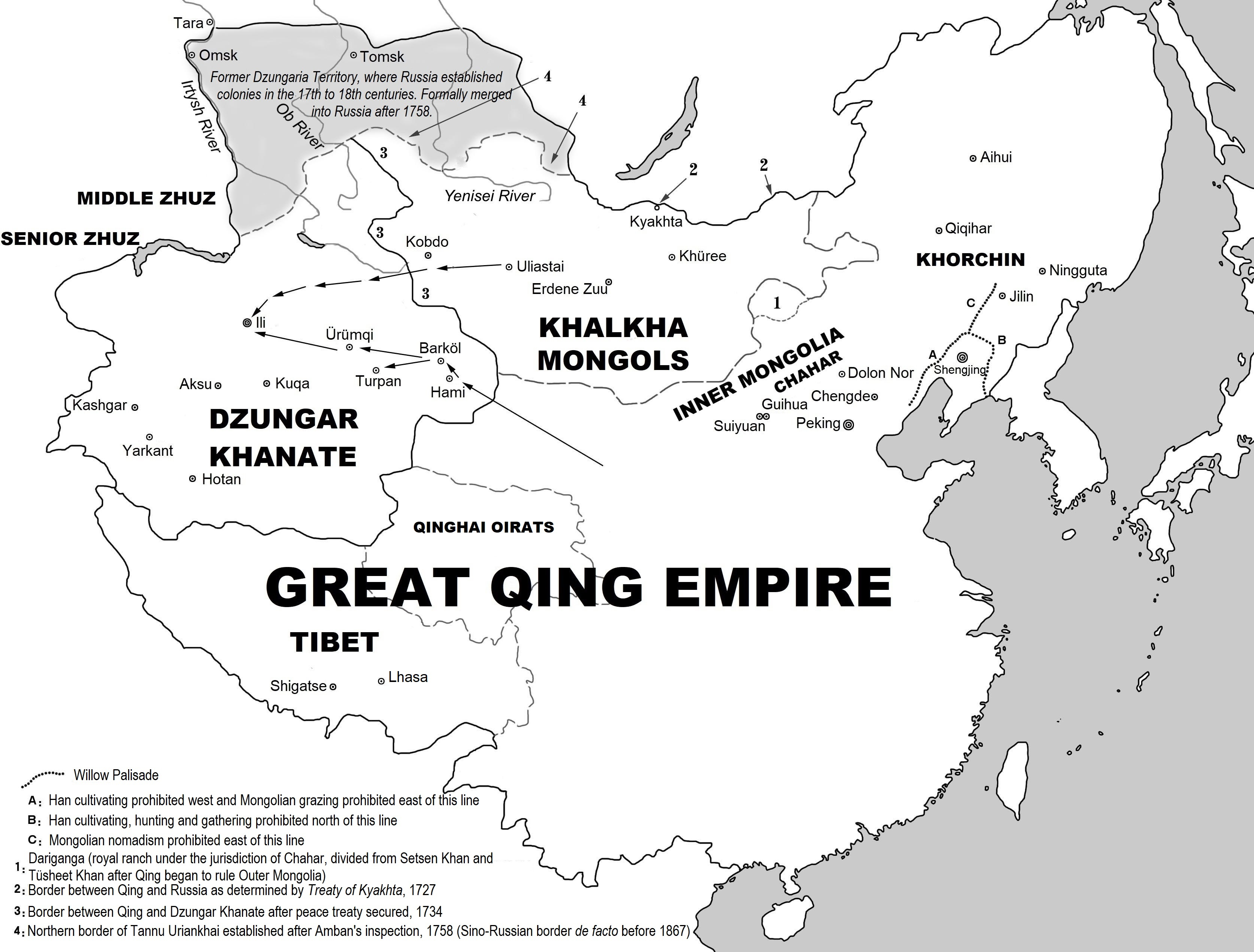
Mainland East Asia in 1757

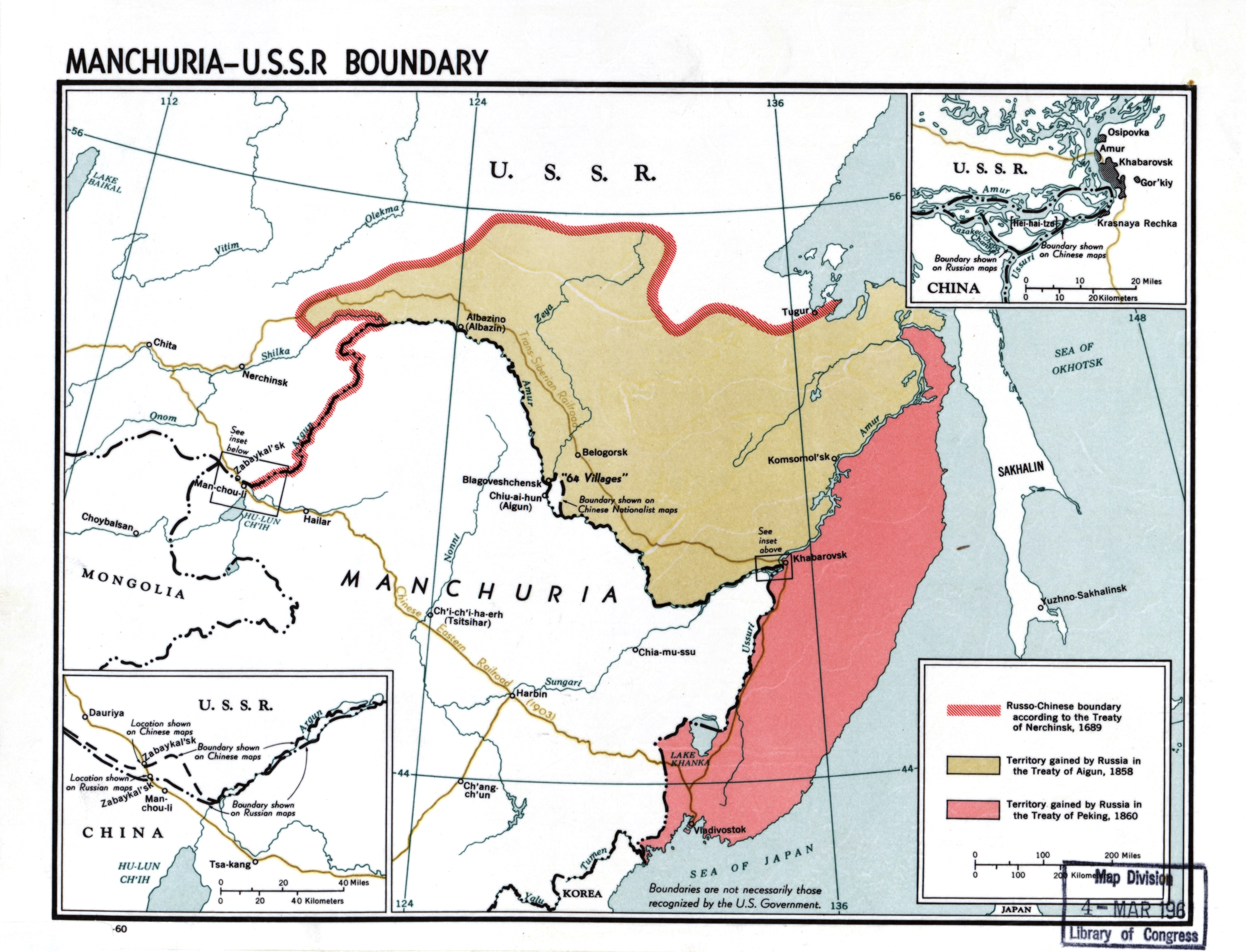
Changes in Russian-Chinese borders from the Treaty of Nerchinsk in 1689 to the Convention of Peking in 1860

First Opium War (1839–1842)

Taiping Rebellion (1850–1864)

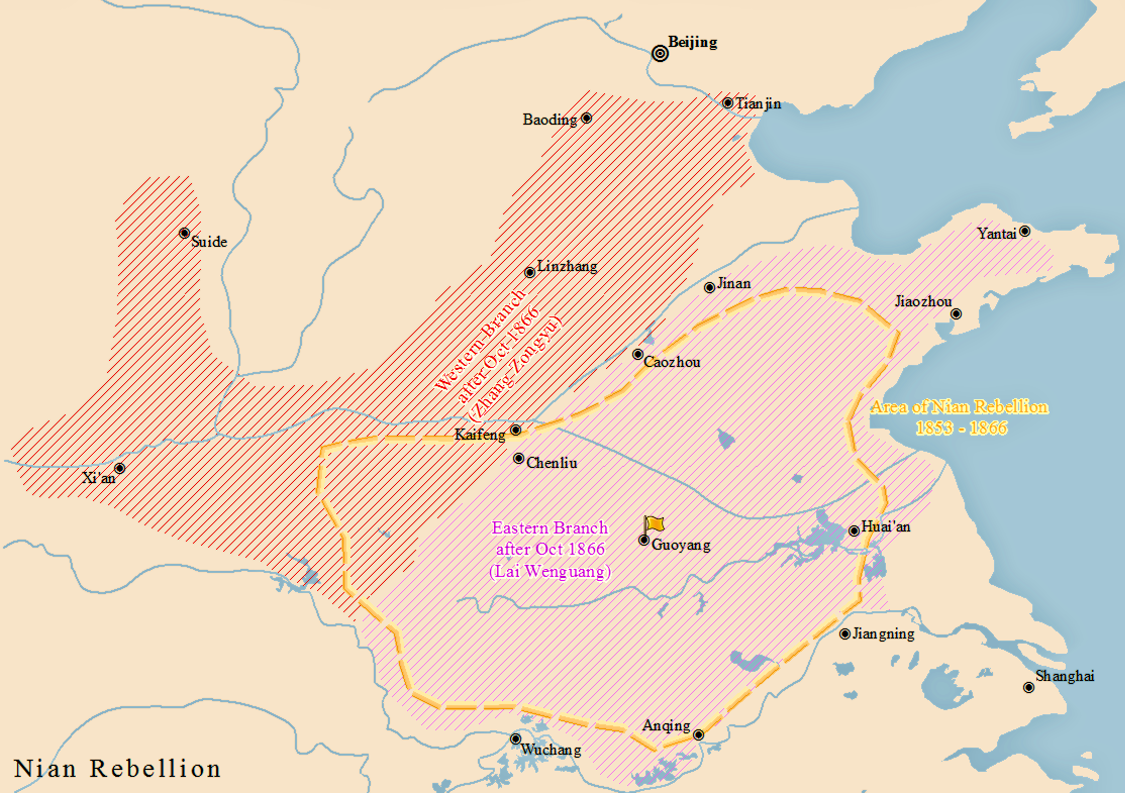
Nian Rebellion (1851–1868)

Yellow River course change in 1855

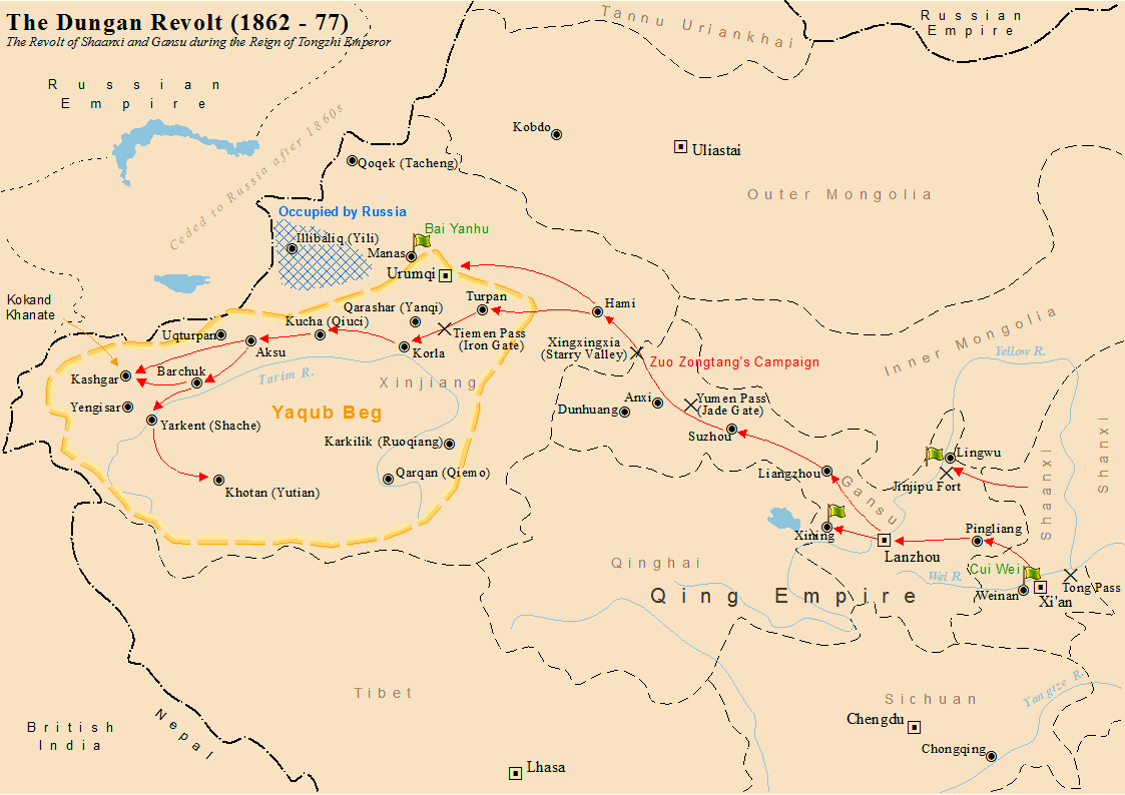
Dungan Revolt (1862–1877)

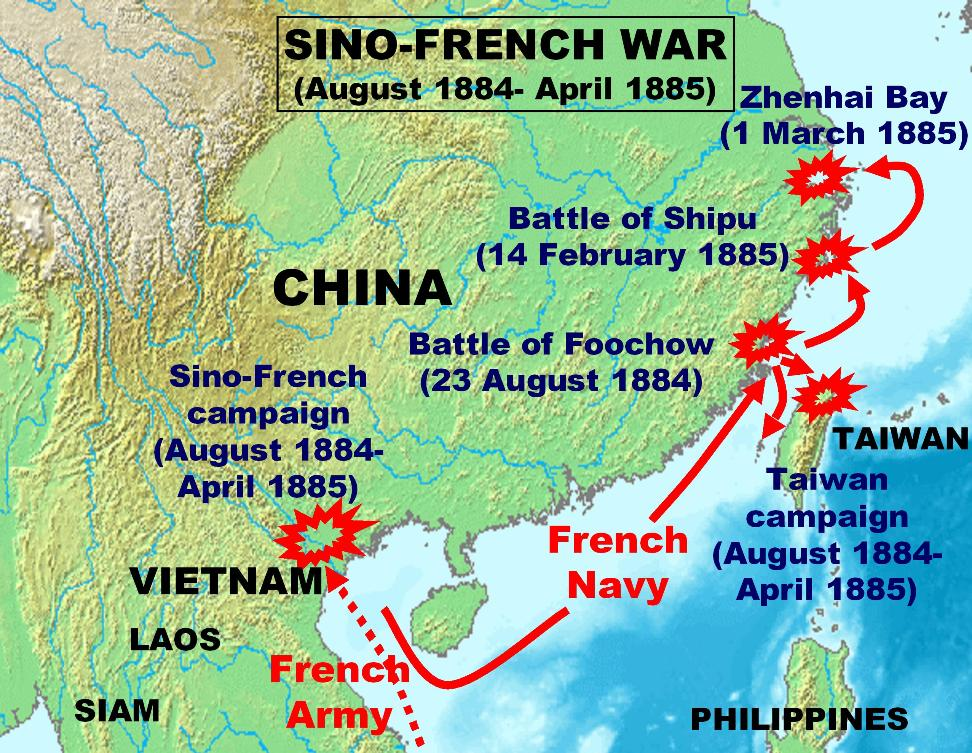
Sino-French War (1884–1885)

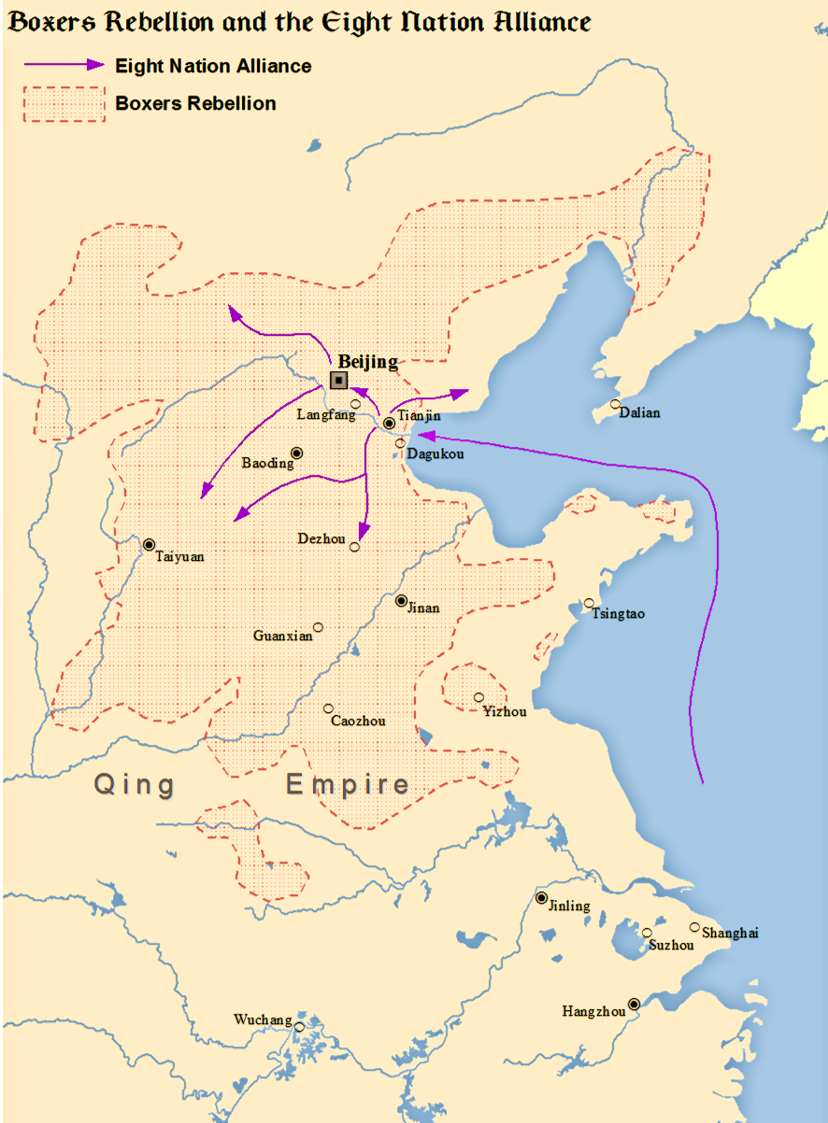
Boxer Rebellion (1900–1901)

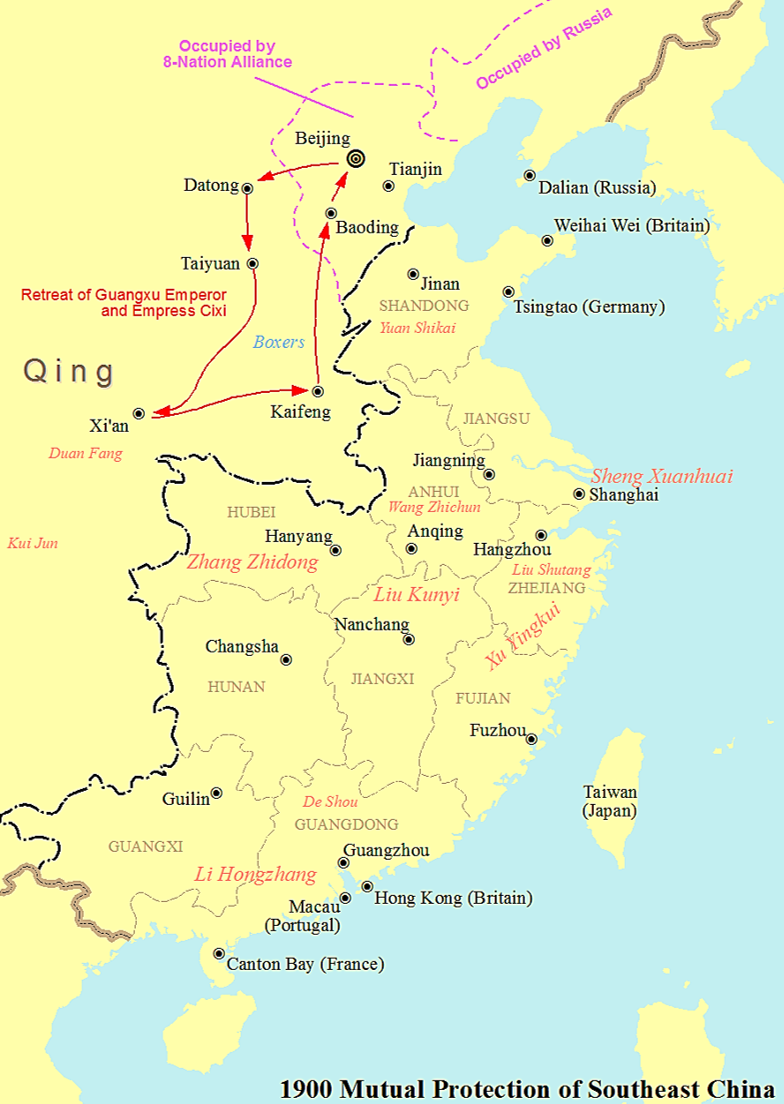
Mutual Protection of Southeast China in 1900

== Bibliography ==
- Adle, Chahryar (2003), History of Civilizations of Central Asia 5, UNESCO Publishing
- Andrade, Tonio (2008j), "Chapter 10: The Beginning of the End", How Taiwan Became Chinese: Dutch, Spanish, and Han Colonization in the Seventeenth Century, Columbia University Press
- Andrade, Tonio (2016), The Gunpowder Age: China, Military Innovation, and the Rise of the West in World History, Princeton University Press, ISBN 978-0-691-13597-7.
- Asimov, M.S. (1998), History of civilizations of Central Asia Volume IV The age of achievement: A.D. 750 to the end of the fifteenth century Part One The historical, social and economic setting, UNESCO Publishing
- Atwood, Christopher P. (2004), Encyclopedia of Mongolia and the Mongol Empire, Facts On File
- Barclay, Paul D. (2018), Outcasts of Empire: Japan's Rule on Taiwan's "Savage Border," 1874-1945, University of California Press
- Barfield, Thomas (1989), The Perilous Frontier: Nomadic Empires and China, Basil Blackwell
- Barrett, Timothy Hugh (2008), The Woman Who Discovered Printing, Great Britain: Yale University Press, ISBN 978-0-300-12728-7 (alk. paper)
- Beckwith, Christopher I. (2009), Empires of the Silk Road: A History of Central Eurasia from the Bronze Age to the Present, Princeton University Press, ISBN 978-0-691-13589-2
- Beckwith, Christopher I (1987), The Tibetan Empire in Central Asia: A History of the Struggle for Great Power among Tibetans, Turks, Arabs, and Chinese during the Early Middle Ages, Princeton University Press
- Biran, Michal (2005), The Empire of the Qara Khitai in Eurasian History: Between China and the Islamic World, Cambridge Studies in Islamic Civilization, Cambridge, England: Cambridge University Press, ISBN 0521842263
- Bregel, Yuri (2003), An Historical Atlas of Central Asia, Brill
- Chase, Kenneth (2003), Firearms: A Global History to 1700, Cambridge University Press, ISBN 0-521-82274-2.
- Christian, David (2018), A History of Russia, Central Asia, and Mongolia 2
- Crossley, Pamela Kyle (1997), The Manchus, Blackwell Publishers Ltd
- Dardess, John (2012), Ming China 1368-1644 A Concise History of A Resilient Empire, Rowman & Littlefield Publishers, Inc.
- Dmytryshyn, Basil (1985), Russia's Conquest of Siberia, Western Imprints, The Press of the Oregon Historical Society
- Dreyer, Edward L. (2007), Zheng He: China and the Oceans in the Early Ming Dynasty, 1405-1433, Pearson Longman
- Drompp, Michael Robert (2005), Tang China And The Collapse Of The Uighur Empire: A Documentary History, Brill
- Duyvendak, J.J.L. (1938), "The True Dates of the Chinese Maritime Expeditions in the Early Fifteenth Century", T'oung Pao, 34 (5): 341–413, doi:10.1163/156853238X00171
- Ebrey, Patricia Buckley (1999), The Cambridge Illustrated History of China, Cambridge: Cambridge University Press, ISBN 0-521-66991-X (paperback).
- Ebrey, Patricia Buckley; Walthall, Anne; Palais, James B. (2006), East Asia: A Cultural, Social, and Political History, Boston: Houghton Mifflin, ISBN 0-618-13384-4
- Elliott, Mark C. (2001), The Manchu Way: The Eight Banners and Ethnic Identity in Late Imperial China, Stanford University Press, ISBN 9780804746847
- Fernquest, John (2006), Crucible of War: Burma and the Ming in the Tai Frontier Zone (1382-1454)
- Geary, Norman (2003), The Kam People of China, RoutledgeCurzon
- Golden, Peter B. (1992), An Introduction to the History of the Turkic Peoples: Ethnogenesis and State-Formation in Medieval and Early Modern Eurasia and the Middle East, OTTO HARRASSOWITZ · WIESBADEN
- Graff, David A. (2002), Medieval Chinese Warfare, 300-900, Warfare and History, London: Routledge, ISBN 0415239559
- Graff, David Andrew (2016), The Eurasian Way of War Military Practice in Seventh-Century China and Byzantium, Routledge, ISBN 978-0-415-46034-7.
- Hao, Zhidong (2011), Macau History and Society, HKU Press, ISBN 9789888028542.
- Haywood, John (1998), Historical Atlas of the Medieval World, AD 600-1492, Barnes & Noble
- Jin, Dengjian (2016), The Great Knowledge Transcendence, Palgrave Macmillan
- Latourette, Kenneth Scott (1964), The Chinese, their history and culture, Volumes 1-2, Macmillan
- Lewis, James (2015), The East Asian War, 1592-1598: International Relations, Violence and Memory, Routledge
- Li, Xiaobing (2019), The History of Taiwan, Greenwood
- Liew, Foon Ming (1996), The Luchuan-Pingmian Campaigns (1436-1449) in the Light of Official Chinese Historiography
- Lorge, Peter A. (2008), The Asian Military Revolution: from Gunpowder to the Bomb, Cambridge University Press, ISBN 978-0-521-60954-8
- Luttwak, Edward N. (2009), The Grand Strategy of the Byzantine Empire, The Belknap Press of Harvard University Press
- Mills, J.V.G. (1970), Ying-yai Sheng-lan: 'The Overall Survey of the Ocean's Shores' [1433], Cambridge: Cambridge University Press
- Millward, James (2009), Eurasian Crossroads: A History of Xinjiang, Columbia University Press
- Ming, Liew Foon (1996), The Luchuan-Pingmian Campaigns (1436-1449) in the Light of Official Chinese Historiography
- Mote, F. W. (2003), Imperial China: 900–1800, Harvard University Press, ISBN 978-0674012127
- Narangoa, Li (2014), Historical Atlas of Northeast Asia, 1590-2010: Korea, Manchuria, Mongolia, Eastern Siberia, New York: Columbia University Press, ISBN 9780231160704
- Needham, Joseph (1986), Science & Civilisation in China, vol. V:7: The Gunpowder Epic, Cambridge University Press, ISBN 0-521-30358-3
- Rhoads, Edward J.M. (2000), Manchus & Han: Ethnic Relations and Political Power in Late Qing and Early Republican China, 1861-1928, University of Washington Press
- Rong, Xinjiang (2013), Eighteen Lectures on Dunhuang, Brill
- Schafer, Edward H. (1985), The Golden Peaches of Samarkand: A study of T'ang Exotics, University of California Press
- Shaban, M. A. (1979), The ʿAbbāsid Revolution, Cambridge: Cambridge University Press, ISBN 0-521-29534-3
- Sinor, Denis (1990), The Cambridge History of Early Inner Asia, Volume 1, Cambridge University Press
- Sima, Guang (2015), Bóyángbǎn Zīzhìtōngjiàn 54 huánghòu shīzōng 柏楊版資治通鑑54皇后失蹤, Yuǎnliú chūbǎnshìyè gǔfèn yǒuxiàn gōngsī, ISBN 978-957-32-0876-1
- Skaff, Jonathan Karam (2012), Sui-Tang China and Its Turko-Mongol Neighbors: Culture, Power, and Connections, 580-800 (Oxford Studies in Early Empires), Oxford University Press
- Standaert, Nicolas (2022), The Chinese Gazette in European Sources, Brill
- Standen, Naomi (2007), Unbounded Loyalty Frontier Crossings in Liao China, University of Hawai'i Press
- Steinhardt, Nancy Shatzman (1997), Liao Architecture, University of Hawaii Press
- Swope, Kenneth M. (2009), A Dragon's Head and a Serpent's Tail: Ming China and the First Great East Asian War, 1592-1598, University of Oklahoma Press.
- Swope, Kenneth (2014), The Military Collapse of China's Ming Dynasty, Routledge
- Twitchett, Denis C. (1979), The Cambridge History of China, Vol. 3, Sui and T'ang China, 589–906, Cambridge University Press
- Twitchett, Denis (1994), "The Liao", The Cambridge History of China, Volume 6, Alien Regime and Border States, 907-1368, Cambridge: Cambridge University Press, pp. 43–153, ISBN 0521243319
- Twitchett, Denis (1998), The Cambridge History of China Volume 7 The Ming Dynasty, 1368—1644, Part I, Cambridge University Press
- Twitchett, Denis (1998b), The Cambridge History of China Volume 8 The Ming Dynasty, 1368—1644, Part 2, Cambridge University Press
- Twitchett, Denis (2002), The Cambridge History of China 9 Volume 1
- Twitchett, Denis (2009), The Cambridge History of China Volume 5 The Sung dynasty and its Predecessors, 907-1279, Cambridge University Press
- Wakeman, Frederic (1985), The Great Enterprise: The Manchu Reconstruction of Imperial Order in Seventeenth-Century China, vol. 1, University of California Press
- Wang, Zhenping (2013), Tang China in Multi-Polar Asia: A History of Diplomacy and War, University of Hawaii Press
- Wilkinson, Endymion (2012), Chinese History: A New Manual, Harvard University Asia Center for the Harvard-Yenching Institute
- Wilkinson, Endymion (2015). Chinese History: A New Manual, 4th edition. Cambridge, MA: Harvard University Asia Center distributed by Harvard University Press. ISBN 9780674088467.
- Wills, John E. (2011), China and Maritime Europe, 1500–1800: Trade, Settlement, Diplomacy, and Missions, Cambridge University Press.
- Wong, Young-tsu (2017), China's Conquest of Taiwan in the Seventeenth Century: Victory at Full Moon, Springer
- Wong, Tin (2022), Approaching Sovereignty over the Diaoyu Islands, Springer
- Xiong, Victor Cunrui (2000), Sui-Tang Chang'an: A Study in the Urban History of Late Medieval China (Michigan Monographs in Chinese Studies), U OF M CENTER FOR CHINESE STUDIES, ISBN 0892641371
- Xiong, Victor Cunrui (2009), Historical Dictionary of Medieval China, United States of America: Scarecrow Press, Inc., ISBN 978-0810860537
- Xu, Elina-Qian (2005), HISTORICAL DEVELOPMENT OF THE PRE-DYNASTIC KHITAN, Institute for Asian and African Studies 7
- Xue, Zongzheng (1992), Turkic peoples, 中国社会科学出版社
- Yuan, Shu (2001), Bóyángbǎn Tōngjiàn jìshìběnmò 28 dìèrcìhuànguánshídài 柏楊版通鑑記事本末28第二次宦官時代, Yuǎnliú chūbǎnshìyè gǔfèn yǒuxiàn gōngsī, ISBN 957-32-4273-7
- Yule, Henry (1915), Cathay and the Way Thither: Being a Collection of Medieval Notices of China, Vol I: Preliminary Essay on the Intercourse Between China and the Western Nations Previous to the Discovery of the Cape Route, Hakluyt Society
- Zhang, Yufa (1998), Zhonghua Minguo shigao 中華民國史稿, Taipei, Taiwan: Lian jing (聯經), ISBN 957-08-1826-3.
