= Yu Huijiao =

- Occupation: Chairman
- Employer: Shanghai YTO Express
- Spouse(s): Chinese: 张小娟; pinyin: Zhāng Xiǎojuān

Yu Huijiao (Chinese: 喻会蛟; pinyin: Yù Huìjiāo) is the founder and chairman of YTO Express (Chinese: 圆通快递), a Chinese express courier service.

== Career ==
After the failure of his architecture firm, Yu founded a courier service to help pay his bankruptcy bills. Initially, he and his wife had 15 employees who delivered packages by bicycle in Tonglu County, near Hangzhou. As of 2017, YTO Express employs over 22 thousand people across mainland China and Hong Kong, with an annual net income of 1.4 billion RMB (~US$213 million). Yu remains chairman of the company.

According to Forbes, Yu is personally worth US$3.4 billion as of 2017; however, the combined wealth of his immediate family is US$7.5 billion. Forbes listed Yu's wife, Zhang Xiaojuan (Chinese: 张小娟), as the 12th richest self-made female billionaire in the world.
