= Zhejiang Tonglu High School =

School in Hangzhou, China

Zhejiang Tonglu High School (浙江省桐庐中学) is a high school in Tonglu, Hangzhou, China. It was founded in 1941. In 2016 it had 2,048 students and 218 teachers. It has 293 mǔ or 20 hectares.
