= Battle of Shen-Liao =

1621 battle between Later Jin and Ming

- Part of the Ming-Qing transition
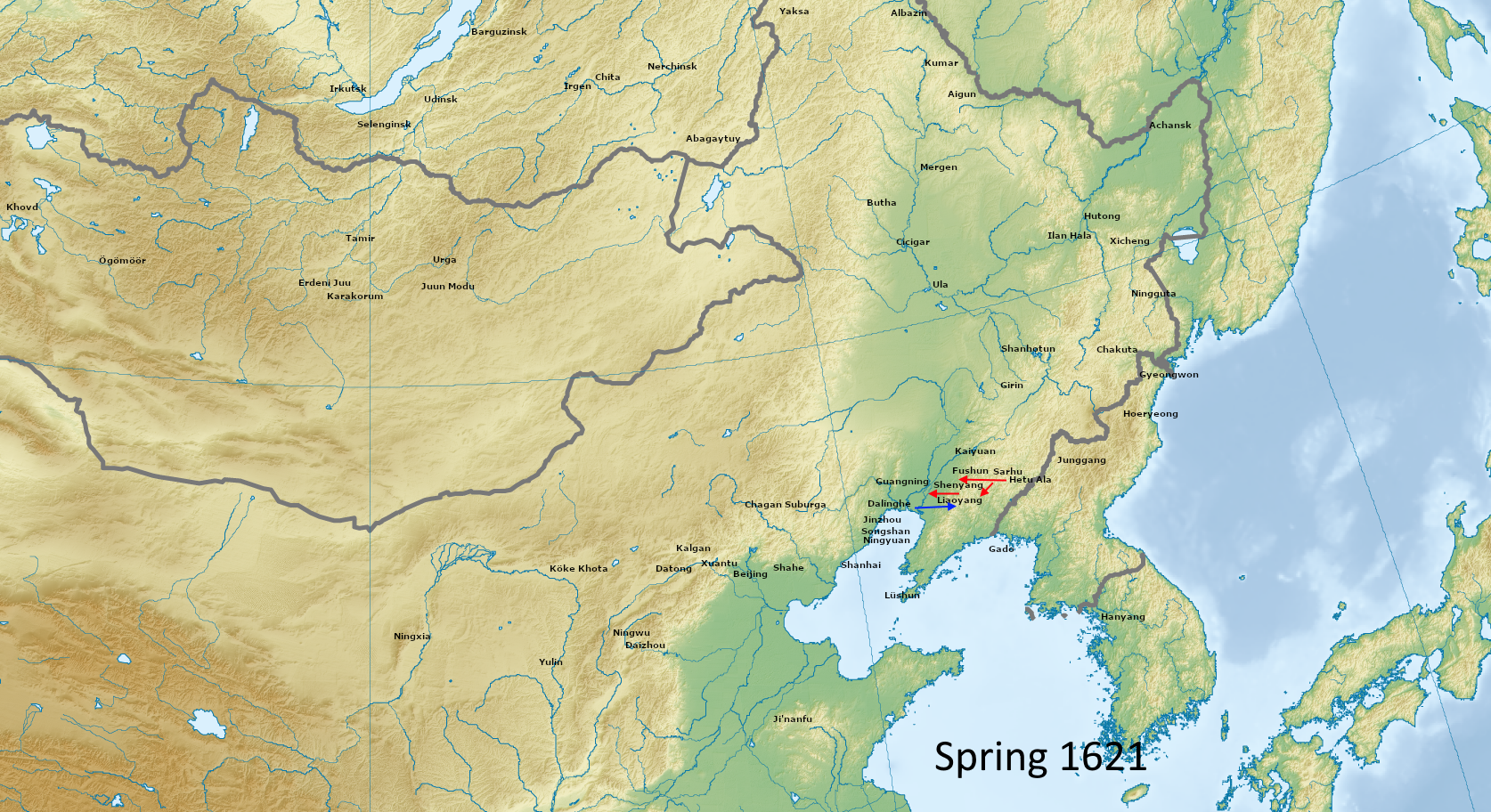
Date	Spring 1621
Location	Liaodong, China 40°00′N 122°30′E
Result	Later Jin victory

Belligerents
Later Jin	Ming dynasty

Commanders and leaders
Nurhaci; Daišan; Li Yongfang	He Shixian †; You Shigong †; Yuan Yingtai †; Li Bingchen †; Chen Ce †

Strength
Unknown	Unknown

Casualties and losses
Unknown	~70,000

The Battle of Shen-Liao， also known as Battle of Hun River was a military conflict between the Later Jin and the Ming dynasty. In early 1621 Nurhaci, the Jurchen khan of the Later Jin, invaded Liaodong and captured the cities of Shenyang and Liaoyang from the Ming.

== Background ==
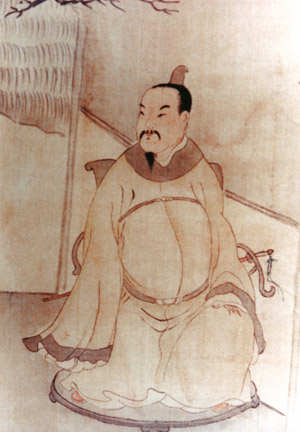
Xiong Tingbi

After taking the city of Xicheng from his last Jurchen rivals, the Yihe clan of Haixi Jurchens, Nurhaci and his advisers started planning the conquest of Shenyang to make it the new capital of Later Jin. In preparation for the coming battles Nurhaci began heavily courting nearby Mongol tribes, whose chieftains, and even Ming officers, defected to his banner. Defectors were rewarded with lands, titles, farms, slaves, livestock, and cash according to their ranks and contributions to the war effort. Nurhaci emphasized the Mongols especially that the Ming were their common foe, and that the Jurchens and Mongols shared a similar Central Asian origin. The rest of 1619 was spent sealing alliances with ritual feasts, even as Jin lands were suffering from famine. Nurhaci's overtures were not met with success everywhere, and Ligdan Khan killed Jin's envoys. Some Mongol tribes turned to the Ming.

The Ming court appointed Xiong Tingbi as Military Affairs Commissioner of Liaodong. Xiong's strategy was to further strengthen Ming defenses and to soothe the worries of the people. His rationale was that so long as the people of Liao understood their importance as protected subjects of Ming, they would refrain from joining the Jin. Xiong emphasized the need for Ming subjects to feel valued if they were to contribute to the war effort. One of his first actions after taking office was to immediately punish deserters. A pair of Ming commanders along with Li Ruzhen, who had fled from the Battle of Tieling, were captured and executed.

Xiong estimated that Nurhaci had around 100,000 troops at his command while there were nominally 180,000 Ming soldiers in the Liaodong region. However, from his personal inspections, Xiong deduced that only 90,000 troops were available in Liaodong, and of those a great portion were unfit for service. To fund the rejuvenation of the northeastern military command, Xiong requested a disbursement of 1.2 million taels from the Ministry of Revenue. The Ministry promised 400,000 taels and delivered only 100,000. After much badgering and condemnation by Xiong, the Minister of War suggested that it might be possible to dip into funds usually allocated to local regions, as well as raise contributions from the noble houses, aboriginal chieftains, and regular bureaucrats. Eventually Xiong received a total disbursement of 600,000 taels.

With half the funds he had requested, Xiong set out to build war carts, manufacture firearms, and repair moats and walls. The Ministry of War was tasked with producing 4,500 cannons. Roughly 37,000 carts worth of supplies pulled by 74,000 oxen arrived in Liaodong during the winter of 1619. In addition to the 1.2 million taels Xiong had requested, he also advocated for the relocation of 180,000 troops from other regions to Liaodong to man a defensive line stretching from Fushun to Fort Zhenjiang. This was approved by the court, which sent orders for troop transfers to be carried out. The order was met with considerable difficulties. In one instance the troops that had been assigned to Fort Zhenjiang, numbering 17,400 men, mutinied.

Xiong believed that it was unwise to defend Shenyang between the Liao and Hun River, which although a major city, was located on empty land and therefore more vulnerable to attack. Others argued that it could not be lightly abandoned.

Xiong Tingbi's plans were attacked by an official hailing from the south by the name of Yang Sichang. Yang argued that Xiong's plans were unreliable and costly, especially regarding the transportation of Sichuanese soldiers all the way to the northeastern frontier. To carry out all of Xiong's plans, Yang suggested that it was not 1.2 million taels that were needed, but 10 million taels, taken straight from the imperial Taicang vault. The Wanli Emperor ignored Yang's suggestion to draw funds from the Taicang vault, and raised taxes in early 1620 in the hopes of increasing revenues to 5.2 million taels. The tax increase was not carried out evenly across the empire. Some places, such as Guizhou, saw no increase at all, while others took on most of the burden.

Recognizing that Ming's only advantage over the Jin was firepower, Xiong opted not to take an aggressive stance, and simply fortified and rebuilt fortress walls and moats. Xiong hoped that by gradually improving defensive positions in Liaodong, Ming could regain lost ground without engaging the Jin in open battles. During Xiong's tenure security returned to Liaodong and many refugees were able to return home. Commerce picked up and Jin attacks decreased significantly. However the military strengthening effort ground to a halt when Shandong was struck by famine and the court was forced to reduce taxes. Ming troops were constantly hampered by a lack of supplies and rations as the Jin carried out raids on grain stores.

The Wanli Emperor died on 18 August 1620 and the Taichang Emperor succeeded him. Taichang immediately released one million taels to fund the Liaodong defense, but at that point the official Li Ruhua estimated that a sum of 1.6 million taels would be needed to properly supply the eastern army. The Ministry of Revenue gave an even grimmer estimation of 3.2 million taels, and perhaps even 4 million taels after accounting for wastage. The military strengthening of Liaodong had also taken a toll on the capital defenses, which fell from 200,000 to 120,000 soldiers. Unfortunately for Xiong Tingbi, the change in leadership also brought new problems in the form of court slandering of his accomplishments. Liu Guojin, who had been impeached by Xiong for recruiting the soldiers that mutinied at Fort Zhenjiang, had started a faction and plot to slander Xiong of losing territory and cowardice in battle, both of which Xiong denied. Eventually Xiong decided to quit before he was arrested, and resigned from his position as Military Affairs Commissioner.

Yang Sichang took on the task of calculating revenues and affairs for Liaodong. He estimated that Liaodong's 177,00 troops and 100,000 mounts costed the court roughly 3.7 million taels per year. To offset these costs, he suggested establishing military farms so that at least the horses could be fed on local feed. Yang also recommended introducing a new pay scale based on the grade of soldiers to better motivate them as well as to reduce costs. Soldiers were divided into five classes, and the highest class earned 2.5 times what the lowest class made.

The Taichang Emperor died of bad diarrhea a month after assuming office, and the Tianqi Emperor succeeded him. Yuan Yingtai was promoted to Military Affairs Commissioner of Liaodong and assumed an aggressive posture towards the Jin. Unlike his predecessor, Yuan wished to court the Mongols and add their strength to the Ming army. He believed that with the Mongols' aid, not only would they be able to protect Liaodong, they could actually invade the Later Jin and end the threat once and for all. According to Yuan, Mongols were essentially "free crack cavalry." While some factions were highly skeptical of this view, the attraction of decisive action won out in the end, and the Tianqi Emperor disbursed 3 million taels to persuade the Mongols to come to their side.

== Course of battle ==
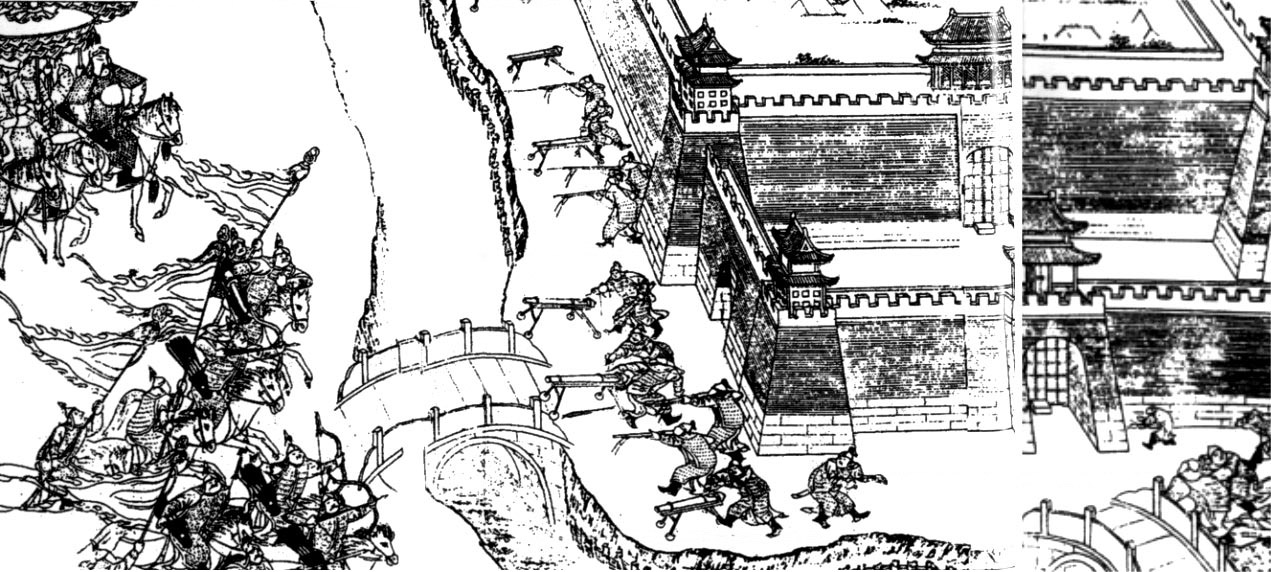
Battle of Liaoyang, 1621.

In early 1621 the Jin attacked the Liaodong region and took the fortress of Fengjibao near Shenyang. Nurhaci attacked with all Eight Banners. Fengjibao's commander, Li Bingchen, sallied forth with 200 soldiers to meet the enemy in open battle. One banner proceeded to attack Li's troops, who managed to kill a Jin officer with cannon fire before retreating. Nurhaci pulled back his troops out of the range of Ming cannons and camped near Fengjibao. Ming scouts tried to spy on Jin camps that night, but were captured and executed. The next day Li tried to engage the Jin army again with 2,000 troops. The battle ended in complete defeat for Li and the Jin took Fengjibao.

From Fengjibao the Jin army advanced towards Shenyang. When they reached the banks of the Hun River, they erected defenses and made camp.

The commanders of Shenyang, He Shixian and You Shigong, had dug moats and erected palisades around Shenyang. Cannons and firearms were deployed. Not wanting to meet Ming firepower head on, Nurhaci opted to conduct raids on the city's outskirts and pillage the surrounding area in the hope that Shenyang's defenders would sortie out and meet them in the open field. The tactic went well and He Shixian led a contingent of 1,000 soldiers to meet the Jin in battle. They were quickly surrounded and forced to fight their way to the west gate of the city, but were unable to enter. He Shixian died in combat as four arrows pierced his body. You Shigong tried to save him but his troops were defeated as well. You died in combat. With the two commanders dead, Shenyang's defenses fell apart and the Jin quickly took the city.

Nurhaci then left to intercept a Ming relief contingent at the Hun River. Ming commander Chen Ce's heavy pikemen were flanked by Jin cavalry and driven into the river where they drowned. The remaining Ming troops rallied and engaged 200 Jin soldiers, who retreated. Nurhaci's son Daišan attacked the Ming column and broke their morale. The Jin army then chased Ming troops for a distance before returning to Shenyang.

Meanwhile, a Ming army of 50,000 had been dispatched and was on its way to besiege Shenyang. News of this reached Nurhaci, who rushed his banners out to confront the Ming before they could entrench themselves around the city. Taken by surprise, the Ming army was only able to fire their guns once before the Jin cavalry was upon them. The Jin cavalry caught them in a pincer attack, collapsing one side then another, until the entire army broke. They chased the scattered remnants for a time before regrouping. Next Nurhaci intercepted another army from Liaoyang and defeated it in quick succession.

Seeing that Ming defenses had disintegrated, Nurhaci proceeded to invade Liaoyang, where Yuan Yingtai was headquartered. First Nurhaci directed one banner to cut off the city's water supply and another to begin sapping the east wall. Nurhaci's own banners began constructing siege works. Ming forces rushed out with 30,000 soldiers and fired their guns at the Jin, who engaged them in open combat, suffering heavy casualties. The Ming army was able to repulse Jin advances until they ran out of ammunition, after which they were routed. The Jin left wing took the Wujing Gate and severed the bridge, cutting off the broken Ming retreat. Scattered Ming soldiers were driven towards the city moat where they drowned.

Jin siege carts began moving towards the city. Scaling ladders were erected and the city was assaulted on all sides. The Ming defenders had run out of gunpowder after their gunpowder stores were hit by Li Yongfang's cannoneers. Finally morale broke as two walls fell to the Jin. As Yuan Yingtai saw this he set his watchtower on fire, committing suicide. Ming's Mongol allies who were present were too busy looting the city to do any fighting and fled soon after the Ming army was defeated. Following Yuan's example the other Ming officers committed suicide as well.

The victorious Jin were reportedly welcomed into the city with cries of joy.

After the capture of Shenyang and Liaoyang, Ming reinforcements from the south arrived, but by then the Jin had already occupied all the forts east of the Liao River. Skirmishes were fought between the new Ming troops and the banners. Small victories were had by the Ming, who killed 3,000 Jin troops in one engagement, but were forced to concede defeat and retreat after they ran out of gunpowder.

== Aftermath ==
Nurhaci moved the Later Jin capital to Liaoyang. To smooth the transition of the region, Nurhaci released Ming officials who had been jailed for opposing the Jin as a sign of goodwill, and their previous posts prior to the invasion were restored to them, only this time serving under the Jin. Orders were given not to loot from the commoners, and for the most part, the strict discipline of the Jin army made the occupation less painful than it could have been. Nurhaci celebrated the victory near his new capital and bestowed rewards upon his followers. Defections from Mongol and Ming subjects increased.

Letters were written to Joseon to pressure their king into renouncing allegiance with the Ming.

The Ming court appointed Xue Guoyong as Vice Minister of War and Military Affairs Commissioner of Liaodong. Wang Huazhen was appointed Vice Censor-in-Chief of the Right and Touring Pacification Commissioner of Guangning. The Ministry of War began recruiting mercenaries from all over China to supplement their forces. The war in Liaodong had impoverished thousands who fled south seeking refuge. Shandong in particular was hit hard and local officials complained of the unrest that followed. The people of Liaodong had a bad reputation for being shifty and untrustworthy, and their influx in neighboring regions exacerbated already limited resources. Some also fled to Korea and islands in the Bohai Sea, where they were often subject to depredations from Ming soldiers.

Ming defenses moved back to the west bank of the Liao River and the city of Guangning became the new headquarters. Xiong Tingbi was also called back into service. Xiong reiterated that the best strategy was to remain on defense. Not only that, Ming had to focus on securing naval security and attacking the Jin from the coast. Plans for the construction of a fleet were sent to Tianjin. Xiong requested 300,000 soldiers to man the defenses. The court estimated that it was possible to pull together maybe 260,000. However, none of the requested troops came to fruition, and money and supplies were sent instead.

Xiong and the supply distributor, Wang Zaijin, came to blows and were unable to work together due to differences of strategy. Wang wished to spread out troops along the entire frontier while Xiong regarded the defense of Guangning as the most realistic course of action. Wang won out in the end.

== See also ==
- Timeline of the Ming dynasty
- Timeline of the Qing dynasty

== Bibliography ==
- Swope, Kenneth (2014), The Military Collapse of China's Ming Dynasty, Routledge
- Wakeman, Frederic (1985), The Great Enterprise: The Manchu Reconstruction of Imperial Order in Seventeenth-Century China, vol. 1, University of California Press
