= Battle of Fushun =

Military conflict in Fushun, China

- Part of the Ming–Qing transition
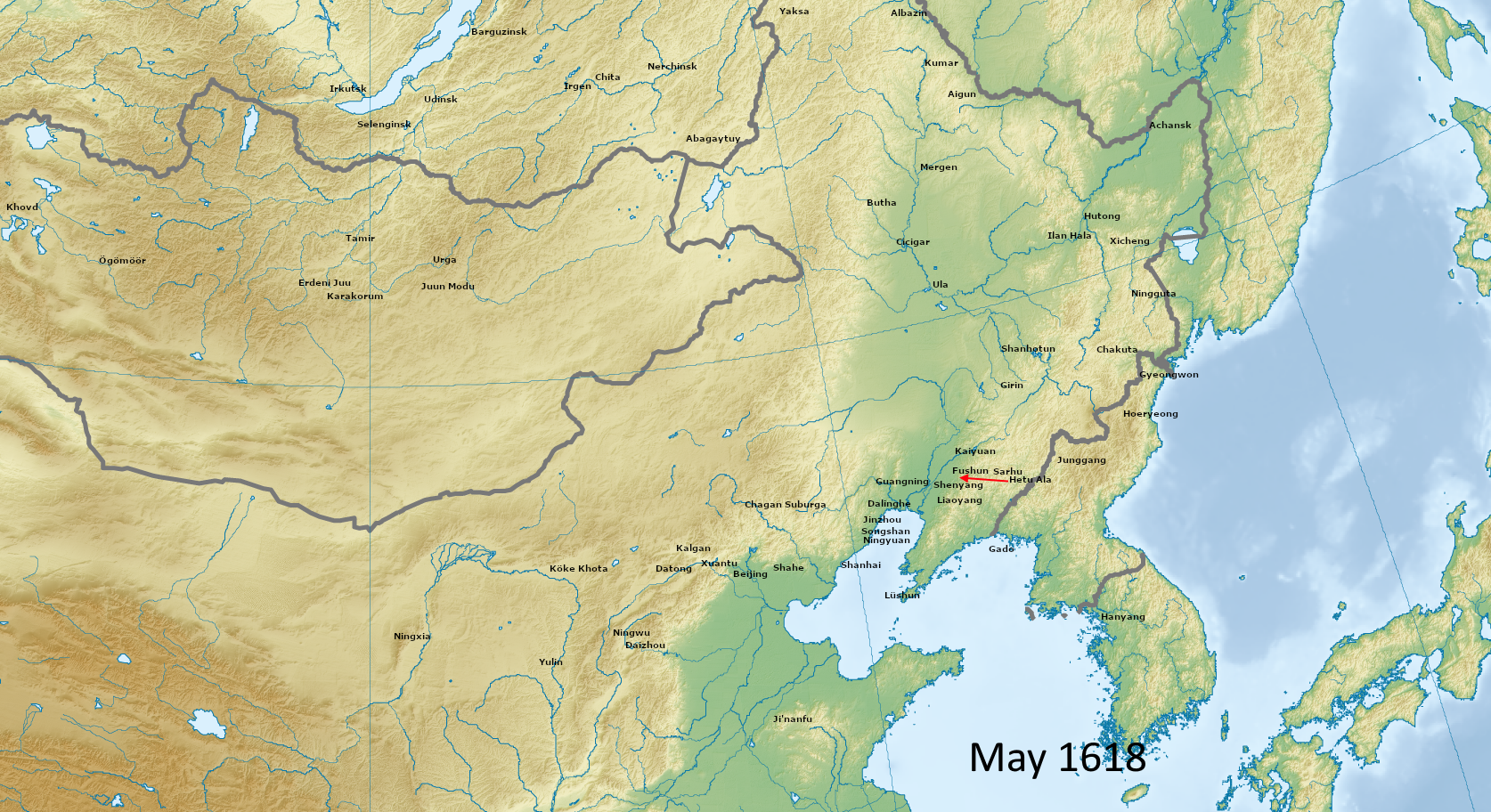
| Date | 7 May 1618 – 15 May 1618 |
| Location | Fushun, China |
| Result | Later Jin victory |

Belligerents
| Later Jin dynasty | Ming dynasty |

Commanders and leaders
| Nurhaci; Hong Taiji; Daišan | Li Yongfang (surrendered); Zhao Yipeng (surrendered); Zhang Chengyin † |

Strength
| 20,000 | Li Yongfang: 1,200; Zhang Chengyin: 10,000 |

Casualties and losses
| Few | Li Yongfang: 590; Zhang Chengying: 8,000 |

The Battle of Fushun (Chinese: 撫順之戰) was the first military conflict in the war between the Later Jin dynasty and the Ming dynasty, occurring in 1618 in Fushun. The battle ended in a decisive victory for the Later Jin and resulted in the capture of Fushun and two other nearby fortresses.

== Background ==
The Jin khan Nurhaci was motivated to attack Fushun due to his grievances with Ming policies toward Jurchen tribes and heavy rains that had ruined the crops of his people, causing impending starvation. Military action against the Ming dynasty had been planned by Nurhaci for several years, and its initial success was the culmination of years of effort and planning. Nurhaci's preparations included establishing military farms to raise soldiers and supplies, distributing cattle to increase agricultural output, and cutting down trees to build siege weapons and buildings. By attacking Ming, Nurhaci hoped to consolidate his position as khan among the recently assimilated Jurchen tribes such as the Haixi Jurchens.

Fushun, located on the Hun River about 10 kilometers east of Shenyang, was one of 18 key fortresses established in Liaodong by the Ming founder, the Hongwu Emperor. Fushun was targeted because of its close location to the Jin capital Hetu Ala, and also because it was isolated and less-well protected than other Ming fortresses. Its commander, Li Yongfang, was a mid-ranking commandant with only about 1,200 men under his command. Nurhaci was also familiar with the terrain and administration of Fushun since as a Ming tributary, he had traded there in the past. He knew that while Ming strength in the region was nominally 90,000, military administration had been lax, the quality of soldiers was poor, and salaries and rations had gone unpaid for several months. In strategic terms, Fushun made for a good springboard for a Jin assault.

== Course of battle ==
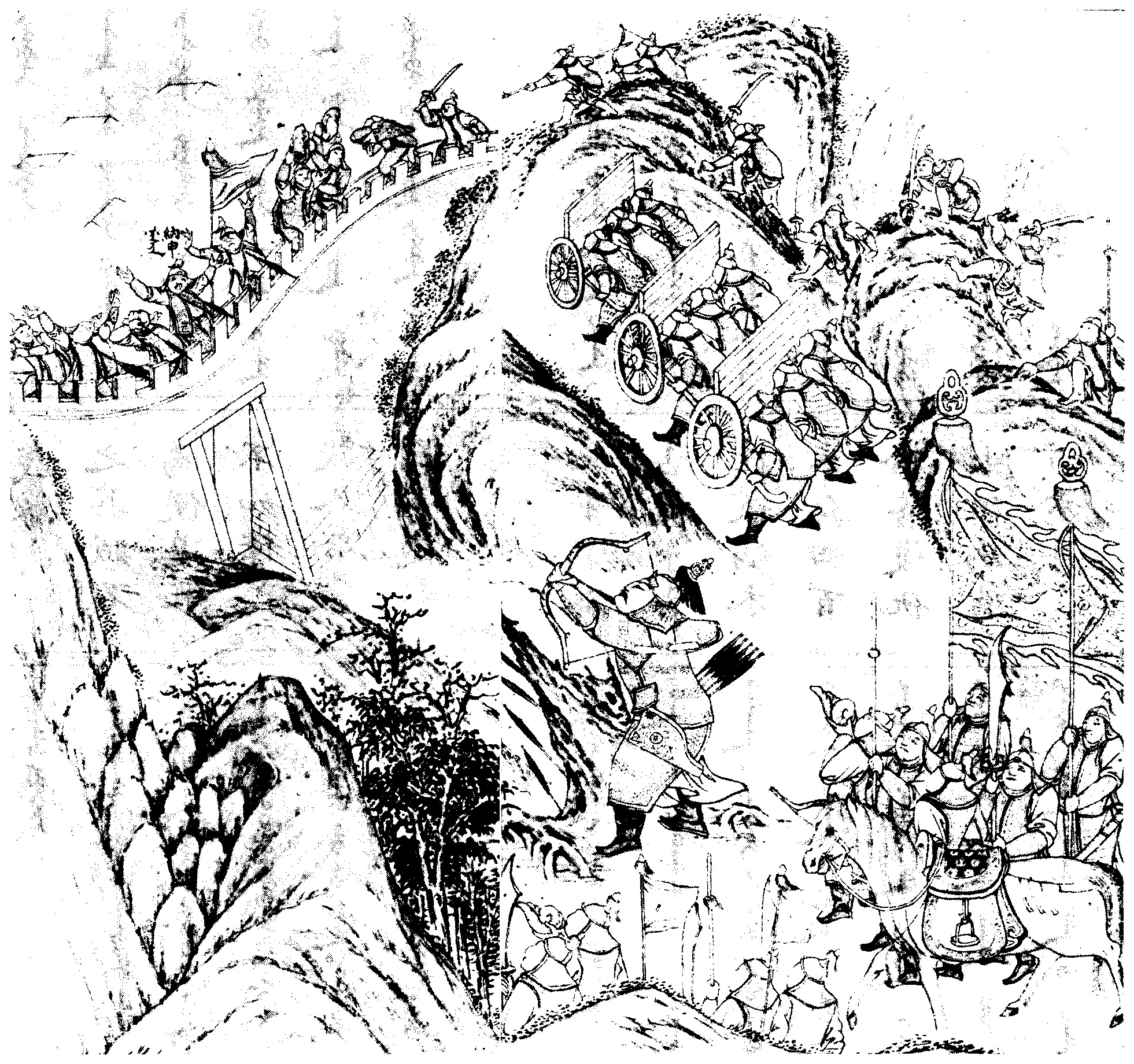
Nurhaci attacking a city wall

On 7 May, Nurhaci proclaimed his Seven Grievances against the Ming and departed his capital of Hetu Ala with 20,000 men. The Jin army was met with heavy rains which hampered their movement but they were still able to make quick progress and arrived at Fushun on the 9th. A letter was delivered to the city explaining that the Jurchens were there because "your Ming country helped the Yehe." The letter stated:

If there is a battle then the arrows shot by our soldiers will strike all in sight. If you are hit, you will surely die. Your strength cannot withstand. Even though you die in battle, there is no profit. If you come out and surrender, our soldiers will not enter the city. The soldiers attached to you will be given complete protection. But suppose our soldiers do attack and enter. The old and young inside the city will surely be in jeopardy, your official salaries will be taken away and your ranks will soon be reduced [for losing the battle]... If you submit without fighting I will not change your great doro (guiding principles; Ch., li yi) at all. I will let you live just as you did before. I will promote not only the people with great knowledge and foresight but also many other people, give them daughters in marriage and care for them. I will give you a higher position than you have and treat you like one of my officials of the first degree.

The Jin army assailed the city walls with siege ladders and the unprepared garrison gave their lives in a hasty defense. Li Yongfang and his lieutenant, Zhao Yipeng, decided to surrender on the condition that no one was to be harmed. Nurhaci agreed to the terms and entered the city. Li was made a commander in the Jin army and granted a granddaughter of Nurhaci as his concubine for his role in minimizing Jin losses. Li would be the first in a series of Ming defections.

Nurhaci left 4,000 men to hold Fushun while he took the remaining army to capture two nearby fortresses, which fell in quick succession. Meanwhile, news of the loss of Fushun had reached Ming on the 12th and a relief contingent of 10,000 under Zhang Chengyin was dispatched to retake the city. The Ming army arrived on the 15th and immediately set up three camps, dug trenches, and began bombarding the city with cannon fire. However Nurhaci's sons Hong Taiji and Daišan sallied forth and routed the Ming forces, dealing heavy casualties.

The victorious Jin army returned to Hetu Ala on the 20th.

== Aftermath ==
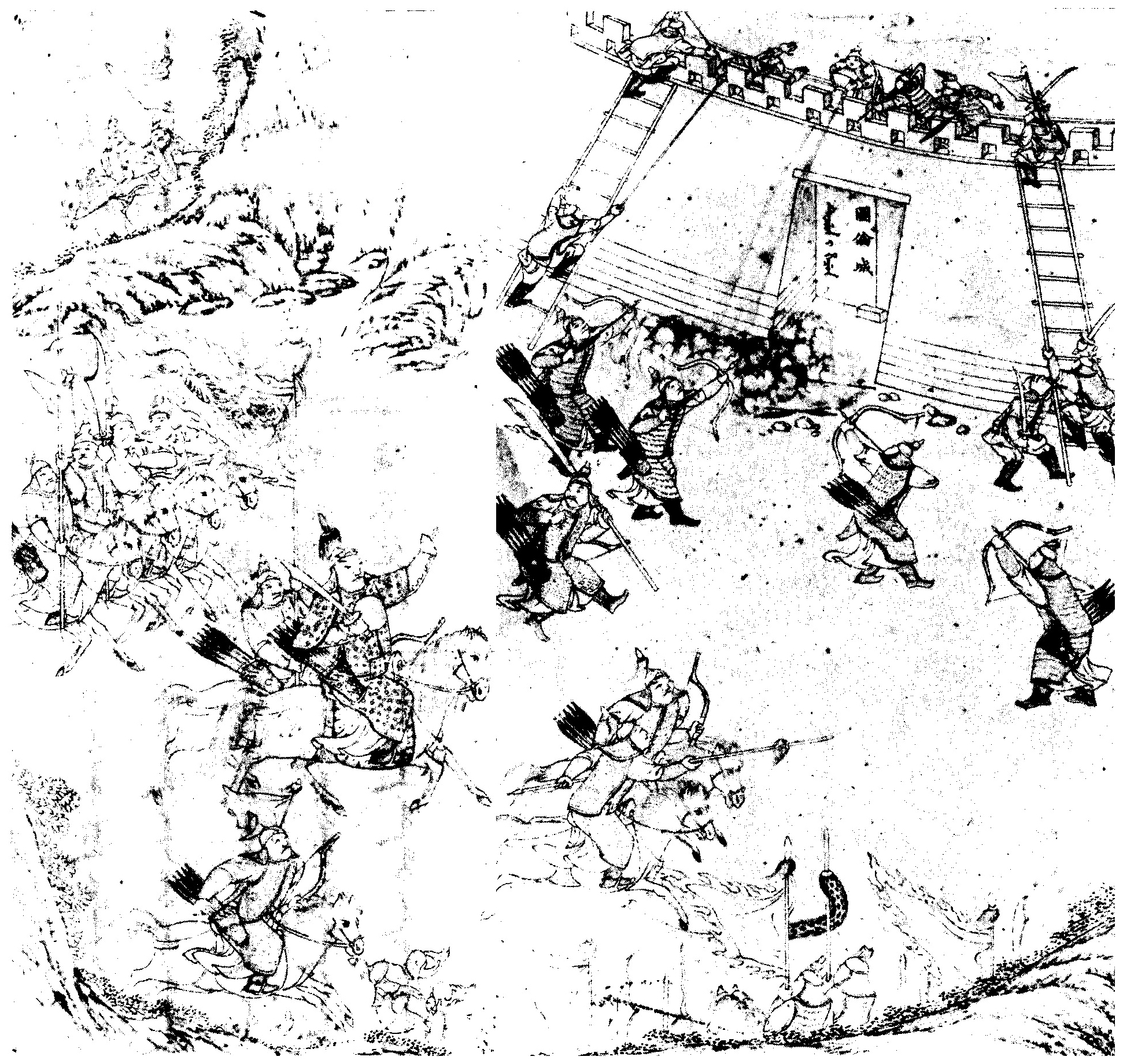
Nurhaci's army assaulting the city of Tulun

Li Yongfang later fought as a lieutenant-general at the side of Nurhaci and participated in the Later Jin invasion of Joseon. Although spared and given privileged status as one of the first to defect, Li lost Nurhaci's confidence in 1622 when he opposed the khan's desire to massacre any Chinese refugees who sought to escape his rule. Despite this, Li remained ambivalent towards Ming overtures trying to re-enlist him in their army. Li Yongfang died in 1634 with the rank of viscount. All nine of his sons continued to provide service to the imperial throne.

In response to Jin aggression, the Wanli Emperor made Li Rubai Commander of Liaodong, and Yang Hao the Military Affairs Commissioner. These two had previously served as commanders in the Ming army during the Japanese invasions of Korea (1592–98), but their lackluster performance during the war had resulted in demotions. Hence Wanli's selection was at once understandable for choosing veterans, but also complicated by their careers. Furthermore, Li Rubai's father Li Chengliang had once served as Nurhaci's surrogate father, after Nurhaci's own father had been killed during a conflict for the leadership of the Jianzhou Jurchens.

Two other military commanders, Du Song and Liu Ting, were also ordered to hasten to the northeastern frontier.

The Ming court hoped to raise enough resources to amass a force of 130,000 for a punitive expedition against the Later Jin. The Ministry of War released 200,000 taels of silver for recruitment of soldiers. The Court of the Imperial Stud released 60,000 taels to purchase war horses. The Ming court was also intent on building new ships for military transportation, but ran into a lack of funds in the Ming capital, and were forced to requisition supplies from Nanjing, the secondary capital.

Problems with military administration such as unpaid salaries and a lack of funds were also presented to Wanli by Acting Minister of War Bi Sancai. Bi hoped that Wanli would dip into his own personal funds to finance the war effort, which required five times more than what the Ministry of War could raise on their own. Wanli responded by saying that the imperial coffers were empty.

== See also ==
- Timeline of the Ming dynasty
- Timeline of the Qing dynasty

== Bibliography ==
- Swope, Kenneth (2014), The Military Collapse of China's Ming Dynasty, Routledge
- Wakeman, Frederic (1985), The Great Enterprise: The Manchu Reconstruction of Imperial Order in Seventeenth-Century China, vol. 1, University of California Press
