= Fenshui Township, Tonglu =

Town in Tonglu County, Zhejiang, China

Coordinates: 29°55′54″N 119°25′52″E

Fenshui Township (分水镇) is a township from the Tonglu County.

== History ==
Fenshui Township was created in 1958 after the Fenshui County was downgraded.

== Geography ==
The township has an area of 133.1 km^{2}. 65.6% of the soil is red, and 18.5% is paddy. The township is close to the Fenshui River.

== Economy ==
Since 1999, Tonglu County built several farmlands in the region. The so-called Central China Double and Single Rice-Cropping Region plants mostly rice, but also wheat, vegetables and mullberry. The farmers also deal with silkworm, tea and livestock. in 1994, the majority of the township worked as farmers.

The township is also known for their manufacturing sites, specially pens. In 1974, the Hangzhou Ballpoint Pen Factory initiated the production of bamboo ballpoint pens. Eventually, the township specialized in pen production. In 2015, the sector was benefited with the arrival of e-commerce.

== Population ==
In 1994, the population was of 19,508. According to an analysis conducted in 2007 by the Department of Geographic Information Science of the Nanjing University, the township was overcrowded.
