= Fenshui County =

Former county of China

Fenshui County (分水) was a county from northwestern Zhejiang Province.

== History ==
In 1265, during the Song dynasty, Yanzhou (兗州) Province was upgraded to Jiande Fu, overseeing six counties, including Fenshui.

In 1958, the Fenshui County was downgraded as Fenshui Township, Tonglu.
