= ZTO Express =

Chinese Logistics Company

ZTO Express (Cayman) Inc.
- Native name: 中通快递 (开曼) 有限公司
- Type: Public
- Traded as: NYSE: ZTO (ADR); SEHK: 2057
- Industry: Logistics
- Founded: May 2002; 24 years ago
- Founder: Lai Meisong
- Headquarters: Shanghai, China
- Key people: Lai Meisong (Chairman & CEO)
- Revenue: ▲CN¥38.42 billion (2023)
- Net income: ▲CN¥8.76 billion (2023)
- Total assets: ▲CN¥88.47 billion (2023)
- Total equity: ▲CN¥60.28 billion (2023)
- Number of employees: 23,554 (2023)
- Website: zto.com

ZTO Express (ZTO; Chinese: 中通快递; pinyin: Zhōngtōng Kuàidì) is a Chinese logistics company based in headquartered in Shanghai. It is one of the largest couriers services in China. It is dual listed on the New York Stock Exchange (NYSE) and as well as the Hong Kong Stock Exchange (SEHK).

== Background ==
ZTO was founded in 2002 by Lai Meisong, a native of Tonglu County which produced the founders of several Chinese Logistics companies including STO Express, Yunda Express and YTO Express. Lai had previously dropped out of high school to work at STO Express where he became a veteran in the logistics industry.

In October 2016, ZTO held its initial public offering (IPO) and became a publicly listed company on the NYSE. This was different from its domestic peers from Tonglu where they chose to do a backdoor listing in China instead. It was speculated that an IPO would allow new shareholders to cash out more easily and for Lai to retain control of the company while siphoning some of his fortune into a developed market. The IPO was the largest in 2016 raising US$1.4 billion. ZTO was said to have benefitted from the "Alibaba effect" due to the latter's success. ZTO had partnered with Alibaba and 70% of its business came from it.

Despite the success of the IPO, since the start of trading ZTO shares declined. By July 2017, the share price was 20% under its IPO price. Birmingham Retirement and Relief System sued ZTO as well as its underwriters, Goldman Sachs and Morgan Stanley. The lawsuit claimed they inflated profit margins in the offering documents to exceed industry peers and lure investors. On 17 July 2019, the court ruled in favour of ZTO by dismissing the case. It ruled the investors did not sufficiently allege ZTO misled them.

In May 2018, Alibaba and Cainiao bought 10% of ZTO for US$1.38 billion in an effort to expand their logistics network. ZTO share prices surged 14% as a result.

In September 2020, ZTO held a secondary listing on the SEHK raising US$1.27 billion.

In May 2021, ZTO came under fire after one of its business outlets in Chengdu was found to have transported puppies and kittens as part of the controversial pet blind box sales on e-commerce sites. ZTO apologized for collecting live animals from e-retailers for shipment, which it said breached rules. In response it shut down the outlet in question.

In August 2022, ZTO raised US$870 million through a convertible bond offering. It came less than a day after ZTO said in a SEHK announcement that it had no intention to carry out fundraising after a proposed transaction was flagged in its unaudited first-half results filed to the U.S. regulators.

In December 2022, ZTO application to convert its Hong Kong listing from "secondary" to "primary" was approved and would be effective from 1 May 2023 onwards.

In March 2026, ZTO Express entered into a strategic partnership with Hungary Airlines to significantly expand air freight capacities between China and Hungary. Within the framework of this cooperation, an Airbus A330 freighter was put into service, which arrived at its Budapest hub on 24 April 2026.
