= Tonglu County =

Tonglu 桐庐县 Tunglu
- County
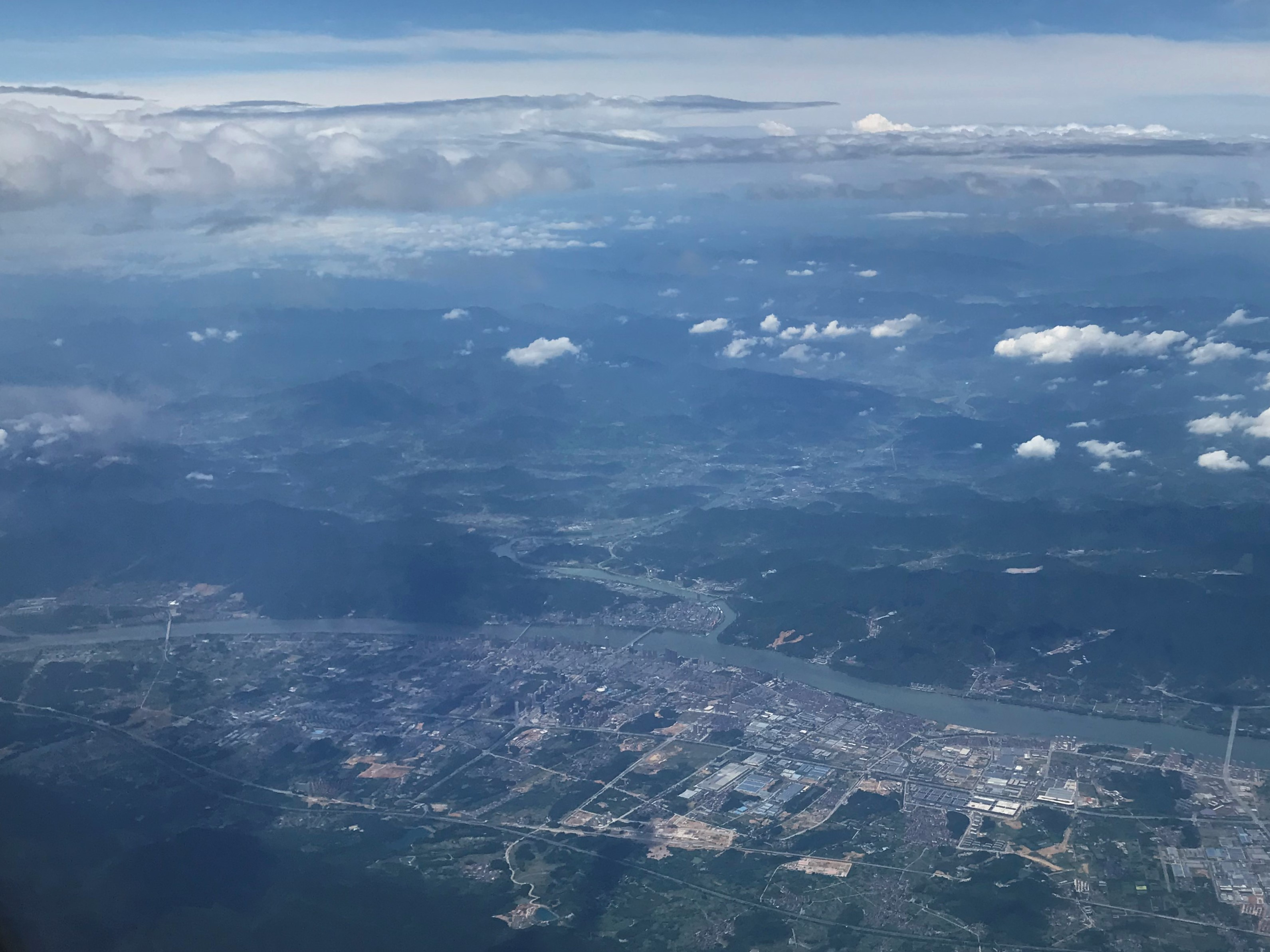
- Aerial view of Tonglu County

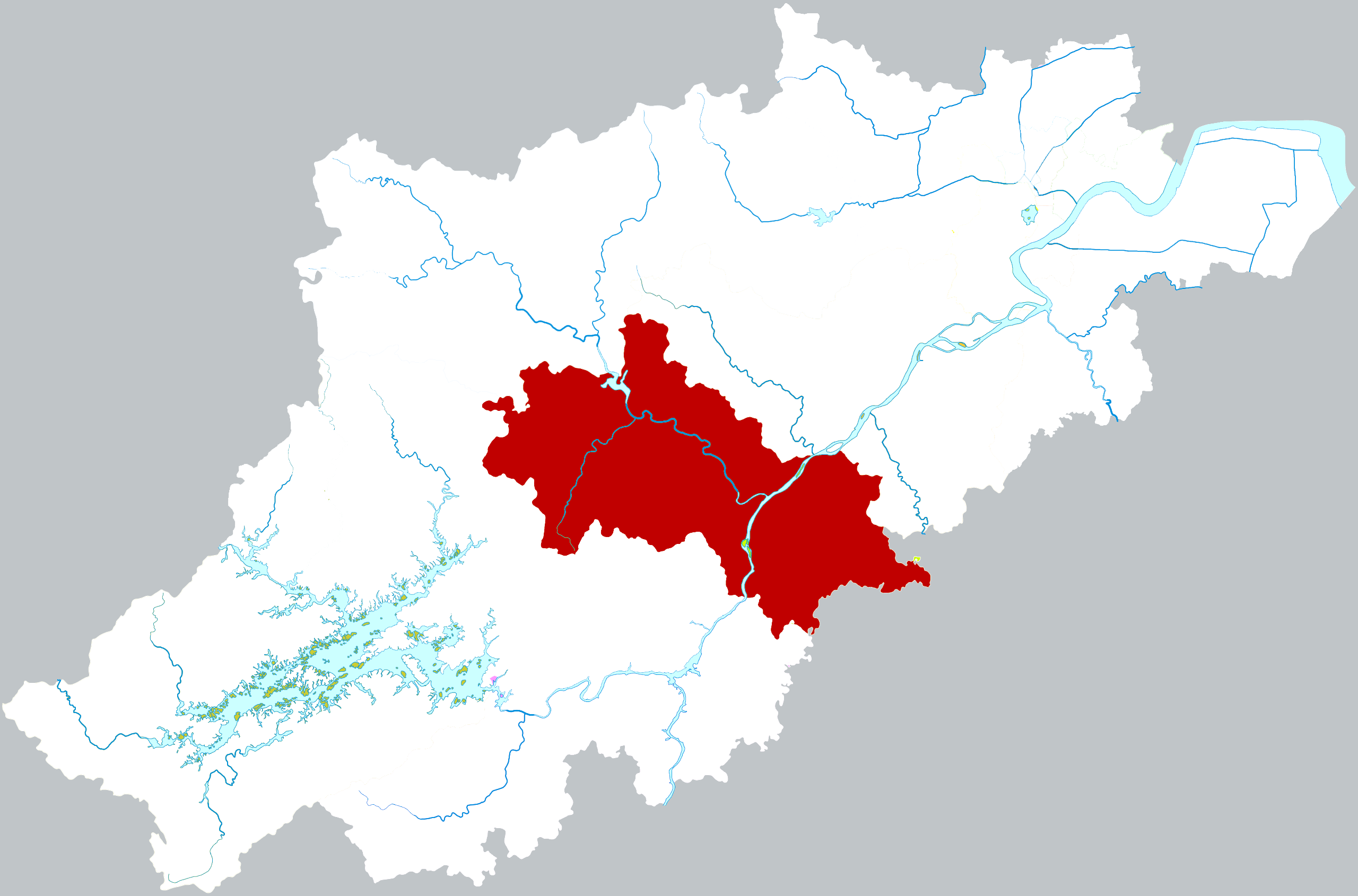
- Location of Tonglu County within Hangzhou

- Location of the seat in Zhejiang
- Coordinates: 29°48′N 119°50′E
- Country: People's Republic of China
- Province: Zhejiang
- Sub-provincial city: Hangzhou

Area
  - Total: 1,852 km^{2} (715 sq mi)

Population
  - Total: 400,000
  - Density: 220/km^{2} (560/sq mi)
- Time zone: UTC+8 (China Standard)
- Postal code: 311500
- Area code: 0571
- Website: www.tonglu.gov.cn

Tonglu County (simplified Chinese: 桐庐县; traditional Chinese: 桐廬縣; pinyin: Tónglú Xiàn) is a county of Zhejiang Province, East China, under the administration of the prefecture-level city of Hangzhou, the capital of the province.

The subdivisions of Tonglu County include a She ethnic township.

The Tonglu County has an area of 1844 km^{2}, with 30 townships and 7 market towns. The economy is mostly agrarian. In 1994, 86,6% of households worked in the so called Central China Double and Single Rice-Cropping Region. In 1993, the total production from the county was of 952 million yuan, of which 814 million yuan came from industry and 138 million yuan from agriculture.

The county is famous for the home of founders of four separate express delivery and logistics companies, known as Kuaidi in Chinese, including 申通快递 (STO Express), 韵达 (Yunda), 圆通速递 (YTO Express) and 中通快递 (ZTO Express). They are called China's Kuaidi Tonglu Gang (桐庐帮).

== Administrative divisions ==
Subdistricts:

- Tongjun Subdistrict (桐君街道), Jiuxian Subdistrict (旧县街道)

Towns:

- Fuchunjiang (富春江镇), Hengcun (横村镇), Fenshui (分水镇), Fengchuan (凤川镇), Baijiang (百江镇), Yaolin (瑶琳镇), Jiangnan (江南镇)

Townships:

- Zhongshan Township (钟山乡), Xinhe Township (新合乡), Hecun Township (合村乡), Eshan She Ethnic Township (莪山畲族乡), Fenshui Township

== Climate ==
Climate data for Tonglu, elevation 46 m (151 ft), (1991–2020 normals, extremes 1981–2010)
Month	Jan	Feb	Mar	Apr	May	Jun	Jul	Aug	Sep	Oct	Nov	Dec	Year
Record high °C (°F)	23.8 (74.8)	27.8 (82.0)	34.0 (93.2)	35.0 (95.0)	37.1 (98.8)	38.6 (101.5)	41.6 (106.9)	42.4 (108.3)	40.2 (104.4)	35.0 (95.0)	30.6 (87.1)	24.1 (75.4)	42.4 (108.3)
Mean daily maximum °C (°F)	9.2 (48.6)	11.9 (53.4)	16.5 (61.7)	22.7 (72.9)	27.4 (81.3)	29.6 (85.3)	34.4 (93.9)	33.7 (92.7)	28.9 (84.0)	23.8 (74.8)	18.0 (64.4)	11.7 (53.1)	22.3 (72.2)
Daily mean °C (°F)	4.9 (40.8)	7.0 (44.6)	11.2 (52.2)	17.0 (62.6)	21.9 (71.4)	25.0 (77.0)	29.1 (84.4)	28.4 (83.1)	24.1 (75.4)	18.6 (65.5)	12.7 (54.9)	6.8 (44.2)	17.2 (63.0)
Mean daily minimum °C (°F)	1.8 (35.2)	3.6 (38.5)	7.3 (45.1)	12.6 (54.7)	17.6 (63.7)	21.6 (70.9)	25.1 (77.2)	24.7 (76.5)	20.6 (69.1)	14.9 (58.8)	9.2 (48.6)	3.4 (38.1)	13.5 (56.4)
Record low °C (°F)	−7.0 (19.4)	−6.2 (20.8)	−3.9 (25.0)	1.0 (33.8)	8.7 (47.7)	12.4 (54.3)	18.4 (65.1)	18.3 (64.9)	10.2 (50.4)	3.1 (37.6)	−2.4 (27.7)	−9.5 (14.9)	−9.5 (14.9)
Average precipitation mm (inches)	94.2 (3.71)	98.0 (3.86)	148.7 (5.85)	149.7 (5.89)	157.2 (6.19)	295.9 (11.65)	155.0 (6.10)	161.9 (6.37)	111.7 (4.40)	69.5 (2.74)	80.1 (3.15)	66.8 (2.63)	1,588.7 (62.54)
Average precipitation days (≥ 0.1 mm)	13.3	12.7	15.9	15.1	14.8	15.9	12.0	13.9	11.5	8.8	10.9	10.4	155.2
Average snowy days	4.2	2.7	0.8	0	0	0	0	0	0	0	0.1	1.8	9.6
Average relative humidity (%)	78	77	75	74	74	80	74	76	79	77	79	77	77
Mean monthly sunshine hours	89.7	92.2	113.6	133.0	150.0	120.2	209.1	191.3	142.1	140.6	111.7	109.4	1,602.9
Percentage possible sunshine	28	29	30	34	36	29	49	47	39	40	35	35	36
Source: China Meteorological Administration

== Transportation ==
The county is served by Tonglu railway station.
