= Dodo, Prince Yu =

Qing dynasty prince and general (1614–1649)

Dodo
- Prince Yu of the First Rank
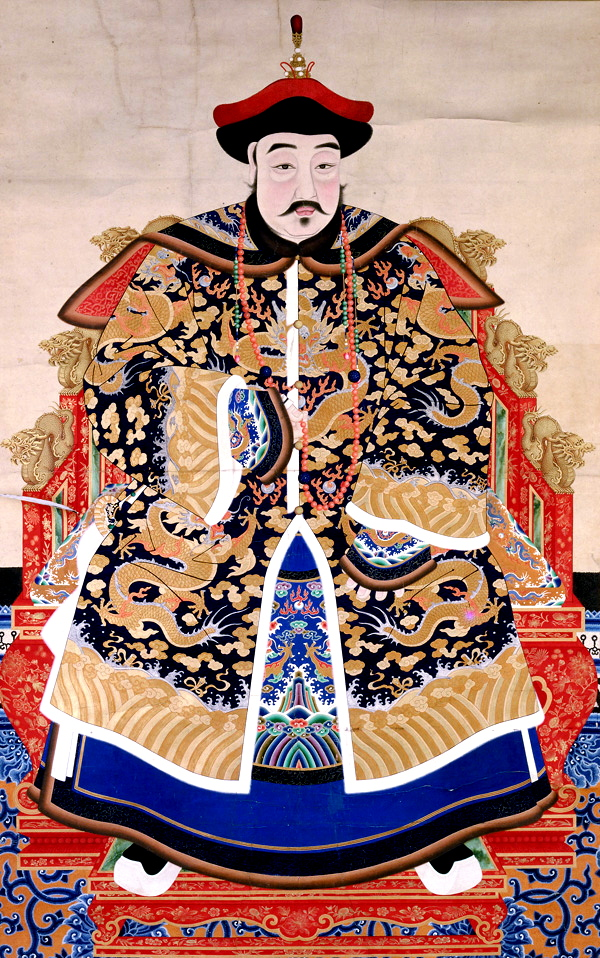
- Portrait of Dodo from the Palace Museum Archives

Prince Yu of the First Rank
- Reign: 1636–1649
- Predecessor: None
- Successor: Doni (as Prince Xin)
- Born: 2 April 1614
- Died: 29 April 1649 (aged 35); Beijing, Qing dynasty, China
- Consorts: Lady Borjigit Borjigit Dazhe (m. 1633) Lady Nara
- Issue: Zhulan; Duoni, Prince Yuxuanhe of the First Rank; Bakedu; Cani; Duo'erbo, Prince Rui of the First Rank; Zhakedu; Dongge, Prince Xin of the Second Rank; Fiyanggū; Princess of the Third Rank; Princess of the Fourth Rank
Names
- Dodo
Posthumous name
- Prince Yutong of the First Rank (和碩豫通親王)
- House: Aisin Gioro
- Father: Nurhaci
- Mother: Empress Xiaoliewu

Dodo
- Traditional Chinese: 多鐸
- Simplified Chinese: 多铎
Transcriptions
Standard Mandarin
- Hanyu Pinyin: Duōduó
Yue: Cantonese
- Yale Romanization: dō dohk
- Jyutping: do1 dok6

Dodo (Manchu: ᡩᠣᡩᠣ; 2 April 1614 – 29 April 1649), formally known as Prince Yu, was a Manchu prince and military general of the early Qing dynasty.

== Family background ==
Dodo was born in the Manchu Aisin Gioro clan as the 15th son of Nurhaci, the founder of the Later Jin dynasty. His mother was Nurhaci's primary spouse Lady Abahai, who also bore Dodo's full brothers Ajige and Dorgon.

== Career ==
=== Hong Taiji's reign ===
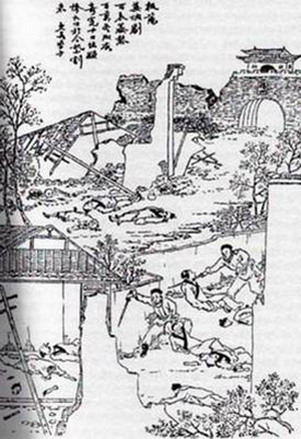
A late-Qing woodblock print representing the Yangzhou massacre of May 1645. Dodo ordered this massacre to scare other southern Chinese cities into submission. By the late nineteenth century the massacre was used by anti-Qing revolutionaries to arouse anti-Manchu sentiment among the ethnic Chinese population.

In 1620, Dodo was conferred the title of an ejen. He became a beile at the age of 13 and was put in charge of the Plain White Banner, and started administrating affairs in the Ministry of Rites and Ministry of War. In 1628, Dodo followed Hong Taiji on the conquest of Chahar, Mongolia, and was granted the title of eerkechuhuer (額爾克楚虎爾) for his achievements. The following year, he followed Hong Taiji again on the conquest of the Ming dynasty, crossing the Great Wall and closing in on the Ming capital Beijing.

In 1631, Dodo was involved in besieging the Ming army at Dalinghe. He lost his footing and fell from his horse during a battle and almost died at Jinzhou. The following year he participated in a campaign against Ligdan Khan of Chahar. In 1635 he was appointed commander-in-chief for the first time at the Battle of Dalinghe.

In 1636, Dodo was promoted to qinwang under the title "Prince Yu of the First Rank". He followed Hong Taiji on the campaign against the Joseon dynasty of Korea and defeated the enemy at Mount Nanhan. Two years later, he was demoted two grades to beile for bringing prostitutes with him in his army. In 1641, Dodo participated in the Battle of Songjin and led the Qing army in besieging Jinzhou in the first part of the battle. He led an ambush to wipe out the remnants of the enemy at Mount Song in the final battle and joined Hooge's forces in besieging Mount Song and captured the Ming general Hong Chengchou. He was promoted one grade to junwang for his achievement.

=== Shunzhi Emperor's reign ===
In 1644, Dodo entered Ming territory after the Ming general Wu Sangui opened Shanhai Pass for the Qing armies. They defeated rebel forces under Li Zicheng at Shanhai Pass and occupied the Ming capital Beijing, after which Dodo was reinstated as a qinwang and appointed "Great General Who Pacifies the Nation" (定國大將軍). Together with Kong Youde and Geng Zhongming, Dodo led an army of 200,000, comprising both Manchu and Han Chinese soldiers, to attack the remnants of Li Zicheng's rebel army, defeating and driving the enemy from Henan to Shaanxi.

In the first month of 1645, Dodo conquered Tong Pass and Xi'an, and in the second month he attacked the Southern Ming dynasty (remnants of the fallen Ming dynasty). In the fourth month, Dodo captured the city of Yangzhou and executed its defending official Shi Kefa, after which he ordered the Yangzhou massacre. By the following month, Dodo's army had crossed the Yangtze River and occupied the Southern Ming capital Nanjing and captured the Southern Ming ruler, the Hongguang Emperor. In the sixth month, Dodo conquered Zhejiang and returned to Beijing, after which he received the title "Prince Deyu of the First Rank" (和碩德豫親王).

Dodo berated and attacked the Southern Ming Hongguang Emperor (Prince of Fu, Zhu Yousong) over his battle strategy in 1645, telling him that the Southern Ming would have defeated the Qing if only the southern Ming assaulted the Qing military before they forded the Yellow river instead of tarrying. The Prince of Fu could find no words to respond when he tried to defend himself.

In 1646, Dodo was appointed "Great General Who Spreads Might" (揚威大將軍) and led a punitive expedition against the Sönid chief Tenggis, who had fled from Qing rule to the Khalkha Left Wing. Qing forces defeated Tenggis's followers and Khalkha troops sent by Tüsheet Khan and Setsen Khan, but failed to capture either Tenggis or Setsen Khan. The incident became an early Qing–Khalkha military confrontation and was not finally settled by Dodo's campaign itself. A year later, Dodo was conferred the title "Uncle Who Assists in Governance and Prince Deyu of the First Rank" (輔政叔和碩德豫親王).

== Death ==
Dodo died of smallpox in 1649 at the age of 36. Dodo was said to have a very close relationship with his brother Dorgon. Dorgon was attacking Jiang Xiang (姜瓖) in Shanxi when he heard that Dodo was severely ill, so he immediately turned and rushed back to Beijing, but when he arrived at Juyong Pass, he received news that Dodo had died. Dorgon was so grieved that he changed into plain robes and cried as he raced back to Beijing.

== Posthumous demotion and restoration ==
In 1652, the Shunzhi Emperor posthumously demoted Dodo to the status of a junwang for his affiliation with Dorgon, whom the emperor perceived to have had the intention of usurping the throne. In 1671, during the reign of the Kangxi Emperor, Dodo was granted a posthumous name "Tong" (通), so his title became "Prince Yutong of the Second Rank" (多羅豫通郡王). In the first lunar month of 1778, the Qianlong Emperor posthumously restored Dodo to the status of a qinwang and created a place for Dodo in the Qing ancestral temple. Seven months later, a shrine was built for Dodo in the Mukden Palace.

== Family ==
=== Primary Consort ===
- First primary consort, of the Khorchin Borjigit clan (嫡福晉 博爾濟吉特氏)
  - First daughter
    - Married Zhemen (輒門) of the Barin in January/February 1645
  - Princess of the Third Rank (郡主; 1634–1649), third daughter
    - Married Haoshan (豪善) in 1646
- Second primary consort, of the Khorchin Borjigit clan (繼福晉 博爾濟吉特氏), personal name Dazhe (達哲)
  - Duoni, Prince Yuxuanhe of the First Rank (豫宣和親王 多尼; 15 November 1636 – 2 February 1661), second son
  - Duo'erbo, Prince Rui of the First Rank (睿親王 多爾博; 19 February 1643 – 7 February 1673), fifth son
- Third primary consort, of the Nara clan (嫡福晉 那拉氏)

=== Secondary Consort ===
- Secondary consort, of the Tunggiya clan (側福晉 佟佳氏)
  - Cani, Duke Kexi of the Second Rank (輔國恪僖公 察尼; 17 April 1641 – 15 October 1688), fourth son
  - Dongge, Prince Xin of the Second Rank (信郡王 董額; 9 February 1647 – 3 August 1706), seventh son
  - Princess of the Fourth Rank (縣主), eighth daughter
    - Married Eqi'er (鄂齊爾) of the Khorchin Borjigit clan in 1663

=== Concubine ===
- Mistress, of the Nara clan (那拉氏)
  - Zhulan (珠蘭; 1 December 1635 – 13 April 1665), first son
- Mistress, of the Gūwalgiya clan (瓜爾佳氏)
  - Bakedu (巴克度; 3 June 1640 – 14 April 1668), third son
- Mistress, of the Gūwalgiya clan (瓜爾佳氏)
  - Zhakedu (扎克度; 24 May 1644 – 21 February 1689), sixth son
- Mistress, of the Tunggiya clan (佟佳氏)
  - Fiyanggū, Duke of the Second Rank (輔國公 費揚古; 20 March 1649 – 9 September 1723), eighth son
- Unknown
  - A daughter who married Shi Huashan (石華善; d. 1695)

== Ancestry ==
Giocangga (1526–1583)
Taksi (1543–1583)
Empress Yi
Nurhaci (1559–1626)
Agu
Empress Xuan (d. 1569)
Dodo (1614–1649)
Bugan
Mantai (d. 1596)
Empress Xiaoliewu (1590–1626)

== See also ==
- Prince Yu (豫)
- Royal and noble ranks of the Qing dynasty
- Ranks of imperial consorts in China#Qing
