= Lady Abahai =

Wife of Nurhaci (1590–1626)

Abahai
- Empress of the Qing dynasty (posthumously)
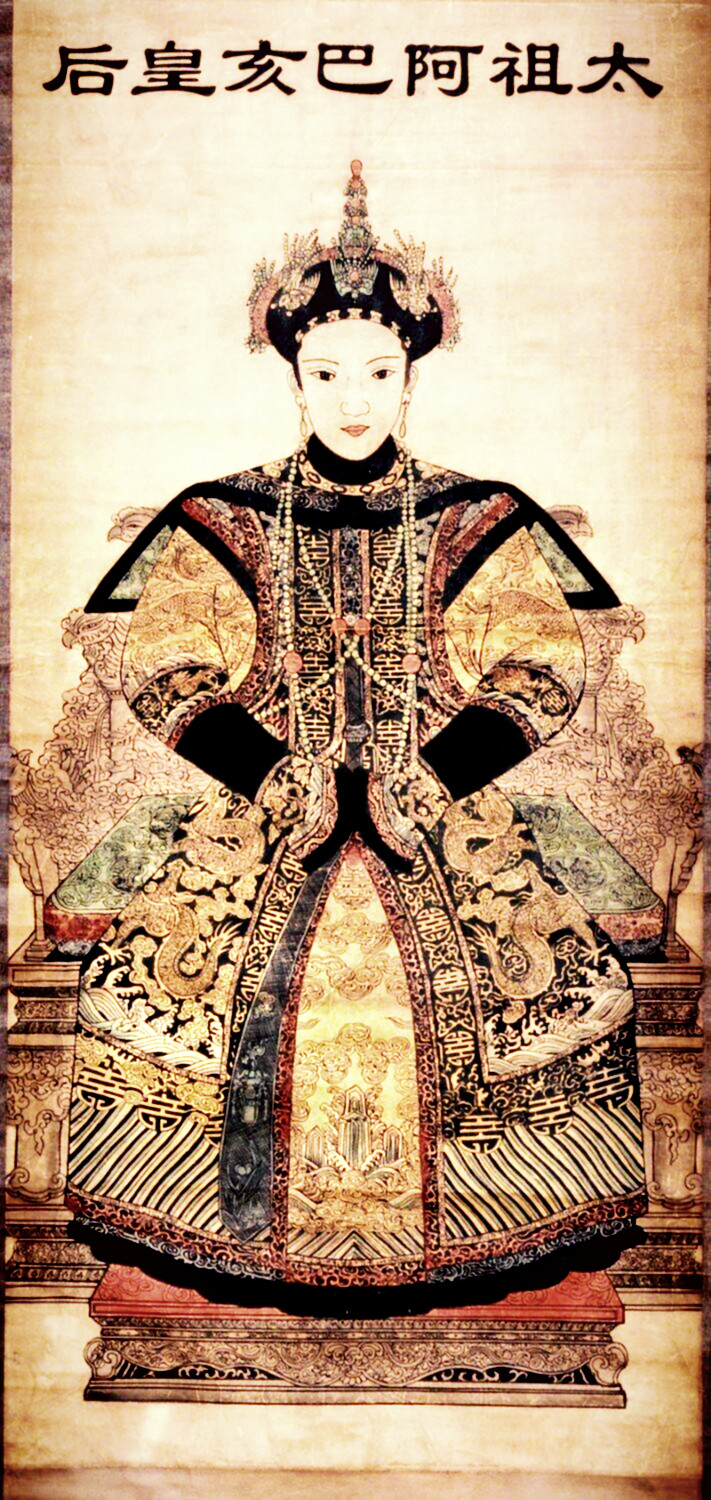
- Portrait of Empress Xiaoliewu in court dress, by anonymous painter
- Born: 1590; Ula City, Manchuria (in present-day Jilin City)
- Died: 1 October 1626 (aged 35–36); Mukden Palace (in present-day Shenyang)
- Burial: Fu Mausoleum
- Spouse: Nurhaci (m. 1601; died 1626)
- Issue Detail: Ajige, Prince Ying of the First Rank; Dorgon, Prince Ruizhong of the First Rank; Dodo, Prince Yutong of the First Rank
Posthumous name
- Empress Xiaolie Gongmin Xianzhe Renhe Zantian Lisheng Wu (孝烈恭敏獻哲仁和贊天儷聖武皇后) (1650–1653)
- House: Ula-Nara (by birth); Aisin-Gioro (by marriage)
- Father: Mantai

Empress Xiaoliewu (1590 – 1 October 1626), of the Ula-Nara clan, personal name Abahai, was a wife of Nurhaci.

Abahai was erroneously identified with Hong Taiji, Nurhaci's eighth son and successor, in earlier sources.

== Life ==
=== Family background ===
- Father: Mantai (滿泰; d. 1596); held the title of beile (貝勒)
  - Grandfather: Bugan (布幹); held the title of beile (貝勒)
  - Uncle: Bujantai (1575–1618); held the title of beile (貝勒)

=== Wanli era ===
In November or December 1601, during the Wanli era, Abahai married Nurhaci, becoming one of his many wives. At an unspecified time following Monggo Jerjer's death in 1603, she was elevated to great consort. She gave birth on 28 August 1605 to Nurhaci's 12th son, Ajige, on 17 November 1612 to his 14th son, Dorgon, and on 2 April 1614 to his 15th son, Dodo.

In early 1620, Abahai was regularly spotted visiting the chambers of Daišan, Nurhaci's eldest son. She also prepared dishes for him. A lady-in-waiting reported those incidents to Nurhaci, who was outraged. However, wanting to protect the family's reputation, Nurhaci berated Abahai for another matter, that of stealing gold and jewels. She was banished following this event.

=== Tianqi era ===
Soon after Abahai's banishment, Nurhaci started to miss her. By 1622, he was considering bringing her back. Around late 1622 to early 1623, Abahai returned and her status was restored.

=== Tiancong era ===
When Nurhaci died on 30 September 1626, Abahai was forced to commit suicide by her stepson, Hong Taiji. According to legend, she was forced to accept being buried alive beside Nurhaci to prove her love for him. Other sources claim that she was strangled by Hong Taiji's servants as she stood as a threat to his ascension. Either way, Abahai committed suicide on 1 October 1626, the day after Nurhaci's death, on the order of Hong Taiji. She was 36 years old.

=== Shunzhi era ===
During the early reign of the Shunzhi Emperor, while Dorgon served as regent for the underage emperor, Abahai was posthumously honored as "Empress Xiaoliewu", but the title was revoked in 1653.

== Titles ==
- During the reign of the Wanli Emperor (r. 1572–1620):
  - Lady Ula-Nara (烏拉那拉氏)
  - Consort (福晉; from November/December 1601) (Note: The Jurchens had multiple wives with very little distinction between them, all being addressed by this general term. This was also the case for Nurhaci's wives. It was in later compilations of documents that the women were attributed new titles to differentiate them.)
  - Great Consort (大福晉; from unknown date)
- During the reign of the Shunzhi Emperor (r. 1643–1661):
  - Empress Xiaoliewu (孝烈武皇后; from 1650 to 1653)

== Issue ==
- Ajige (阿濟格), Prince Ying of the First Rank (英親王; 28 August 1605 – 28 November 1651), Nurhaci's 12th son
- Dorgon (多爾袞), Prince Ruizhong of the First Rank (睿忠親王; 17 November 1612 – 31 December 1650), Nurhaci's 14th son
- Dodo (多鐸), Prince Yutong of the First Rank (豫通親王; 2 April 1614 – 29 April 1649), Nurhaci's 15th son

== In popular culture ==
- Portrayed by Eva Lai in The Rise and Fall of Qing Dynasty (1987)
- Portrayed by Siqin Gaowa in Xiaozhuang Mishi (2003)
- Portrayed by Cheng Lisha in Taizu Mishi (2005)
- Portrayed by Tao Huimin in Da Qing Fengyun (2006)
- Portrayed by Kara Wai in The Legend of Xiaozhuang (2015)
- Portrayed by Chen Xinyu in Rule the World (2017)

== See also ==
- Imperial Chinese harem system § Qing
- Imperial and noble ranks of the Qing dynasty
