= Xiaodongying Mosque =

Mosque in Guangzhou, Guangdong, China

- 小东营清真寺
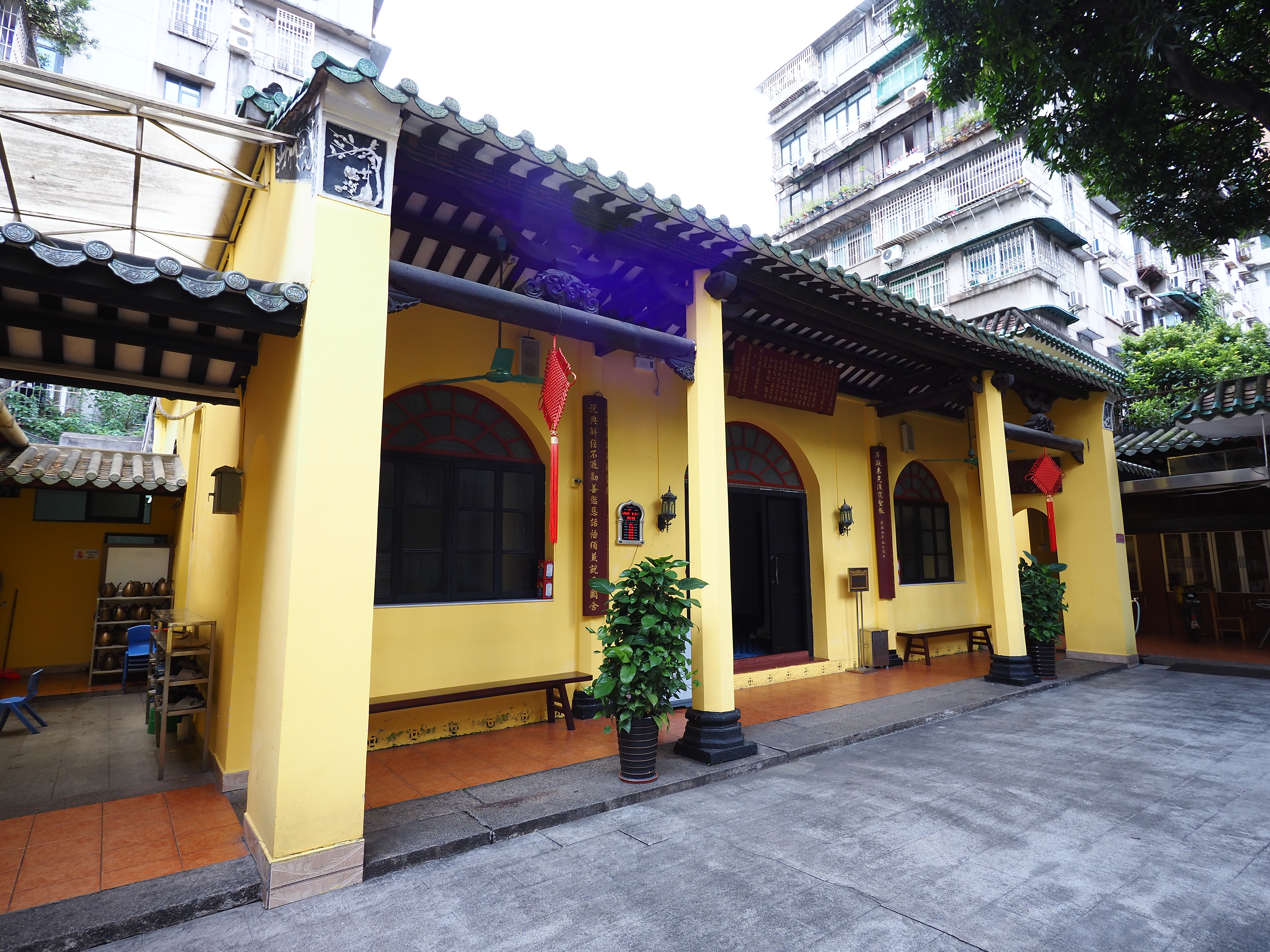

- Location of the mosque in Guangdong

Religion
- Affiliation: Sunni Islam
- Ecclesiastical or organizational status: Mosque
- Status: Active

Location
- Location: 1 Yuehua Road, Yuexiu, Guangzhou, Guangdong
- Country: China
- Interactive map of Xiaodongying Mosque
- Coordinates: 23°07′46″N 113°16′11″E

Architecture
- Type: Mosque
- Style: Chinese palace
- Completed: 1468 CE

Specifications
- Capacity: 300 worshipers
- Interior area: 153 square metres (1,650 sq ft)

The Xiaodongying Mosque (simplified Chinese: 小东营清真寺; traditional Chinese: 小東營清真寺; pinyin: Xiǎodōngyíng Qīngzhēnsì) is a mosque in Yuexiu District, Guangzhou City, in the Guangdong Province of China.

== History ==
The mosque was constructed in 1468 CE, during the Chenghua Emperor (r. 1464–1487) reign of the Ming Dynasty. It was renovated twice during Qing Dynasty.

== Architecture ==
The mosque was constructed in the Chinese palace architectural style, and covers an area of 600 square metres (6,500 sq ft) with a 153-square-metre (1,650 sq ft) main prayer hall, with capacity for approximately 300 worshipers.

== Transportation ==
The mosque is accessible within walking distance northeast of Gongyuanqian Station of Guangzhou Metro.

== See also ==
Xiaodongying Mosque
- Simplified Chinese: 小东营清真寺
- Traditional Chinese: 小東營清真寺
Transcriptions
Standard Mandarin
- Hanyu Pinyin: Xiǎodōngyíng Qīngzhēnsì

- Islam in China
- List of mosques in China
