= Prince Rui =

Prince Rui may refer to any of the following princely peerages of the Qing dynasty in China:

- Prince Rui (睿), created in 1636
- Prince Rui (瑞), created in 1819
