= Abahai =

Abahai may refer to:

- Lady Abahai (1590–1626), consort of Nurhaci
- Hong Taiji (1592–1643), Qing Emperor 1626–1636, sometimes referred to as Abahai in Western literature
