= Prince Rui (created 1636) =

Title of princely peerage in Qing China (1644–1912)

Prince Rui of the First Rank

Chinese name
- Traditional Chinese: 和碩睿親王
- Simplified Chinese: 和硕睿亲王
Transcriptions
Standard Mandarin
- Hanyu Pinyin: héshuò ruì qīnwáng
- Wade–Giles: ho-shuo jui ch'in-wang

Manchu name
- Manchu script: ᡥᠣᡧᠣ ᡳ ᠮᡝᡵᡤᡝᠨ ᠴᡳᠨ ᠸᠠᠩ
- Romanization: hošoi mergen cin wang

Prince Rui of the First Rank, or simply Prince Rui, was the title of a princely peerage used in China during the Manchu-led Qing dynasty (1644–1912). It was also one of the 12 "iron-cap" princely peerages in the Qing dynasty, which meant that the title could be passed down without being downgraded.

The first bearer of the title was Dorgon (1612–1650), the 14th son of Nurhaci, the founder of the Later Jin dynasty. He was awarded the title in 1636 by his half-brother, Hong Taiji, who succeeded their father to the Later Jin throne and who later established the Qing dynasty. After Dorgon's death, the Shunzhi Emperor abolished the Prince Rui peerage. In 1778, the Qianlong Emperor not only restored the Prince Rui peerage, but also granted it "iron-cap" status. Chunying (died 1800), a sixth-generation descendant of Dorgon's younger brother, Dodo, was selected to inherit the Prince Rui title. The title was passed down over 12 generations and held by eight persons.

== Members of the Prince Rui peerage ==
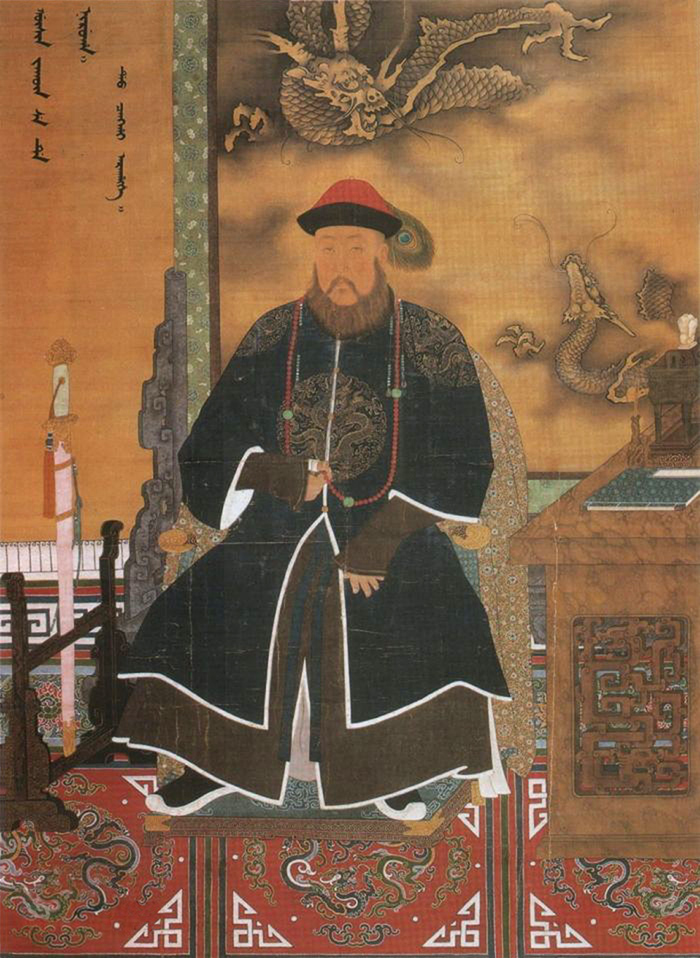
Dorgon (1612–1650), the first Prince Rui

Demonstration tree
- Dorgon (1st), Nurhaci's 14th son, held the title Prince Rui of the First Rank from 1636 to 1650, posthumously honoured as Prince Rui Zhong of the First Rank (睿忠親王)
  - Duo'erbo (多爾博; 1643 – 1673) (2nd), Dodo's fifth son, adopted as Dorgon's son, held the title of a beile from 1657 to 1673, posthumously honoured as Prince Rui of the First Rank in 1778
    - Su'erfa (蘇爾發; d. 1708), Duo'erbo's second son, held the title of a beizi from 1673 to 1700, demoted to zhenguo gong in 1700, posthumously honoured as Prince Rui of the First Rank in 1778
      - Saile (塞勒; d. 1729), Su'erfa's eldest son, held the title of a third class defender general from 1699 to 1708, promoted to bulwark duke in 1708, posthumously honoured as Prince Rui of the First Rank in 1778
        - Gongyibu (功宜布; d. 1746), Saile's fifth son, held the title of a bulwark duke from 1744 to 1746, posthumously honoured as Fuguo Keqin Gong in 1746 and then as Prince Rui Keqin of the First Rank (睿恪勤親王) in 1778
          - Rusong (如松; d. 1770), Gongyibu's son, held the title Prince Xin of the Second Rank from 1762 to 1770, posthumously honoured as Prince Xin Ke of the Second Rank in 1770 and then as Prince Rui Ke of the First Rank (睿恪親王) in 1778
            - Chunying (淳穎; d. 1800) (3rd), Rusong's son, held the title of a bulwark duke from 1771 to 1778, promoted to Prince Rui of the First Rank in 1778, posthumously honoured as Prince Rui Gong of the First Rank (睿恭親王)
              - Bao'en (寶恩; 1777 – 1802) (4th), Chunying's eldest son, held the title Prince Rui of the First Rank from 1801 to 1802, posthumously honoured as Prince Rui Shen of the First Rank (睿慎親王)
              - Duan'en (端恩; 1788 – 1826) (5th), Chunying's second son, held the title Prince Rui of the First Rank from 1802 to 1826, posthumously honoured as Prince Rui Qin of the First Rank (睿勤親王)
                - Renshou (仁壽; 1810 – 1864) (6th), Duan'en's son, held the title Prince Rui of the First Rank from 1826 to 1864, posthumously honoured as Prince Rui Xi of the First Rank (睿僖親王)
                  - Dechang (德長; 1838 – 1876) (7th), Renshou's son, held the title Prince Rui of the First Rank from 1865 to 1876, posthumously honoured as Prince Rui Que of the First Rank (睿愨親王)
                    - Kuibin (魁斌; 1864 – 1915) (8th), Dechang's son, held the title Prince Rui of the First Rank from 1876 to 1915, posthumously honoured as Prince Rui Jing of the First Rank (睿敬親王)
                      - Zhongquan (中銓; 1892 – 1939), Kuibin's son, held the title Prince Rui of the First Rank from 1915 to 1939
                      - Zhongming (中銘), Kuibin's son
                        - Yinian (頤年; 1916 - 1987), Zhongquan's nephew, given but abandoned and rejected the title. Extinction of his line.

== Family tree ==
Family tree

adoption
Nurhaci 努爾哈赤 (1559–1626)	Lady Ulanara 烏喇那拉氏 (1590–1626)
Dorgon 多爾袞 (1612–1650); Prince Ruizhong 睿忠親王 (1636–1650)	Dodo 多鐸 (1614–1649); Prince Yutong 豫通親王 (1636–1649)
Duo'erbo 多爾博 (1643–1673); Prince Rui 睿親王 (posthumously awarded)
Su'erfa 蘇爾發 (died 1708); Prince Rui 睿親王 (posthumously awarded)
Saile 塞勒 (died 1729); Prince Rui 睿親王 (posthumously awarded)
Gongyibu 功宜布 (died 1746); Prince Ruikeqin 睿恪勤親王 (posthumously awarded)
Rusong 如松 (died 1770); Prince Ruike 睿恪親王 (posthumously awarded)
Chunying 淳穎 (died 1800); Prince Ruigong 睿恭親王 (1778–1800)
Bao'en 寶恩 (1777–1802); Prince Ruishen 睿慎親王 (1801–1802)	Duan'en 端恩 (1788–1826); Prince Ruiqin 睿勤親王 (1802–1826)
Renshou 仁壽 (1810–1864); Prince Ruixi 睿僖親王 (1826–1864)
Dechang 德長 (1838–1876); Prince Ruique 睿愨親王 (1865–1876)
Kuibin 魁斌 (1864–1915); Prince Ruijing 睿敬親王 (1876–1915)
Zhongquan 中銓 (1892–1939); Prince Rui 睿親王 (1915–1939)

== See also ==
- Royal and noble ranks of the Qing dynasty
