= Yinian =

Aisin-Gioro Yinian (1916–1987), art name Rushiguange (如是觀閣) was a Manchu nobleman, author and the last heir of the Rui peerage before the extinction of his line. He was also known by his Han-Chinese name Jin Jishui (金寄水).

== Life ==
The peerage of Prince Rui was created in 1636 in honor of Dorgon's merits. Although Dorgon had no male heir, his nephew Dorbo was adopted by him and succeeded his title. Yinian was a descendant of Dorbo.

Yinian was born in Beijing. In his early years, he was surrounded by the servants in his family residence and enjoyed a prestigious life. After the death of his uncle Zhongquan in 1939, who had no offspring, Yinian was designated as his uncle's successor.

Puyi, the head of the house of Aisin-Gioro who had abdicated from the throne of China by then, was set up as a puppet by the Japanese Empire in Manchuria during the Second World War. Puyi attempted to contact Yinian and invited him to succeed his uncle's peerage. Yinian was enraged by Puyi's offer since he deeply despised Puyi for the latter's cooperation with the Japanese. As a result, he refused his title and peerage and even compared Puyi with Shi Jingtang, who cooperated with the Khitans. Yinian's living condition had worsened throughout years due to his uncle's squandering of family properties. By the time of his uncle's death, he had to pawn off valuable belongings he possessed. Despite not being able to make a living, he rejected the invitations that offered him a job in the administration system of Japanese occupation.

After the wars, Yinian worked in Beijing Library as a transcriber. He published several novels in the 1940s. In the 1950s, he started a magazine with another Manchu writer Jin Shoushen from Wanyan clan. During the Cultural Revolution, he was able to make through the political turbulence without being harmed, since he was not into politics.

In 1974, he was invited by a government-run publishing house to participate in the revision of the Compendium of Materia Medica. Yinian died in 1987 unmarried and childless.

Yinian's memoir “Life in the Imperial Mansion” was a faithful recall of the aristocratic life of Qing dynasty nobles. His poetry also received a certain degree of recognition among the Chinese literati.
