= Zhongquan =

Manchu nobleman of the Prince Rui peerage

Zhongquan 中銓
- Prince Rui of the First Rank

Prince Rui of the First Rank
- Tenure: 22 May 1915 – 1 November 1939
- Predecessor: Kuibin
- Born: 26 November 1892
- Died: 1 November 1939 (aged 46)
Names
- Zhongquan (中銓)
- House: Aisin-Gioro
- Father: Kuibin

Zhongquan (Chinese: 中銓, 26 November 1892 – 1 November 1939) was a Manchu nobleman of the Prince Rui peerage, which was held from 1915 to 1939. His nephew, Yinian, was given the title of Prince Rui, but abandoned and rejected the title, which marked the extinction of the Prince Rui peerage.

The peerage of Prince Rui was created in 1636 in honor of Dorgon's merits. Although Dorgon had no male heir, his nephew Dorbo was adopted by him and succeeded his title. Zhongquan was a descendant of Dorbo.

In 1915, Zhongquan's father Kuibin died around the age of 50-51. This passed the Prince Rui peerage to Zhongquan, who held this title until his death.
