= Chinese palace =

Imperial complex in China

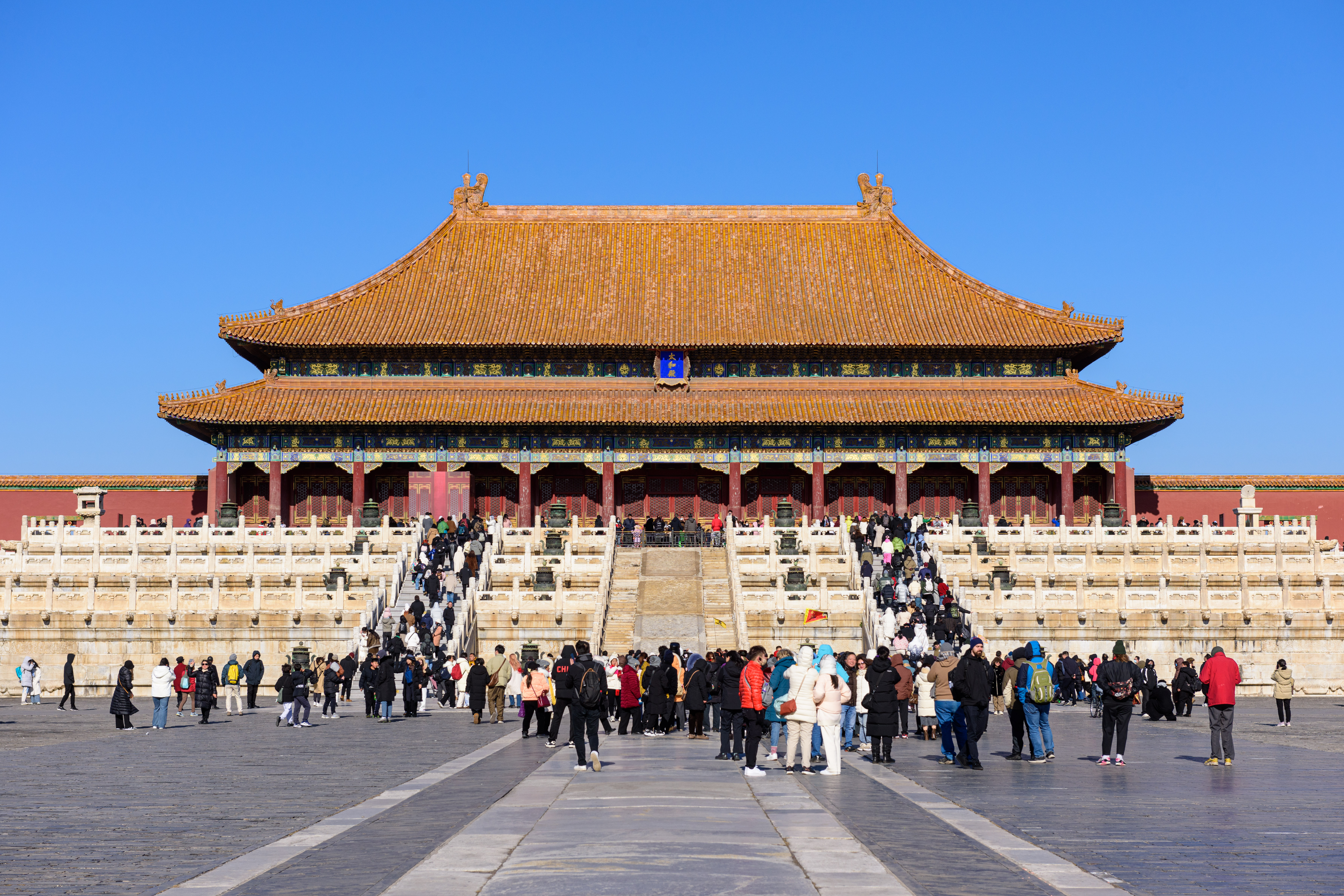
Hall of Supreme Harmony within the Forbidden City of Beijing

A Chinese palace is an imperial complex where the court, civil government, royal garden and defensive fortress resided. Its structures are considerable and elaborate. The Chinese character Gong (宮; meaning "palace") represents two connected rooms (呂) under a roof (宀). Originally the character applied to any residence or mansion, but it was used in reference to solely the imperial residence since the Qin dynasty (3rd century BC).

A traditional Chinese palace comprises multiple buildings arranged within expansive walled and moated compounds. It contains large halls (殿) for ceremonies and official functions, along with smaller structures such as temples, towers, residences, galleries, courtyards, gardens, and auxiliary buildings.

The world's largest palace to have ever existed, the Weiyang Palace, was built by the Western Han dynasty on the order of the Emperor Gaozu. The world's largest palace currently still in existence, the Forbidden City, was constructed by the Ming dynasty during the reign of the Yongle Emperor.

== Main imperial palaces, in chronological order ==
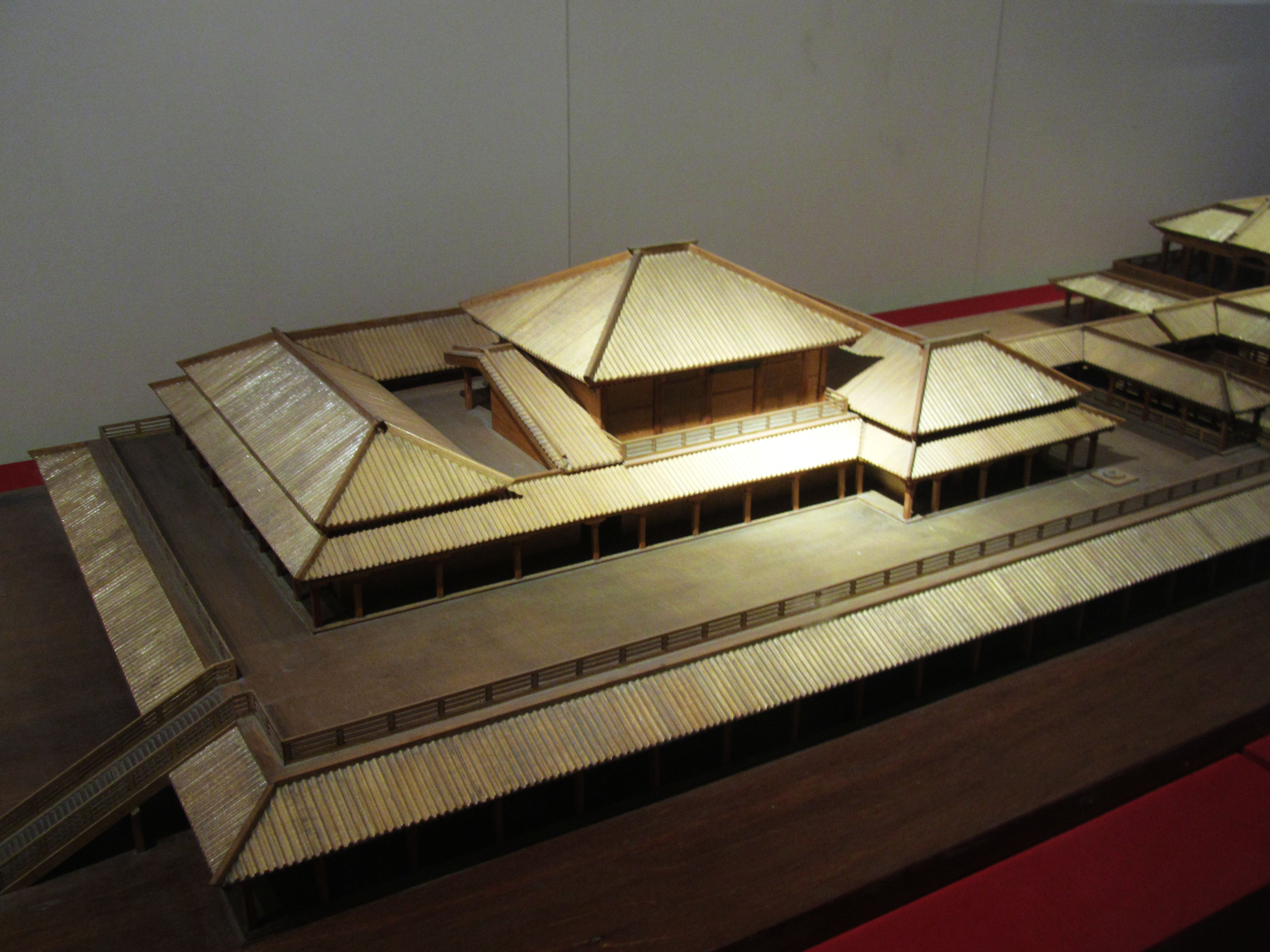
Model of Xianyang Palace (1st millennium BCE); with architectural styles typical of pre-imperial China

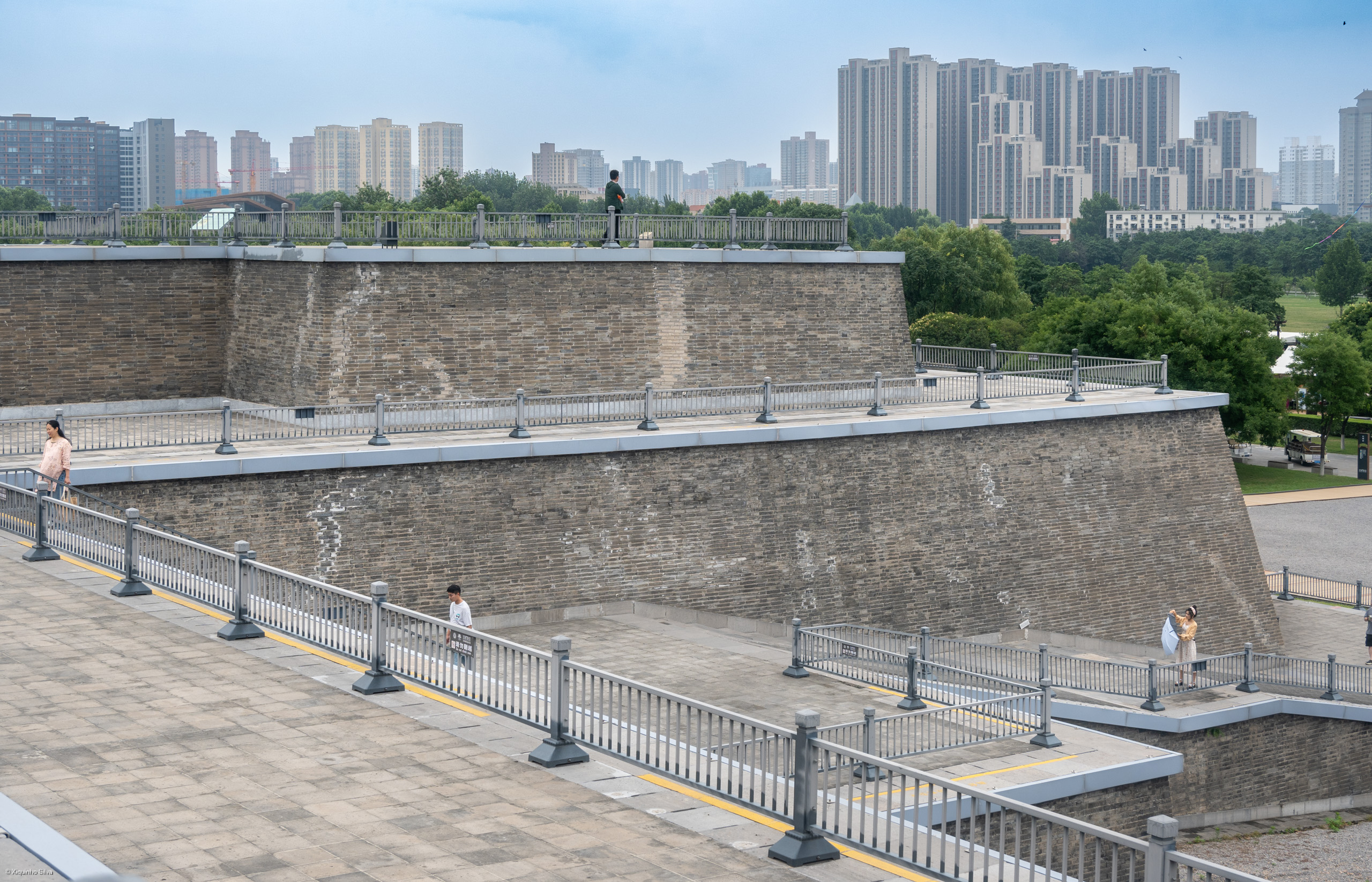
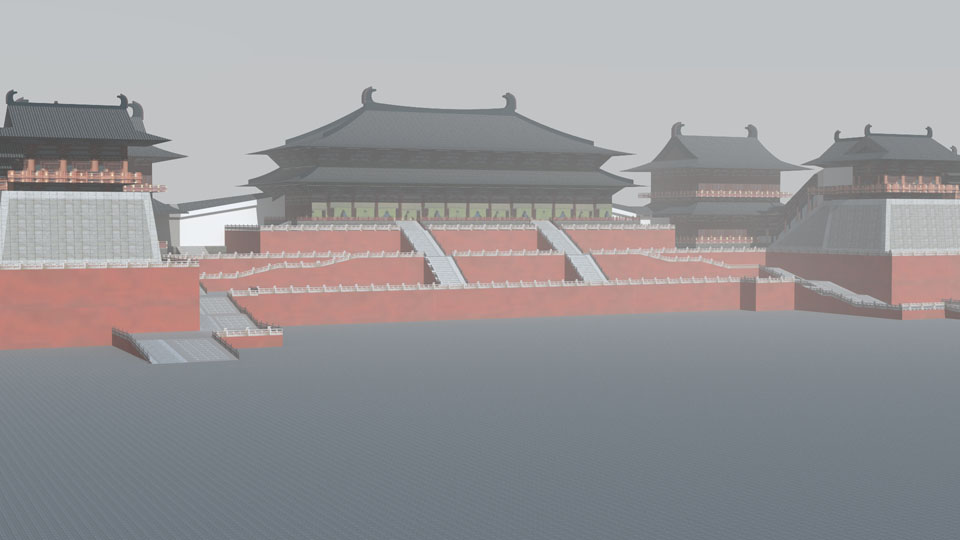
Archaeological evidence shows that the Daming Palace platforms were painted in rose red as opposed to the deep red of the later Forbidden City.

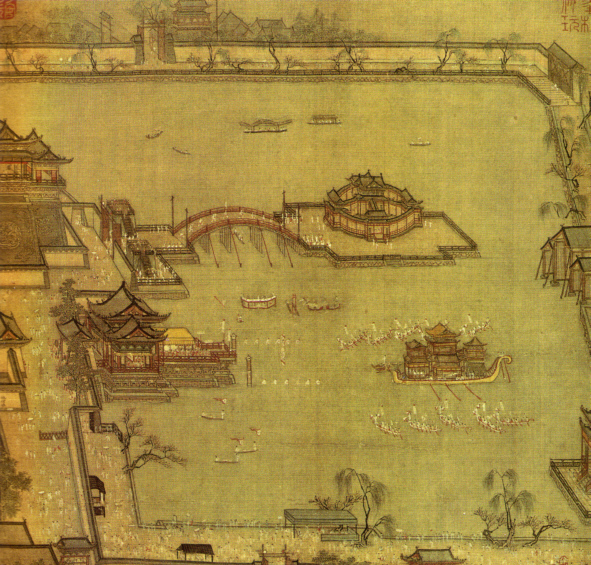
Games taking place in Northern Song palace gardens (c.10th century). These imperial 'backyards' often came with grand artificial lakes and man-made islands.

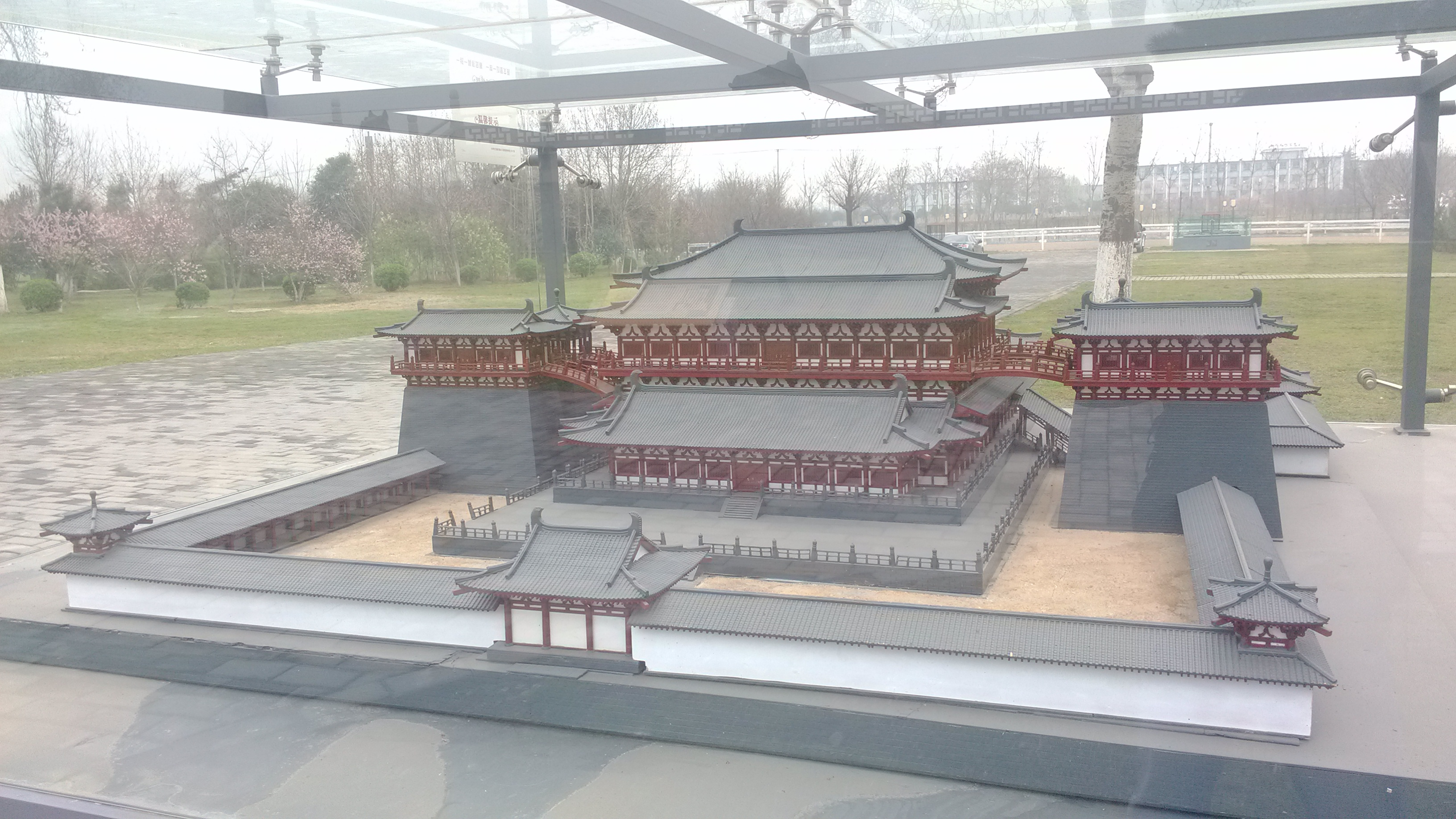
Linde Hall of Daming Palace, used for recreational purposes and the entertaining foreign embassies.

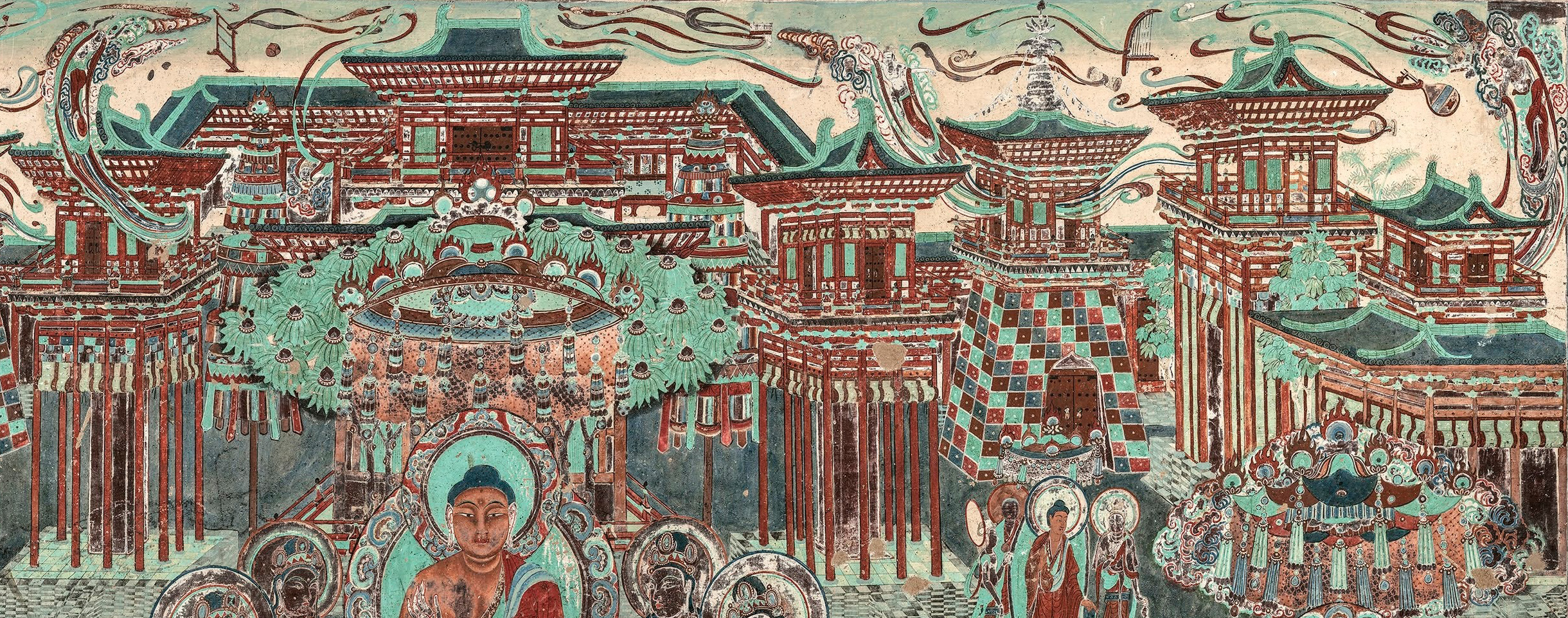
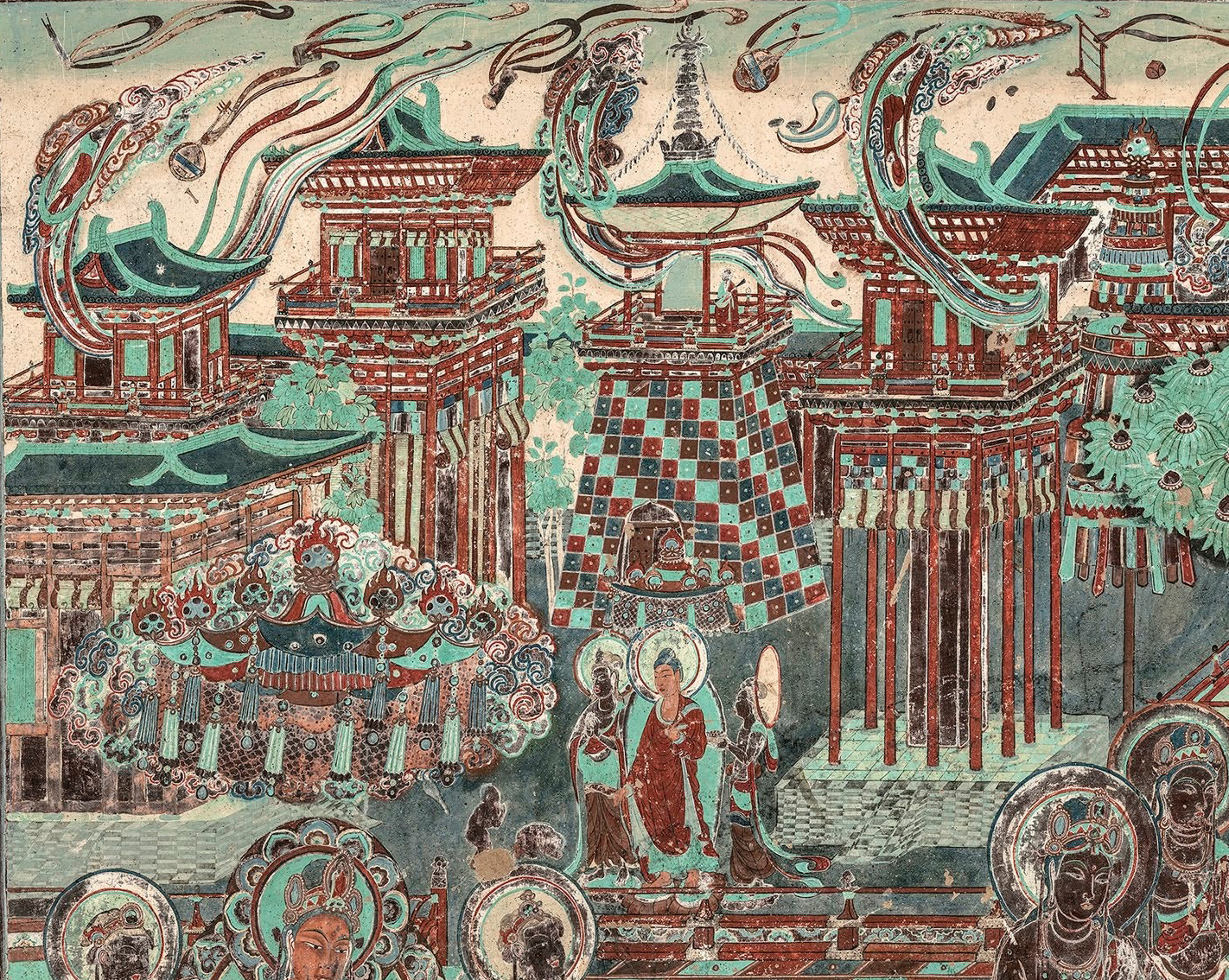
Frescoes depicting Tang architecture from the Mogao Cave.

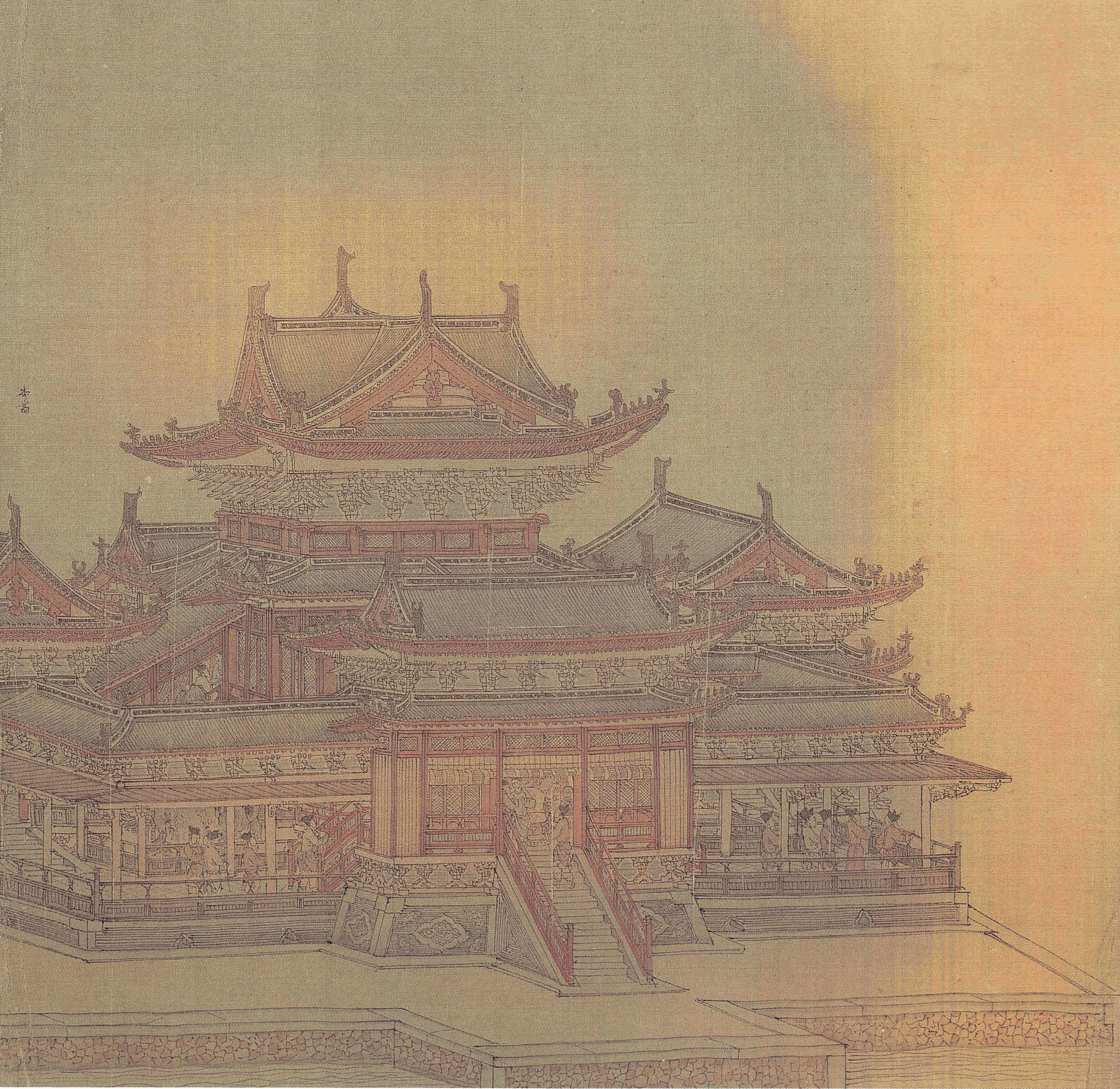
Song palaces are known to be less grand than both its predecessors and successors, this was due to the relatively egalitarian zeitgeist and policies of the period (see Culture of the Song dynasty).

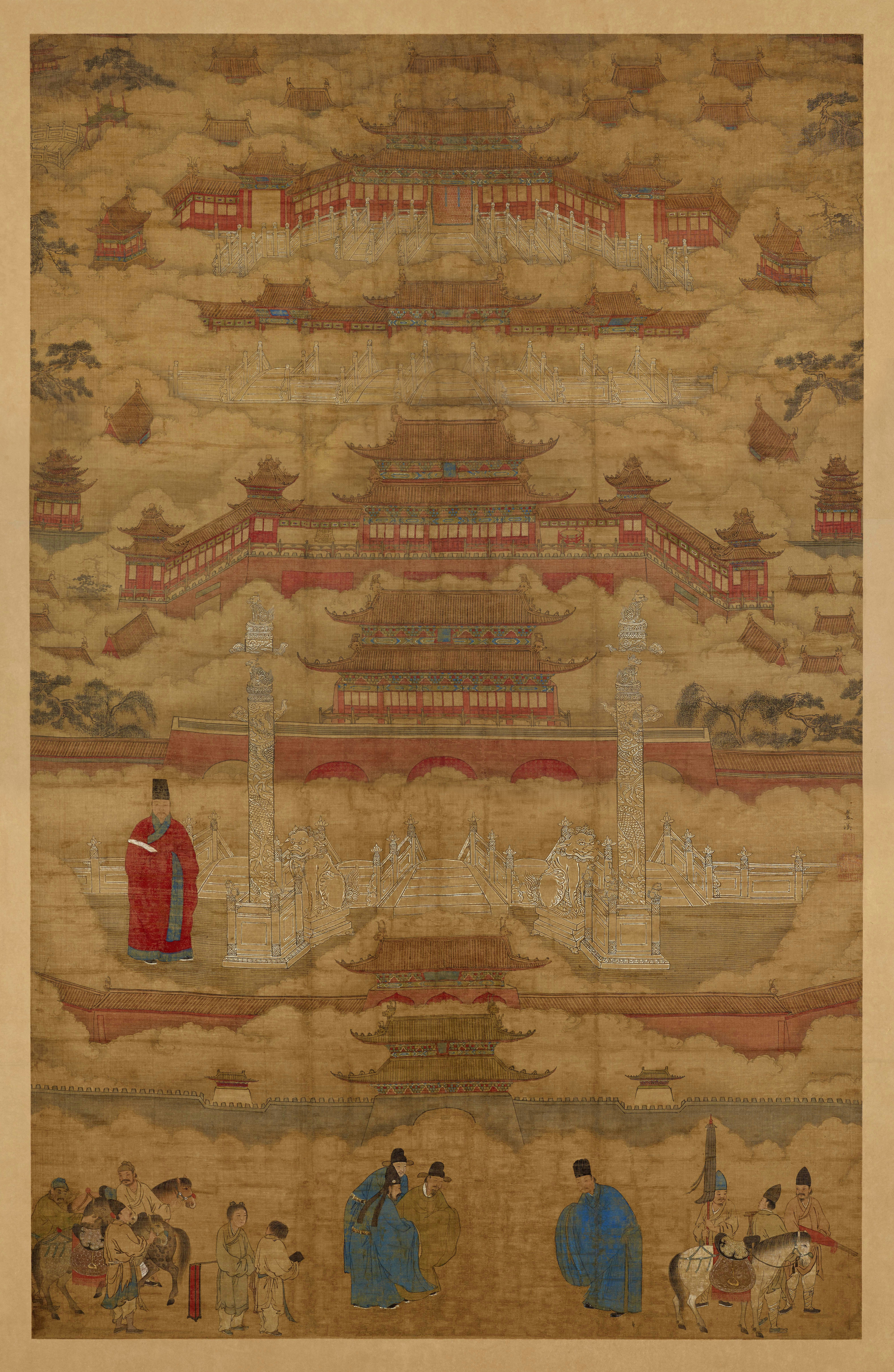
The Forbidden City as depicted in a Ming painting. Despite significant changes in architectural details, palaces' general layout remained somewhat constant.

- Xianyang Palace (咸陽宮), in (Qin) Xianyang (咸陽), now 15 km/9 miles east of modern Xianyang, Shaanxi province: this was the royal palace of the state of Qin before the Chinese unification, and then the palace of the First Emperor when China was unified. Burnt down by Xiang Yu after the fall of the Qin dynasty.
- Epang Palace (阿房宮 - probable meaning: "The Palace on the Hill"), 20 km/12 miles south of (Qin) Xianyang (咸陽), now 15 km/9 miles west of Xi'an (西安), Shaanxi province: the imperial palace built by the First Emperor in replacement of Xianyang Palace. Traditionally said to be burnt down by Xiang Yu, but may not have been completed at the fall of the Qin dynasty.
- Weiyang Palace (未央宮 - "The Endless Palace"), in (Han) Chang'an (長安), now 7 km/4 miles northeast of downtown Xi'an (西安), Shaanxi province: imperial palace of the Western Han dynasty for two centuries. This is the largest palace ever built on Earth, covering 4.8 km^{2} (1,200 acres), which is 6.7 times the size of the Forbidden City, or 11 times the size of the Vatican City. Used after the Han dynasty, rebuilt in the Tang dynasty.
- Southern Palace (南宮) and Northern Palace (北宮), in Luoyang (洛陽), Henan province: imperial palaces of the Eastern Han dynasty for two centuries, the Southern Palace being used for court hearings and audiences, the Northern Palace being the private residence of the emperor and his concubines. Demolished by Dong Zhuo at the end of the Han dynasty.
- Taiji Palace (太極宮 - "Palace of the Supreme Ultimate"), also known as the Western Apartments (西内), in (Tang) Chang'an (長安), now downtown Xi'an (西安), Shaanxi province: imperial palace during the Sui dynasty (who called it Daxing Palace - 大興宮, "Palace of Great Prosperity") and in the beginning of the Tang dynasty (until A.D. 663). Area: 4.2 km^{2} (1,040 acres), imperial section proper: 1.92 km^{2} (474 acres).
- Daming Palace (大明宮 - "Palace of the Great Brightness"), also known as the Eastern Apartments (東内), in (Tang) Chang'an (長安), now downtown Xi'an (西安), Shaanxi province: imperial palace of the Tang dynasty after A.D. 663 (it was briefly named Penglai Palace (蓬萊宮) between 663 and 705), but the Taiji Palace remained in use for major state ceremonies such as coronations. Area: 3.11 km^{2} (768 acres), almost 4.5 times the size of the Forbidden City.
- Kaifeng Imperial Palace (東京大内皇宮), in Dongjing (東京), now called Kaifeng (開封), Henan province: imperial palace of the Northern Song dynasty.
- Hangzhou Imperial Palace (臨安大内禁宮), in Lin'an (臨安), now called Hangzhou (杭州), Zhejiang province: imperial palace of the Southern Song dynasty, located at the Phoenix Mountain.
- Karakorum (哈拉和林), site of the imperial palace of the Mongol Empire.
- Shangdu (元上都) and Khanbaliq (元大都), locations of the imperial palaces of the Yuan dynasty.
- Ming Imperial Palace (明故宮), in Nanjing (南京), Jiangsu province: imperial palace of the Ming dynasty until 1421. Used as a source of stone and gradually demolished in the Qing dynasty and by the Taiping rebels.
- Forbidden City (紫禁城), now known in China as the Beijing Gugong (北京故宫), in Beijing (北京): imperial palace of the Ming dynasty and Qing dynasty from 1420 until 1924. Area: 720,000 m^{2} (178 acres). The Forbidden City is the world's largest palace currently in existence.
- Imperial Palace (Manchukuo) (帝宮), now known as Museum of the Imperial Palace of Manchukuo (伪满皇宫博物院), in Changchun (长春): imperial palace of the Manchukuo.
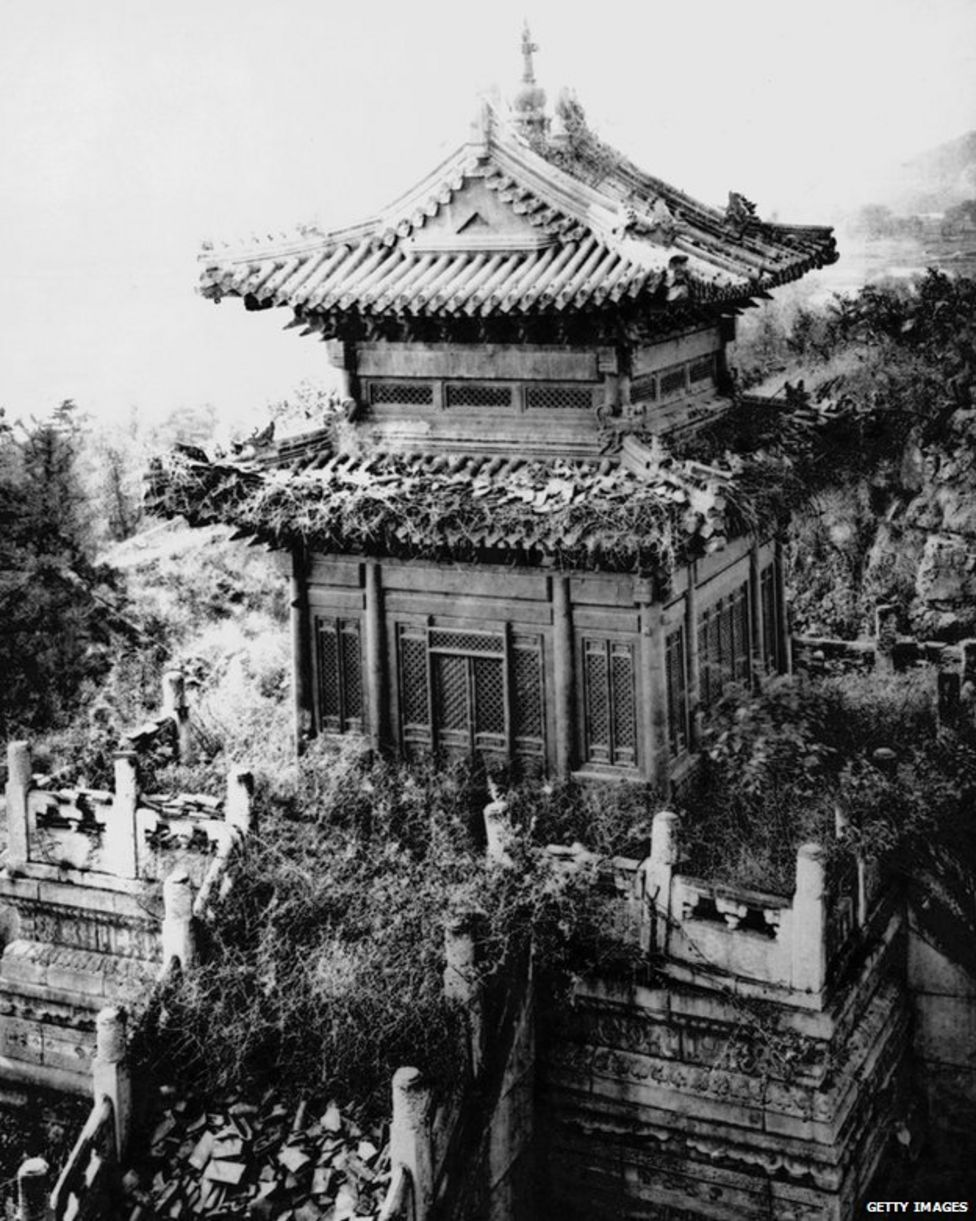
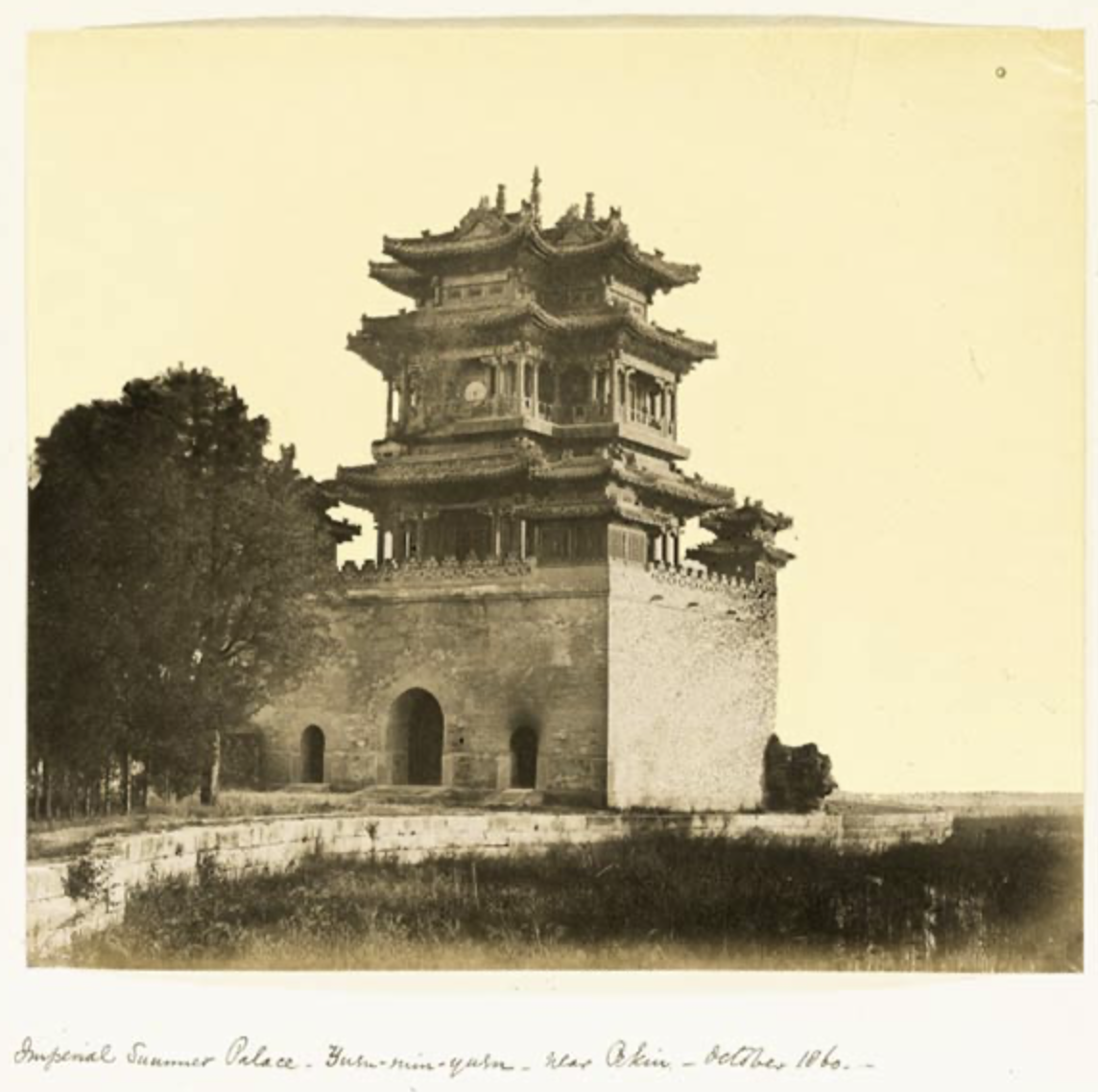
Ruins of the Old Summer Palace, 19th century, before it was completely destroyed.

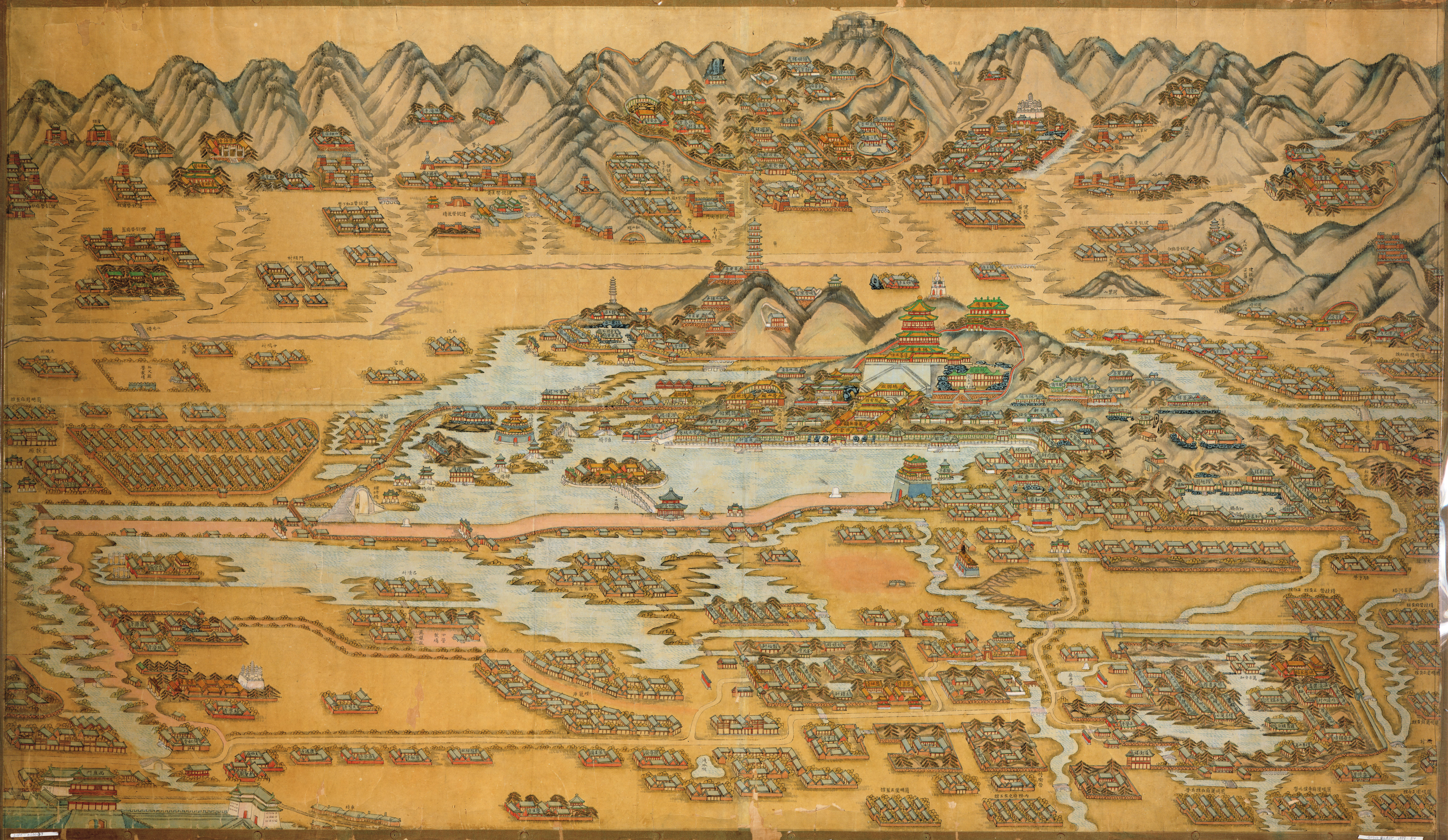
In the 1880s, a New Summer Palace was built by Empress Cixi for her 60th birthday at the expense of the National Defense treasury. Costing over 20 million taels, it was still much smaller than its predecessor.

== Other palaces ==
Apart from the main imperial palace, Chinese dynasties also had several other imperial palaces in the capital city where the empress, crown prince, or other members of the imperial family dwelled. There also existed palaces outside of the capital city called "away palaces" (離宮) where the emperors resided when traveling.

=== Imperial gardens ===
The habit also developed of building garden estates in the countryside surrounding the capital city, where the emperors retired at times to get away from the rigid etiquette of the imperial palace, or simply to escape from the summer heat inside their capital. This practice reached a zenith with the Qing dynasty, whose emperors built the fabulous Imperial Gardens (御園), now known in China as the Gardens of Perfect Brightness (圓明園), and better known in English as the Old Summer Palace. The emperors of the Qing dynasty resided and worked in the Imperial Gardens, 8 km/5 miles outside of the walls of Beijing, the Forbidden City inside Beijing being used only for formal ceremonies.

These gardens were made up of three gardens: the Garden of Perfect Brightness proper, the Garden of Eternal Spring (長春園), and the Elegant Spring Garden (綺春園); they covered a huge area of 3.5 km^{2} (865 acres), almost 5 times the size of the Forbidden City, and 8 times the size of the Vatican City. comprising hundreds of halls, pavilions, temples, galleries, gardens, lakes, etc. Several famous landscapes of southern China had been reproduced in the Imperial Gardens, hundreds of invaluable Chinese art masterpieces and antiquities were stored in the halls, making the Imperial Gardens one of the largest museums in the world. Some unique copies of literary work and compilations were also stored inside the Imperial Gardens.

In 1860, during the Second Opium War, the British and French expeditionary forces looted the Old Summer Palace. Then on October 18, 1860, in order to "punish" the imperial court, which had refused to allow Western embassies inside Beijing, the British general Lord Elgin- with protestations from the French - purposely ordered the torching of this massive complex which burned to the ground. It took 3500 British troops to set the entire place ablaze and took three whole days to burn. The burning of the Gardens of Perfect Brightness is still a very sensitive issue in China today.

Following this cultural catastrophe, the imperial court was forced to relocate to the old and austere Forbidden City where it stayed until 1924, when the Last Emperor was expelled by a republican army.

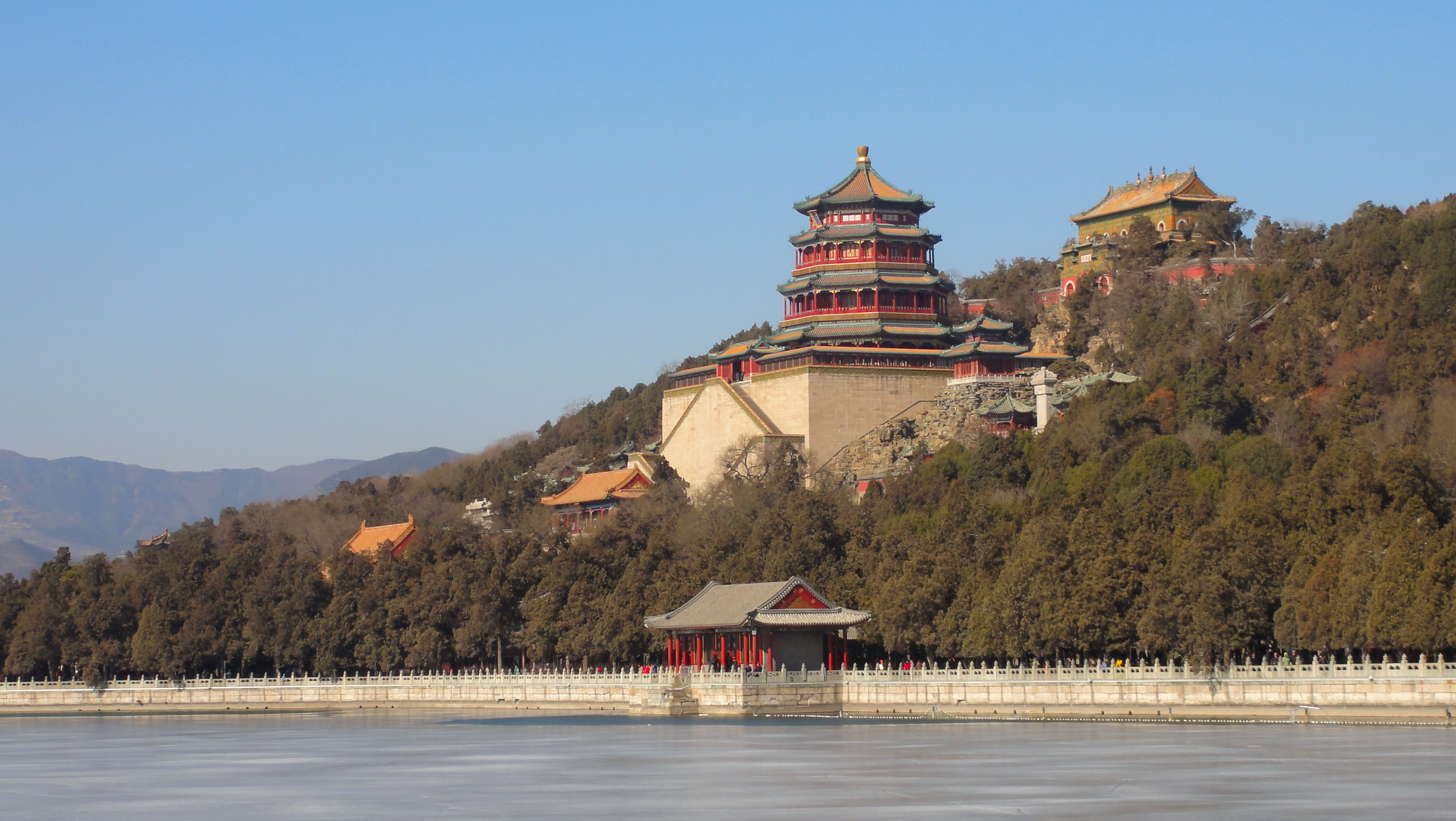
Foxiang Ge (Tower of Buddhist Incense) at Wanshou Shan (Longevity Hill)

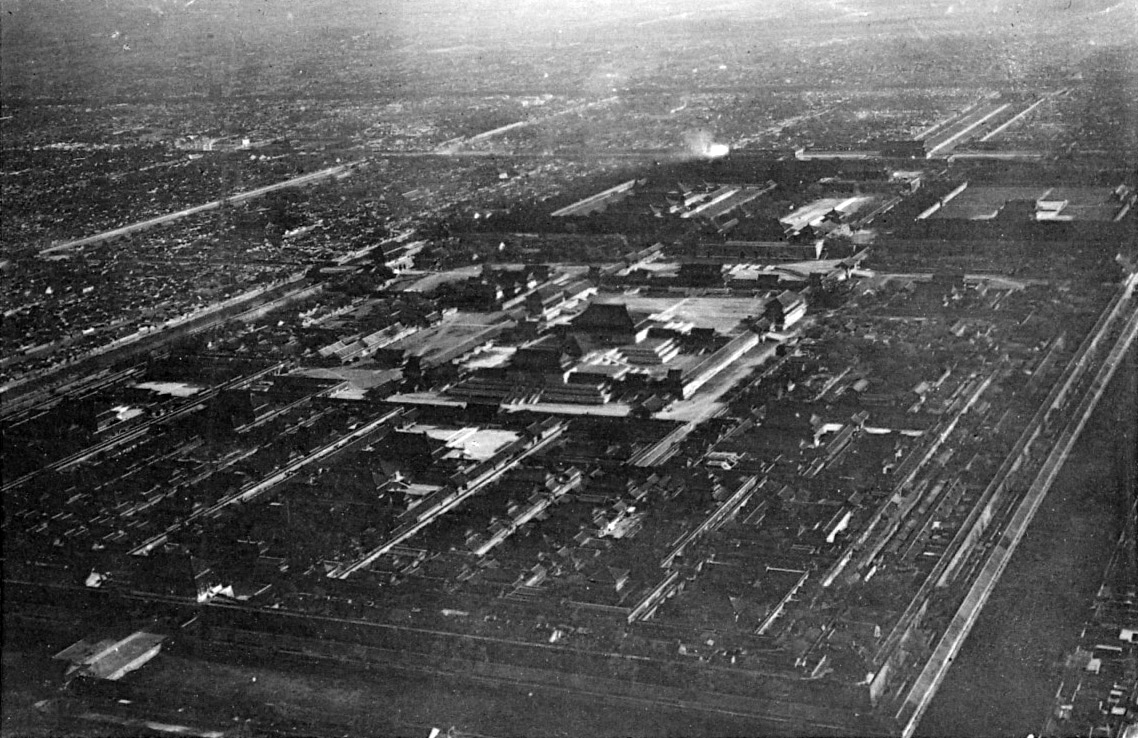
Aerial view of the Forbidden City (1900–1901).

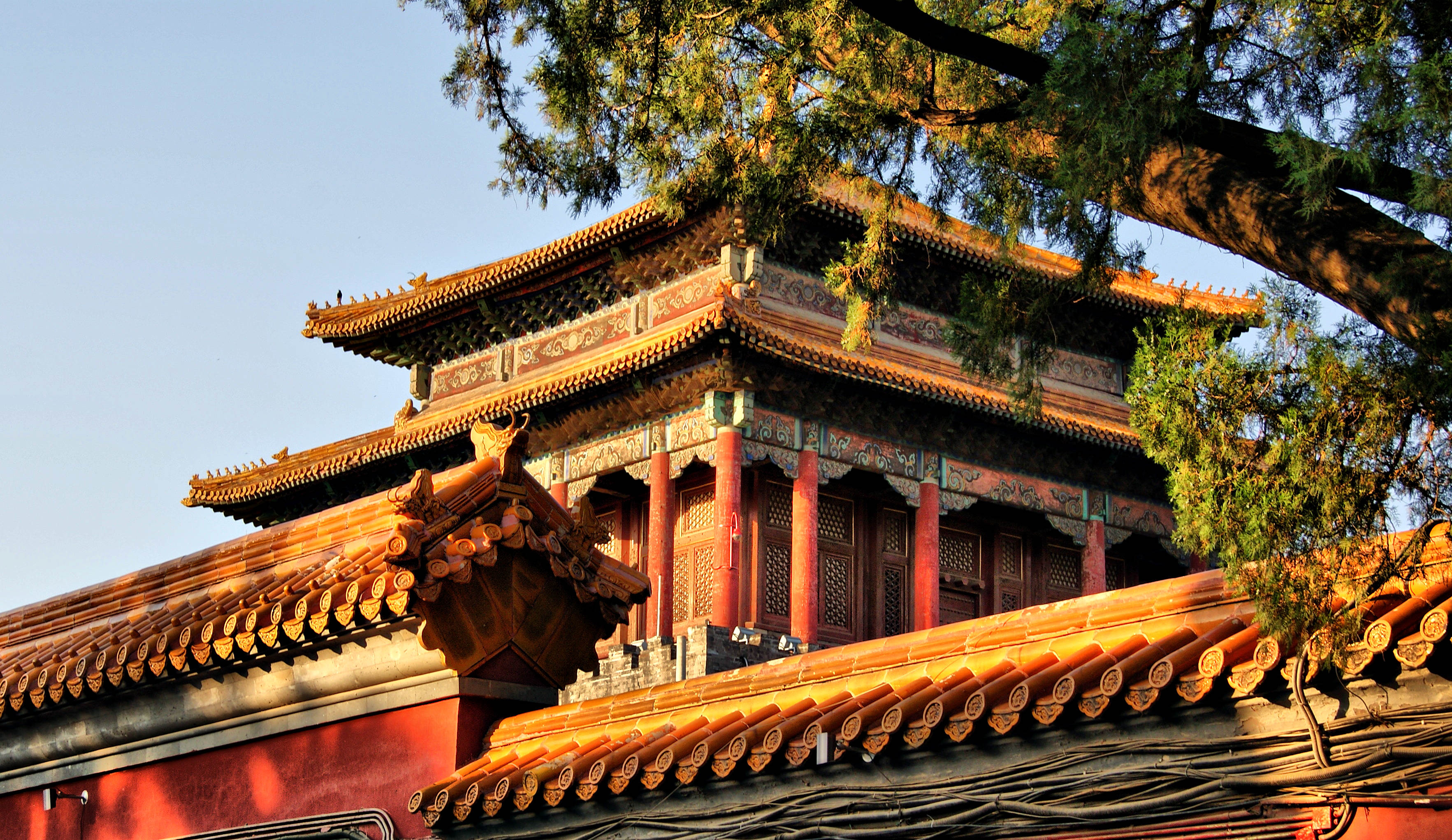
Close-up on the left protruding wing of the Meridian Gate

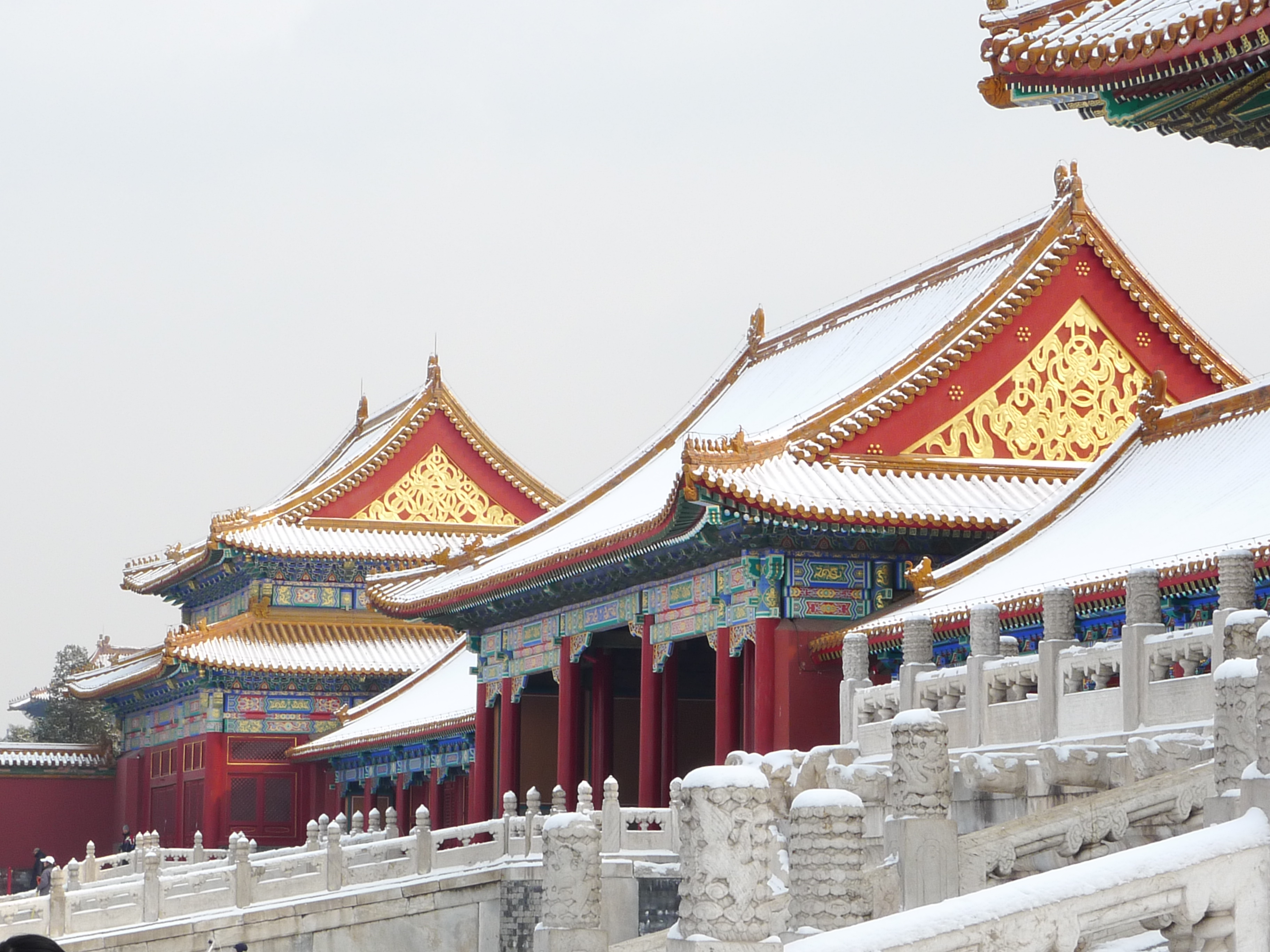
Gate of Manifest Virtue

=== Summer Palace ===
Empress dowager Cixi (慈禧太后) built the Summer Palace or Yiheyuan (頤和園 - "The Garden of Nurtured Harmony") near the Old Summer Palace, but on a much smaller scale than the Old Summer Palace.

=== More palaces ===
Some other palaces include:

- Beihai and Zhongnanhai in Beijing
- Mukden Palace in Shenyang
- Mountain Resort at Chengde
- Taicheng in Nanjing
- Genyue in Kaifeng
- Changle Palace in Chang'an
- Shanglinyuan in Chang'an
- Xingqing Palace in Chang'an
- Potala Palace in Lhasa was used by the Dalai Lama

Recently, Chinese archaeologists have announced that they have found the ruins of an ancient Chinese palace in Dadiwan.

== See also ==
- Historical capitals of China
- Chinese architecture
