= Ajige =

Manchu prince (1605–1651)

- Prince Ying of the First Rank 和碩英親王

Head of the House of Prince Ying peerage
- Tenure: 1636–1651
- Predecessor: peerage created
- Successor: Cokto
- Born: 28 August 1605
- Died: 28 November 1651 (aged 46)
- Consorts: Lady Sirin Gioro; Lady Borjigit
- Issue: Hedu; Fulehe; Laoqin; Bo'erxun; Louqin; Mo'erxun; Tongsai; Huli; Ebai; Banjintai
Names
- Aisin Gioro Ajige (愛新覺羅 阿濟格)
- House: Aisin Gioro
- Father: Nurhaci
- Mother: Empress Xiaoliewu

Ajige
- Traditional Chinese: 阿濟格
- Simplified Chinese: 阿济格
Transcriptions
Standard Mandarin
- Hanyu Pinyin: Ājìgé

Prince Ying
- Traditional Chinese: 英親王
- Simplified Chinese: 英亲王
Transcriptions
Standard Mandarin
- Hanyu Pinyin: Yīng Qīnwáng

Ajige (Manchu:ᠠᠵᡳᡤᡝ, Mölendroff: ajige; 28 August 1605 – 28 November 1651) was a Manchu prince and military general of the early Qing dynasty. He was born in the Aisin Gioro clan as the 12th son of Nurhaci, the khan of the Later Jin dynasty (the precursor of the Qing dynasty).

Ajige was conferred the title "Prince Wuying of the Second Rank" (武英郡王) in 1636, before being promoted to "Prince Ying of the First Rank" in 1644. He was involved in the Manchu conquest of the Ming dynasty. After the death of Dorgon, Ajige attempted to seize the position of Prince-Regent (previously held by Dorgon), but was discovered and placed under arrest. He was forced to commit suicide by the Shunzhi Emperor in 1651.

== Physical Appearance ==
According to the account of Japanese travellers, Ajige was a stalwart, valiant and hot-tempered warrior who had been through numerous battles, and that he had eyes that looked abnormally ferocious.

== Family ==
Primary Consort

- First primary consort, of the Sirin Gioro clan (嫡妻 西林覺羅氏)
  - Hedu, Prince of the Fourth Rank (貝子 和度; 14 December 1619 – 13 November 1646), first son
- Second primary consort, of the Khorchin Borjigit clan (繼妻 博爾濟吉特氏)
  - Fulehe, Duke of the First Rank (鎮國公 傅勒赫; 9 January 1629 – 11 May 1660), second son
  - Louqin, Prince of the First Rank (親王 樓親; 9 November 1634 – 25 November 1661), sixth son
  - Mo'erxun (墨爾遜; b. 4 August 1635), seventh son

Concubine

- Mistress, of the Li clan (李氏)
  - Suo'erke (索爾科; 16 February 1640 – 12 June 1642), eighth son
- Mistress, of the Yu clan (愉氏)
- Unknown
  - Princess of the Third Rank (郡主), first daughter
    - married Ebilun (遏必隆) of the Niohuru, son of Eidu and Princess Mukushen, and had issues.
  - Laoqin, Prince of the Second Rank (郡王 勞親; d. 28 November 1651), third son
  - Bo'erxun (伯爾遜; 3 February 1631 – 15 November 1675), fourth son
  - Menzhu (門柱; 4 July 1633 – 23 September 1635), fifth son
  - Fifth daughter (1637–1694)
    - Married Mingju (1635–1708) of the Manchu Yehe Nara clan, and had issue (Xingde)
  - Tongsai (佟塞; 29 April 1641 – 8 November 1701), ninth son
  - Huli (瑚禮; b. 13 August 1641), tenth son
  - Ebai (鄂拜; 20 March 1643 – 13 September 1689), 11th son
  - Banjintai (班進泰; 27 May 1644 – 22 August 1706), 12th son

== Ancestry ==
Fuman
Giocangga (1526–1583)
Empress Zhi
Taksi (1543–1583)
Empress Yi
Nurhaci (1559–1626)
Cancha
Agu
Empress Xuan (d. 1569)
Ajige (1605–1651)
Buyan
Bugan
Mantai (d. 1596)
Empress Xiaoliewu (1590–1626)

== See also ==
- Prince Ying (英)
- Royal and noble ranks of the Qing dynasty
- Ranks of imperial consorts in China § Qing
