= Prince Ying (created 1644) =

Prince Ying of the First Rank

Chinese name
- Traditional Chinese: 和碩英親王
- Simplified Chinese: 和硕英亲王
Transcriptions
Standard Mandarin
- Hanyu Pinyin: héshuò yīng qīnwáng
- Wade–Giles: ho-shuo ying ch'in-wang

Manchu name
- Manchu script: ᡥᠣᡧᠣᡳ ᠪᠠᡨᡠᡵᡠ ᠴᡳᠨ ᠸᠠᠩ
- Romanization: hošoi baturu cin wang

Prince Ying of the First Rank, or simply Prince Ying, was the title of a princely peerage used in China during the Manchu-led Qing dynasty (1644–1912). As the Prince Ying peerage was not awarded "iron-cap" status, this meant that each successive bearer of the title would normally start off with a title downgraded by one rank vis-à-vis that held by his predecessor. However, the title would generally not be downgraded to any lower than a feng'en fuguo gong except under special circumstances.

The first bearer of the title was Ajige (1605–1651), the 12th son of Nurhaci, the founder of the Qing dynasty. In 1644, Ajige was granted the title "Prince Ying of the First Rank" by his nephew, the Shunzhi Emperor. However, in 1651, he was stripped of his title and forced to commit suicide after his failed attempt to seize the position of Prince-Regent after Dorgon's death. The peerage was passed down over 12 generations and held by 15 persons.

== Members of the Prince Ying peerage ==
Members of the Prince Ying peerage
- Ajige (1st), Nurhaci's 12th son, initially a beile, made a second-rank prince in 1636 under the title "Prince Wuying of the Second Rank" (武英郡王), promoted to "Prince Ying of the First Rank" in 1644, stripped of his title and forced to commit suicide in 1651
  - Fulehe (傅勒赫; 1629–1660), Ajige's second son, posthumously honoured as a grace defender duke' in 1662
    - Chuokedu (綽克都; 1651 – 1711) (2nd), Fulehe's third son, held the title of a grace defender duke from 1665 to 1698, stripped of his title in 1698
      - Xingshou (興綬; 1689 – 1724), Chuokedu's seventh son, posthumously honoured as a grace bulwark duke
        - Jiucheng (九成; 1710 – 1766) (7th), Xingshou's eldest son, held the title of a grace bulwark duke from 1746 to 1761, stripped of his title in 1761
          - Qiande (謙德; 1749–1767) (8th), Jiucheng's fourth son, held the title of a third class defender general from 1761 to 1767, had no male heir
          - Shunde (順德; 1754 – 1800) (9th), Jiucheng's seventh son, held the title of a grace general from 1767 to 1796
            - Huaying (華英; 1784 – 1831) (10th), Shunde's eldest son, held the title of a grace general from 1796 to 1830, stripped of his title in 1830
      - Puzhao (普照; 1691 – 1724) (3rd), Chuokedu's eighth son, held the title of a grace bulwark duke from 1698 to 1713, stripped of his title in 1713
      - Jingzhao (經照; 169 8– 1744) (4th), Chuokedu's ninth son, held the title of a grace bulwark duke from 1713 to 1732, stripped of his title in 1732
      - Longde (隆德; 1672 – 1733), Chuokedu's son
        - Luda (璐達; 1705 – 1741) (5th), Longde's second son, held the title of a grace bulwark duke from 1732 to 1741, posthumously honoured as Grace Bulwark Duke Gongjian (奉恩輔國恭簡公)
          - Linkui (麟魁; 1726 – 1769) (6th), Luda's eldest son, held the title of a grace bulwark duke from 1741 to 1745, stripped of his title in 1745
      - Hutuli (瑚圖禮; 1688 – 1746), Chuokedu's son
        - E'erheyi (額爾赫宜; 1743 – 1790), Hutuli's son
          - Shuochen (碩臣; 1772 – 1819), E'erheyi's son
            - Huade (華德; 1789 – 1847) (11th), Shuochen's eldest son, held the title of a grace general from 1831 to 1847
              - Xiuping (秀平; 1811 – 1855) (12th), Huade's eldest son, held the title of a grace general from 1848 to 1855
                - Liangzhe (良喆; 1842 – 1890) (13th), Xiuping's second son, held the title of a grace general from 1855 to 1890
                  - Longxu (隆煦; 1866 – 1909) (14th), Liangzhe's second son, held the title of a grace general from 1890 to 1909
                    - Cunyao (存耀; b. 1899) (15th), Longxu's eldest son, held the title of a grace general from 1910
                      - Tieqin (鐵欽; b. 1922), Cunyao's son

=== Cadet line ===
==== Ajige's line ====
Ajige's line
- Hedu (和度; 1619 – 1646), Ajige's eldest son, initially held the title of a grace bulwark duke, promoted to beizi in 1644, had no male heir
- Fulehe (傅勒赫; 1629–1660), Ajige's second son, posthumously honoured as a grace defender duke' in 1662
  - Gouzi (構孳; died 1666), Fulehe's second son, held the title of a grace bulwark duke from 1661 to 1666
    - Nayan (訥延), Gouzi's son, held the title of a defender general from 1666 to 1667, had no male heir
- Louqin (樓親; 1634 – 1661), Ajige's sixth son, held the title of a first-rank prince but was stripped of his title later and forced to commit suicide

==== Chuodeku's line ====
Chuodeku's line
- Suyan (素嚴; died 1692), Chuokedu's eldest son, held the title of a grace bulwark duke from 1682 to 1692
  - Subai (素拜; died 1695), Suyan's third son, held the title of a third class defender general from 1692 to 1695, had no male heir

==== Puzhao's line ====
- Hengxin (亨新), Puzhao's son, held the title of a grace bulwark duke from 1724 to 1732, stripped of his title in 1732

== Family tree ==
Family tree

Ajige 阿濟格 (1605–1651); Prince Ying 英親王 (1644–1651) (stripped of his title)
Fulehe 傅勒赫 (1629–1660); Feng'en Zhenguo Gong 奉恩鎮國公 (posthumously awarded)
Chuokedu 綽克都 (1651–1711); Feng'en Zhenguo Gong 奉恩鎮國公 (1665–1698) (stripped of his title)
Longde 隆德 (1672–1733)	Hutuli 瑚圖禮 (1688–1746)	Xingshou 興綬 (1689–1724); Feng'en Fuguo Gong 奉恩輔國公 (posthumously awarded)	Puzhao 普照 (1691–1724); Feng'en Fuguo Gong 奉恩輔國公 (1698–1713) (stripped of his title)	Jingzhao 經照 (1698–1744); Feng'en Fuguo Gong 奉恩輔國公 (1713–1732) (stripped of his title)
Luda 璐達 (1705–1741); Feng'en Fuguo Gongjian Gong 奉恩輔國恭簡公 (1732–1741)	E'erheyi 額爾赫宜 (1743–1790)	Jiucheng 九成 (1710–1766); Feng'en Fuguo Gong 奉恩輔國公 (1746–1761)
Linkui 麟魁 (1726–1769); Feng'en Fuguo Gong 奉恩輔國公 (1741–1745) (stripped of his title)	Shuochen 碩臣 (1772–1819)	Qiande 謙德 (1749–1767); Third Class Zhenguo Jiangjun 三等鎮國將軍 (1761–1767)	Shunde 順德 (1754–1800); Feng'en Jiangjun 奉恩將軍 (1767–1796)
Huade 華德 (1789–1847); Feng'en Jiangjun 奉恩將軍 (1831–1847)	Huaying 華英 (1784–1831); Feng'en Jiangjun 奉恩將軍 (1796–1830) (stripped of his title)
Xiuping 秀平 (1811–1855); Feng'en Jiangjun 奉恩將軍 (1848–1855)
Liangzhe 良喆 (1842–1890); Feng'en Jiangjun 奉恩將軍 (1855–1890)
Longxu 隆煦 (1866–1909); Feng'en Jiangjun 奉恩將軍 (1890–1909)
Cunyao 存耀 (1899–?); Feng'en Jiangjun 奉恩將軍 (1910–?)
Tieqin 鐵欽 (1922–?)

== See also ==
- Royal and noble ranks of the Qing dynasty
