= Mukden Palace =

Shenyang Imperial Palace Museum 沈阳故宫
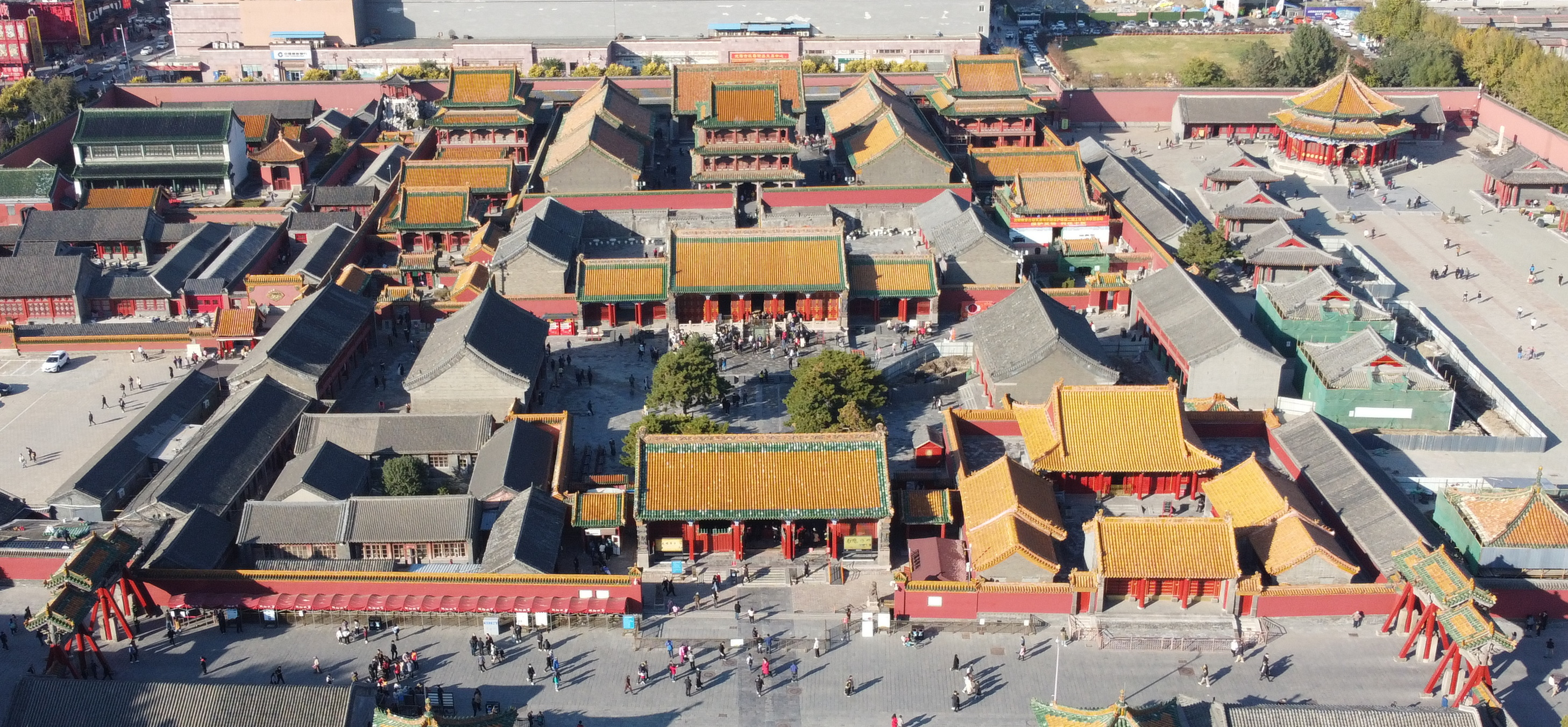
- Bird's-eye view of the Mukden Palace

- Location within Liaoning Location within China
- Established: 1955
- Location: No. 171, Shenyang Road, Shenhe District, Shenyang, Liaoning
- Coordinates: 41.796161°N 123.450708°E
- Type: Art museum, Imperial Palace, Historic site
- Visitors: 1.6 million
- Curator: Bin Wu

History
- Built: 1625, 1631, 1780

Site notes
- Area: 6 hectares
- Architect(s): Nurhachi, Hong Taiji, Qianlong Emperor
- Architectural style: Chinese architecture
- Website: en.sypm.org.cn (English language version) www.sypm.org.cn/index2.html (Chinese language version)

UNESCO World Heritage Site
- Part of: Imperial Palaces of the Ming and Qing Dynasties in Beijing and Shenyang
- Criteria: Cultural: i, ii, iii, iv
- Reference: 439bis-002
- Inscription: 1987 (11th Session)
- Extensions: 2004

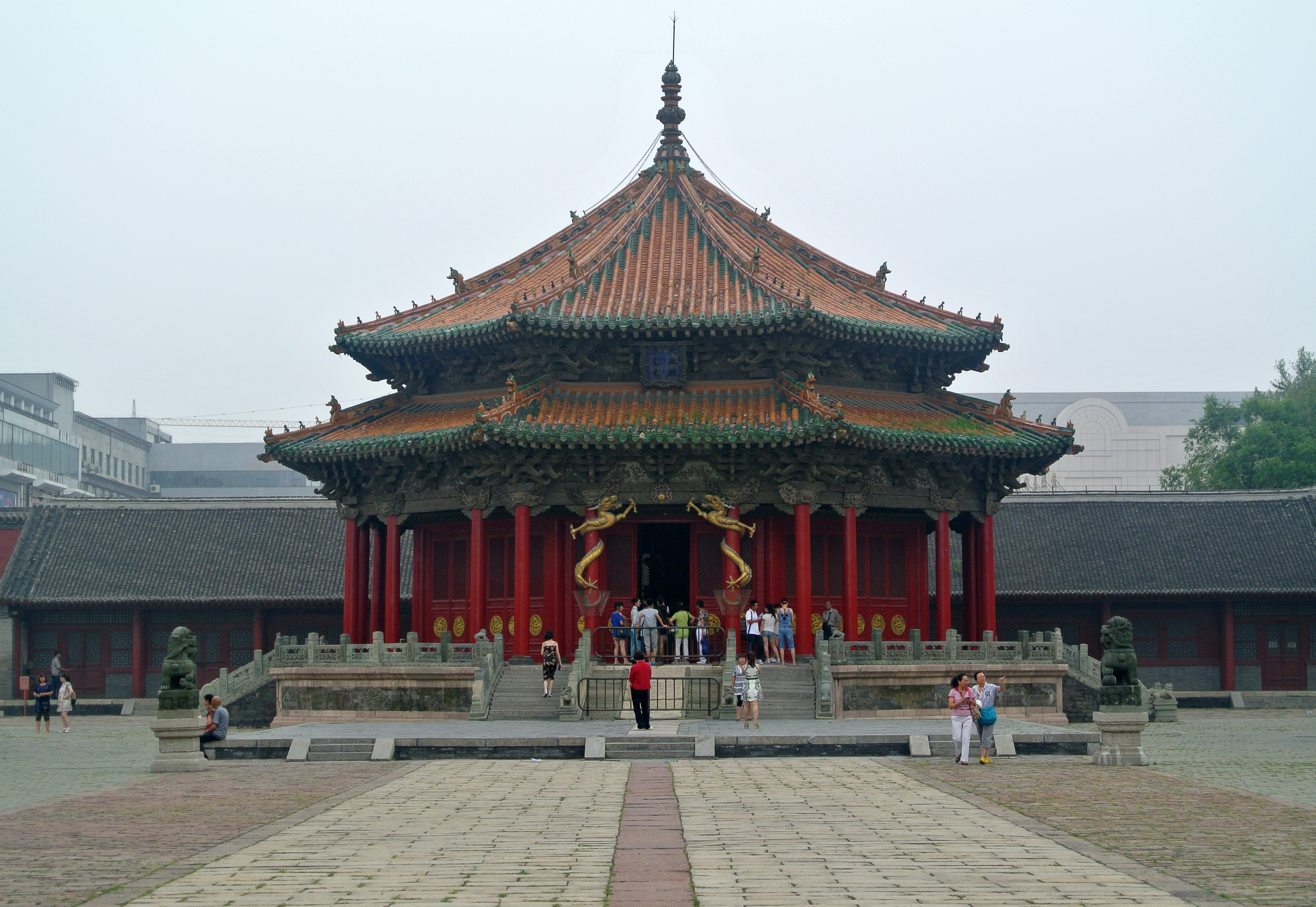
Dazheng Hall, the earliest building in the palace

Mukden Palace (simplified Chinese: 盛京宫殿; traditional Chinese: 盛京宮殿; pinyin: Shèngjīng Gōngdiàn), or Shenyang Imperial Palace (simplified Chinese: 沈阳故宫; traditional Chinese: 瀋陽故宮; pinyin: Shěnyáng Gùgōng), is the former palace of the Later Jin dynasty and the early Qing dynasty. It was built in 1625, and the first three Qing emperors lived there from 1625 to 1644. Since the collapse of imperial rule in China, the palace has been converted to a museum that now lies in the center of Shenyang, Liaoning.

== History ==
Early construction began in 1625 by Nurhaci, the founder of the Later Jin dynasty. By 1631, additional structures were added during the reign of Nurhaci's successor, Hong Taiji.

The Mukden Palace was built to resemble the Forbidden City in Beijing. However, the palace also exhibits hints of Manchu and Tibetan architectural styles.

After the Qing dynasty replaced the Ming dynasty in 1644 in Beijing, the Mukden Palace lost its status as the official residence of the Qing Emperor. Instead, the Mukden Palace became a regional palace.

In 1780, the Qianlong Emperor further expanded the palace. Successive Qing emperors usually stayed at the Mukden Palace for some time each year.

In 1928, the Museum of Three Eastern Provinces was found in the Mukden Palace, it was later renamed Fengtian Old Palace Museum in 1932 but closed in 1936.

In 1934, the Monument to the Imperial Reign of Manchukuo was built at the southwestern corner of the Mukden Palace, based on the same design that was already built in Hsinking (now Changchun), it was demolished in 1945.

In 1955, the Mukden Palace was converted into the Shenyang Imperial Palace Museum.

In 2004, it was included in the UNESCO World Heritage List as an extension of the Imperial Palace of the Ming and Qing Dynasties, or Forbidden City, in Beijing.

== Structure ==
The Mukden Palace covers an area of around 60,000 square metres, with over 300 buildings and 20 courtyards. According to its layout, it can be divided into three parts: East Section, Middle Section and West Section, with the Middle Section as the main body. The East and West Sections were built in the Nurhaci Period. The layout of the buildings from the Eight Banners system in the East Section is a unique feature of the Mukden Palace. It combines architectural features of the Manchu, Han and Mongol peoples.

The main part of the Middle Section is located in the centre of the ancient city of Shenyang, built in the Hong Taiji period. The buildings are arranged on a central axis with a number of symmetrical out-buildings on either side. The West Road building was built in 1783.

This structure has a strict functional division with a clear distinction between primary and secondary status buildings, the overall composition displays distinct Manchu living features.

=== East Section ===
The Dazheng Hall (大政殿) and the Ten Princes' Pavilions (十王亭) were built during the Nurhaci period. It was completed in 1625 and was the place where the emperor held the "Great Ceremony" as well as the office of the Eight Banners Ministry. Dazheng Temple is an octagonal heavy-duty building with a yellow glazed tile and green trimming, 16 multicoloured glazed ridges, large wooden frame structure with Mortise and tenon joint, flying roof arch, colour paintings and dragon plates, which is the traditional architectural form of the Chinese palaces. Additionally, the decoration of Cintamani and ceilings with Sanskrit add a religious feature. The Dazheng Hall and the Ten Princes' Pavilions constitute a complete group of buildings in the East Section.

=== Middle Section ===
Daqing Gate (大清门), Chongzheng Hall (崇政殿), Fenghuang Building (凤凰楼), Qingning Palace (清宁宫), amongst others, were built from 1627 to 1635. It was the place where the emperor carried out political activities and the living palace of the royal wives. The most representative building of the middle section is the Fenghuang Building, a palace which was built on a 4-meter-tall blue-brick platform, as the place of the emperor holding banquets. While facing east the palace of Fenghuang Building is connected with a religious ritual square, the room in the west is surrounded by a Kang bed-stove, a traditional way of keeping warm in the Northern part of China. The chimney is located in the back, an architectural feature of the Manchu People.

=== West Section ===
Xitai (戏台), Jiayintang (嘉荫堂), Wenshangge (文溯阁) and Yangxizhai (仰熙斋) were built in 1782. When an emperor of the Qing dynasty was on his "East Tour" to Shengjing (Shenyang), it was the place for reading books, watching dramas and the room for storing the "Complete Library of the Four Treasuries". The entire architectural design and layout reflect the emperor's so-called "dignity" and strict feudal hierarchy. In Mukden Palace, the roof alone was worth 680,000 Tael, equivalent to the annual ration of 450,000 poor peasants.

Today, the Mukden Palace hosts a rich and precious collection of items. The Mukden Palace Museum displays a large number of artifacts, such as the sword of Nurhachi and the waist knife and antler chairs of Hong Taiji.

layout of the Mukden Palace

== Collections ==
The collections of the Mukden Palace Museum are based on the Qing imperial collection, including porcelain, enamel, lacquerware, sculpture, calligraphy and painting, weaving embroidery, etc., which has both the historical and cultural features of the early and late Qing dynasty costumes and palace art that has a rich cultural connotation and artistic value.
