= Prince Yu (豫) =

Qing dynasty peerage

Prince Yu of the First Rank
- Traditional Chinese: 和碩豫親王
- Simplified Chinese: 和硕豫亲王
Transcriptions
Standard Mandarin
- Hanyu Pinyin: héshuò yù qīnwáng
- Wade–Giles: ho-shuo yü ch'in-wang

Prince Xin of the Second Rank
- Traditional Chinese: 多羅信郡王
- Simplified Chinese: 多罗信郡王
Transcriptions
Standard Mandarin
- Hanyu Pinyin: duōluó xìn jùnwáng
- Wade–Giles: to-lo hsin chün-wang

Prince Yu of the First Rank (Manchu: ᡥᠣᡧᠣᡳ
ᡝᡵᡴᡝ
ᠴᡳᠨ ᠸᠠᠩ; hošoi erke cin wang), or simply Prince Yu, was the title of a princely peerage used in China during the Manchu-led Qing dynasty (1644–1912). It was also one of the 12 "iron-cap" princely peerages in the Qing dynasty, which meant that the title could be passed down without being downgraded.

The inaugural holder of the peerage was Dodo (1614–1649), the 15th son of the Qing dynasty's founder Nurhaci. He was created Prince Yu of the First Rank in 1636 by his half-brother Huangtaiji, who succeeded their father as the ruler. The peerage was renamed Prince Xin of the First Rank (Prince Xin) when Dodo's son, Duoni (1636–1661), inherited his father's peerage in 1649. In 1652, the Shunzhi Emperor downgraded the peerage to Prince Xin of the Second Rank. In 1778, the Qianlong Emperor restored the peerage as "Prince Yu of the First Rank". The title was passed down over ten generations and was held by 14 people: nine as Prince Yu, and five as Prince Xin.

== Members of the Prince Yu / Prince Xin peerage ==
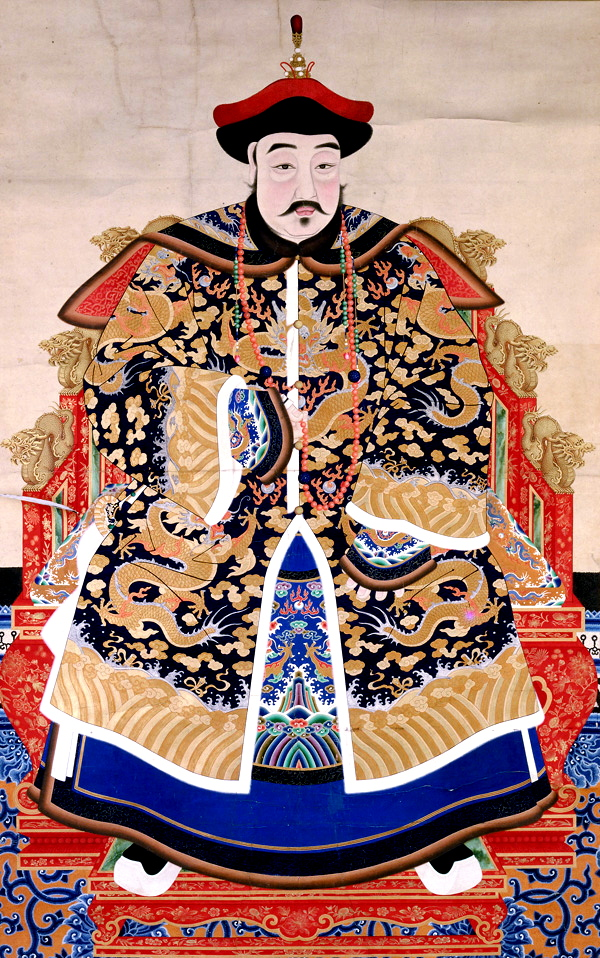
Dodo (1614–1649), the first Prince Yu

Members of the Prince Yu / Prince Xin peerage
- Dodo (1st), Nurhaci's 15th son, held the title Prince Yu of the First Rank from 1636 to 1649, posthumously honoured as Prince Yu Tong of the First Rank (豫通親王)
  - Duoni (多尼; 1636 – 1661) (2nd), Dodo's second son, held the title Prince Yu of the First Rank from 1649 to 1651 before it was renamed to Prince Xin of the First Rank and downgraded to Prince Xin of the Second Rank in 1652, posthumously honoured as Prince Yu Xuanhe of the First Rank (豫宣和親王)
    - Ezha (鄂扎; d. 1702) (3rd), Duoni's second son, held the title Prince Xin of the Second Rank from 1661 to 1702, posthumously honoured as Prince Yu of the First Rank
      - Dezhao (德昭; d. 1762) (5th), Ezha's fifth son, held the title Prince Xin of the Second Rank from 1706 to 1762, posthumously honoured as Prince Yuque of the First Rank (豫慤親王)
        - Xiuling (修齡; 1749 – 1786) (7th), Dezhao's 15th son, held the title Prince Yu of the First Rank from 1778 to 1786, posthumously honoured as Prince Yu Liang of the First Rank (豫良親王)
          - Yufeng (裕豐; 1769 – 1833) (8th), Houling's second son, held the title Prince Yu of the First Rank from 1786 to 1814, stripped of his title in 1814
          - Yuxing (裕興; 1772 – 1829), Houling's third son, held the title Prince Yu of the First Rank from 1814 to 1820, stripped of his title in 1820
          - Yuquan (裕全; d. 1840), Houling's fifth son, held the title Prince Yu of the First Rank from 1820 to 1840, posthumously honoured as Prince Yu Hou of the First Rank (豫厚親王)
            - Yidao (義道; 1819 – 1868), Yuquan's son, held the title Prince Yu of the First Rank from 1841 to 1868, posthumously honoured as Prince Yu Shen of the First Rank (豫慎親王)
              - Benge (本格; 1846 – 1898), Yidao's son, held the title Prince Yu of the First Rank from 1868 to 1898, posthumously honoured as Prince Yu Cheng of the First Rank (豫誠親王)
        - Xingling (興齡; 1726 – 1775), Dezhao's son
          - Mingxiang'a (明祥阿; 1770 – 1814), Xingling's son
            - Enrui (恩瑞; 1797 – 1850), Mingxiang'a's son
              - Shengzhao (盛照; b. 1847), Enrui's son
                - Maolin (懋林; 1892 – 1913), Shengzhao's son, adopted as Benge's son, held the title Prince Yu of the First Rank from 1899 to 1913
                  - Duanzhen (端鎮; 1909 – 1962), Maolin's son, held the title Prince Yu of the First Rank from 1913 to 1945
  - Dorbo (多爾博; 1643 – 1673), Dodo's fifth son
    - Suerfa (蘇爾發; d. 1708), Duo'erbo's second son
      - Saile (塞勒; d. 1729), Suerfa's eldest son
        - Gongyibu (功宜布; d. 1746), Saile's fifth son
          - Rusong (如松; d. 1770) (6th), Gongyibu's son, held the title Prince Xin of the Second Rank from 1762 to 1770, posthumously honoured as Prince Yuke of the First Rank (豫恪親王)
  - Dongge (董額; 1647 – 1706) (4th), Dodo's seventh son, held the title Prince Xin of the Second Rank from 1703 to 1706

== Family tree ==
Family of Prince Yu (豫)

Dodo 多鐸 (1614–1649); Prince Yutong 豫通親王 (1636–1649)
Duoni 多尼 (1636–1661); Prince Yuxuanhe 豫宣和親王 (1649–1661)	Dorbo 多爾博 (1643–1673)	Dongge 董額 (1647–1706); Prince Xin (of the Second Rank) 信郡王 (1703–1706)
Ezha 鄂扎 (died 1702); Prince Yu 豫親王 (1661–1702) (posthumously awarded)	Suerfa 蘇爾發 (died 1708)
Dezhao 德昭 (died 1762); Prince Yuque 豫慤親王 (1706–1762)	Saile 塞勒 (died 1729)
Xiuling 修齡 (1749–1786); Prince Yuliang 豫良親王 (1778–1786)	Xingling 興齡 (1726–1775)	Gongyibu 功宜布 (died 1746)
Yufeng 裕豐 (1769–1833); Prince Yu 豫親王 (1786–1814) (stripped of his title)	Yuxing 裕興 (1772–1829); Prince Yu 豫親王 (1814–1820) (stripped of his title)	Yuquan 裕全 (died 1840); Prince Yuhou 豫厚親王 (1820–1840)	Mingxiang'a 明祥阿 (1770–1814)	Rusong 如松 (died 1770); Prince Yuke 豫恪親王 (1762–1770)
Yidao 義道 (1819–1868); Prince Yushen 豫慎親王 (1841–1868)	Enrui 恩瑞 (1797–1850)
Benge 本格 (1846–1898); Prince Yucheng 豫誠親王 (1868–1898)	Shengzhao 盛照 (1847–?)
Maolin 懋林 (1892–1913); Prince Yu 豫親王 (1899–1913)
Duanzhen 端鎮 (1909–1962); Prince Yu 豫親王 (1913–1945)

Legend:

adoption

== See also ==
- Imperial and noble ranks of the Qing dynasty
