= Empress Dowager Cixi =

Regent of China from 1861 to 1908

Empress Dowager Cixi 慈禧太后
- Empress Xiaoqinxian
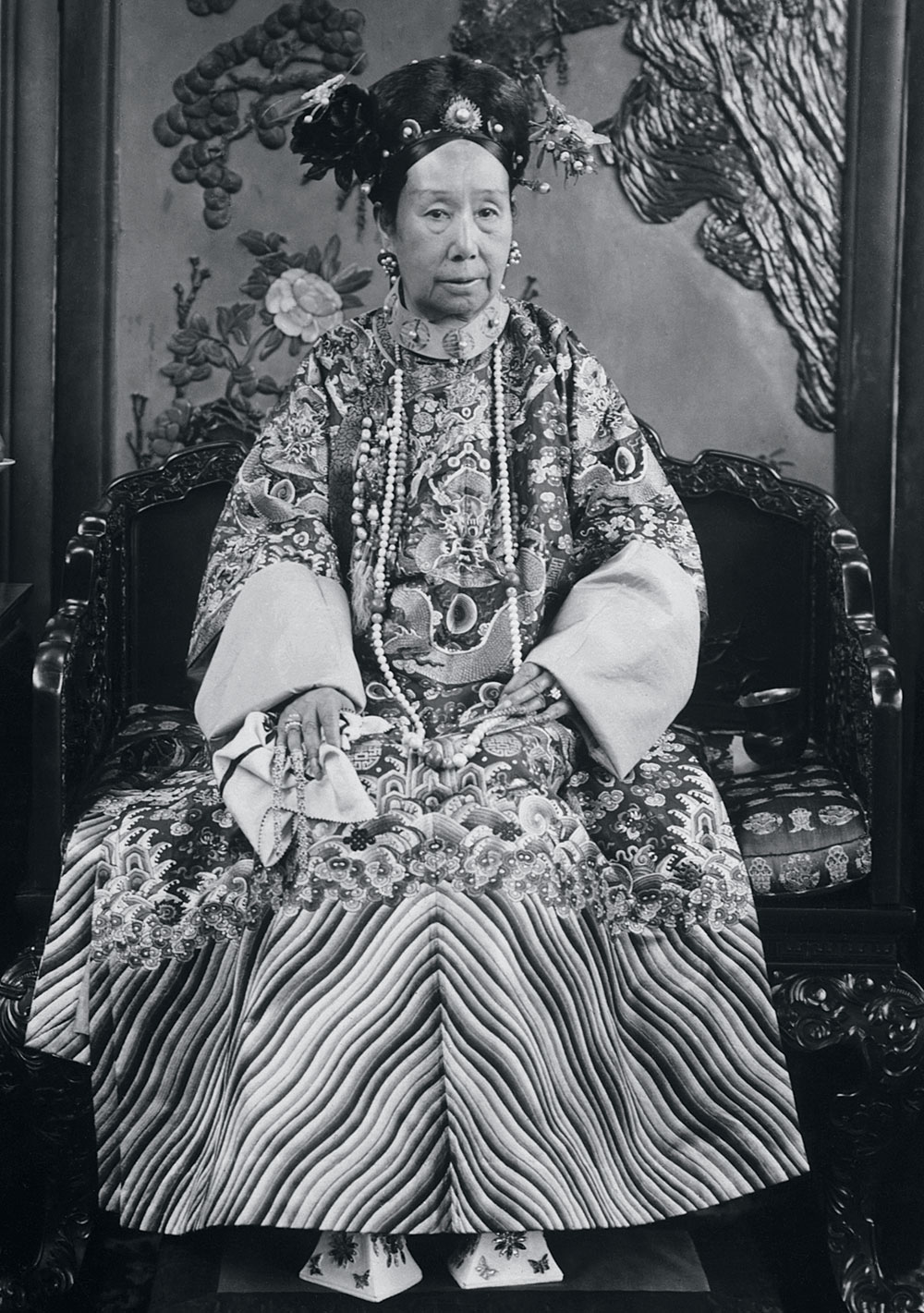
- Cixi c. 1904

Regent of the Qing dynasty
- Regency: 11 November 1861 – 23 February 1873 (11 years, 104 days)
- Monarch: Tongzhi Emperor
- Regency: 25 February 1875 – 4 March 1889 (14 years, 7 days)
- Monarch: Guangxu Emperor
- Regency: 21 September 1898 – 15 November 1908 (10 years, 55 days)
- Monarch: Guangxu Emperor

Empress dowager of the Qing dynasty
- Tenure: 23 August 1861 – 14 November 1908 (47 years, 83 days)
- Predecessor: Empress Dowager Kangci
- Successor: Empress Dowager Longyu

Grand empress dowager of the Qing dynasty
- Tenure: 14 November 1908 – 15 November 1908 (1 day)
- Predecessor: Grand Empress Dowager Zhaosheng
- Born: 29 November 1835; Peking, Qing Dynasty
- Died: 15 November 1908 (aged 72); Zhongnanhai, Beijing, China
- Burial: Ding Mausoleum, Zunhua
- Spouse: Xianfeng Emperor (m. 1852; died 1861)
- Issue: Tongzhi Emperor; Princess Rongshou (adopted)
Regnal name
- Empress Dowager Cixi (慈禧太后)
Posthumous name
- Empress Xiàoqīn Cíxǐ Duānyòu Kāngyí Zhāoyù Zhuāngchéng Shòugōng Qīnxiàn Chóngxī Pèitiān Xīngshèng Xiǎn (孝欽慈禧端佑康頤昭豫莊誠壽恭欽獻崇熙配天興聖顯皇后); Manchu: ᡥᡳᠶᠣᠣᡧᡠᠩᡤᠠ ᡤᡳᠩᡤᡠᠵᡳ ᡳᠯᡝᡨᡠ᠋ ᡥᡡᠸᠠᠩᡥᡝᠣ
- House: Yehe Nara (by birth); Aisin Gioro (by marriage)
- Father: Huizheng
- Mother: Lady Fuca
- Religion: Manchu shamanism, Tibetan Buddhism

Chinese name
- Chinese: 慈禧太后
Transcriptions
Standard Mandarin
- Hanyu Pinyin: Cíxǐ tàihòu
- Bopomofo: ㄘˊ ㄒㄧˇ ㄊㄞˋ ㄏㄡˋ
- Wade–Giles: Tz'ŭ^{2}-hsi^{3} t'ai^{4}-hou^{4}
- IPA: [tsʰɹ̩̌.ɕì tʰâɪ.xôʊ]
Yue: Cantonese
- Yale Romanization: Chìhhēi taaihauh
- Jyutping: Ci4-hei1 taai3-hau6
- IPA: [tsʰi˩.hej˥ tʰaj˧.hɐw˨]
Southern Min
- Hokkien POJ: Chû-hi thài-hiō

Manchu name
- Manchu script: ᠵᡳᠯᠠᠨ; ᡥᡡᡨᡠᡵᡳ; ᡥᡡᠸᠠᠩ; ᡨᠠᡳᡥᡝᠣ
- Möllendorff: jilan hūturi hūwang taiheo

Empress Dowager Cixi (Mandarin pronunciation: [tsʰɹ̩̌.ɕì]; 29 November 1835 – 15 November 1908) was a Manchu noblewoman of the Yehe Nara clan who, as empress dowager and regent, was the de facto ruler of the Qing Empire for much of the period from 1861 until her death in 1908.

Cixi was selected as a concubine of the Xianfeng Emperor in her adolescence and gave birth to his son, Zaichun, in 1856. After the Xianfeng Emperor's death in 1861, their son became the Tongzhi Emperor, and Cixi assumed the role of co-empress dowager alongside Xianfeng's widow, Empress Dowager Ci'an. She and Ci'an ousted a group of regents appointed by the late emperor and assumed the regency together. Cixi then consolidated control over the dynasty when she installed her nephew as the Guangxu Emperor at the death of the Tongzhi Emperor in 1875. Ci'an continued to be co-regent with Cixi until her death in 1881.

Cixi oversaw the Tongzhi Restoration, during which she rejected Western political institutions but supported technological and military modernization. In 1898, she suppressed the Hundred Days' Reform initiated by the Guangxu Emperor and placed him under house arrest for the remainder of his life, likely eventually having him murdered by arsenic poisoning. (Though it is also speculated that Yuan Shikai may have been the one to have him murdered, due to potential reprisals against him due to his role in supporting Empress Dowager Cixi's coup; there are no reliable sources to prove who murdered the Guangxu Emperor.)

During the Boxer Rebellion, Cixi initially supported the Boxers and declared war on the foreign powers: a decision that led to the occupation of Beijing by the Eight-Nation Alliance and her flight to Xi'an. After the humiliating Boxer Protocol pushed the Qing dynasty to the brink of collapse, she initiated reforms aimed at establishing a constitutional monarchy. Cixi died in November 1908, two days after the Guangxu Emperor, leaving power in the hands of conservative regents amid a deeply divided and unstable society.

Cixi's legacy remains contested. While widely portrayed as a ruthless reactionary, she has been reassessed by some revisionist historians who argue that she was scapegoated for structural problems beyond her control. These scholars credit her with pursuing pragmatic reform in contrast to the Guangxu Emperor's radicalism, maintaining political order under intense imperialist pressure, and supporting institutions such as the Beiyang Army and Peking University.

== Early life ==
=== Birth ===
Lady Yehe Nara was born on the tenth day of the tenth lunar month in the 15th year of the Daoguang Emperor's reign (which is 29 November 1835 in the Gregorian calendar). Her father was Huizheng (惠征), a member of the Bordered Blue Banner who held the title of a third class duke (三等公). Palace archives show that Huizheng was working in Beijing during the year of Xingzhen's birth, an indication that she was born in Beijing. The file records the location of her childhood home as Pichai Hutong, Xisipailou, Beijing (西四牌樓劈柴胡同). Lady Yehe Nara had a sister named Wanzhen and a brother named Guixiang.

=== Xianfeng era ===
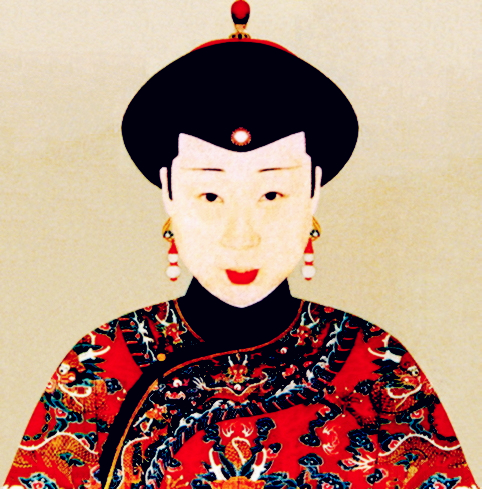
Consort Dowager Kangci, foster mother of the Xianfeng Emperor. She hosted the selection of Xianfeng's consorts in 1851, in which Lady Yehe Nara participated as a potential candidate.

In 1851, Lady Yehe Nara participated in the selection of wives for the Xianfeng Emperor alongside 60 other candidates, and the emperor's step-mother, Consort Dowager Kangci, chose her as one of the concubines. Among the other chosen candidates were Noble Lady Li of the Tatara clan (later Imperial Noble Consort Zhuangjing) and Concubine Zhen of the Niohuru clan (later Empress Dowager Ci'an). On 26 June 1852, Lady Yehe Nara left her widowed mother's residence at Xilahutong and entered the Forbidden City and was placed in the sixth rank of consorts, styled "Noble Lady Lan".

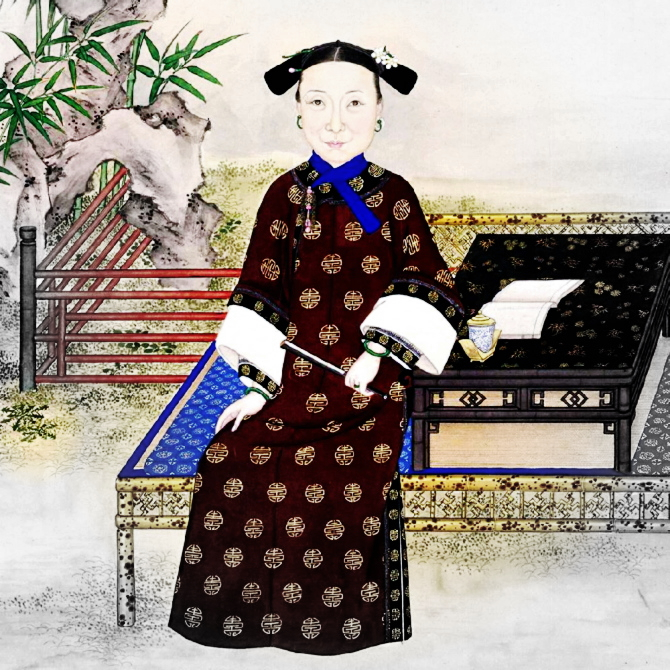
Portrait of a young Empress Dowager Cixi

The Pavilion of Beautiful Scenery, where Consort Yi gave birth to the Tongzhi Emperor

On 28 February 1854, Noble Lady Lan was elevated to the fifth rank of consorts and granted the title "Concubine Yi". In 1855, she became pregnant, and on 27 April 1856, she gave birth to Zaichun, Xianfeng's first and only surviving son. On the same day, she was elevated to the fourth rank of consorts as "Consort Yi". In 1857, when her son reached his first birthday, Consort Yi was elevated to the third rank of imperial consort as "Noble Consort Yi". This rank placed her second among the women in Xianfeng's harem after his empress, Lady Niohuru (formerly titled Concubine Zhen).

Unlike many of the other Manchu women in the imperial household, Noble Consort Yi was known for her ability to read and write Chinese. This skill granted her numerous opportunities to help the ailing emperor in the governing of the Chinese state on a daily basis. On various occasions, the Xianfeng Emperor had her read palace memorials for him and leave instructions on the memorials according to his will. As a result, she became well informed about state affairs and the art of governing.

==== End of the Xianfeng era ====
In September 1860, during the closing stages of the Second Opium War, the British diplomatic envoy Harry Parkes was arrested along with other hostages, who were tortured and executed. In retaliation, British and French troops under the command of Lord Elgin attacked Beijing, and by the following month, they had burned the Old Summer Palace to the ground. Xianfeng and his entourage, including Noble Consort Yi, fled Beijing to Rehe Province (around present-day Chengde, Hebei).

On hearing the news of the destruction of the Old Summer Palace, Xianfeng, who was already showing signs of dementia, fell into a depression. He turned heavily to alcohol and other drugs and became seriously ill. He summoned eight of his most prestigious ministers, headed by Sushun, Zaiyuan, and Duanhua, and named them the "Eight Regent Ministers" to direct and support the future emperor. Xianfeng died on 22 August 1861 at the Chengde Mountain Resort in Rehe Province.

Xianfeng's only heir was his five-year-old son with Noble Consort Yi. It is commonly assumed that on his deathbed, Xianfeng summoned Empress Niohuru and Noble Consort Yi and gave each of them a stamp. He hoped that when his son ascended the throne, the two women would cooperate in harmony and help the young emperor to grow and mature together. This may also have been done as a check on the power of the eight regents. There is no evidence for this incident, however, and it is unlikely that the emperor ever would have intended Noble Consort Yi to wield political power.

It is possible that the seal, allegedly given as a symbol for the child, was really just a present for Noble Consort Yi herself. Informal seals numbered in the thousands and were not considered political accoutrements: rather as objects of art commissioned for pleasure by emperors to stamp on items such as paintings, or given as presents to the concubines. Upon the death of the Xianfeng Emperor, Empress Niohuru was elevated as Empress Dowager Ci'an, but she was popularly known as the "East Empress Dowager" because she lived in the eastern Zhongcui Palace. Noble Consort Yi was also elevated to Empress Dowager Cixi. She was popularly known as the "West Empress Dowager" (西太后) because she lived inside the western Chuxiu Palace.

== Tongzhi era ==
=== Xinyou Coup: Ousting Sushun ===
Empress Dowager Ci'an, with whom Cixi staged the Xinyou Coup. They were co-regents until Ci'an's death in 1881.

By the time of Xianfeng's death, Empress Dowager Cixi had become a political strategist. In Rehe Province, while waiting for an astrologically favourable time to transport the emperor's coffin back to Beijing, Cixi conspired with court officials and imperial relatives to seize power.

Cixi's position as the lower-ranked empress dowager had no intrinsic political power attached to it. In addition, her son, the young emperor, was not a political force himself. As a result, it became necessary for her to ally herself with other powerful figures, including Empress Dowager Ci'an. Cixi suggested that they become co-reigning empresses dowager, with powers exceeding the eight regents; the two had long been close friends since Cixi first came to the imperial household.

Tensions grew between the two empresses dowager and the eight regents, who were led by Sushun. The regents did not like Cixi's interference in political affairs, and their frequent confrontations with the empresses dowager left Ci'an frustrated. Ci'an often refused to come to court audiences, leaving Cixi to deal with the ministers alone.

Secretly, Cixi had begun gathering the support of talented ministers, soldiers, and others who were ostracized by the eight regents for personal or political reasons. Among them were two of Xianfeng's brothers: Prince Gong and Prince Chun. Prince Gong had been excluded from power, yet harboured great ambitions. While Cixi aligned herself with the two princes, a memorial came from Shandong asking for her to "rule from behind the curtains" or "listen to politics behind the curtains" (垂簾聽政), i.e., to assume power as de facto ruler. The same memorial also asked Prince Gong to enter the political arena as a principal "aide to the Emperor".

When Xianfeng's funeral procession left for Beijing, Cixi took advantage of her alliances with Princes Gong and Chun. She and her son returned to the capital before the rest of the party, along with Zaiyuan and Duanhua, two of the eight regents, while Sushun was left to accompany the deceased emperor's procession. Cixi's early return to Beijing meant that she had more time to plan with Prince Gong and ensure that the power base of the eight regents was divided between Sushun and his allies, Zaiyuan and Duanhua. In order to remove them from power, history was rewritten: the regents were dismissed for having carried out incompetent negotiations with the "barbarians" that had caused Xianfeng to flee to Rehe Province "greatly against his will", among other charges.

To display her high moral standards, Cixi executed only three of the eight regents. Prince Gong had suggested that Sushun and others be executed by the most painful method, known as slow slicing ("death by a thousand cuts"), but Cixi declined the suggestion and ordered that Sushun be beheaded, while the other two also marked for execution, Zaiyuan and Duanhua, were given pieces of white silk for them to hang themselves with.

In addition, Cixi refused outright the idea of executing the family members of the regents, as would be done in accordance with imperial tradition of an alleged usurper. Ironically, Qing imperial tradition also dictated that women and princes were never to engage in politics. In breaking with tradition, Cixi became the only empress dowager in the Qing dynasty to assume the role of regent, ruling from behind the curtains.

This coup is historically known as the Xinyou Coup because it took place in the xinyou year, the name of the year 1861 in the Chinese sexagenary cycle.

=== Ruling behind the curtain ===
==== New era ====
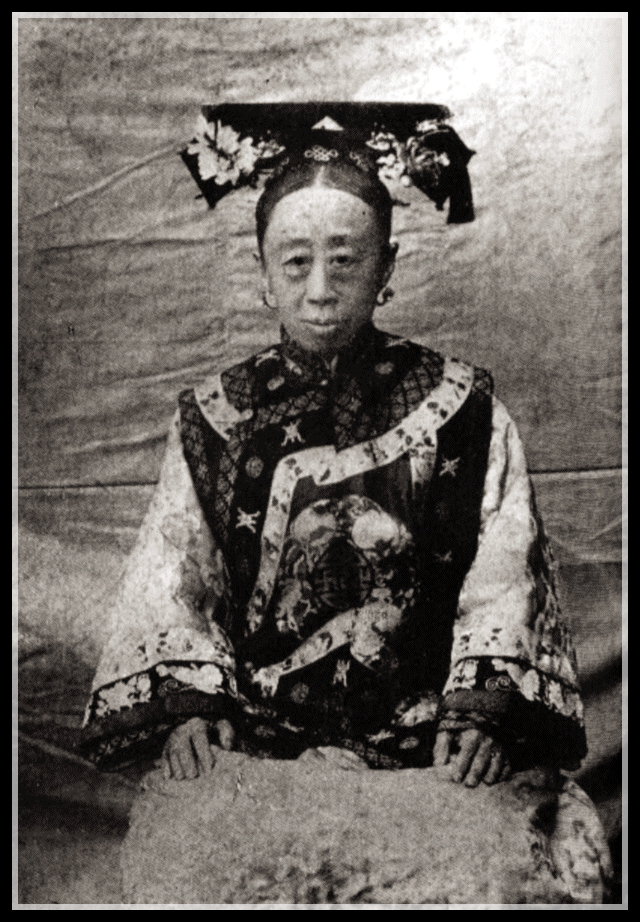
Princess Rongshou, Prince Gong's daughter.

In November 1861, a few days after the Xinyou Coup, Cixi was quick to reward Prince Gong for his help. He was appointed prince regent and his eldest daughter, Princess Rongshou, was made a first rank princess, a title usually bestowed only on the empress' first-born daughter. However, Cixi avoided giving Prince Gong the absolute political power that princes such as Dorgon exercised during the Shunzhi Emperor's reign.

As one of her first acts of "ruling behind the curtain" from within the Hall of Mental Cultivation, the political and governmental hub during this era, Cixi, nominally along with Ci'an, issued two imperial edicts on behalf of the boy emperor. The first stated that the two empresses dowager were to be the sole decision-makers "without interference", and the second changed the emperor's regnal title from Qixiang (祺祥; "auspicious") to Tongzhi (同治; "collective stability").

Despite being designated as the sole decision-makers, both Ci'an and Cixi were forced to rely on the Grand Council and a complex series of procedures in order to deal with affairs of state. When state documents came in, they were to be first forwarded to the empresses dowager, then referred back to Prince Gong and the Grand Council. Having discussed the matters, Prince Gong and his colleagues would seek the instruction of the empresses dowager at audiences, and imperial orders would be drawn up accordingly, with drafts having to be approved by the empresses dowager before edicts were issued. The most important role of the empresses dowager during the regency was to apply their seals to edicts, a merely mechanical role in a complex bureaucracy.

==== Cleaning up the bureaucracy ====
Cixi's ascendancy came at a time of internal chaos and foreign challenges. The effects of the Second Opium War were still hovering over the country, and the Taiping Rebellion continued its seemingly unstoppable advance through China's south, eroding the Qing Empire bit by bit. Internally, both the national bureaucracy and regional authorities were infested with corruption.

1861 happened to be the year of official examinations, whereby officials of all levels presented their political reports from the previous three years. Cixi decided that the time was ripe for a bureaucratic overhaul, and she met with all officials above the level of provincial governor, who had to report to her personally. Cixi thus took on part of the role usually given to the Bureaucratic Affairs Department (吏部).

Cixi had two prominent officials executed to serve as examples for others: Qingying, a military shilang who had tried to bribe his way out of demotion, and He Guiqing, then Viceroy of Liangjiang, who fled Changzhou in the wake of an incoming Taiping army instead of trying to defend the city. A number of reforms were implemented, such as the development of the Zongli Yamen, an official foreign ministry to deal with international affairs, the restoration of regional armies and regional strongmen, modernization of railroads, factories, and arsenals, an increase of industrial and commercial productivity, and the institution of a period of peace that allowed China time to modernize and develop.

Another significant challenge Cixi faced was the increasingly decrepit state of the Manchu elites. Since the beginning of Qing rule over China in 1644, most major positions at court had been held by Manchus. Cixi, again in a reversal of imperial tradition, entrusted the country's most powerful military unit against the Taiping rebels into the hands of a Han Chinese, Zeng Guofan. Additionally, in the next three years, Cixi appointed Han Chinese officials as governors in all southern Chinese provinces, raising alarm bells in the court, traditionally protective of Manchu dominance.

Regarding the reforms of the Tongzhi Restoration, Mary C. Wright suggested that "not only a dynasty but also a civilization which appeared to have collapsed was revived to last for another sixty years by the extraordinary efforts of extraordinary men in the 1860s." John K. Fairbank, a sinologist, wrote, "[t]hat the Qing managed to survive both domestic and international attacks is due largely to the policy and leadership changes known as the Qing Restoration."

==== Taiping victory and Prince Gong ====
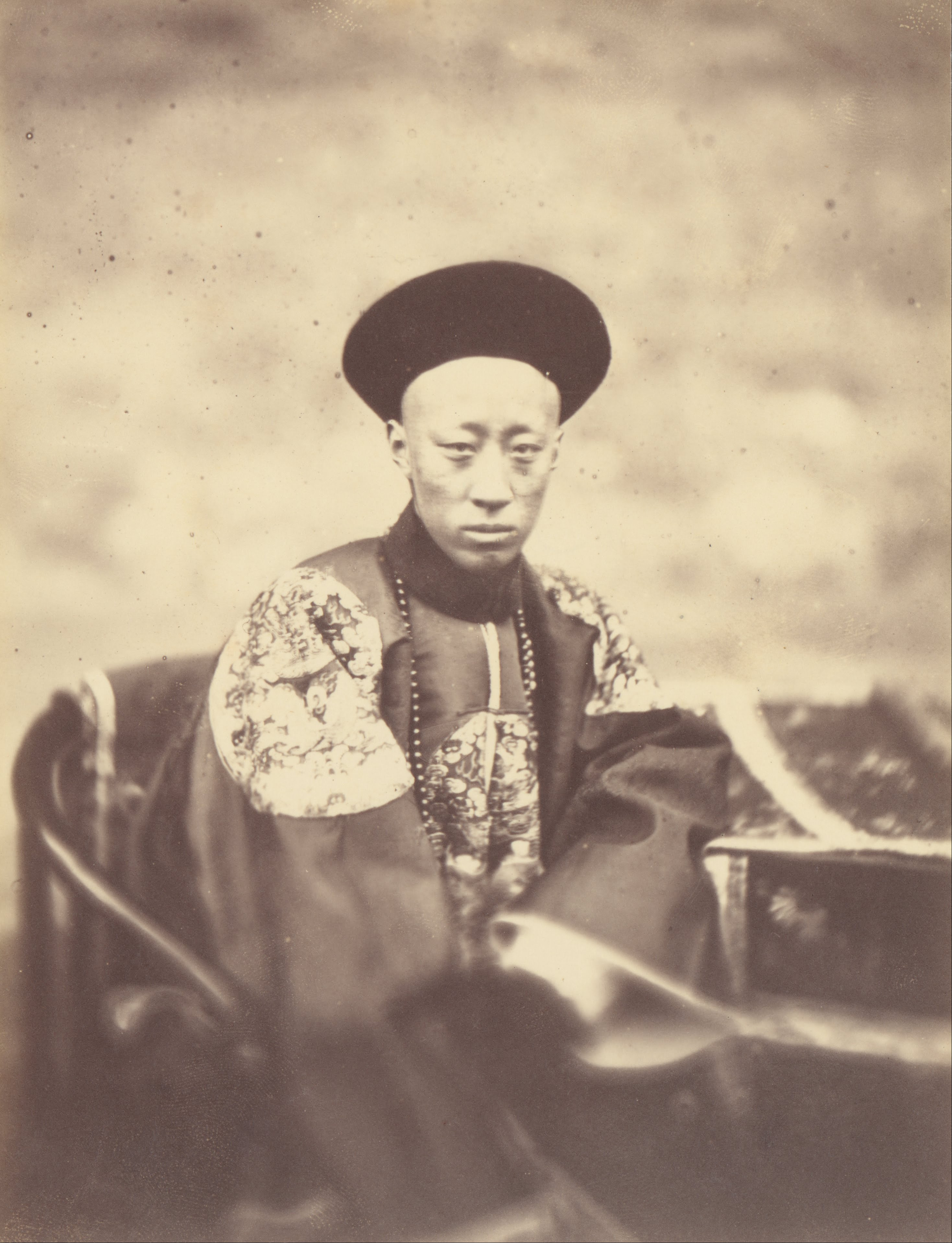
Prince Gong, Cixi's crucial ally during the Xinyou Coup. He was rewarded by Cixi for his help during her most difficult times, but was eventually eliminated from office by Cixi for his ambition.

In July 1864, the Xiang Army, under the command of Zeng Guofan, defeated the Taiping rebel army in a hard-fought battle at Tianjing (present-day Nanjing). Zeng was rewarded with the title of "Marquess Yiyong, First Class", while his brother Zeng Guoquan, along with Li Hongzhang, Zuo Zongtang, and other Han Chinese officers who fought against the Taiping rebels, were rewarded with auspicious decorations and titles.

With the Taiping rebel threat receding, Cixi focused her attention on new internal threats to her power. Of special concern was the position of Prince Gong, who was prince-regent in the imperial court. Prince Gong gathered under his command the support of all outstanding Han Chinese armies. In addition, Prince Gong controlled daily court affairs as the head of the Grand Council and the Zongli Yamen (the de facto foreign affairs ministry). With his increasing stature, Prince Gong was considered a threat to Cixi and her power.

Although Prince Gong was rewarded for his conduct and recommendation of Zeng Guofan before the Taiping rebels' defeat, Cixi was quick to move after Cai Shouqi, a minor scribe-official, filed a memorial accusing Prince Gong of corruption and showing disrespect to the emperor. Having built up a powerful base and a network of allies at court, Prince Gong considered the accusations insignificant. Cixi, however, took the memorial as a stepping stone to Prince Gong's removal.

In April 1865, under the pretext that Prince Gong had "improper court conduct before the two empresses", among a series of other charges, the prince was dismissed from all his offices and appointments, but was allowed to retain his status as a noble. The dismissal surprised the nobility and court officials, and brought about numerous petitions for his return. Prince Gong's brothers, Prince Dun and Prince Chun, both sought their brother's reinstatement. Prince Gong himself, in an audience with Cixi and Ci'an, burst into tears.

Bowing to popular pressure, Cixi allowed Prince Gong to return to his position as the head of the Zongli Yamen, but rid him of his title of prince regent. Prince Gong would never return to political prominence again, and neither would the liberal and pro-reform policies of his time. Prince Gong's demotion revealed Cixi's iron grip on politics, and her lack of willingness to give up absolute power to anyone—not even Prince Gong, her most important ally in the Xinyou Coup.

==== Foreign influence ====
China's defeat in the Second Opium War of 1856–60 revealed that its military strategies were outdated, both on land and sea, and in terms of weaponry. Sensing an immediate threat from foreigners and realising that China's agricultural-based economy could not hope to compete with the industrial prowess of the West, Cixi decided that, for the first time in Chinese history, China would learn from the Western powers and import their knowledge and technology.

At the time, three prominent Han Chinese officials, Zeng Guofan, Li Hongzhang, and Zuo Zongtang, had all begun industrial programs in the country's southern regions. In supporting these programmes, Cixi also decreed the opening of the Tongwen Guan in 1862, a school for foreign languages in Beijing. The Tongwen Guan specialised in new-age topics such as astronomy and mathematics, as well as the English, French and Russian languages. The Chinese Educational Mission sent young boys abroad to the United States for studies.

China's "learn from foreigners" programme quickly met with impediments. The Chinese military institutions were in desperate need of reform. Cixi's solution, under the advice of officials at court, was to purchase seven British warships. When the warships arrived in China, however, they were staffed with British sailors, all under British command. The Chinese were enraged at this "international joke", negotiations broke down between the two parties, and China returned the warships to Britain, where they were to be auctioned off.

Scholars sometimes attribute the failure of China's foreign programmes to Cixi's conservative attitude and old methods of thinking, and contend that Cixi would learn only so much from the foreigners, provided it did not infringe upon her own power. Under the pretext that a railway was too loud and would "disturb the emperors' tombs", Cixi forbade its construction. When construction went ahead anyway in 1877 on Li Hongzhang's recommendation, Cixi asked that they be pulled by horse-drawn carts. She also refused to be driven in a motorcar, as the driver would be unable to lower himself in front of her, as custom dictated. Cixi was especially alarmed at the liberal thinking of people who had studied abroad, and saw that it posed a new threat to her power. In 1881, she put a halt to the policy of sending children abroad to study and withdrew her formerly open attitude towards foreigners.

==== Tongzhi Emperor's marriage ====
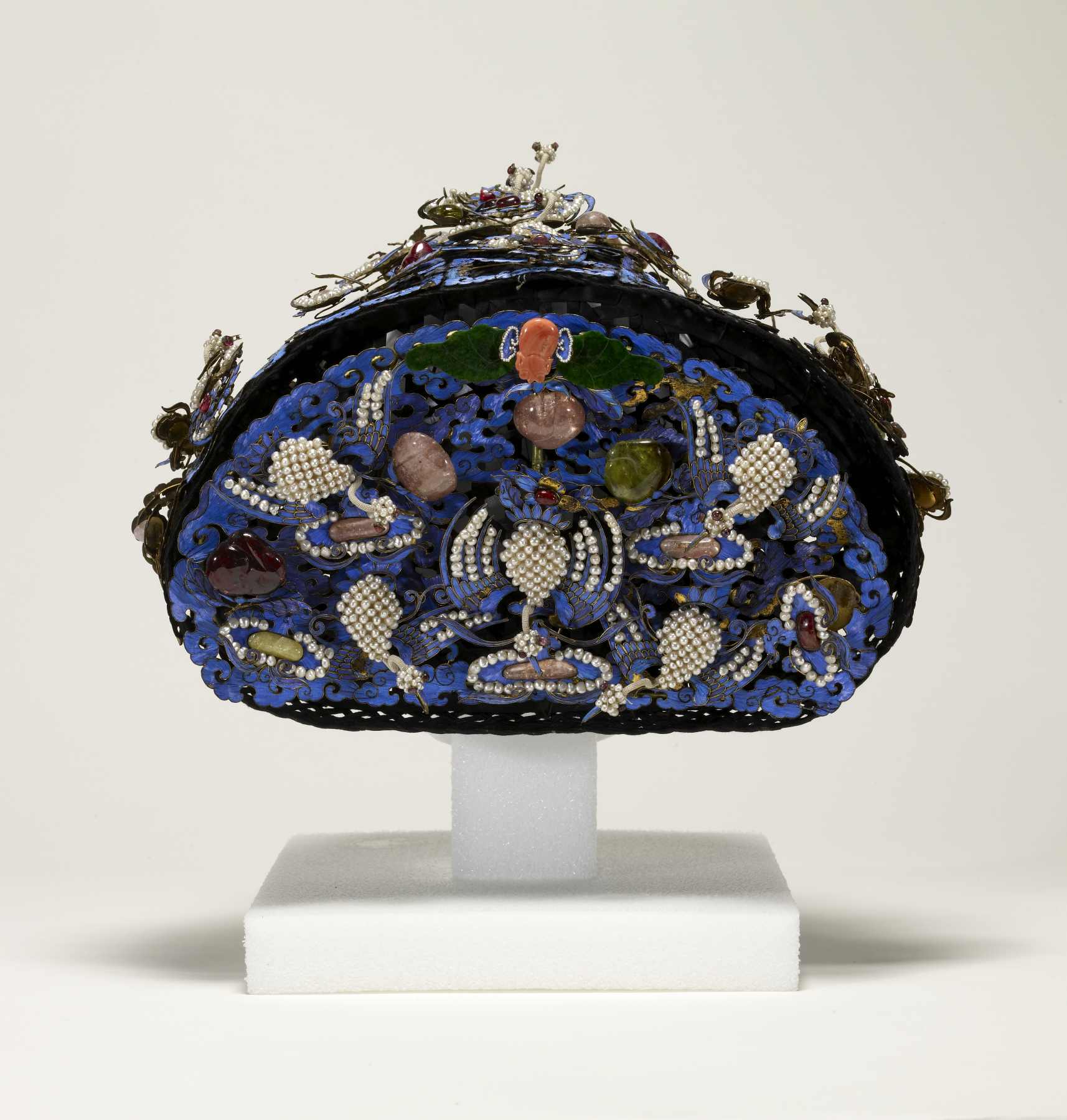
Ceremonial headdress likely worn by Cixi. The small phoenixes emerging from the surface represent the empress. The Walters Art Museum

In 1872, the Tongzhi Emperor turned 17. Under the guidance of Empress Dowager Ci'an, he was married to Lady Arute. The new empress's grandfather, Duanhua, Prince Zheng, was one of the eight regents ousted from power in the Xinyou Coup of 1861. He had been Cixi's rival during the coup and was ordered to commit suicide after Cixi's victory. As a consequence, there were tensions between Cixi and Arute, and this was often a source of irritation for Cixi. Moreover, Arute's zodiac symbol of tiger was perceived as life-threatening by the superstitious Cixi, whose own zodiac symbol was a goat. According to Cixi's belief, it was a warning from the gods that she would eventually fall prey to Arute.

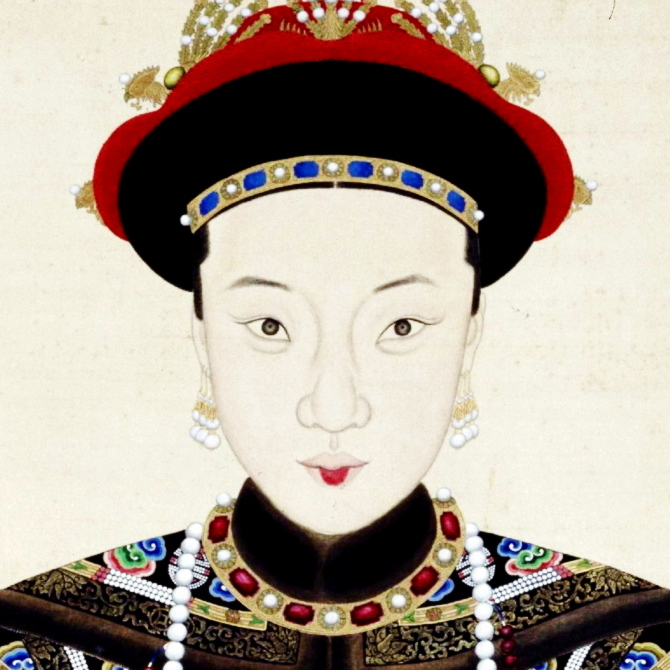
Empress Xiaozheyi, the Tongzhi Emperor's wife, who had the approval of Empress Dowager Ci'an but never Cixi's. It is widely speculated that Empress Xiaozheyi was pregnant with Tongzhi's child and that Cixi orchestrated the empress's demise.

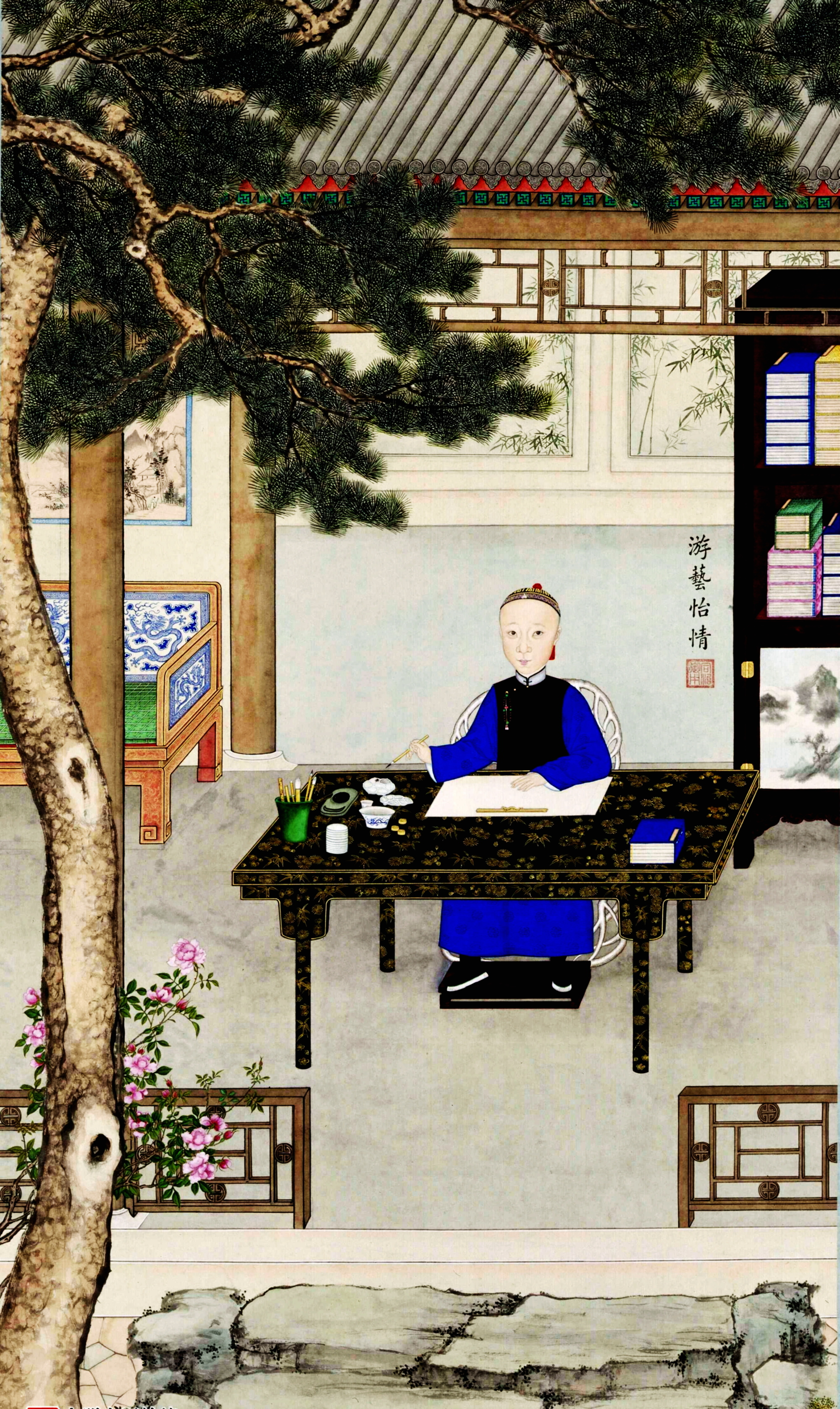
Tongzhi doing his coursework. Cixi's high expectations of him may have contributed to his strong distaste for learning.

Empress Arute was well received by both Tongzhi and Ci'an. Her personal consultants once warned her to be more agreeable and docile to Cixi, who was truly the one in power. Arute replied, "I am a principal consort, having been carried through the front gate with pomp and circumstance, as mandated by our ancestors. Empress Dowager Cixi was a concubine, and entered our household through a side gate."

From the start of his marriage, Tongzhi began to spend most of his time with his empress at the expense of his four concubines, including Imperial Noble Consort Shushen, who was Cixi's preferred candidate for empress consort. As hostility grew between Arute and Cixi, Cixi suggested the emperor and empress spend more time on studies and spied on Tongzhi using palace eunuchs. After her warning was ignored, Cixi ordered the couple to separate, and Tongzhi purportedly spent several months following Cixi's order in isolation at Qianqing Palace.

The young emperor, who could no longer cope with his grief and loneliness, grew more and more ill-tempered. He began to treat his servants with cruelty and punished them physically for minor offences. Under the joined influence of court eunuchs and his cousin and best friend Zaicheng (Prince Gong's son), the emperor managed to escape the palace in search of pleasure in the unrestricted parts of Beijing. For several evenings, Tongzhi disguised himself as a commoner and secretly spent the nights in the brothels of Beijing. His sexual habits became common talk among court officials and commoners, and there are many records of the emperor's escapades.

The Tongzhi Emperor received a rigorous education from four famous teachers of Cixi's own choosing: Li Hongzao, Qi Junzao, Weng Xincun, and Woren. This group was later joined by Weng Xincun's son, Weng Tonghe; the emperor's governor, also selected by Cixi, was Mianyu. The imperial teachers instructed the emperor in the classics and various old texts, for which Tongzhi displayed little or no interest. Despite, or perhaps because of, the pressure and stress put upon the young emperor, he despised learning for the majority of his life. According to Weng Tonghe's diary, Tongzhi could not read a memorandum in full sentences by the age of 16. Worried about her son's inability to learn, Cixi only pressured him more.

When Tongzhi was given personal rule in November 1873 at the age of 18 (four years behind the usual custom), he proved to be an incompetent ruler. Tongzhi made two important policy decisions during his short stint of rule, which lasted from 1873 to 1875. One decree was that the Summer Palace, destroyed by the English and French in the Second Opium War, would be completely rebuilt, under the pretext that it was a gift to Cixi and Ci'an. Historians also suggest that it was an attempt to drive Cixi from the Forbidden City, so he could rule without interference in policy or his private affairs.

The imperial treasury was almost depleted at the time from internal strife and foreign wars, and as a result, Tongzhi asked the Board of Finance to forage for the necessary funds. In addition, he encouraged members of the nobility and high officials to donate funds from their personal resources. Once construction began, the emperor checked its progress on a monthly basis and would often spend days away from court, indulging himself in pleasures outside of the Forbidden City. Uneasy about Tongzhi's neglect of national affairs, the emperor's uncles Prince Gong and Prince Chun, along with other senior court officials, submitted a joint memorandum asking the emperor to cease the construction of the Summer Palace, among other recommendations.

Tongzhi, unwilling to submit to criticism, issued an imperial edict in August 1874 to strip Prince Gong of his princely title and demote him to the status of a commoner. Two days later, Prince Dun, Prince Chun, Prince Fu, Jingshou, Prince Qing, Wenxiang, Baojun, and Grand Councillors Shen Guifen and Li Hongzao were all to be stripped of their respective titles and jobs. Seeing the mayhem unfold from behind the scenes, Cixi and Ci'an made an unprecedented appearance at court directly criticising Tongzhi for his wrongful actions and asked him to withdraw the edict; Cixi said that "without Prince Gong, the situation today would not exist for you and me."

Feeling a grand sense of loss at court and unable to assert his authority, Tongzhi returned to his former habits. It was rumoured that he caught syphilis and became visibly ill. The physicians spread a rumour that Tongzhi had smallpox, and proceeded to give medical treatment accordingly. Within a few weeks, on 13 January 1875, Tongzhi died; his wife, Empress Xiaozheyi, died soon after in March. Judging from a modern medical perspective, the onset of syphilis comes in stages, thus the emperor's quick death does not seem to reflect its symptoms; therefore, most historians maintain that Tongzhi did, in fact, die from smallpox. Thus, by 1875, Cixi was back onto the helm of imperial power.

== Guangxu era ==
=== New challenges and illness ===
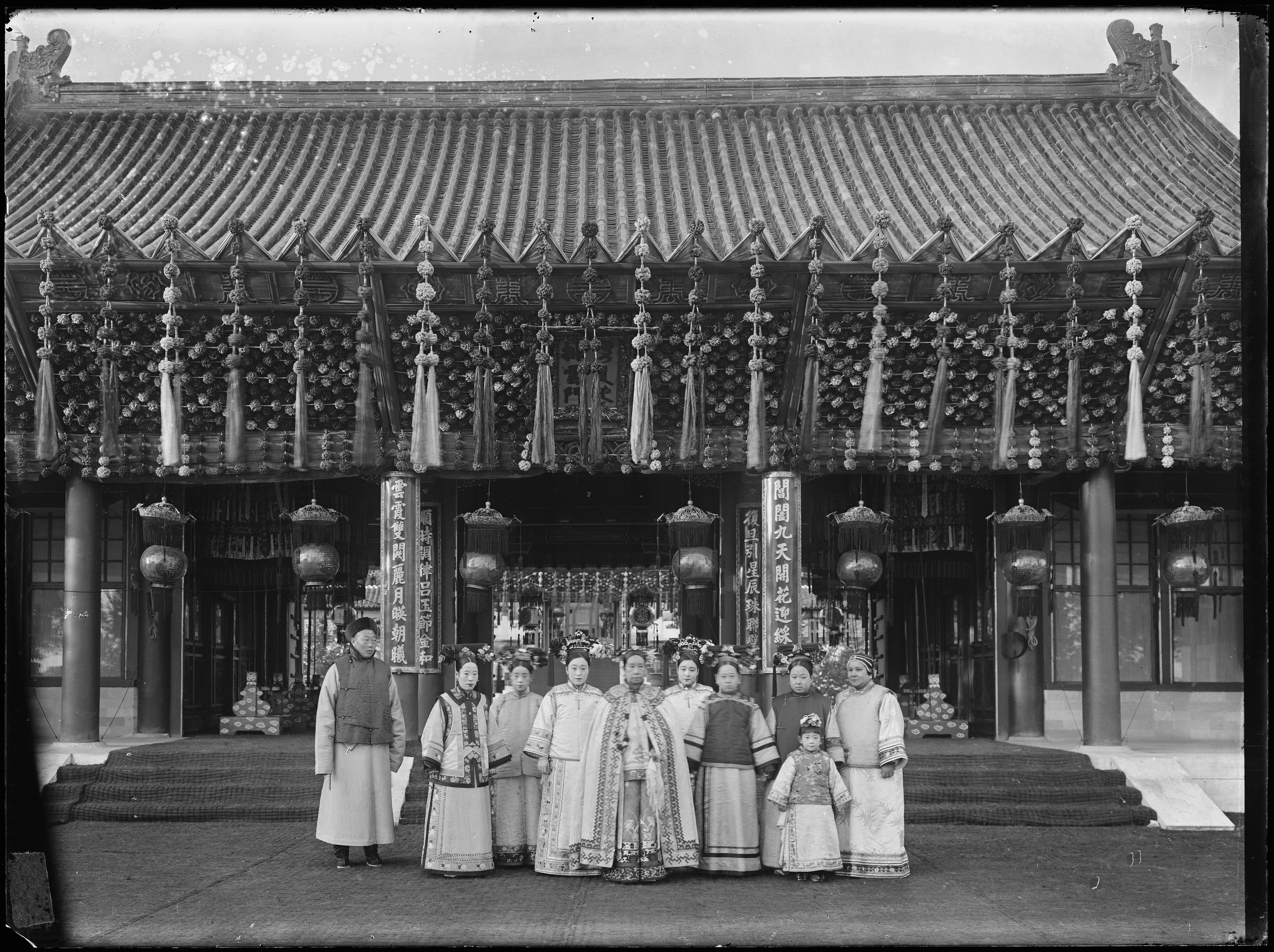
Empress Dowager Cixi (front middle) poses with her court attendants and the Guangxu Emperor's empress (second from left), who was also her niece.

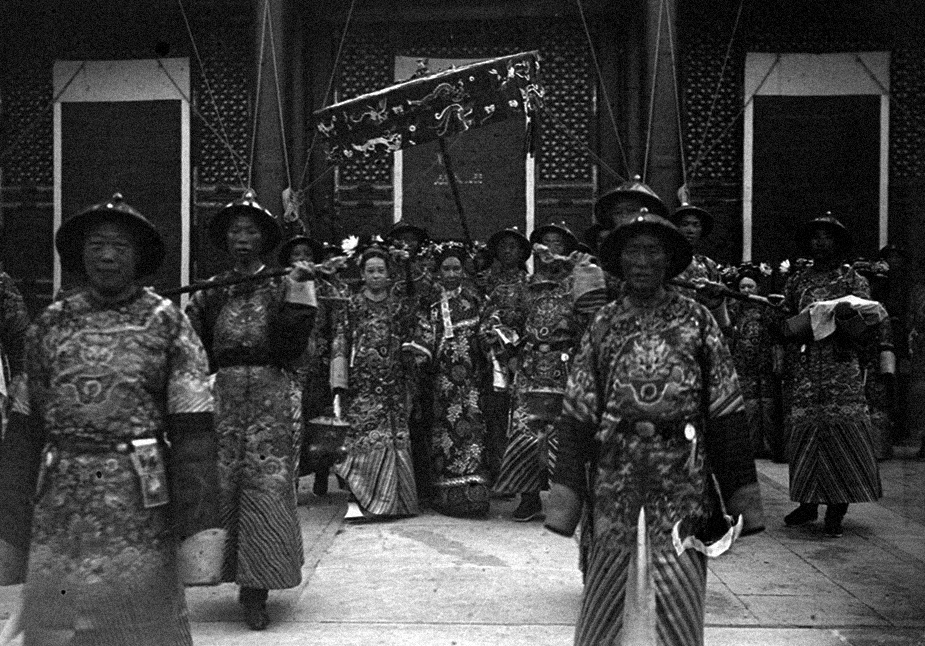
Empress Dowager Cixi holds hands with the fourth daughter of Prince Qing (to her left) and chief palace eunuch Li Lianying (to her right). The lady standing in the background is Consort Jin (later Dowager Imperial Noble Consort Duankang).

Tongzhi died without a male heir, a circumstance that created an unprecedented succession crisis in the dynastic line. Members of the generation above were considered unfit, as they could not, by definition, be the successor of their nephew; therefore, the new emperor had to be from the same generation as Tongzhi or a generation below.

After considerable disagreement between the two empresses dowager, Zaitian, the four-year-old firstborn son of Prince Chun and Cixi's sister, Wanzhen, was to become the new emperor. 1875 was declared the first year of the Guangxu era (Guangxu means "glorious succession"). Zaitian was taken from his home and for the remainder of his life would be completely cut off from his family. While addressing Ci'an conventionally as huang e'niang ("Empress Mother"), the Guangxu Emperor was forced to address Cixi as qin baba ("Dear Father"), in order to enforce an image that she was the fatherly figure in the household. Guangxu began his education when he was aged five, taught by the imperial tutor Weng Tonghe, with whom he would develop a lasting bond.

Shortly after Guangxu's accession, Cixi fell severely ill. This rendered her largely inaccessible to her young nephew and had the result of leaving Ci'an to attend to most of the affairs of state.

The sudden death of Ci'an in April 1881 brought a new challenge. Ci'an had taken little interest in running state affairs, but was the decision-maker in most family affairs. As the empress of the Xianfeng Emperor, she took seniority over Cixi, despite being two years her junior. Decades later, rumours would circulate that Cixi had poisoned Ci'an, perhaps as a result of a possible conflict between Cixi and Ci'an over the execution of the eunuch An Dehai in 1869, or a possible will from the late Xianfeng Emperor that was issued exclusively to Ci'an; however, due to a lack of evidence to substantiate the rumour, historians are reluctant to believe that Cixi poisoned Ci'an. Instead, it is generally believed that Ci'an's cause of death was a sudden stroke, as validated by traditional Chinese medicine.

In the years between 1881 and 1883, Cixi resorted to written communication only with her ministers. The young emperor reportedly was forced to conduct some audiences alone, without Cixi to assist him.

The once fierce and determined Prince Gong, frustrated by Cixi's iron grip on power, did little to question Cixi on state affairs, and supported Manchu involvement in the Sino-French War of 1884–1885. Cixi used China's loss in the war as a pretext for getting rid of Prince Gong and other important decision-makers in the Grand Council in 1885. She downgraded Prince Gong to "advisor" and elevated the more easily influenced Prince Chun, Guangxu's father.

When it was first developed by Empress Dowager Cixi, the Beiyang Fleet was said to be the strongest navy in East Asia. Before her nephew Guangxu took over the throne in 1889, Cixi wrote out explicit orders that the navy should continue to develop and expand gradually. However, after Cixi went into retirement, all naval and military development came to a drastic halt. Japan's victories over China has often been falsely rumored to be the fault of Cixi; many believed that Cixi was the cause of the navy's defeat by embezzling funds from the navy in order to build the Summer Palace in Beijing. The greatest symbol of this enduring belief is the Marble Boat that is part of the Summer Palace.

However, extensive research by Chinese historians suggests that Cixi was not the cause of the Chinese navy's decline. In actuality, China's defeat was caused by Guangxu's lack of interest in developing and maintaining the military. His close adviser, Grand Tutor Weng Tonghe, advised Guangxu to cut all funding to the navy and army, because he did not see Japan as a true threat: there were also several natural disasters during the early 1890s, which the emperor thought to be more pressing to expend funds on.

=== Guangxu Emperor's accession ===
Guangxu technically gained the right to rule at the age of 16 in 1887 after Cixi issued an edict to arrange a ceremony to mark his accession. Because of her prestige and power, however, court officials voiced their opposition to Guangxu's personal rule, citing the emperor's youth as the main reason. Prince Chun and Weng Tonghe, each with a different motive, requested that Guangxu's accession be postponed until a later date. Cixi, with her reputed reluctance, accepted the "advice" and legitimised her continued rule through a new legal document that allowed her to "aid" Guangxu in his rule indefinitely.

Guangxu slowly began to take on more responsibilities in spite of Cixi's prolonged regency. In 1886, he attended his first field plowing ceremony and began commenting on imperial state documents. By 1887, he began to rule under Cixi's supervision.

Guangxu married and took up the reins of power in 1889. By that year, the emperor was already 18, older than the conventional marriage age for emperors. Prior to his wedding, a large fire engulfed the Gate of Supreme Harmony at the Forbidden City. This event followed a trend of recent natural disasters that were considered alarming by many observers. According to traditional Chinese political theory, such incidents were taken as a warning of the imminent loss of the "Mandate of Heaven" by current rulers.

For Guangxu's empress, Cixi chose her niece, and Guangxu's cousin, Jingfen. Cixi also selected two concubines for the emperor, who were sisters, Consorts Jin and Zhen. Guangxu eventually would prefer to spend more time with Consort Zhen, neglecting his empress, to Cixi's displeasure. In 1894, Cixi degraded Consort Zhen, citing intervention in political affairs as the main reason. According to some reports, she even had her flogged. Consort Jin had also been implicated in Consort Zhen's reported influence peddling, and also apparently suffered a similar punishment. A cousin of the consorts, Zhirui, was banished from the capital to a military outpost.

=== "Retirement" ===
On 5 March 1889, Cixi retired from her second regency, but nonetheless continued to serve as the effective head of the imperial family. Many officials felt and showed more loyalty to the empress dowager than they did to the emperor: owing in part to her seniority, and in part to her personalised approach to cultivating court favourites, many of whom would be given gifts of her artwork and invitations to join her at the theater for opera and acrobatics.

In spite of her residence for a period of time at the Summer Palace, which had been constructed with the official intention of providing her a suitable place to live after retiring from political affairs, Cixi continued to influence the decisions and actions of the Guangxu Emperor, even after he began his formal rule at age 19. Along with an entourage of court officials, Guangxu would pay visits to her every second or third day at which major political decisions would be made. Weng Tonghe observed that while the emperor dealt with day-to-day administration, the Grand Councillors gave their advice in more complex cases, and in the most complex cases of all, the advice of Cixi was sought.

In 1894, the First Sino-Japanese War broke out over Korea, whose age-old allegiance to Beijing was wavering. After the decisive victory and ensuing Treaty of Shimonoseki, Japan annexed Taiwan from Qing China. During this period, Cixi was continuously called upon to arbitrate policy-making, and the emperor was sometimes even bypassed in decision-making processes. Cixi was eventually given copies of the secret palace memorials as well, a practice that carried on until 1898, when it became unnecessary.

In November 1894, Cixi celebrated her 60th birthday. Borrowing from the plans used for the celebrations of the 70th and 80th birthdays of Empress Xiaoshengxian (the Qianlong Emperor's mother), plans included a triumphal progress along the decorated road between the Forbidden City and the Summer Palace, decorations for the Beijing city gates and monumental archways, free theatrical performances, remission of punishments, and the restoration of degraded officials. However, the war between China and Japan forced the empress dowager to cancel the lavish celebrations she had planned and settle for a much smaller commemoration that was held in the Forbidden City.

=== Hundred Days' Reform ===
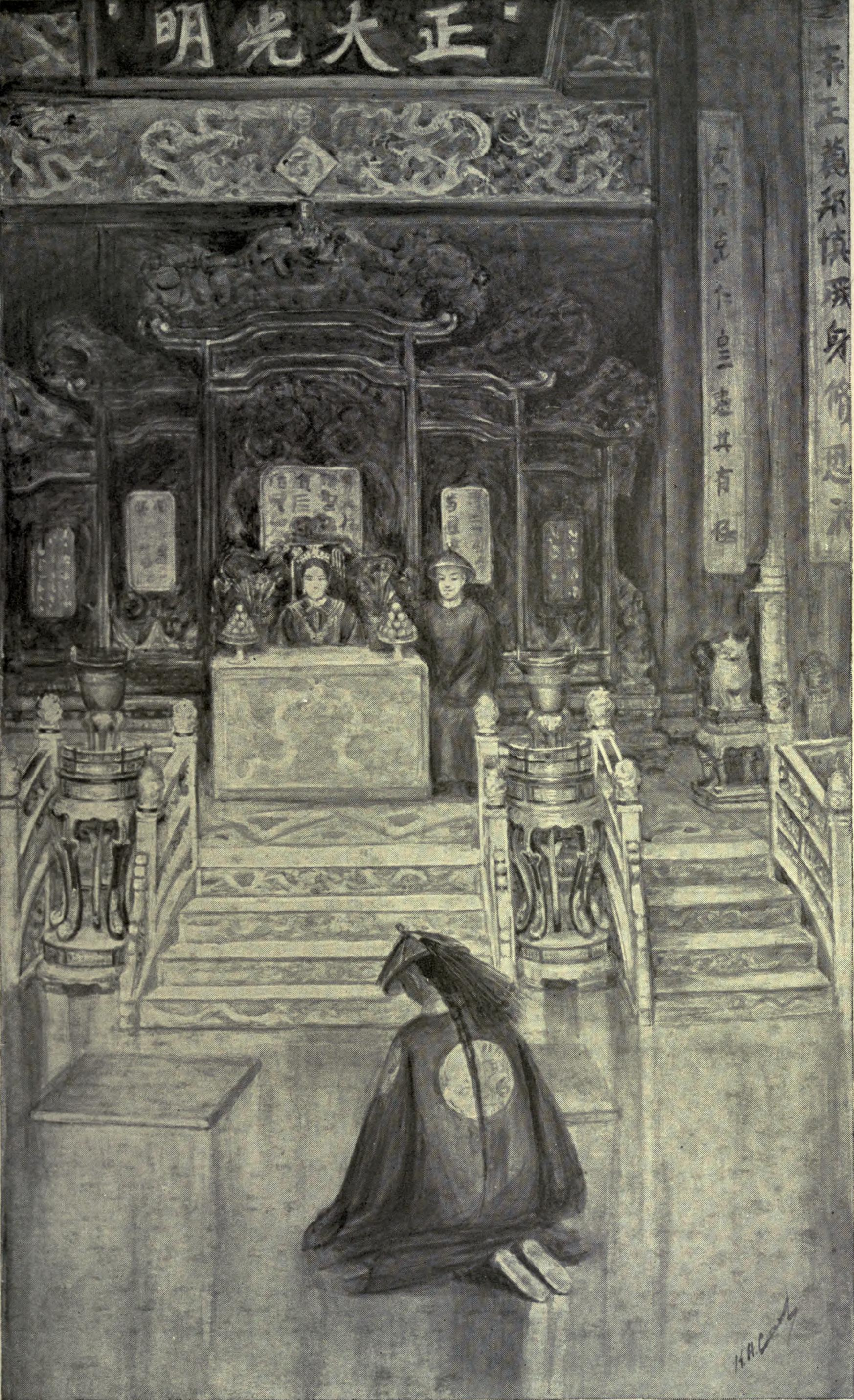
Cixi and Guangxu holding court, drawing by Katharine Carl

After ascending to the throne, Guangxu became more reform-minded. After a humiliating defeat in the First Sino-Japanese War of 1894—during which the Chinese Beiyang Fleet was virtually destroyed by the Imperial Japanese Navy—the Qing government faced unprecedented challenges internally and abroad, with its very existence at stake. Under the influence of reformist-officials Kang Youwei and Liang Qichao, Guangxu believed that by learning from constitutional monarchies such as Japan and Germany, China would become politically and economically powerful.

In June 1898, Guangxu launched the Hundred Days' Reform aimed at sweeping political, legal, and social changes, and issued edicts for far-reaching modernising reforms. These abrupt reforms, however, came without building support either at court or in the bureaucracy. Cixi, whether concerned that they would check her power or fearful that they would lead to disorder, stepped in to prevent them from going further. Some government and military officials warned Cixi that the ming-shi (reformation bureau) had been geared toward conspiracy.

Allegations of treason against the emperor, as well as suspected Japanese influence within the reform movement, led Cixi to resume the role of regent and resume control at the court. On 21 September 1898, the Manchu general Ronglu, took the emperor to Ocean Terrace, a small palace on an island in the middle of Zhongnanhai linked to the rest of the Forbidden City only by a controlled causeway. Cixi followed this action with an edict that proclaimed Guangxu's total disgrace and unfitness to be emperor. Guangxu's reign effectively came to an end.

According to research by Professor Lei Chia-sheng (雷家聖), on 11 September 1898, during the Hundred Days' Reform, former Japanese prime minister Itō Hirobumi arrived in China. Almost at the same time, British missionary Timothy Richard was invited to Beijing by the reformist Kang Youwei. Richard suggested that China should hand over some political power to Itō in order to help push the reforms further. On 18 September, Richard convinced Kang to adopt a plan by which China would join a federation composed of China, Japan, the United States, and England. This suggestion did not reflect the policies of the countries concerned. It was Richard's (and perhaps Itō's) trick to convince China to hand over national rights. Kang nonetheless asked fellow reformers Yang Shenxiu (楊深秀) and Song Bolu (宋伯魯) to report this plan to Guangxu. On 20 September, Yang sent a memorial to this effect to the emperor. In another memorial written the next day, Song Bolu also advocated the formation of a federation and the sharing of the diplomatic, fiscal, and military powers of the four countries under a hundred-man committee.

Still according to Lei's findings, on 13 October, British ambassador Claude MacDonald reported to his government about the Chinese situation, saying that Chinese reforms had been damaged by Kang Youwei and his friends' actions. British diplomat Frederick Bourne claimed in his own report that Kang was a dreamer who had been seduced by Timothy Richard's sweet words. Bourne thought Richard was a plotter. The British and U.S. governments were unaware of the "federation" plot, which seems to have been Richard's personal idea. Because Richard's partner Itō Hirobumi had been prime minister of Japan, the Japanese government might have known about Richard's plan, but there is no evidence to this effect.

A crisis over the issue of abdication emerged. Bowing to increasing pressure from the West and general civil discontent, Cixi did not forcibly remove Guangxu from the throne, although she attempted to have Pujun, a boy of 14 who was from a close branch of the imperial family, installed as crown prince. The Guangxu era nominally continued until his death in 1908, but the emperor lost all respect, power, and privileges, including his freedom of movement. Most of his supporters, including his political mentor Kang Youwei, fled into exile, and the six prominent reformers including Tan Sitong and Kang's younger brother, were publicly beheaded. Kang continued to work for a constitutional monarchy while in exile, remaining loyal to Guangxu and hoping to eventually restore him to power: his efforts would prove to be in vain.

=== Boxer Rebellion ===
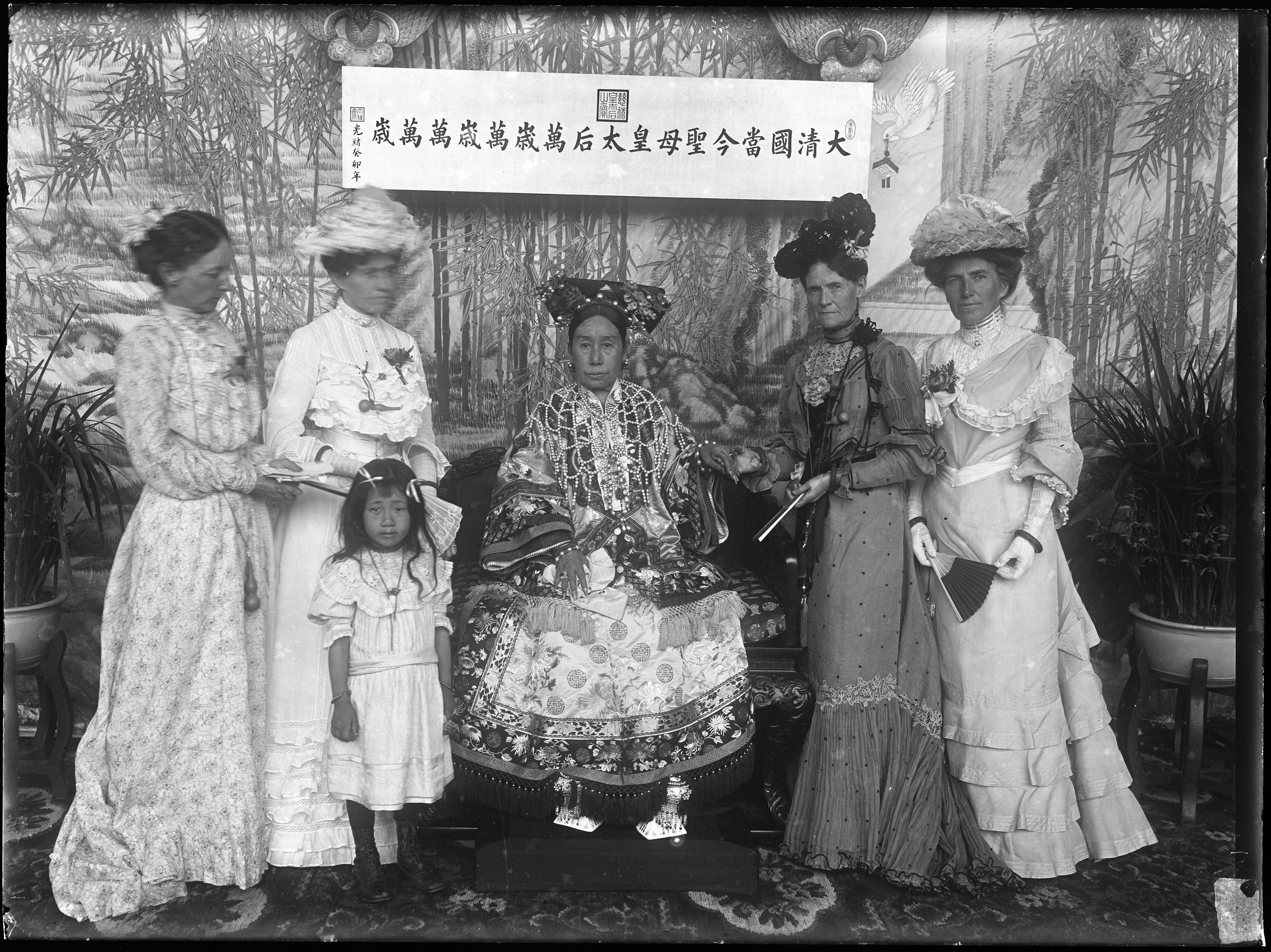
Empress Dowager Cixi and women of the American legation. Holding her hand is Sarah Pike Conger, the wife of U.S. Ambassador Edwin H. Conger.

In 1900, the Boxer Rebellion broke out in northern China. Perhaps fearing further foreign intervention, Cixi threw her support to these anti-foreign bands by making an official announcement of her support for the movement and a formal declaration of war on the Western powers.

However, the general Ronglu deliberately sabotaged the performance of the imperial army during the rebellion; Dong Fuxiang's Muslim troops (the "Kansu Braves") were able and eager to destroy the foreign military forces in the legations, but Ronglu stopped them from doing so. The Manchu prince Zaiyi was xenophobic and friendly with Dong Fuxiang. Zaiyi wanted artillery for Dong's troops to destroy the legations. Ronglu blocked the transfer of artillery to Zaiyi and Dong, preventing them from destroying the legations. When artillery was finally supplied to the imperial army and Boxers, it was done in only limited amounts: Ronglu deliberately held back the rest of them.

The Chinese forces defeated the small 2,000-man Western relief force at the Battle of Langfang, but lost several decisive battles, including the Battle of Beicang. The entire imperial court was forced to retreat as the forces of the Eight-Nation Alliance invaded Beijing. Because moderates at the Qing imperial court tried to appease the foreigners by moving the Muslim Kansu Braves out of their way, the allied army was able to march into Beijing and seize the capital.

During the war, Cixi displayed concern about China's situation and foreign aggression, saying, "Perhaps their magic is not to be relied upon; but can we not rely on the hearts and minds of the people? Today China is extremely weak. We have only the people's hearts and minds to depend upon. If we cast them aside and lose the people's hearts, what can we use to sustain the country?" The Chinese people were almost unanimous in their support for the Boxers due to the Western Allied invasion.

When Cixi received an ultimatum demanding that China surrender total control over all its military and financial affairs to foreigners, she defiantly stated before the Grand Council, "Now they [the Powers] have started the aggression, and the extinction of our nation is imminent. If we just fold our arms and yield to them, I would have no face to see our ancestors after death. If we must perish, why not fight to the death?" It was at this point that Cixi began to blockade the legations with the armies of the Peking Field Force, which began the siege.

Cixi stated that, "I have always been of the opinion, that the allied armies had been permitted to escape too easily in 1860. Only a united effort was then necessary to have given China the victory. Today, at last, the opportunity for revenge has come", and said that millions of Chinese would join the cause of fighting the foreigners since the Manchus had provided "great benefits" to China.

During the Battle of Beijing, the entire imperial court, including Cixi and Guangxu, fled Beijing and evacuated to Xi'an as the allied forces invaded the city. After the fall of Beijing, the Eight-Nation Alliance negotiated a treaty with the Qing government, sending messengers to the empress dowager in Xi'an. Included in the terms of the agreement was a guarantee that China would not have to give up any further territories to foreign powers.

Many of Cixi's advisers in the imperial court insisted that the war against the foreigners be continued; they recommended that Dong Fuxiang be given responsibility to continue the war effort. Cixi was practical, however, and decided that the terms were generous enough for her to acquiesce and stop the war, at least after she was assured of her continued reign when the war was concluded. The Western powers needed a government strong enough to suppress further anti-foreign movements, but too weak to act on its own; they supported the continuation of the Qing dynasty, rather than allowing it to be overthrown.

Cixi turned once more to Li Hongzhang to negotiate. Li agreed to sign the Boxer Protocol, which stipulated the presence of an international military force in Beijing and the payment of £67 million (almost $333 million) in war reparations. The United States used its share of the war indemnity to fund the creation of China's prestigious Tsinghua University. Guangxu and Cixi did not return to Beijing from Xi'an until roughly 18 months after their flight.

=== Return to Beijing and reforms ===
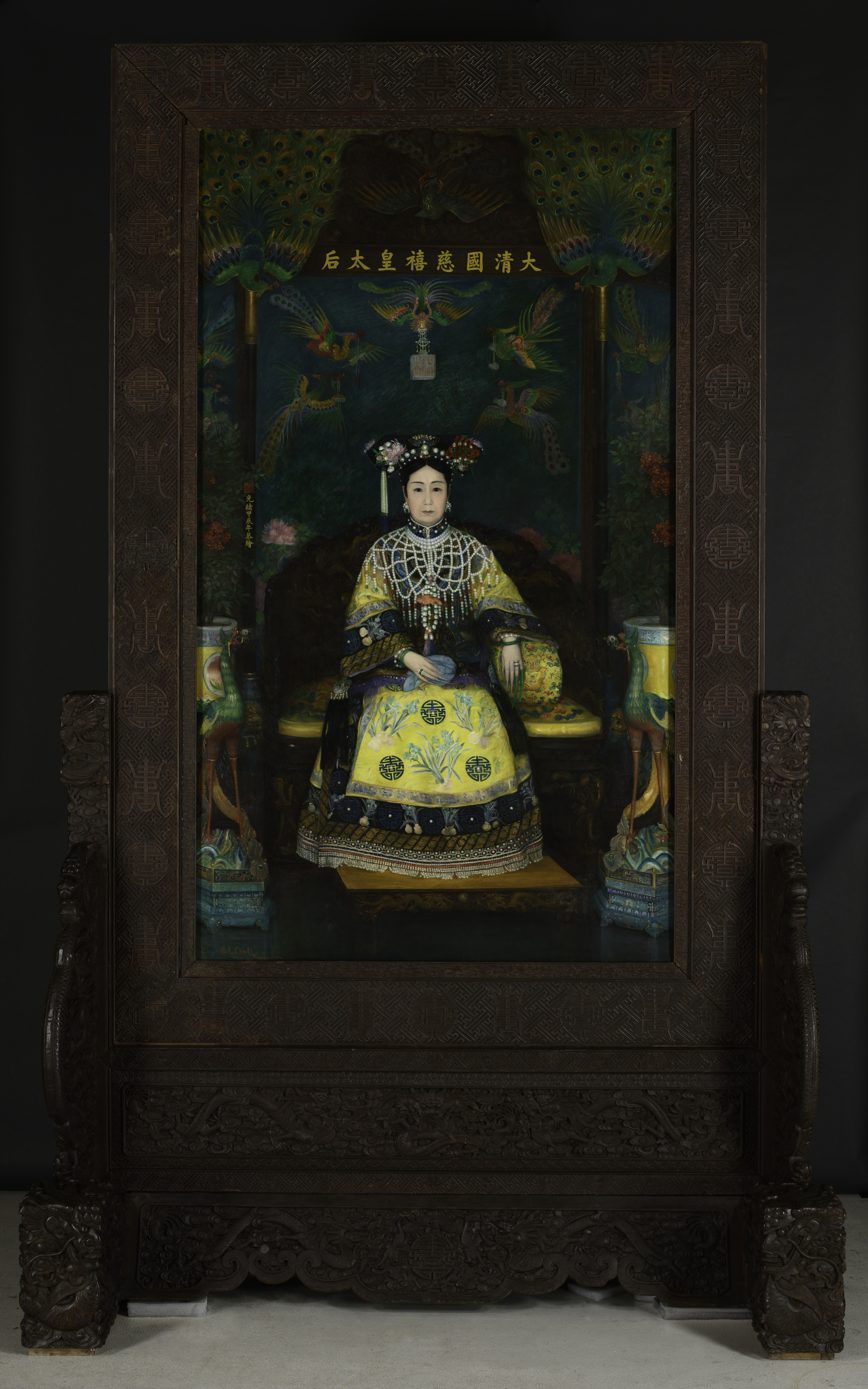
Empress Dowager Cixi by Katharine Carl, 1904, commissioned by Cixi for the Louisiana Purchase Exposition (St. Louis World's Fair) and later given to U.S. president Theodore Roosevelt, transferred to the Smithsonian Museum of American Art collections and later the Arthur M. Sackler Gallery of the Smithsonian Institution

In January 1902, Cixi, Guangxu, the empress, and the rest of the court made a ceremonious return to Beijing. At the railhead at Chengtingfu, Cixi and the court boarded a 21-car train to convey them the rest of the way to the capital. In Beijing, many of the legation women turned out to watch the procession from the Beijing railway station to the Forbidden City, and for the first time, commoners were permitted to watch as well.

Once back in the palace, Cixi implemented sweeping political reforms. High officials were dispatched to Japan and Europe to gather facts and draw up plans for administrative reforms in law, education, government structure, and social policy, many of which were modeled on the reforms of the Meiji Restoration. The abolition of the examination system in 1905 was only the most visible of these sweeping reforms. Furthermore, Cixi sponsored the implementation of the New Policies, a reform program more radical than the one proposed by the reformers she had beheaded in 1898.

In an attempt to win over the foreigners, Cixi also invited the wives of the diplomatic corps to a tea in the Forbidden City soon after her return, and in time, would hold summer garden parties for the foreign community at the Summer Palace. In 1903, she acquiesced to the request of Sarah Conger, wife of Edwin H. Conger, the U.S. Ambassador to China, to have her portrait painted by American artist Katharine Carl for the St. Louis World's Fair. Between 1903 and 1905, Cixi had a Western-educated lady-in-waiting by the name of Yu Deling, along with her sister, Yu Rongling, and mother, serve at her court. Yu Deling, fluent in English and French, as well as Chinese, often served as a translator at meetings with the wives of the diplomatic corps.

In 1903, Cixi allowed a young aristocratic photographer named Yu Xunling, a brother of Yu Deling, to take elaborately staged shots of her and her court. They were designed to convey imperial authority, aesthetic refinement, and religious piety. As the only photographic series taken of Cixi—the supreme leader of China for more than 45 years—it represents a unique convergence of Qing court pictorial traditions, modern photographic techniques, and Western standards of artistic portraiture. The rare glass plates have been blown up into full-size images, included in the exhibition "The Empress Dowager" at the Arthur M. Sackler Gallery, Smithsonian Institution, Washington, D.C.

== Death ==
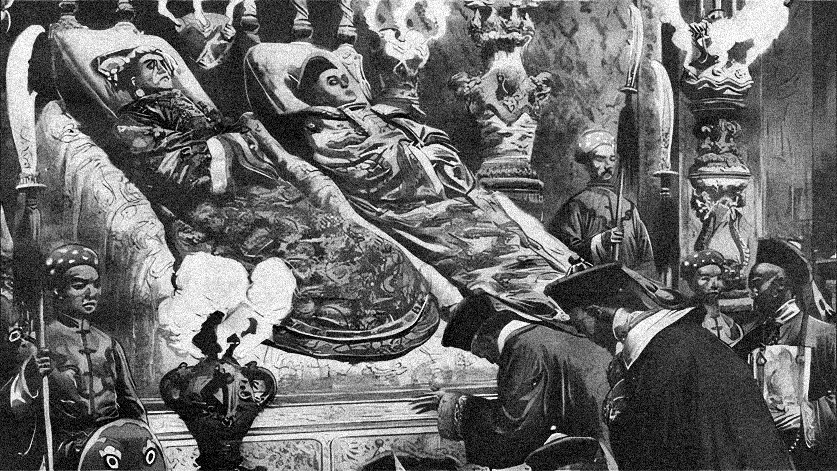
The Dowager Empress Cixi and the Guangxu Emperor, laying in-state, 1909 French newspaper cut

On 15 November 1908, Cixi died in the Hall of Graceful Bird at the Middle Sea (中海儀鸞殿) of Zhongnanhai, Beijing, only a day after the Guangxu Emperor died. Radicals greeted the news with scorn. The anarchist Wu Zhihui, who had leveled some of the most vitriol at Cixi in life, wrote from exile in Paris of the "vixen empress and vermin emperor" that "their lingering stench makes me vomit." The childless Guangxu Emperor was succeeded by Cixi's choice as heir, his nephew Puyi, who took the regnal name "Xuantong".

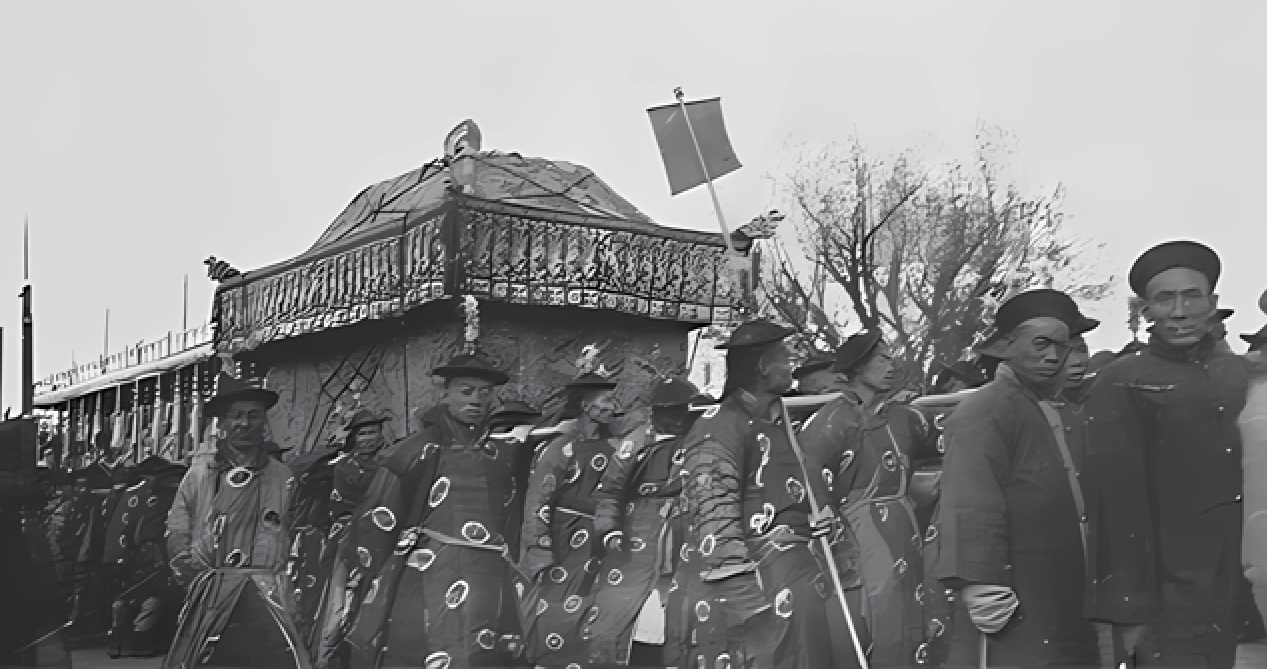
Funerary procession of the Empress Dowager Cixi

On 4 November 2008, forensic tests revealed that the level of arsenic in the Guangxu Emperor's remains was 2,000 times higher than that of ordinary people. Scientists concluded that the poison could only have been administered in a high dose at one time. For a long time prior to this, there had been several existing theories about the emperor's death, none of which was accepted fully by historians. Most were inclined to believe that Cixi, herself very ill, poisoned the Guangxu Emperor because she was afraid he would reverse her policies after her death.

Dai Yi, a historian, speculated that Cixi might have known of her imminent death and worried that the Guangxu Emperor would continue his reforms after her death. Another theory is that the Guangxu Emperor was poisoned by Yuan Shikai, who expected that if the emperor returned to power again, Yuan would likely be convicted, and then executed for treason. There is currently no definitive evidence as to who assassinated the Guangxu Emperor.

=== Funerary procession ===
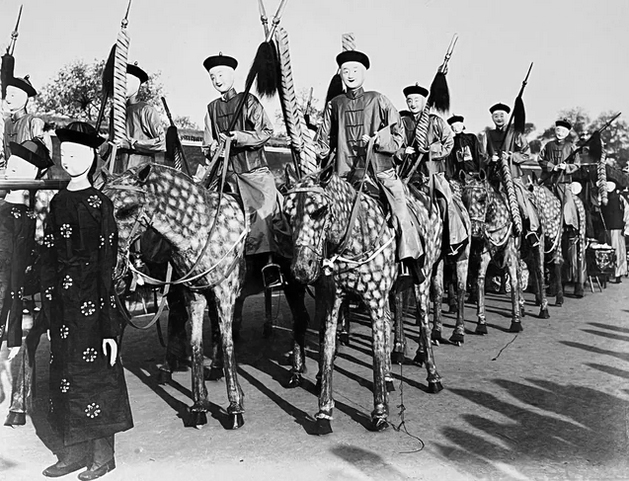
Life-size paper cavalry effigies accompanying Cixi's funerary processions, subsequently burned to accompany her in the afterlife

The entirety of the Empress Dowager Cixi's funerary procession reflected much of her lifestyle when she was alive—one of opulence and luxurious grandeur. It allegedly exceeded 10,000 people, with almost 8,000 of these being volunteer pall-bearers who carried the coffin, in rotation, for some 120 km (75 mi) from Beijing to her final resting place located in Zunhua, Hebei province—a journey that took five days to complete.

Leading the forefront were Manchu spear-cavalry men accompanied by fleets of horses, selections of Qing nobles, and servants. Among the living, Cixi's procession was also accompanied by a myriad of paper effigies of soldiers, horses, servants and entertainers which were then subsequently set alight and burned—due to a belief that they would be sent to serve her in the afterlife, presumably a ritualistic act not too dissimilar to the purposes that reflected the Terracotta Army of the First Emperor of China.

=== Burial ===
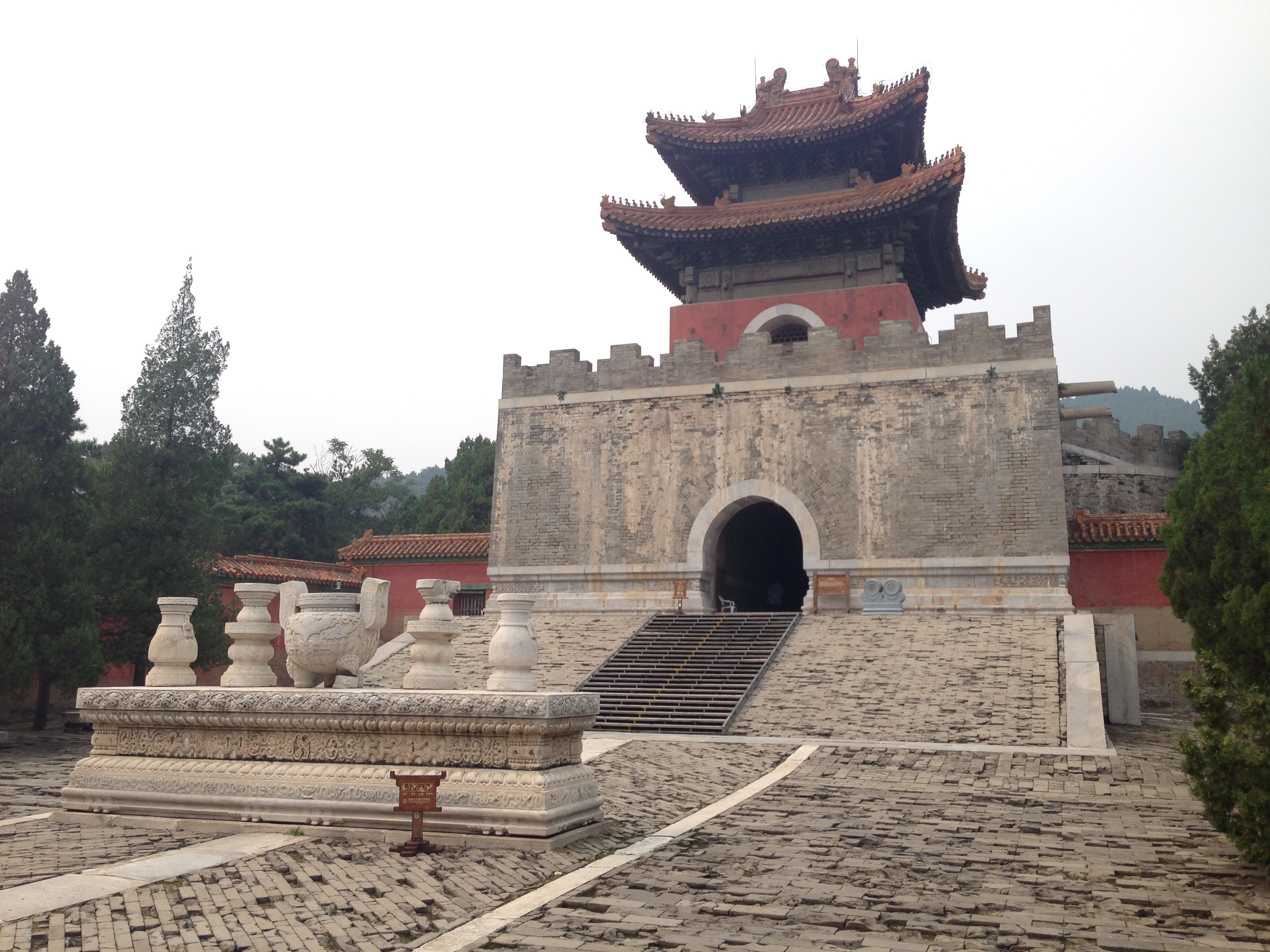
Memorial tower of Cixi's tomb, at the Putuoyu Eastern Ding Mausoleum

Empress Dowager Cixi was ultimately interred amidst the Eastern Qing tombs, in the Eastern Ding Mausoleum (東定陵), along with Empress Dowager Ci'an. Empress Dowager Ci'an lies in the Puxiangyu Eastern Ding Mausoleum (普祥峪定東陵; lit. "Tomb East of the Ding Mausoleum in the Broad Valley of Good Omen"), while Empress Dowager Cixi built herself the much larger Putuoyu Eastern Ding Mausoleum (菩陀峪定東陵; lit. "Tomb East of the Ding Mausoleum in the Putuo Valley"). The Ding Mausoleum (lit. "Tomb of Quietude"), where the Xianfeng Emperor is buried, is located west of the Dingdongling. The Putuo Valley owes its name to Mount Putuo, one of the Four Sacred Buddhist Mountains of China.

Cixi, unsatisfied with her original tomb, ordered its destruction and reconstruction in 1895. The new tomb was a complex of temples, gates, and pavilions, covered with gold leaf and with gold and gilded-bronze ornaments hanging from the beams and the eaves. The Eastern Mausoleum, together with other Imperial Tombs of the Ming and Qing Dynasties, are now protected legally by central and local governments, along with a protection and management system put in place to improve the conservation and management of the tombs, which are included in the UNESCO World Heritage List.

== Desecration and looting ==
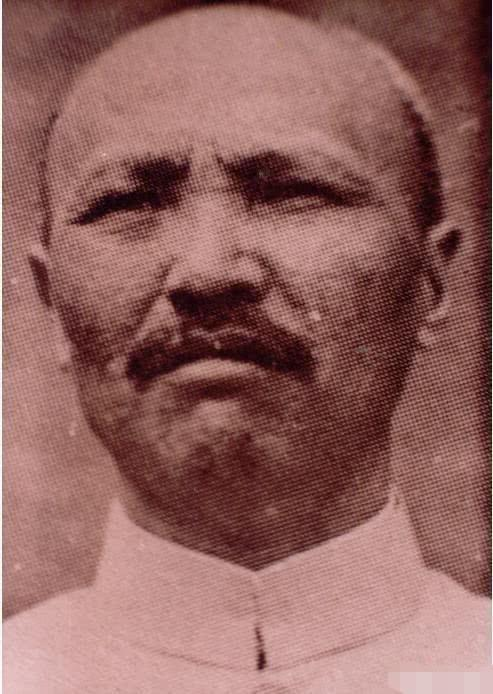
Sun Dianying, the Chinese former warlord who perpetrated the 1928 ransacking of the Cixi's tomb

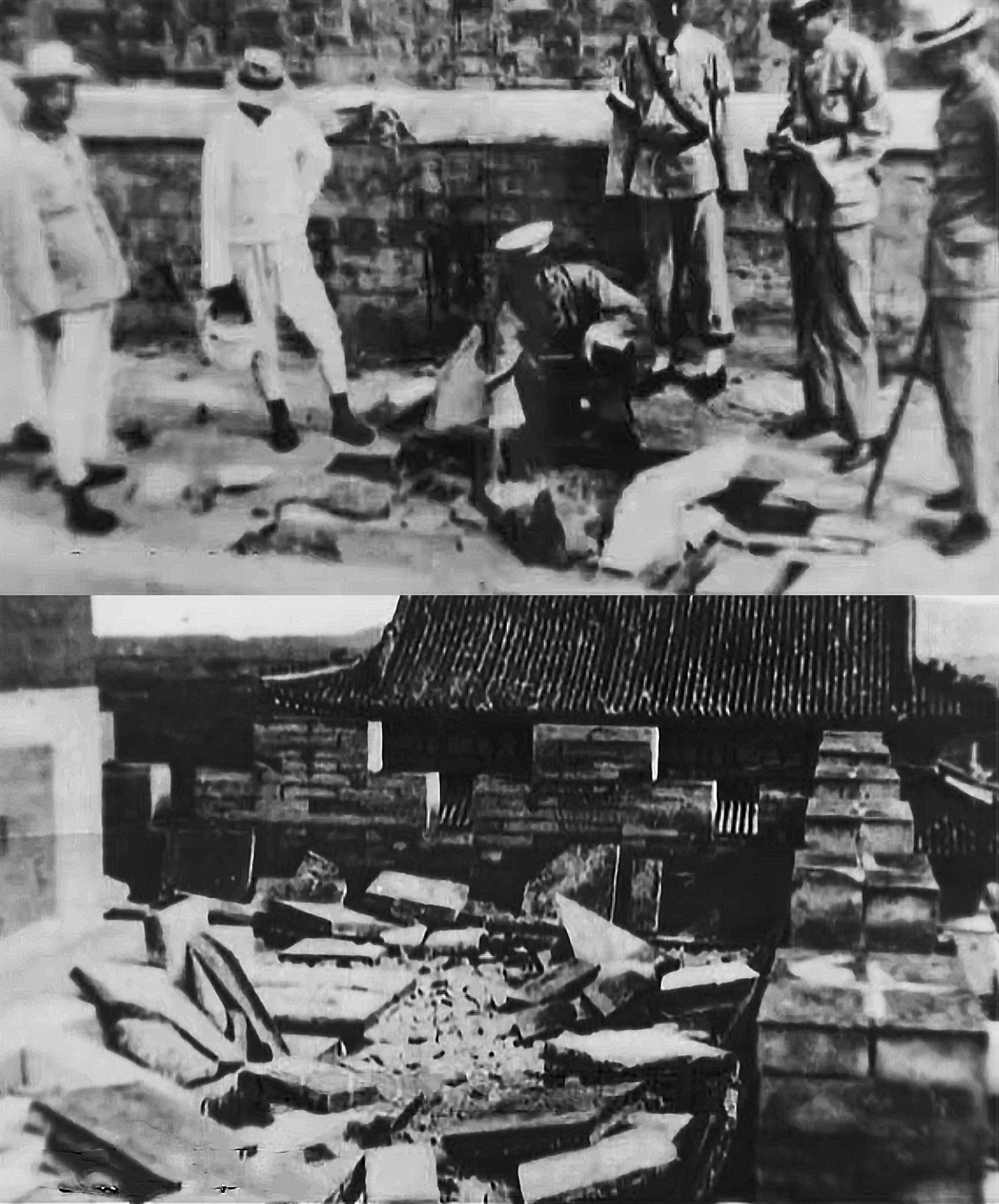
Sun Dianying's men utilized pickaxes and garden hoes in their initial attempts at locating the tomb entrance; causing extensive external damage.

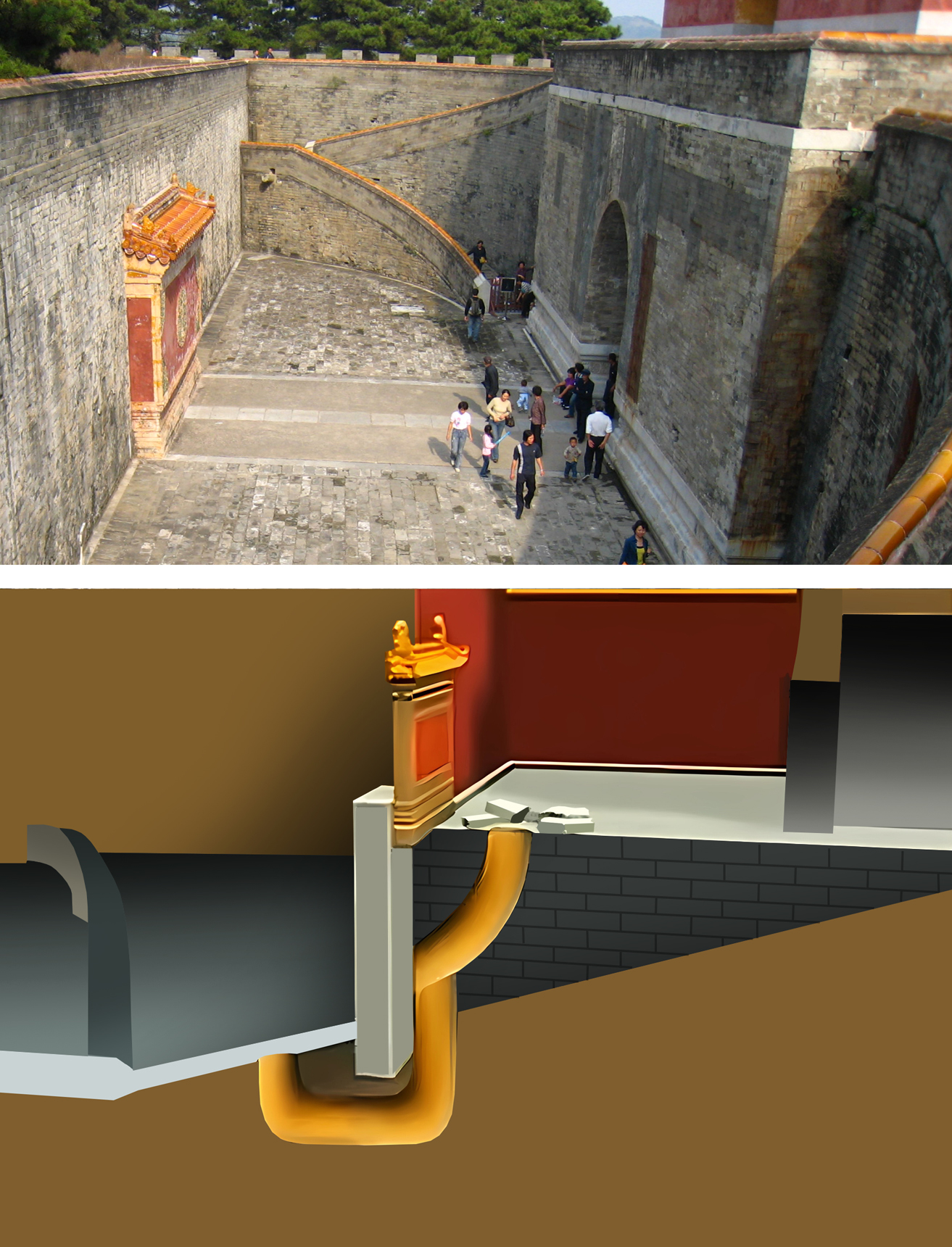
Diagram of the 'sealing-wall' of the Guangxu Emperor's tomb, bypassed via digging in the 1938 looting incident. In Cixi's case, it was breached via dynamite.

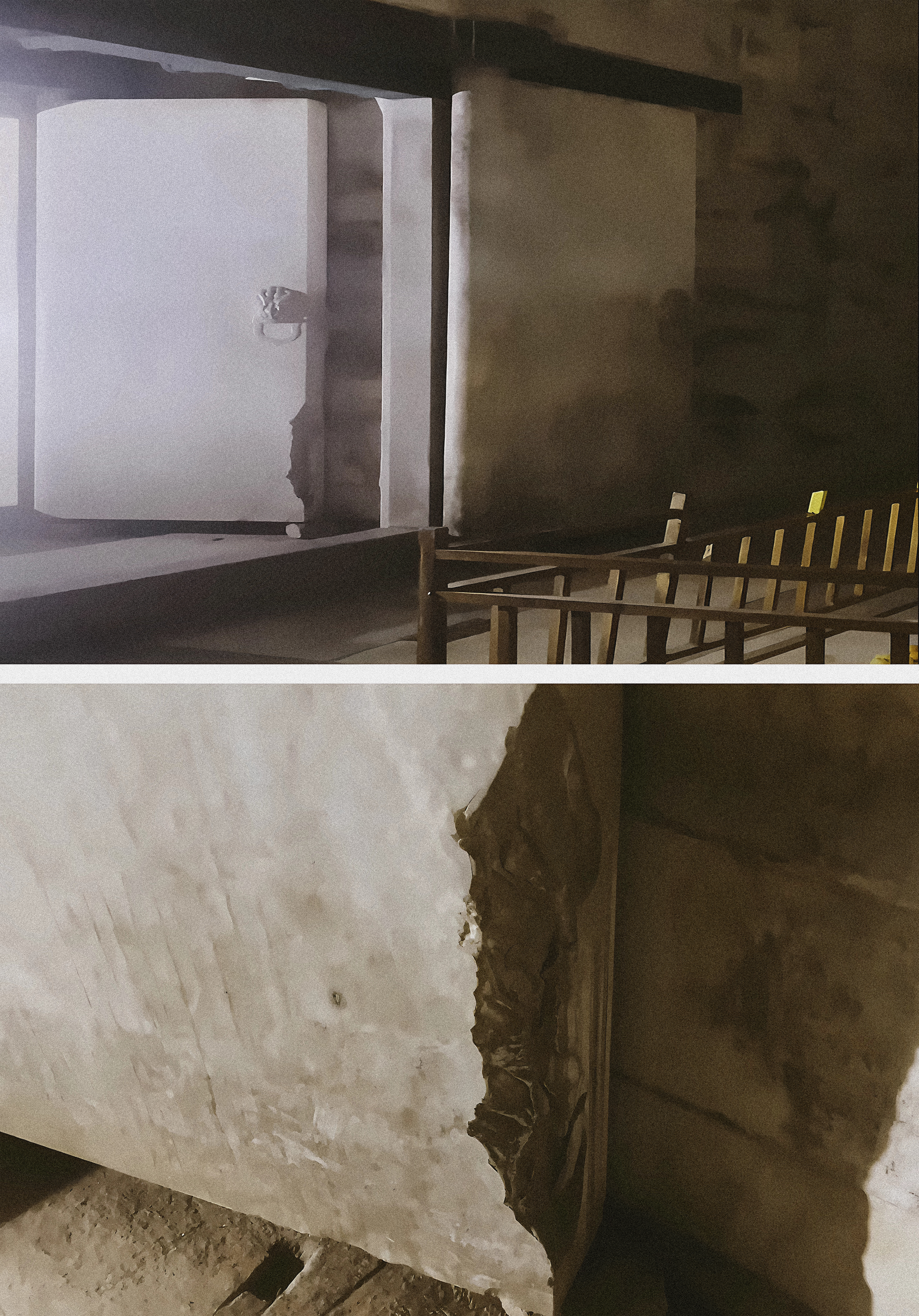
Damage to the right-most burial-chamber stone gate caused by initial failed breaching attempt via hand tools

On 12 July 1928, corruption within the Nationalist government, compounded by the recent conclusion of the strenuous Northern Expedition, resulted in an army garrison stationed near Zunhua, Hebei province to experience logistical and financial difficulties: unable to consistently provide sustenance or pay the troop's wages on time. The commander of this garrison, notorious former warlord Sun Dianying, decided to enact a wide-scale grave robbery of Cixi's Mausoleum within the nearby Eastern Qing Tombs as an alternative source of funding.

The Empress Dowager Cixi had been known for her opulent and lavish lifestyle choices, so her mausoleum was the first to be targeted. Sun Dianying gave first priority to officers above the level of battalion commander to collect treasure for themselves—ordinary soldiers were eventually allowed to take the leftovers. Cixi's above-ground memorial hall was the most prominent and easily accessible structure and, upon entering, the thieves tore down the gold and brass dragon ornaments that enveloped the structure's pillars and stole the myriad of ornaments and gold medallions from the beams and eaves of the building.

Upon reaching her tomb-mound at the rear of the complex, it was realized that none amongst the perpetrators were familiar of complete layout and design of the tomb and its burial chamber. After multiple initial failed attempts at locating the burial chamber's entrance via arbitrary digging and liberal use of dynamite (resulting in extensive structural damage), a suspected former tomb-keeper from the nearby Malanyu village was brought forth, and violently interrogated into revealing exact location of the tomb's sealed entrance. Locating the burial chamber's entrance after only a meter of vertical digging whilst under the tomb-keeper's guidance, the looters were met by the first major obstacle; the tomb's foot-thick sealing-wall ('Diamond Wall') whose durability made it almost impervious to all pickaxes, shovels and garden hoes equipped on hand.

Further use of dynamite by the engineering corps were therefore required to breach this seal—opening the passage that lead into the underground palace. Traveling down the burial chamber passageway, the perpetrators reached the final major obstacle: two heavy yet durable sets of marble gates that now divided the burial chamber and the coffin itself, from the outside world. Ignorant of the locking mechanism of this door, Sun Dianying's men first attempted to hack down and cut at the door with pickaxes and shovels that were on hand, but to no avail (damage to the doors of which are still visible today). Peering in through the narrow slit between these doors revealed that it was barricaded by an angled bar of carved marble that served as the locking mechanism and, knowing that, was then circumvented by having it set backwards to its original position via the combined use of steel wires and thin ropes to serve as a crude pulley system.

After the gates were bypassed, the vermilion coffin of the Empress Dowager that now stood before the men. Inside was found the embalmed and considerably still well-preserved corpse of Cixi herself, wrapped in three layers of gold brocade and an additional layer of pearl approximately a foot thick were laid around at the bottom of the coffin. On her head was a Qing imperial red-and-black Phoenix crown also adorned with pearls, with the largest that topped the crown purportedly being almost the diameter of that of a robin's egg. In addition to this were jade and tourmaline coral and lotus leaf sculptures respectively, placed at her head and foot. Within the coffin surrounding her corpse were also multiple small sculptures of horses, Arhats, Buddhas and Guanyin (Goddess of Mercy) figurines carved of gold, jade, emerald and various other gemstones. At either side of her feet were laid carved sculptures of jadeite watermelon slices, oriental fragrant melons, carved Jadeite Cabbage sculptures and multiple gemstone-carved peaches, plums, apricots and dates. Encapsulating both the corpse and immense treasure were the four wooden walls of the coffin itself, entirely engraved with multiple golden Sanskrit excerpt passages of the Amitābha and Amitāyus Sutras, that contained blessings for Cixi's reincarnation and entry into 'The Buddhist Pure Land'—a blissful spiritual place described as having wonderful adornments including jeweled ponds, colorful jeweled lotuses, raining flowers and jeweled trees that 'make the sounds of the Dharma'.

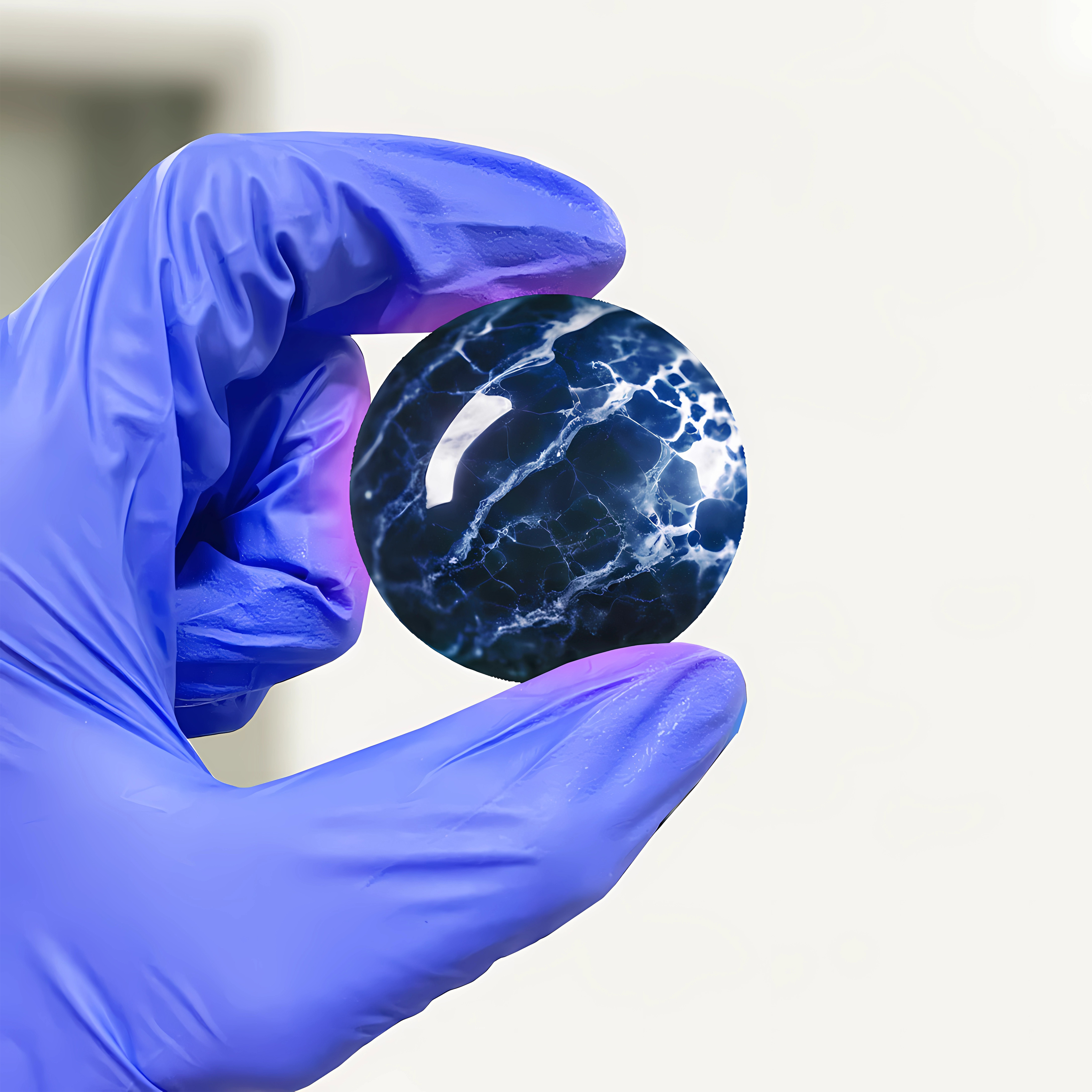
The purported fluorescent-like properties of the 'Night Pearl' possibly suggests a carved sphere consisting of fluorite, rather than a typical marine-pearl.

The looters first dragged the Empress Dowager's corpse out of the coffin and discarded her aside, before proceeding to grab at the largest treasured objects that had been previously placed around her corpse, such as the Buddha statues, jadeite watermelons, jade coral and vegetables. They snatched at the objects found beneath the body, ravaged the corpse itself—taking her imperial robe; tearing off her gold-threaded undergarments, shoes and socks, and stealing all the pearls and jewels on her body. The looters even violently pried open her jaws with bayonet blades and rifle-butts in their hasty quest to extract the legendary 'Yemingzu' ('夜明珠' lit. 'Night-Pearl') described as having light-emitting fluorescent-like properties, that had purportedly been placed in Cixi's mouth following her death (to supposedly protect her corpse from decomposing, in accordance with Chinese folk tradition). Ultimately, they looted all the objects under the coffin that had been favorites of Cixi when she was alive. Cixi's burial garments and socks, due to having been soiled by her corpse over the course of twenty years, were subsequently discarded by the perpetrators, but not before all the sewn jewels and pearls were violently torn away. These surviving garments were recovered, restored and publicly displayed at the China National Silk Museum. The adjacent Yu Mausoleum of the Qianlong Emperor was also ransacked and looted under similar fashion.

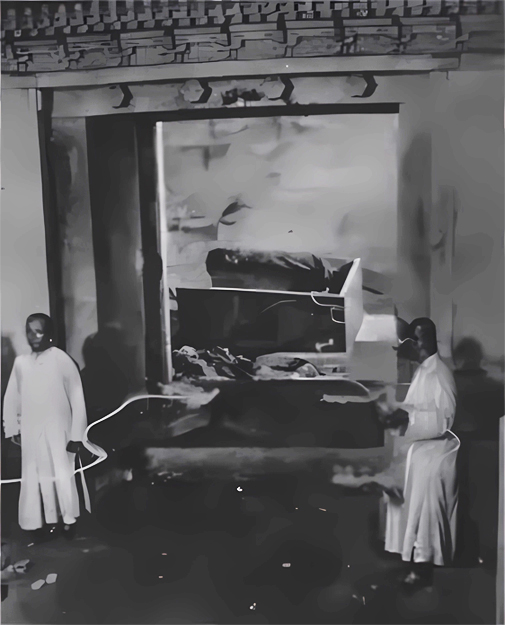
State of the burial chamber of the Empress Dowager Cixi's tomb, photographed as part of the post-1928 looting investigations. Her discarded corpse, burial shroud and damaged coffin are visible in the background.

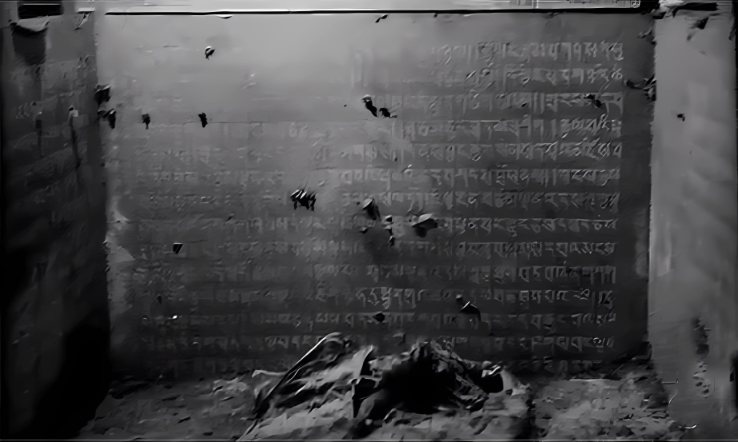
Interior of Cixi's inner coffin as photographed by the post-1928 looting investigation, displaying engraved excerpts from the Amitābha and Amitāyus Sutras

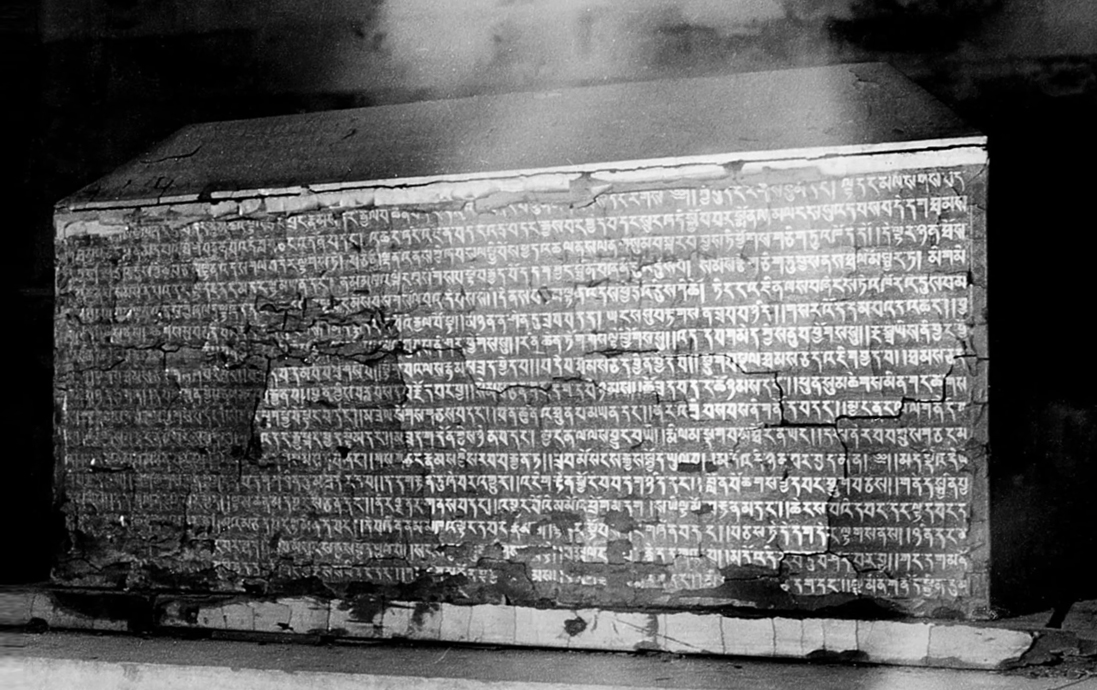
Photograph of inner layer of the Empress Dowager Longyu's coffin, whose design was appropriated from Cixi's own

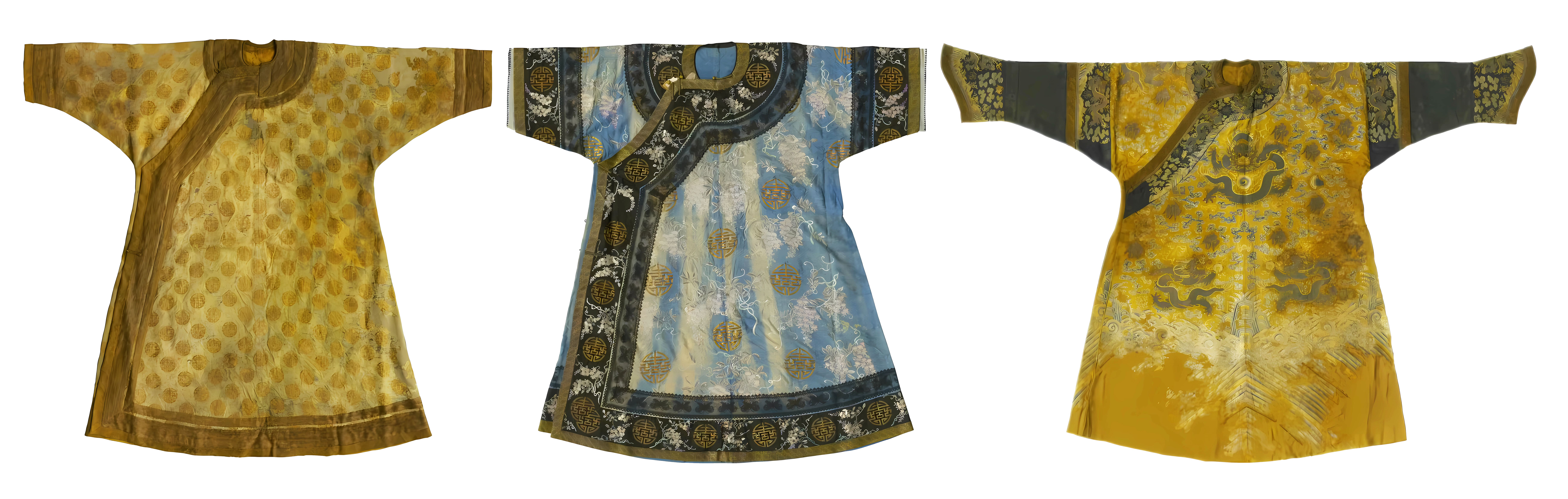
Recovered three-layer burial garments of Cixi, restored by the China National Silk Museum

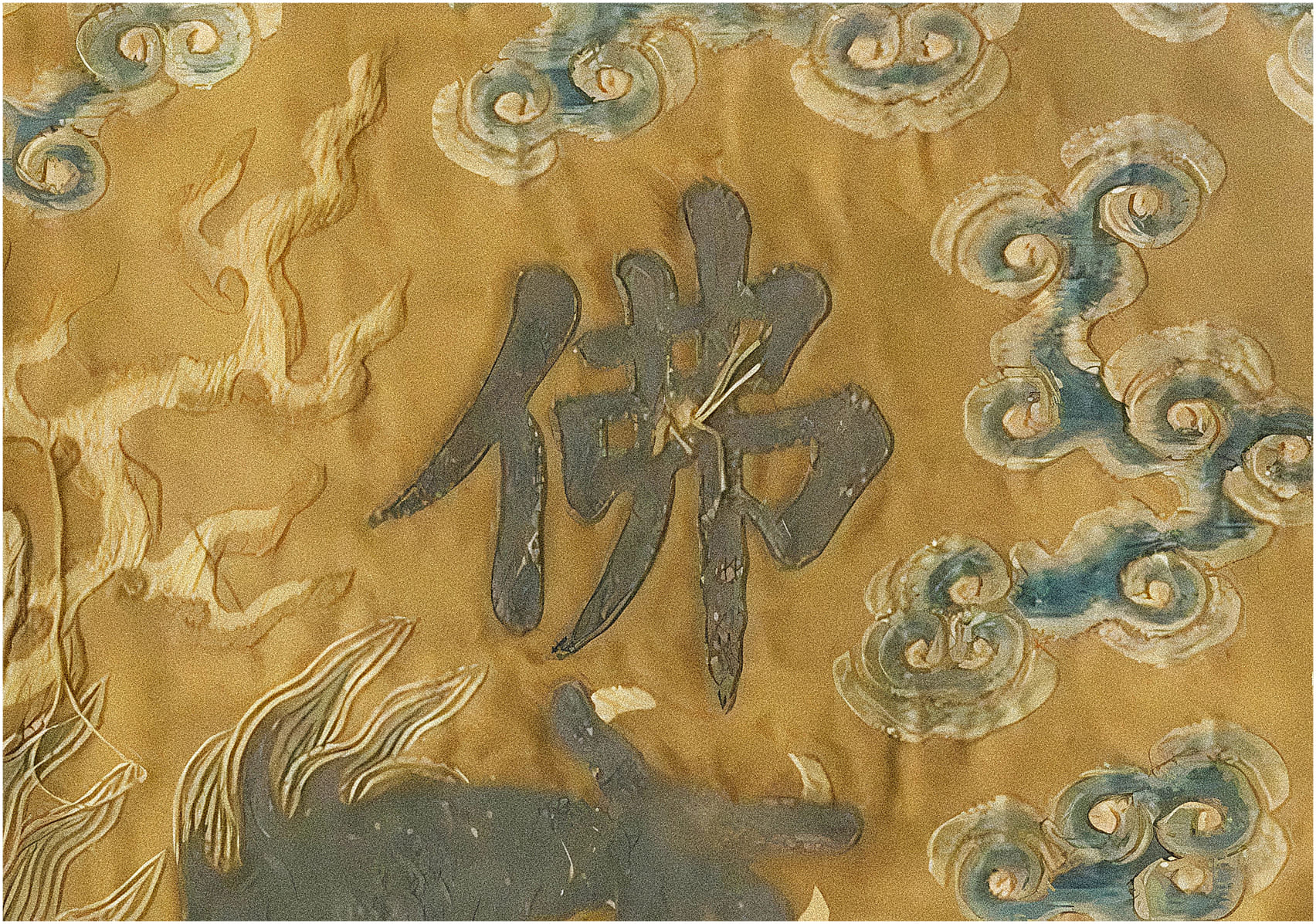
Detail of outer-most burial garment. The loose threads over the Chinese character for Buddha ('佛') was the former position of a sewn pearl, prior to it being violently torn away.

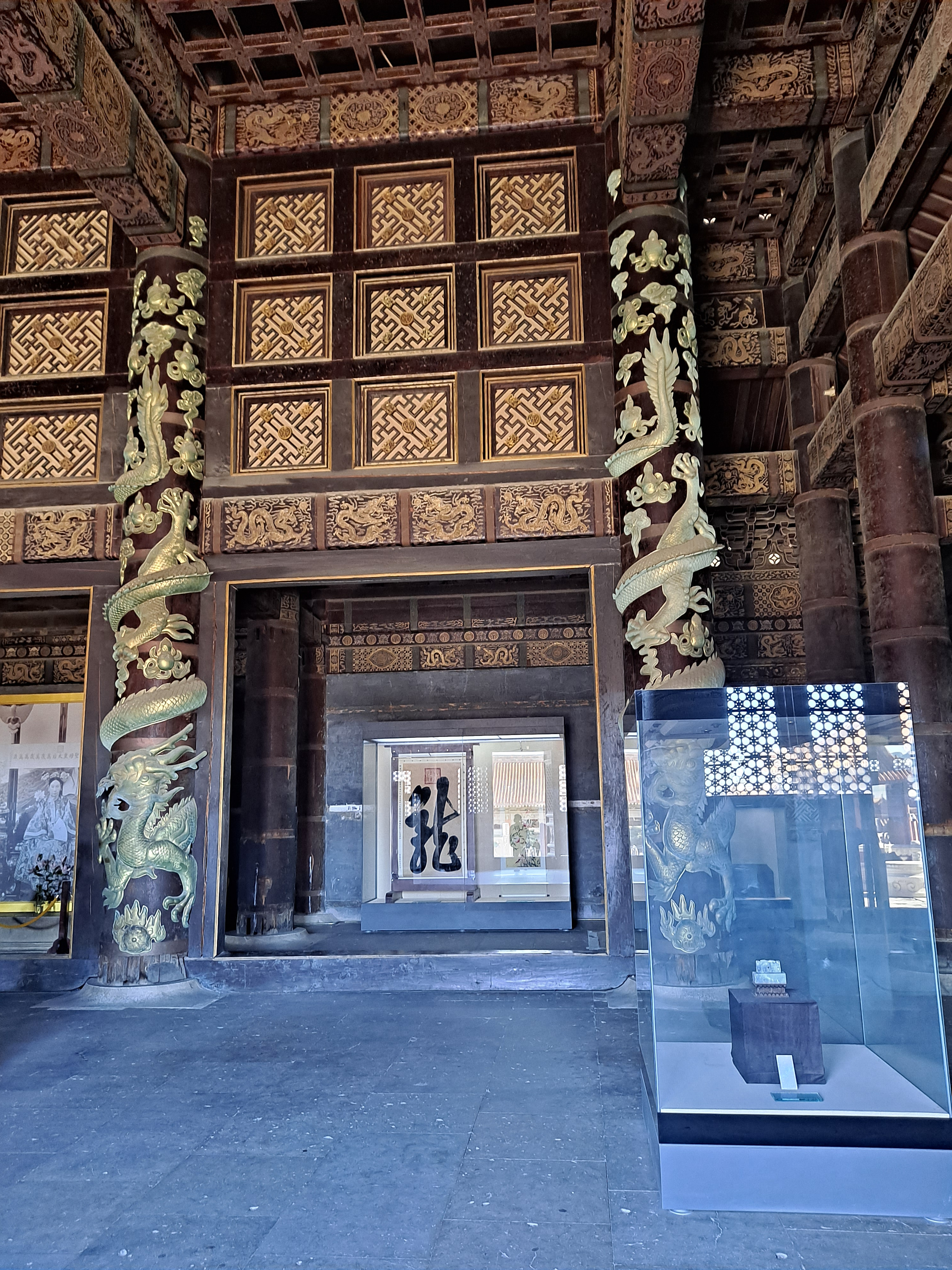
Gold-dragon decor replicas on the beams and eaves of Cixi's above-ground memorial hall; the originals were torn down and stolen during the 1928 looting.

=== Beijing antiquities brokerage incident ===
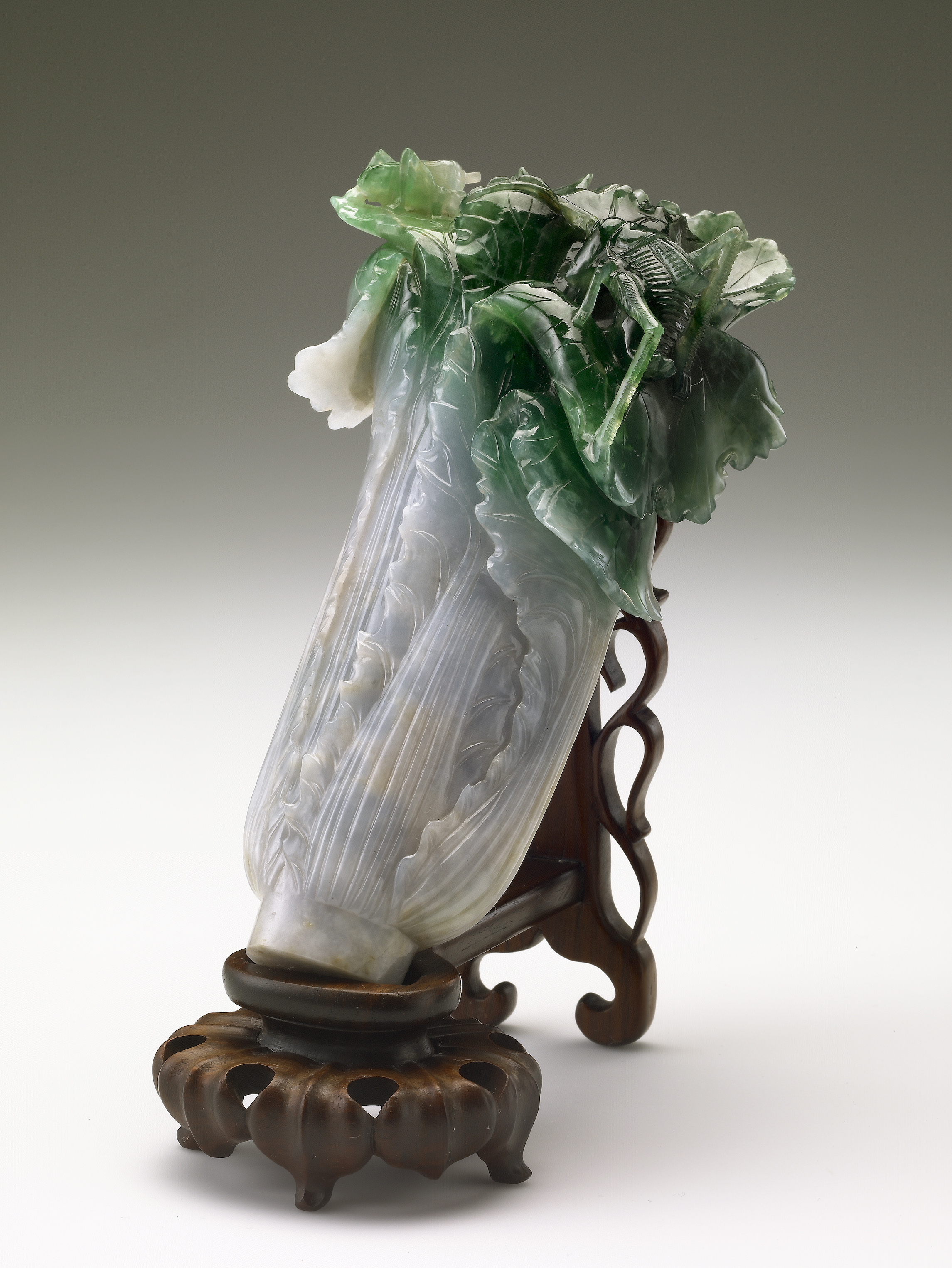
A Jadeite Cabbage sculpture, from the National Palace Museum.

On the days of the looting incident, a soldier, still in uniform, reportedly arrived at a shop belonging to an antiquities broker in Beijing aiming to sell off a significant amount of valuable items that he had brought forth—all at once. Presumably in an attempt to garner a higher appraisal of value, the soldier arrogantly boasted that the items were looting from the tomb of the Empress Dowager Cixi. The extremely regal, and valuable nature of the purported items instantly attracted the attention of fellow store patrons, outside bystanders and a coincidental passing patrol of law enforcement alike. Both the soldier and the broker were subsequently arrested and transferred to the Peking Garrison Command for questioning—the suspect was revealed to be a subordinate of Sun Dianying and, under interrogation, disclosed the details of the ongoing looting operation and the source of the treasures. Sun Dianying was named as the organizer, and mastermind of the plot.

=== Public reaction ===
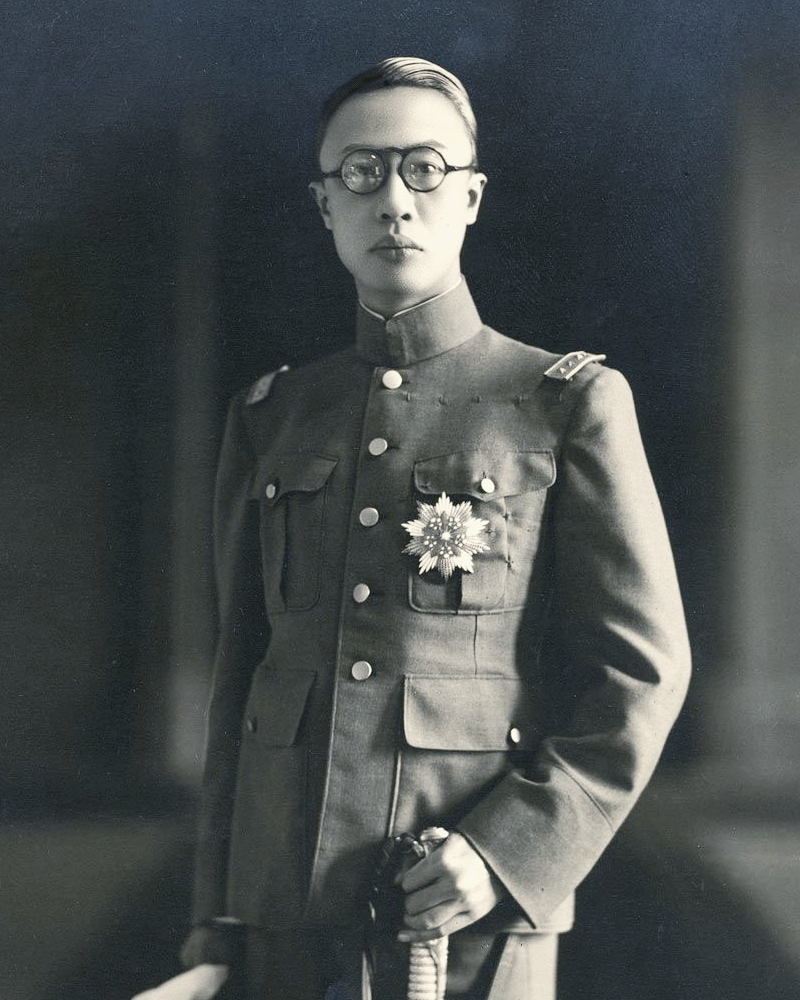
The failure in the Nationalist government in their agreed adherence in protecting the Imperial mausoleums greatly outraged the former-emperor Puyi, and contributed to his later increased sympathies with the Japanese Empire.

By near the end of June of that year a combination of hearsay, rumors and published news of the massive looting operations in and around the mausoleum of Cixi had spread past Hebei and had already reached as far as Beijing and Tianjin.

Public perception to the news of the looting both within China and around the world, were mixed. Cixi herself, having been a very controversial figure throughout her life, was interpreted by some as a crude form of karmic retribution. Other's perceptions to the crime were more negative. China's dethroned last emperor Puyi, upon hearing the news, sent telegrams to Chiang Kai-shek, Yan Xishan, Commander of Garrison Force in Beijing, the Central Committee of the Kuomintang, and local newspapers, demanding strict investigation of the looting, and requested for Sun Dianying to be sentenced to death. The crime, perpetrated by Sun Dianying, whose forces were part of the wing of the Nationalist military, was seen as a betrayal, and was one of the major contributing factors to Puyi's later increased sympathies with the Japanese Empire. Many others within Chinese society also similarly requested for punishment.

With both his name and complicity of the crime being widely circulated within national news, the increasingly paranoid Sun Dianying therefore chose to bribe those who were in a position to discipline him, in an effort to delay or prevent any legal or punitive action that would otherwise be taken against him, with some of the treasures both he and his subordinates obtained from Cixi. Combined with the myriad of other ongoing military and political crises that plagued both the country and the Nationalist government, nothing was ultimately done, and the former warlord went unpunished.

To whom was bribed, with what items, and the amount of said items used to pay for the bribery, is to this day largely a matter of hearsay, conspiracy theories, popular rumors, allegations and unsubstantiated accusations. In mainland China, the most popularly perpetuated rumors alleges the former warlord, to varying degrees of success, bribed the four major families of the Kuomintang and other high-ranking members of the Republican political and military elites.

The most popularly accused, and the treasures with which they were allegedly bribed with, are:

- Soong Tzu-wen: A jadeite watermelon sculpture from Cixi's tomb.
- Soong Mei-ling: The 'Yemingzu' ('夜明珠' lit. 'Night-Pearl') once contained in the mouth of Cixi, and an additional bag of pearls.
- Xu Yuanquan: Emerald leaves from atop a Guanyin sculpture, a gold Buddha, a ruby Buddha, and a bag of pearls from Cixi's tomb.
- Shang Zhen: A jadeite oriental fragrant melon sculpture from Cixi's tomb.
- Yan Xishan: A gold Buddha, emerald peaches from Cixi's Mausoleum, and a jade-ring worn by the Qianlong Emperor's corpse, and ivory from the adjacent Yu Mausoleum.
- Kong Xianxi: Two strings of gemstones from the shoes of Cixi's corpse, a Jadeite Cabbage from Cixi's coffin, and a bag of pearls.
- Dai Li: The two largest scarlet bead necklaces from the neck of the Qianlong Emperor.
- Chiang Kai-shek: A 'Nine-Dragon Sword' looted from the nearby Qianlong Emperor's mausoleum. Allegedly first given to Dai Li, to be then gifted personally to Chaing Kai-shek himself, before being destroyed in the plane crash that killed the former on 17 March 1946.
- Wang Zhonglian: Large amount of gold and other various stolen treasures, allegedly bribed by Sun Dianying after the end of the Second Sino-Japanese War in exchange for promotions and military duties.

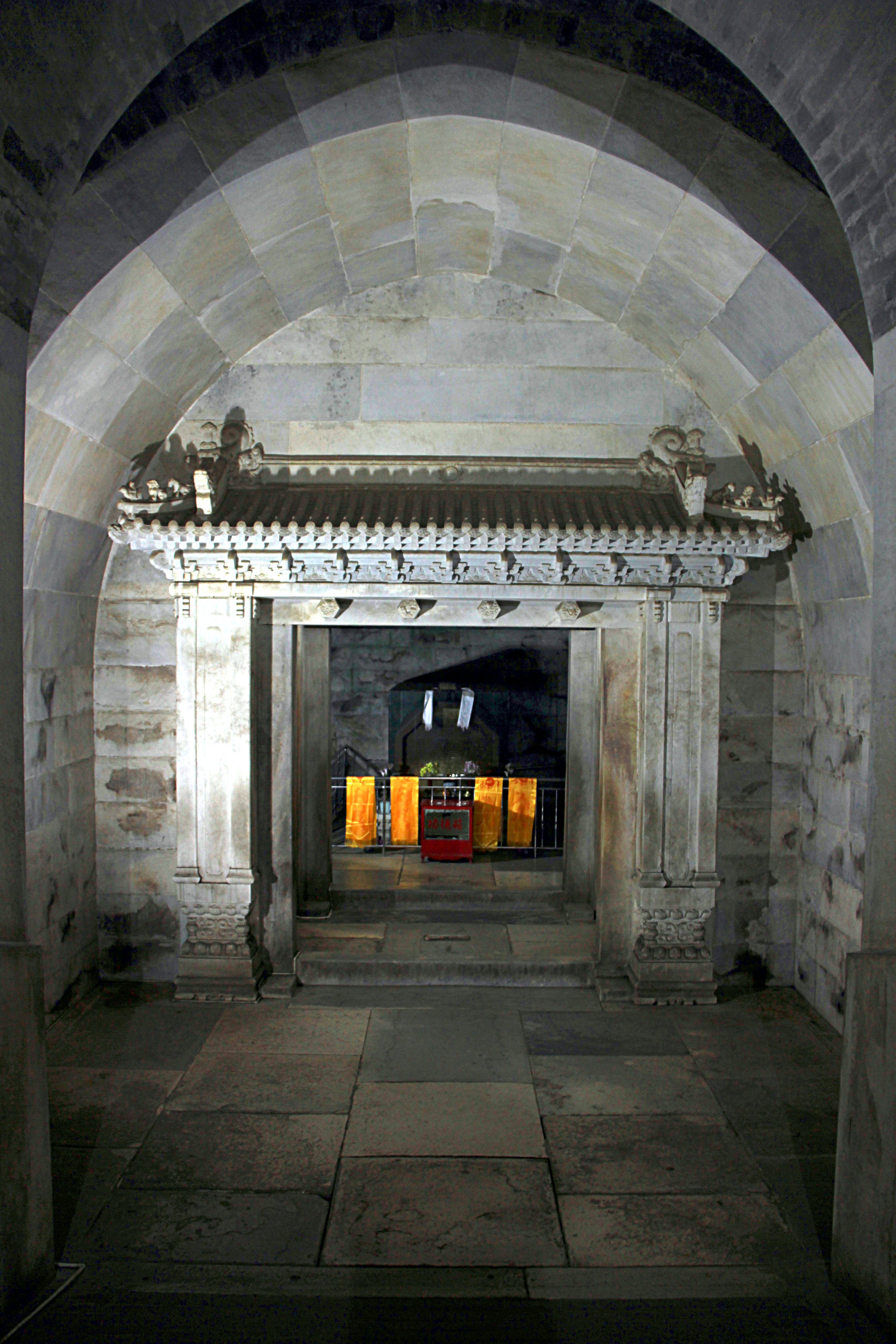
Cixi's restored coffin and burial chamber as it appears in 2011, now accessible to the public.

As there currently remains no reliable substantial proof or reputable historical evidence that any of the accused ever owned or received these treasures, nor did their successive family members, relatives or close associates publicly disclose and make admissions of such, the cultural relics looted from Cixi's mausoleum are largely regarded as being lost; having most likely already been traded and circulated around various parts the world, stored as collector's items, or some portion possibly damaged beyond recognition, their fates unknown and remaining a matter of historical contention.

As Puyi was residing in Tianjin at the time of the incident, a letter request of dispatch was sent to the former Qing-noble Zaize to evaluate the status of the mausoleum complex on his behalf, and to make arrangements for any re-interment and repairs where deemed necessary. The remains of Cixi, the Qianlong Emperor, his empress and concubines were hastily re-buried, with additional restoration work on the tombs, burial chambers and coffins also undertaken. Sun Dianying and his army carted off some of China's greatest treasures, but some things could not be easily removed, and the imposing buildings of Cixi's mausoleum complex still survive, and are now open to the public.

== Legacy ==
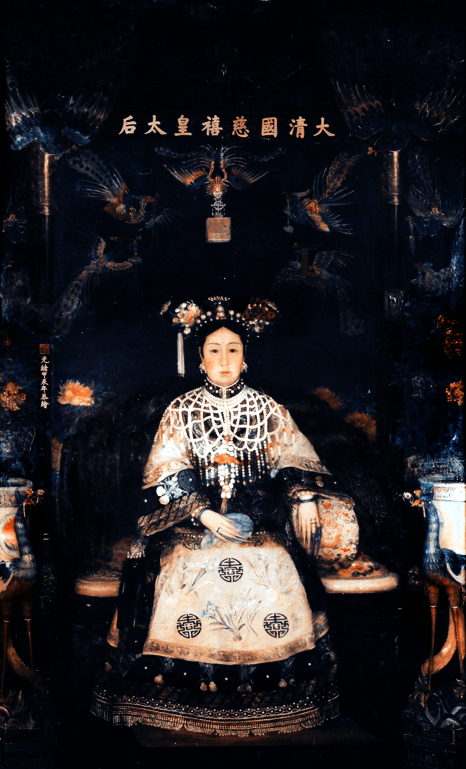
Katharine Carl oil portrait painted for exhibit at St. Louis World's Fair of 1904

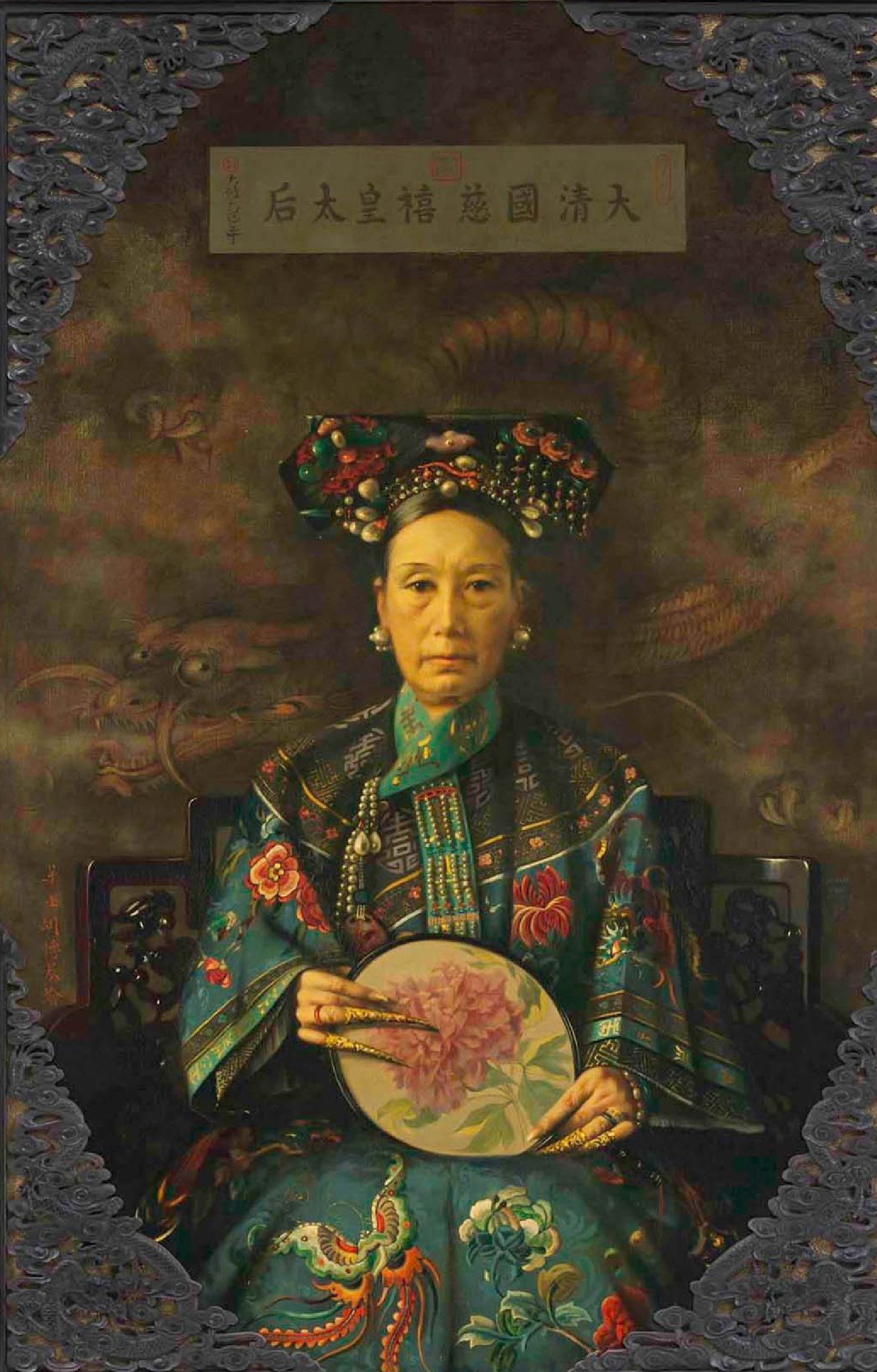
Portrait by Hubert Vos, 1905

The current and widely agreed upon view of Cixi is that she was a devious despot who contributed to China's slide into corruption, chaos, and revolution. Her hardline conservative and anti-reform stance still contributes to her negative legacy in modern China. Cixi used her power to accumulate vast quantities of money, bullion, antiques and jewelry, using the revenues of the state as her own. The long-time China journalist Jasper Becker recalled that "every visitor to the Summer Palace is shown the beautiful lakeside pavilion in the shape of an elegant marble pleasure boat and told how Cixi spent funds destined for the imperial navy on such extravagant fripperies – which ultimately led to Japan's victory over China in 1895 and the loss of Taiwan".

This was perhaps because Cixi took the initiative and invited several women to spend time with her in the Forbidden City. Katharine Carl, an American painter, was called to China in 1903 to paint Cixi's portrait for the St. Louis Exposition. In her With the Empress Dowager, Carl portrays Cixi as a kind and considerate woman for her station. Cixi had great presence, charm, and graceful movements resulting in "an unusually attractive personality". Carl wrote of the empress dowager's love of dogs and of flowers, as well as boating, Chinese opera and her Chinese water pipes and European cigarettes. Cixi also commissioned the portraitist Hubert Vos to produce a series of oil portraits.

The publication of China Under The Empress Dowager (1910) by J. O. P. Bland and Edmund Backhouse contributed to Cixi's reputation with its back-door gossip, much of which came from palace eunuchs. Their portrait included contradictory elements, writes one recent study, "on the one hand... imperious, manipulative, and lascivious" and on the other "ingenuous, politically shrewd, and conscientious..." Backhouse and Bland told their readers that "to summarize her essence simply, she a woman and an Oriental". Backhouse was later found to have forged much of the source material used in this work. The vivid writing and lascivious details of their account provided material for many of the books over the following decades, including Chinese fiction and histories that drew on a 1914 translation.

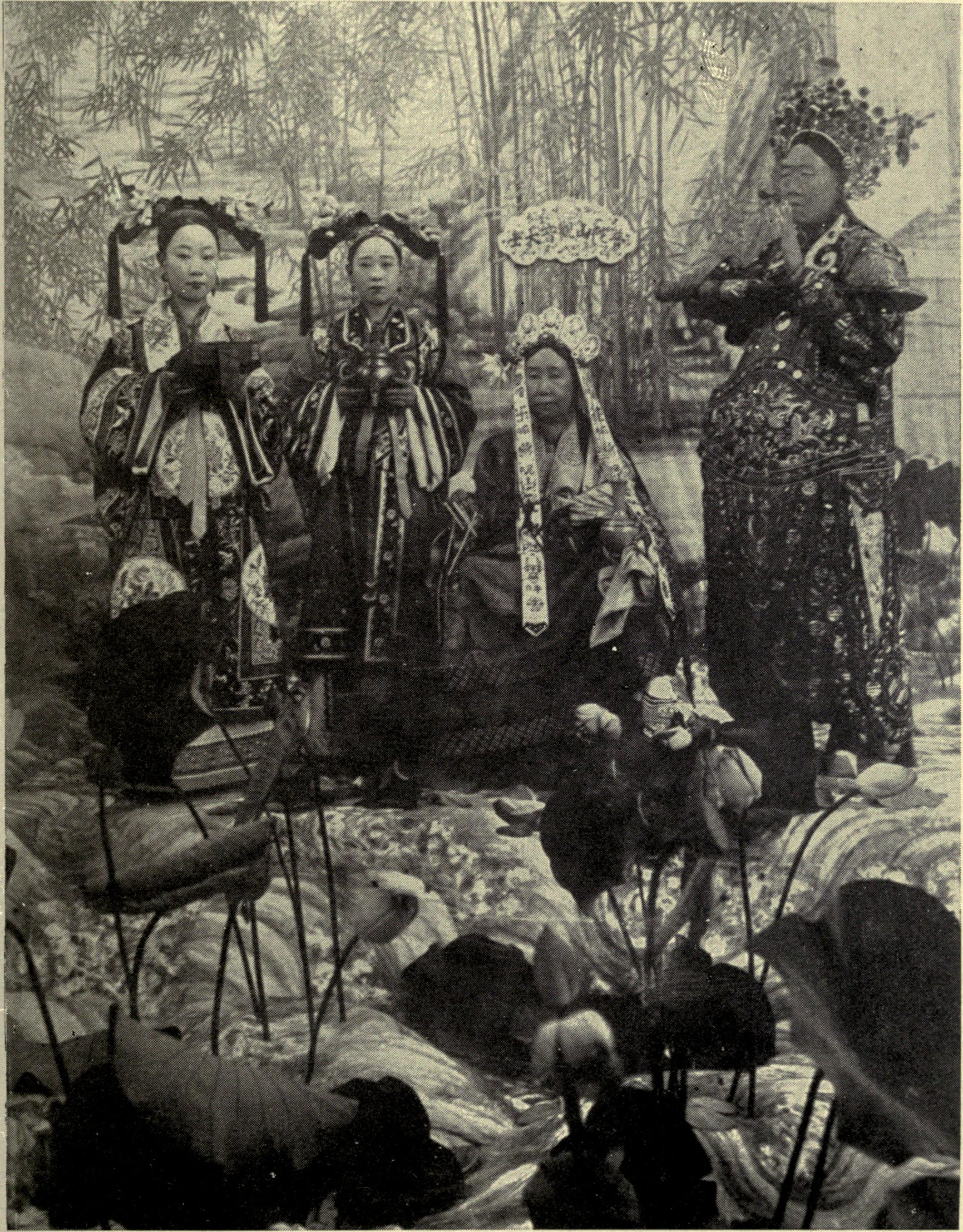
Cixi, a devoted Buddhist, developed an unusual vain form of amusement in later-life of cosplaying as Guanyin, the bodhisattva of mercy and requiring selected court officials to dress-up also, as Buddhist and Chinese celestials, and to address her as if such. This photograph depicts her upon on a barge at Zhonghai. The white smoke forms the character for longevity, and on top of the smoke was her Buddhist name "Guangrenzi" (literally Universal Benevolence).

In the People's Republic after 1949, the image of the Manchu Empress was debated and changed several times. She was sometimes praised for her anti-imperialist role in the Boxer Uprising and sometimes she was reviled as a member of the "feudalist regime". When Mao Zedong's wife, Jiang Qing, was arrested in 1976 for abuse of power, an exhibit at the Palace Museum put Cixi's luxurious goods on display to show that a female ruler weakened the nation.

By the mid-1970s, views among scholars began to change. Sue Fawn Chung's doctoral dissertation at University of California, Berkeley, was the first study in English to use court documents rather than popular histories and hearsay. Despite this, writers such as Jung Chang have criticized this narrative and have written works such as Chang's Empress Dowager Cixi: The Concubine Who Launched Modern China in order to offer an opposing view.

Several widely read popular biographies appeared. Sterling Seagrave's Dragon Lady: The Life and Legend of the Last Empress of China portrays Cixi as a woman stuck between the xenophobic faction of Manchu nobility and more moderate influences.

In 2013, Jung Chang's biography, Empress Dowager Cixi: The Concubine Who Launched Modern China, portrays Cixi as the most capable ruler and administrator that China could have had at the time. Pamela Kyle Crossley said in the London Review of Books that Chang's claims "seem to be minted from her own musings, and have little to do with what we know was actually going in China". Although Crossley was sympathetic to restoring women's place in Chinese history, she found "rewriting Cixi as Catherine the Great or Margaret Thatcher is a poor bargain: the gain of an illusory icon at the expense of historical sense".

Photographic Legacy

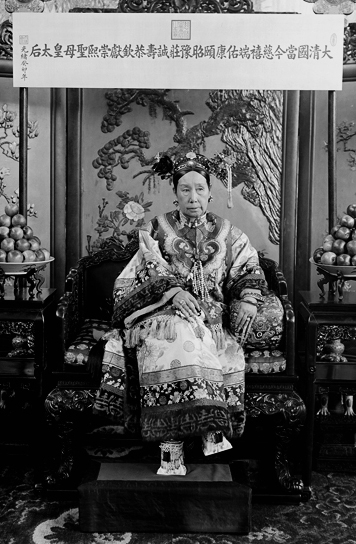
Cropped portrait of Empress Cixi

Aside from traditional portraiture, Empress Cixi also commissioned several photographs from 1903 to 1904, taken by Yu Xunling (the son of the French ambassador). The imperial portraits were very reminiscent of traditional portrait methods and feature the empress in a seated pose looking directly into the camera. They were part of her campaign to regain some authority after her reputation had been damaged by her support of the Boxer Rebellion. The portraits therefore showed the Dowager Empress seated on her throne or in other official settings. She was also very conscientious of the symbols which appeared in her portraits. Dragons do not appear, as they are symbols of the emperor, but Cixi is surrounded by peacocks and phoenixes, symbolic of the dowager empress.

Empress Cixi was also very conscientious of who would see these photographs, because there were very specific standards set by Confucianism and propriety was very important. The portrait Empress Cixi sent to President Theodore Roosevelt, which is in the Blaire House was cropped so that the spittoon in the image was cut out. The spittoon was a reference to domesticity which would have been unbecoming to send to the president. She also began showing these portraits to a wider audience, but viewers had to be at least of a certain status to view it, and the general public was still barred from seeing these images.

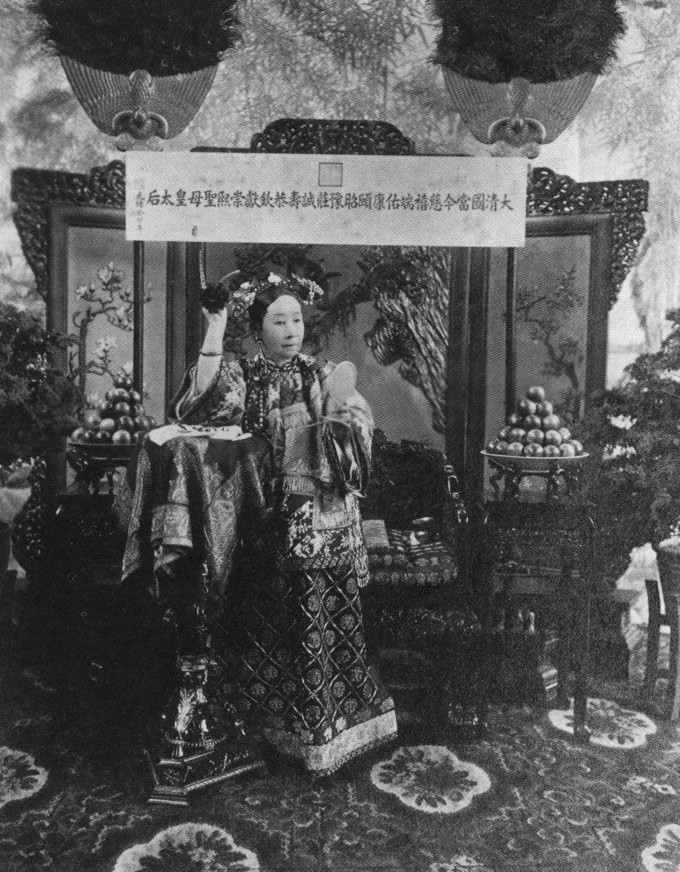
Empress Cixi posing with a mirror, 1903–1904.

Not only did Empress Cixi commission official portraits, she also had unofficial portraits taken. These unofficial portraits emphasize her femininity and establish her informal relationship with the camera and public perception. She uses poses that would have traditionally been considered unbecoming, specifically looking into the mirror and crossing her legs. The first pose, looking into a mirror, is used in portraits of her alone as well as in group settings, and was unconventional because of its association with the toilette and privacy. Looking into a mirror also challenged Confucian standards of femininity, as traditionally a woman should only use a mirror if it was to make herself beautiful for her husband, otherwise she would be considered vain. This connotation had been weakening throughout the Qing dynasty, and the mirror eventually became a symbol of female agency. Empress Cixi using a mirror, therefore, asserts her role not only as the Empress and ruler, but also of a woman. The second pose, crossing the legs, was equally controversial because crossed legs were often associated with erotic imagery and would not have been fitting for a woman of her social standing. But since she was a powerful figure and nearly 70, this perception was unconcerning and she used the position to assert her power.

== Titles, styles and honours ==
Styles of Empress Dowager Cixi
- Reference style: Her Imperial Majesty
- Spoken style: Your Imperial Majesty
- Alternative style: Empress Mother

Cixi in 1900. The plaque above her shows her title in full.

Cixi was styled as "Her Imperial Highness, Noble Consort Yi" before the accession of her Son, the Tongzhi Emperor. And after that, she was styled as "Her Imperial Majesty, The Empress Mother (simplified Chinese: 圣母皇太后; traditional Chinese: 聖母皇太后) of China", and later when the Tongzhi Emperor died, and the Guangxu Emperor succeeded, "Her Imperial Majesty, The Empress Dowager of China", then after the Guangxu Emperor died and the Xuantong Emperor succeeded, "Her Imperial Majesty, The Grand Empress Dowager (Chinese: 太皇太后)", the last title only lasted one day before her death.

=== Honours ===
- Dame Grand Cordon of the Order of the Precious Crown (Japan).
- Dame Grand Cross of the Order of Saint Catherine (Russia, 28 May 1897)

== Family ==
- Father: Yehenara Huizheng (惠徵; 1805–1853)
  - Paternal grandfather: Jingrui (景瑞)
  - Paternal grandmother: Lady Gūwalgiya
- Mother: Lady Fuca
  - Maternal grandfather: Huixian (惠顯)
- Three younger brothers
  - Second younger brother: Guixiang (桂祥; 1849–1913), served as first rank military official (都統), and held the title of a third class duke (三等公), the father of Jingfen, Empress Xiaodingjing (1868–1913)
- One younger sister
  - Second younger sister: Wanzhen (1841–1896), the mother of the Guangxu Emperor (1871–1908)

=== Issue ===
- As Concubine Yi:
  - Zaichun (載淳; 27 April 1856 – 12 January 1875), the Xianfeng Emperor's first son, enthroned on 11 November 1861 as the Tongzhi Emperor

== In popular culture ==
=== Fiction ===
- Cixi (first called Orchid, later Tzu Hsi) and her favorite eunuch are the main characters in the historical novel Lotus Blossom published in 1939 by George Lancing (pseudonym of the British author Matilda Angela Antonia Hunter).
- Flora Robson portrays the empress 'Tzu Hsi' in the 1963 Nicholas Ray's American epic historical film 55 Days at Peking; this film (based on a book by Noel Gerson) dramatizes the siege of the foreign legations' compounds in Beijing during the Boxer Rebellion.
- Der Ling's story The True Story of the Empress Dowager (originally published as Old Buddha) gives a portrayal of the history behind the character of the Empress-Dowager, not as the monster of depravity depicted in the popular press, but an aging woman who loved beautiful things and had many regrets about the past.
- Pearl S. Buck's novel Imperial Woman chronicles the life of the Empress Dowager from the time of her selection as a concubine until near to her death.
- Bette Bao Lord's novel Spring Moon starts in the days of Cixi, and includes the involvement of the Imperial Court in the Boxer Rebellion.
- The novels Empress Orchid (2004) and The Last Empress (2007), by Anchee Min portray the life of Empress Dowager Cixi from a first-person perspective.
- The Noble Consort Yi is featured in George McDonald Fraser's novel, Flashman and the Dragon (1985).
- The 1968 novel Wij Tz'e Hsi Keizerin Van China ("We, Tz'e Hsi, Empress of China") by Dutch author Johan Fabricius is a fictional diary of the Empress.
- Cixi is a character in the novel The Ginger Tree, by Oswald Wynd (1977).
- Cixi is a major character in the novel Mandarin, by American author Robert Elegant. The novel is set in the 1850s through the 1870s.
- The novel The Pleiades, by Japanese author Jirō Asada, focuses on Empress Cixi's relationship with a court eunuch named Chun'er, and depicted Cixi as a ruthless and calculating leader. It was adapted into a 2010 Japanese television series that was also broadcast in China, and starred Japanese actress Yūko Tanaka as Empress Cixi.

=== TV and films ===
Cixi was traditionally portrayed in Chinese television and film as a reactionary, profligate despot who bore primary responsibility for the Qing dynasty's downfall, particularly within Communist revolutionary narratives in mainland China. Since the China Central Television (CCTV) historical drama Towards the Republic (2003), which was banned in China upon its premiere, her portrayal in Chinese popular culture has become increasingly nuanced. Below are her notable portrayals in TV and films:

- Cixi was portrayed by Ping-Yu Chang in Qing Palace Residual Dream (1970), the first color television drama produced in Taiwan.
- In the 1970s, Cixi was portrayed by Lisa Lu in two Hong Kong-made films, The Empress Dowager (set during the Sino-Japanese War), and its sequel, The Last Tempest (set during the "Hundred Days of Reform"). Lu reprised her role as Cixi in the 1987 film The Last Emperor, depicting the dowager on her deathbed.
- Portrayed by Beulah Quo in the PBS TV series Meeting of Minds in the 1970s.
- Portrayed by Hui-fen Huang in the Hong Kong TV series Story of Tsing (1975), one of the earliest TVB productions.
- In the 1980s, Cixi was portrayed by Liu Xiaoqing, in Burning of Imperial Palace (depicting her rise to power in the 1850s), in Reign Behind a Curtain (depicting the Xinyou Coup of 1861), in The Empress Dowager (set during the latter part of the reign of Tongzhi), and in Li Lianying, the Imperial Eunuch.
- Cixi is the primary antagonist and recurring character, though only ever named as "the Empress Dowager" in the 1991 animated show The Twins of Destiny by French writer and producer Jean Chalopin.
- Portrayed by Chingmy Yau in the Hong Kong film Lover of the Last Empress (1994).
- The CCTV historical drama Towards the Republic (2003) portrayed Cixi as a conservative but capable ruler, marking the first time mainland Chinese television presented her in a nuanced portrayal politically. Following its initial broadcast, the series was taken off the air by the Central Propaganda Department. Some suggested that the suspension was linked to perceptions that the drama's depiction of a conservative Cixi and a reform-minded but politically weak Guangxu Emperor was an allegorical reflection of power dynamics between Jiang Zemin and Hu Jintao.
- Portrayed by Michelle Yim in The Rise and Fall of Qing Dynasty (1990) and The Confidant (2012).
- Portrayed by Susanna Au-yeung in The Rise and Fall of Qing Dynasty (1992).
- Portrayed by Lü Zhong in Princess Der Ling (2006).
- Portrayed by Law Lan in The Last Healer in Forbidden City (2016).
- Portrayed by Xi Meijuan in Nothing Gold Can Stay (2017).
- Portrayed by Rosina Lam in Legend of the Magnate (2025), based on the novel of the same name by Zhao Zhiyu.

== See also ==
- Imperial Chinese harem system
- Imperial and noble ranks of the Qing dynasty
- Imperial decree of declaration of war against foreign powers
- Imperial decree on events leading to the signing of Boxer Protocol
- Wu Zetian
- Kösem Sultan
- Ranavalona I

== Notes ==
=== Sources ===
- Bland, J. O. P.; Backhouse, Edmund (1910). China under the Empress Dowager: Being the History of the Life and Times of Tz*U Hsi, Compiled from State Papers and the Private Diary of the Comptroller of Her Household. London: W. Heinemann. Long the standard source until the so-called "Diary of Ching Shan" was exposed as a forgery and Backhouse as a "fraudster". Free online Googlebook here.
- Chan, Ying-kit (2015). "A Precious Mirror for Governing the Peace: A Primer for Empress Dowager Cixi". NAN NÜ. 17 (2). Brill: 214–244. doi:10.1163/15685268-00172p02.
- Chang, Jung (2013). Empress Dowager Cixi: the concubine who launched modern China (First American ed.). New York: Alfred A. Knopf. ISBN 978-0-307-45670-0.
- Chung, Sue Fawn (1979). "The Much Maligned Empress Dowager: A Revisionist Study of the Empress Dowager Tz'u-Hsi (1835–1908)". Modern Asian Studies. 13 (2): 177–196. doi:10.1017/s0026749x00008283. S2CID 144621086. Draws from the author's never published doctoral dissertation at University of California, Berkeley.
- Crossley, Pamela (2014). "In the Hornet's Nest". London Review of Books. 36 (8). Free access copy here.
- Kwong, Luke S. K. (1984). A Mosaic of the Hundred Days: Personalities, Politics, and Ideas of 1898. Cambridge, MA: Council on East Asian Studies Distributed by Harvard University Press. ISBN 0-674-58742-1.
- Laidler, Keith (2003). The last empress: the She-Dragon of China. Chichester: Wiley. ISBN 0-470-84881-2.
- Li, Yuhang; Zurndorfer, Harriet T. (2012). "Rethinking Empress Dowager Cixi through the Production of Art". NAN NÜ. 14 (1). Brill: 1–20. doi:10.1163/156853212X651960.
- Seagrave, Sterling (1992). Dragon Lady: The Life and Legend of the Last Empress of China. Vintage Books. ISBN 0-679-73369-8. Popular biography using English-language sources.
- Wang, Cheng-hua (2012). ""Going Public": Portraits of the Empress Dowager Cixi, Circa 1904". NAN NÜ. 14 (1): 119–176. doi:10.1163/156853212x652004.

Chinese royalty
Preceded by Empress Dowager Kangci	Empress Dowager of China; 1861–1908 concurrently with Empress Dowager Ci'an: 1861–1881	Succeeded by Empress Dowager Longyu
