= The Rise and Fall of Qing Dynasty =

Hong Kong television series (1987–1992)

- Genre: Historical drama
- Written by: Hui Man-ho; Cheuk Yat-choi; Lee Ngoi-kwan; Ng Siu-tung; Tam Kam-wah; Lee Tze-hing; Wan Hak-kei; Yau Fuk-hing; Tang Ming-lan
- Directed by: Yeung Ho-wan; Wong Wai-yip; Hui Mei-kwan; Lui Sui-lun; Chu Yik-lung; Kwong Yip-sang; Keung Ming-hoi; Chow Wah-yu; Lo Ting; Cheung Kin-wai; Wu King-wai; Leung Yan-chuen; Yuen Wai-yee; Ng Yiu-kuen; Wong Chun-man; Yeung Chi-kin; Mak Tin-bong; Ng Chi-kuen
- Starring: Wong Wai; Pat Poon; Lee Ching-san; Jason Pai; Wai Lit; Wong Yuen-sun; Wong Yue; Lo Chun-shun; Leung Si-ho; Kent Tong; Yim Chau-wah
- Theme music composer: Kwan Sing-yau; Tsui Yat-kan
- Country of origin: Hong Kong
- Original language: Cantonese
- No. of seasons: 4
- No. of episodes: 68 (Season 1); 50 (Season 2); 20 (Season 3); 24 (Season 4)

Production
- Producers: Yeung Kam-chuen; Chow Wah-yu; Lung Siu-kei
- Production location: Hong Kong
- Running time: 45 minutes per episode
- Production company: ATV

Original release
- Network: ATV Home
- Release: September 7, 1987 – May 22, 1992

The Rise and Fall of Qing Dynasty
- Traditional Chinese: 滿清十三皇朝
- Simplified Chinese: 满清十三皇朝
- Literal meaning: The Thirteen Manchu Qing Dynasties
Transcriptions
Standard Mandarin
- Hanyu Pinyin: Mǎnqīng Shísān Huángcháo
Yue: Cantonese
- Jyutping: Mun5 Ching1 Sap6 Saam1 Wong4 Chiu4

The Rise and Fall of Qing Dynasty (Chinese: 滿清十三皇朝) is a long-running four part television series about the history of the Qing dynasty. The series was produced by Hong Kong's ATV and was aired on ATV Home from September 1987 to May 1992.

== Five seasons ==
=== Season 1 ===
- Title: 滿清十三皇朝; literally: The Thirteen Manchu Qing Dynasties
- Covers the reigns of Nurhaci, Hong Taiji, Shunzhi Emperor and Kangxi Emperor
- 68 episodes
- Airing period: September 7 - December 11, 1987

=== Season 2 ===
- Title: 滿清十三皇朝2; literally: The Thirteen Manchu Qing Dynasties 2
- Covers the reigns of the Yongzheng Emperor, Qianlong Emperor, Jiaqing Emperor and Daoguang Emperor
- 50 episodes
- Airing period: June 29 - September 7, 1988

=== Season 3 ===
- Title: 血染紫禁城; Bloodshed Over the Forbidden Palace
- Covers the reigns of the Xianfeng Emperor and Tongzhi Emperor
- 20 episodes
- Airing period: April 5 - September 20, 1990

=== Season 4 ===
- Title: 危城爭霸 / 皇城爭霸; Battle in the Dangerous City / Battle for the Imperial City
- Covers the reigns of the Guangxu Emperor and Xuantong Emperor
- 24 episodes (this season was edited down to 20 episodes when it aired in Hong Kong)
- Airing period: April 27 - May 22, 1992 (this season was produced in 1990, but it was not aired in Hong Kong until 1992)

== Plot ==
The series covered the history of the Qing dynasty during the reigns of its twelve emperors. It started from its early origins as the Later Jin dynasty, founded by Nurhaci in 1616, until its eventual collapse when the last ruler Puyi abdicated in 1912.

== Cast ==
=== Part 1 ===
==== Tianming ====
- Wong Wai as Nurhaci
- Law Shek-ching as Šurhaci
- Jaclyn Chu as Lady Tunggiya
- Liu Yuet-yin as Litai
- Pau Hon-lam as Giocangga
- Leung Kam-san as Taksi
- Fung Tsan as Lady Nara
- Cheng Lui as Nikan Wailan
- Cheung Tsang as Li Chengliang
- Lo Kwok-fai as Li Rubai
- Mak Tsui-han as Monggo
  - Yip Ka-man as Monggo (young)
- Kok Chun-kei as Samugu
- Szema Wah Lung as Bamuni
- Siu San-yan as Longdun
- Tam Wing-kit as Sangguli
- Kam San as Anfeiyanggu
- Choi Kwok-hing as Eyidu
- Chan Leung as E'er Guoni
- Ngo Lung as Yangjienu
- Sit Chun-kei as Qingjienu
- Lau Siu-hung as Gehashan
- Lee Hung as Nuomina
- Tsang Tsan-on as Atu
- Ho Shu-pui as Changshu
- Lee Sam as Yangshu
- Lo Fan as Yuelun
- Lee Shau-kei as Suo'erguo
- Ng Wing-sam as Gongzhenglu
- Cheung Chun-wah as Manggūltai
- Ben Ng as Amin
- Poon Yau-shing as Heheli
- Ling Man-hoi as Buzhantai
- Cheng Shu-fung as Jintaiji
- Lee Hon-sing as Buqi
- Tong Kam-tong as Nalan Bulu
- Ho Tim as Sun Gui
- Tsau Wai-kwong as Tu'erge
- Yau Tin-lung as Cuyen
- Kwan Wai-lun as Daišan
- Kwan Tze-biu as Fiongdon
- Yip Yuk-ping as Mukushi
- Eva Lai as Lady Abahai
- Ng Si-tak as Hu'erhan
- Pat Poon as Hong Taiji
- Ting Leung as Xiong Tingbi
- Chan Siu-lung as Yuan Chonghuan
- Lau Suk-fong as Ajigen
- Tsang Mei-ling as Deyinze

==== Tiancong, Chongde ====
- Pat Poon as Hong Taiji
- Nora Miao as Consort Zhuang
- Kwan Wai-lun as Daišan
- Eva Lai as Lady Abahai
- Ben Ng as Amin
- Cheung Chun-wah as Manggūltai
- Ling Fei-lik as Jirgalang
- Lee Tze-kei as Abatai
- Ken Lok as Ajige
- Law Lok-lam as Dorgon
- Wong Chi-ning as Dodo
- Yeung Tak-si as Hooge
- Chan Lai-yau as Yoto
- Chan Siu-lung as Yuan Chonghuan
- Leung Hon-wai as Fan Wencheng
- Lee Siu-ling as Fan Wencheng's wife
- Tam Tak-sing as Shuotuo
- Tsau Wai-kwong as Tu'erge
- Sin Po-ming as Dudu
- Cheung Kam as Lengsengji
- Yau Tai-pang as Degelei
- Fan Wing-wah as Mao Wenlong
- Cheung Ping-tsan as Zu Dashou
- Zero Chou as Sumalagu
- Kwan Suet-lai as concubine
- Mang Lai-ping as Empress
- Kwan Wan-ting as concubine
- Yuen Yi-ling as Harjol
- Liu Yuet-yin as Li Lama
- Lau Tsung-kei as the Chongzhen Emperor
- Ho Tim as Yang Chun
- Chan Choi-yin as Mangguji
- Tang Tak-kwong as Shang Kexi
- Leung Ming as Sonin
- Fong Kit as Hong Chengchou

==== Shunzhi ====
- Lee Ching-san as the Shunzhi Emperor
- Nora Miao as Empress Dowager Xiaozhuang
- Kwan Wai-lun as Daišan
- Law Lok-lam as Dorgon
- Ling Fei-lik as Jirgalang
- Leung Ming as Sonin
- Zero Chou as Sumalagu
- Chan Leung as Oboi
- Hung Tak-sing as Wu Sangui
- Wong Lai-ying as Chen Yuanyuan
- Lee Hang as Tian Chou
- Sin Kwai-chi as Consort Tunggiya
- Lee Ying-tong as Empress
- Yeung Chung-yan as Mao Xiang
- Ng Ning as Consort Donggo
- Hon Kong as Wang Linxiu
- Tong Pan-cheung as Mao Xisen
- Tsui Yau-pang as Wu Meicun
- Diego Swing as Johann Adam Schall von Bell
- Tong Chi-wing as Wu Liangfu
- Leung Kam-san as Ebilun

==== Kangxi ====
- Jason Pai
  - Chan Chun-nin as the Kangxi Emperor (young)
- Nora Miao as Empress Dowager Xiaozhuang
- Leung Ming as Sonin
- Leung Kam-san as Ebilun
- Chan Leung as Oboi
- Cheung Hung-cheung as Songgotu
- Ma Po-chun as Consort Liang
- Szema Wah Lung as Wei Hui
- Tsau Wai-kwong as Wu You
- Ngo Lung as Mingju
- Lau Chn as Jishi
- Fan Wing-wah as Jieshu
- Lee Ling-kong as Nalan Xingde
- Leung Yin-ling as Lu Ziying
- Wong Lik as Mulima
- Chan Tik-wah as Empress
- Choi Yan-wah as Consort Yu
- Au Yin-lin as Consort De
- Wan Lai-yuk as Consort Rong
- Ha Chi-chan as Imperial Noble Consort
- Yu Man-ping as Jin Fu
- Lo Yiu-hung as Wu Guofan
- Tam Wing-kit as Yinzhi
- Wong Wai-leung as Yinreng
- Ng Si-tak as Yinzhi
- Wai Lit as Yinzhen
- Eric Wan as Yinsi
- Tam Tak-sing as Yintang
- Cho Yuen-tat as Yin'e
- Cheung Wai as Yinti
- Hon Kong as Maqi
- Ling Man-hoi as Nian Gengyao
- Lok Wai-ching as Nian Cuiwei
- Kwan Tze-biu as Longkodo
- Poon Yau-shing as E'ling'e
- Chan Tung as Suksaha
- Hung Tak-sing as Wu Sangui
- Wong Lai-ying as Chen Yuanyuan
- Fong Kit as Hong Chengchou
- Leung Hon-wai as Fan Wencheng
- Diego Swing as Johann Adam Schall von Bell

=== Part 2 ===
==== Yongzheng ====
- Wai Lit as the Yongzheng Emperor
- Tang Tak-kwong as Yunxiang
- Eric Wan as Yunsi
- Cheung Wai as Yinti
- Chan Tsik-wai as Yunlu
- Tam Tak-sing as Yintang
- Ling Man-hoi as Nian Gengyao
- Kwan Tze-biu as Longkodo
- Yu Man-ping as Monk Wenjue
- Fan Wing-wah as Yue Zhongqi
- Cheng Shu-fung as Bai Taiguan
- Kwan Wai-lun as Zhang Tingyu
- Chan Choi-yin as Consort Xi
- Au Yin-lin as Consort De
- Lok Wai-ching as Consort Nian
- Ng Wui as Wang Bin
- Hon Kong as Maqi
- Tang Chi-sing as Cai Huaixi
- Fung Chi-wing as Wang Zhaoping
- Ho Tim as Li Siting
- Tsau Wai-kwong as Zeng Jing
- Wing Biu as Zhang Xi
- Ng Wing-sam as Lü Baozhong
- Yip Yuk-ping as Lü Siniang
- Cheung Ping-tsan as Qiurangong
- Chan Siu-lung as Ertai
- Keung Hon-man as Gan Fengchi
- Pau Hon-lam as Chen Shiguan
- Wong Tso-wing as Zhang Guangsi
- Berg Ng as Zhu Rongjing
- Fok Wing-fuk as Hongshi
- Wong Yuen-sun as Hongli
- Ling Fei-lik as Hongzhou
- Chow Sau-lan as Sun Furu
- Hung Tak-sing as Fuheng

==== Qianlong ====
- Wong Yuen-sun as the Qianlong Emperor
- Chan Fuk-sang as Lady Fuca
- Tsui Si-fei as Consort Lan
- Tsui Yau-pang as Yunzhe
- Lin Lang as Liang'erji
- Lau Chun as Shaluoben
- Cheung Chun-wah as Heshen
- Yau Tai-pang as Yu Minzhong
- Poon Yau-shing as Liu Tongxun
- Au Oi-ling as Consort Qing
- Ken Lok as Zhou Riqing
- Chan Hiu-ying as Fragrant Concubine
- Chan Tik-wah as Consort Ling
- Lau Tsung-kei as Hongxiao
- Szema Wah Lung as Dazhuomu
- Tsau Wai-kwong as Xiaozhuomu
- Chan Leung as Sule Tansha
- Wong Siu-pang as Ji Yun
- Wong Yue as Yongyan
- Lau Wan-fung as Yongxin
- Cheung Tsang as Liu Yong
- Siu San-yan as Gong'ela
- Ng Tsi-yin as Hexiao
- Lau Siu-kwan as Fuk'anggan
- Wong Hoi-tung as Fengshen Yinde
- Poon Sin-yi as Lady Niuhuru
- Yuen Yi-ling as Lady Hitara
- Wong Ching-ho as Qinggui

==== Jiaqing ====
- Wong Yue as the Jiaqing Emperor
- Wong Yuen-sun as the Qianlong Emperor
- Poon Sin-yi as Consort Shun
- Lau Siu-kwan as Fuk'anggan
- Lau Tsung-kei as Fuchang'an
- Cheung Chun-wah as Heshen
- Yuen Yi-ling as Lady Hitara
- Siu San-yan as Gong'ela
- Szema Wah Lung as Zhu Gui
- Tong Kam-tong as Yang Fang
- Chan Leung as Yang Yuchun
- Lau Wan-fung as Yongxin
- Poon Bing-seung as Jiulan
- Kong To as Cao Zhenyong
- Lo Chun-shun as Mianning
- Yeung Chung-yan as Miankai
- Li Ling-kong as Mianxin
- Wong Man-ching as Lady Tunggiya
- Lee Shau-kei as Saichong'e
- Sin Kwai-chi as Lady Dong

==== Daoguang ====
- Lo Chun-shun as the Daoguang Emperor
- Wong Man-ching as Consort Shen
- Kong To as Cao Zhenyong
- Yeung Chung-yan as Miankai
- Choi Sin-yu as Consort Quan
- Kingdom Yuen as Consort Xiang
- Wan Suet-kei as Consort Jing
- Choi Kwok-hing as Mujangga
- Lee Hin-ming as Mianke
- Kong Man-shing as Lin Zexu
- Yuen Ling-to as Chen Fu'en
- Kam San as Qishan
- Luk Man-chun as Guan Tianpei
- Wong Yiu-kwong as Deng Tingzhen
- Chan Siu-lung as Du Shoutian
- Chan Kwok-kwong as Yizhu
- Wong Chi-ning as Yicong
- Lo Yiu-hung as Yixin

=== Part 3 (Xianfeng and Tongzhi) ===
- Lee Ching-san as the Xianfeng Emperor
- Michelle Yim as Lady Lan
- Tony Liu as Prince Gong
- Sam-sam as Consort Zhen
- Mak Lai-hung as Consort Li
- Fung So-bor as Empress Xiaojing
- Cheng Shu-fung as Yicong
- Yeung Chak-lam as Sushun
- Szema Wah Lung as Baijun
- Lee Ling-kong as An Dehai
- Cheung Tsang as Gui Liang
- Ng Wing-sam as Prince Zheng
- Chan Tsik-wai as Prince Yi
- Tam Wing-kit as Prince Chun
- Wong Lai-ying as Cao Xiulian
- Ban Ban as Ding Xiufeng
- Savio Tsang as Ding Zhaolun
- Chow Sau-lan as Wen Caixia
- Choi Kwok-hing as Wen Gui
- Hung Tak-sing as Yao Yongzhi
- Lau Wan-fung as Shengbao
- Leung Si-ho as the Tongzhi Emperor
- Lee Ching as Lady Arute
- Chan Pui-san as Consort Hui
- Au Yin-lin as Kurun Princess
- Au-yeung Yiu-lun as Zaicheng
- Wong Hoi-ning as Fuqing
- Chan Tung as Zeng Guofan

=== Part 4 (Guangxu and Xuantong) ===
- Kent Tong as the Guangxu Emperor
- Sum Sum as Empress Dowager Ci'an
- Susanna Au-yeung as Empress Dowager Cixi
- Suet Lei as Empress Longyu
- Jaime Chik as Consort Zhen
- Ching Lan as Consort Jin
- Hung Tak-sing as Ronglu
- Lo Ching-ho as Li Lianying
- Lam Si-chung as Kurun Princess
- Cheung Tsang as Prince Gong
- Kong Hon as Weng Tonghe
- Ho Shu-san as Kou Liancai
- Kwan Wai-lun as Yixuan (Prince Chun)
- Leung Suk-chong as Princess Consort Chun
- Ling Man-hoi as Li Hongzhang
- Yeung Ka-nok as Kang Youwei
- Tang Tak-kwong as Tan Sitong
- Lee Kong as Liang Qichao
- Yuen Ling-to as Prince Qing
- Wai Lit as Yuan Shikai
- Kong To as Prince Duan
- Lung Ping-kei as Pujun
- Ling Fei-lik as Cui Yugui
- Lo Chun-shun as Zaifeng (Prince Chun)
- Choi Sin-yu as Sixth Princess
- Yim Chau-wah as Puyi
- Lo Tsung-wah as Pujie
- Lau Wan-fung as Zhang Xun
- Tam Tak-sing as Zhang Qinghe
- Leung Kam-san as Eunuch Yuan
- Yip Yuk-ping as Empress Wanrong
- Lau Kam-ling as Wenxiu
- Simon Chui as Zheng Xiaoxu
- Cheng Shu-fung as Lu Zhonglin
- Paul Fonoroff as Reginald Johnston

== Theme songs ==
- Part 1: performed by Chiu San
- Part 2 (Yongzheng and Qianlong): performed by Lo Chun-shun, Chan Fuk-sang, Lee Chun-hung and Keung Pui-lei
- Part 2 (Jiaqing and Daoguang): performed by Lo Chun-shun and Keung Pui-lei
- Part 3: performed by Chiu San
- Part 4: performed by Jaime Chik

== Re-airing ==
The series was re-aired on ATV Home in Hong Kong between October 3 and December 28, 2006.
