= Bordered Blue Banner =

- Flag of the Bordered Blue Banner
- Active: 1615–1912
- Country: Later Jin; Qing dynasty
- Type: Cavalry; Musketeers
- Part of: Eight Banners
- Commander: Amin; The Emperor

Chinese name
- Traditional Chinese: 鑲藍旗
- Simplified Chinese: 镶蓝旗
Transcriptions
Standard Mandarin
- Hanyu Pinyin: xiānglánqí

Mongolian name
- Mongolian Cyrillic: Хөвөөт хөх хошуу

Manchu name
- Manchu script: ᡴᡠᠪᡠᡥᡝ ᠯᠠᠮᡠᠨ ᡤᡡᠰᠠ
- Romanization: kubuhe lamun gūsa

The Bordered Blue Banner (Chinese: 镶蓝旗) was one of the Eight Banners of Manchu military and society during the Later Jin and Qing dynasty of China. It was one of the lower five banners. According to the general annals of the Eight Banners, the Bordered Blue Banner was one of the banners located on the south right wing (blue banners were located southward, the Plain Blue Banner being on the south left wing).

This banner was first commanded by Amin (second of the Four Senior Beile), the eldest son of Šurhaci, and then transferred to his younger brother Jirgalang. After Amin lost favor with Hong Taiji, the Bordered Blue Banner was assigned to Jirgalang. By the bloodline of its commanders, the Bordered Blue Banner was the most remote of the Eight Banners as all the other banners were led by descendants of Nurhaci, and was usually seen as the last of the Eight Banners although there were no concrete laws to officially acknowledge this status.

Some Haixi Jurchens were incorporated into this banner after the defeat of the Haixi Jurchens by the Jianzhou Jurchens.

== Notable members ==
- Anfiyanggū
- Amin
- Jirgalang
- Šarhūda
- Shang Kexi
- Empress Nara
- Noble Consort Yu
- Noble Consort Xun
- Gu Taiqing
- Duanhua
- Consort Chang
- Sushun
- Empress Dowager Cixi
- Imperial Noble Consort Xianzhe
- Imperial Noble Consort Dunhui

== Notable clans ==
- Irgen Gioro
- Sirin Gioro
- Šušu Gioro
- Hešeri
- Yehe Nara
- Gogiya
- Keliyete
- Giorca

== Bibliography ==
- Elliott, Mark C. (2001), The Manchu Way: The Eight Banners and Ethnic Identity in Late Imperial China, Stanford University Press, ISBN 9780804746847
- Wakeman Jr., Frederic (1985), The Great Enterprise: The Manchu Reconstruction of Imperial Order in Seventeenth-century China, Berkeley: University of California Press, ISBN 0520048040
