= The Burning of Imperial Palace =

1983 Chinese-Hong Kong film by Li Han-hsiang

- 火燒圓明園
- Directed by: Li Han-hsiang
- Screenplay by: Yeung Cheun-ban; Li Han-hsiang
- Produced by: Chiu Wai; Li Han-hsiang
- Starring: Liu Xiaoqing; Tony Leung Ka-fai; Hong Kwan; Chan Wah; Wong Pui
- Narrated by: Pak Wah
- Cinematography: Yeung Lam; Hau San-chun; Chiu Lok-tin
- Music by: Yip Shun Chi
- Distributed by: China Film Co-Production Corp. New Kwun Lun Film Production Co. Ltd.
- Release date: 21 September 1983 (Hong Kong)
- Running time: 86 minutes
- Countries: China; Hong Kong
- Languages: Mandarin Chinese; Cantonese
- Box office: US$26 million (est.)

The Burning of Imperial Palace (Chinese: 火燒圓明園 is a 1983 historical drama film directed by Li Han-hsiang. Based on the events in China during the Second Opium War which culminated in the burning of the Old Summer Palace (a.k.a. Yuanming Garden), the film stars Tony Leung Ka-fai as the Xianfeng Emperor and Liu Xiaoqing as a young noble consort, Cixi.

== Plot ==
In 1852, a 17-year-old girl named Yulan is selected for the Imperial Harem at a triennial selection. Although her beauty was outstanding, she was never given any chance to get closer to the Xianfeng Emperor due to the fact that an ancestor of her clan, the Yehenara clan, once vowed to destroy the rival imperial Aisin Gioro clan at a woman's hands. One day, while the Emperor is walking in the Yuanming Garden, he was attracted by a song which apparently was sung by Yulan, who was nearby. Falling in love with her temperament the Emperor first promotes Yulan to the rank of concubine and further elevates her as a noble consort when she gives birth to his only son one year later.

Since then the imperial couple had enjoyed their married life in the Yuanming Garden, where the Emperor often teaches the noble consort how to reply to reports from regional officials. When the Emperor is confronted with the advance of a joint Anglo-French force, Yulan suggests appointing Yixin, Prince Gong as a consultant. At a meeting presided over by the Emperor, Yulan and Prince Gong advocate making peace with Western powers, against the majority of the military officials. Yulan's first attempt to directly interfere with government affairs proves successful, as the Emperor accepts her proposal and orders a peace talk at Tungchow, where a heavy Qing Army is stationed.

At Tongzhou, British envoy Harry Parkes insisted the British and French delegations to make a high-profile entrance into Peking and refuses to salute the Qing Emperor with genuflection. Sengge Rinchen, who was defeated at the Battle of Taku Forts, before angrily reprimands Parkes and challenges him to a wrestling match. Sengge Rinchen beats Parkes and takes the foreign delegations into custody. As the negotiations broke down, the cavalry-dominated Qing Army suffers disastrous losses at the Battle of Palikao.

The fall of Palikao putting Peking at imminent risk, the Xianfeng Emperor has no choice but to flee to the Summer Resort in Jehol along with the imperial court and to appoint Prince Gong to be in charge of negotiations. The British and French troops entered the Chinese capital. Although Qing resistance is too weak against the firearm-equipped Western powers, a peasant family volunteers to defend the city and kills many soldiers of the joint expeditionary force. The joint army enters the now-emptied Yuanming Garden to hunt for the volunteers, disregarding the weak protest from Qing officials. On 18 October 1860, Lord Elgin orders the sacking and complete destruction of the "Palace of All Palaces" with a fire that lasts for three days. The narrator states that the ruins of Yuanming Garden serve as a reminder of "national humiliation".

== Cast ==
- Liu Xiaoqing as Yulan, Noble Consort Yi
- Tony Leung Ka-fai as the Xianfeng Emperor
- Hong Kwan as Sushun
- Chan Wah as the Empress
- Wong Pui as Duanhua, Prince Zheng of the First Rank
- Zhang Tielin as Prince Gong
- Li Yan as Sengge Rinchen
- Pang Wanning as Harry Parkes

== Box office ==
In Hong Kong, the film grossed HK$15,439,323 (US$2.13 million).

In China, the film sold 240 million tickets by 1985, equivalent to an estimated CN¥48 million (US$24 million) in gross revenue. (Note: See Box office § Average ticket price.)

In total, the film grossed an estimated US$26.1 million in Asia, equivalent to an estimated US$84 million adjusted for inflation.
