= Empress Dowager Ci'an =

Empress of China from 1852 to 1861

Empress Dowager Ci'an 慈安太后
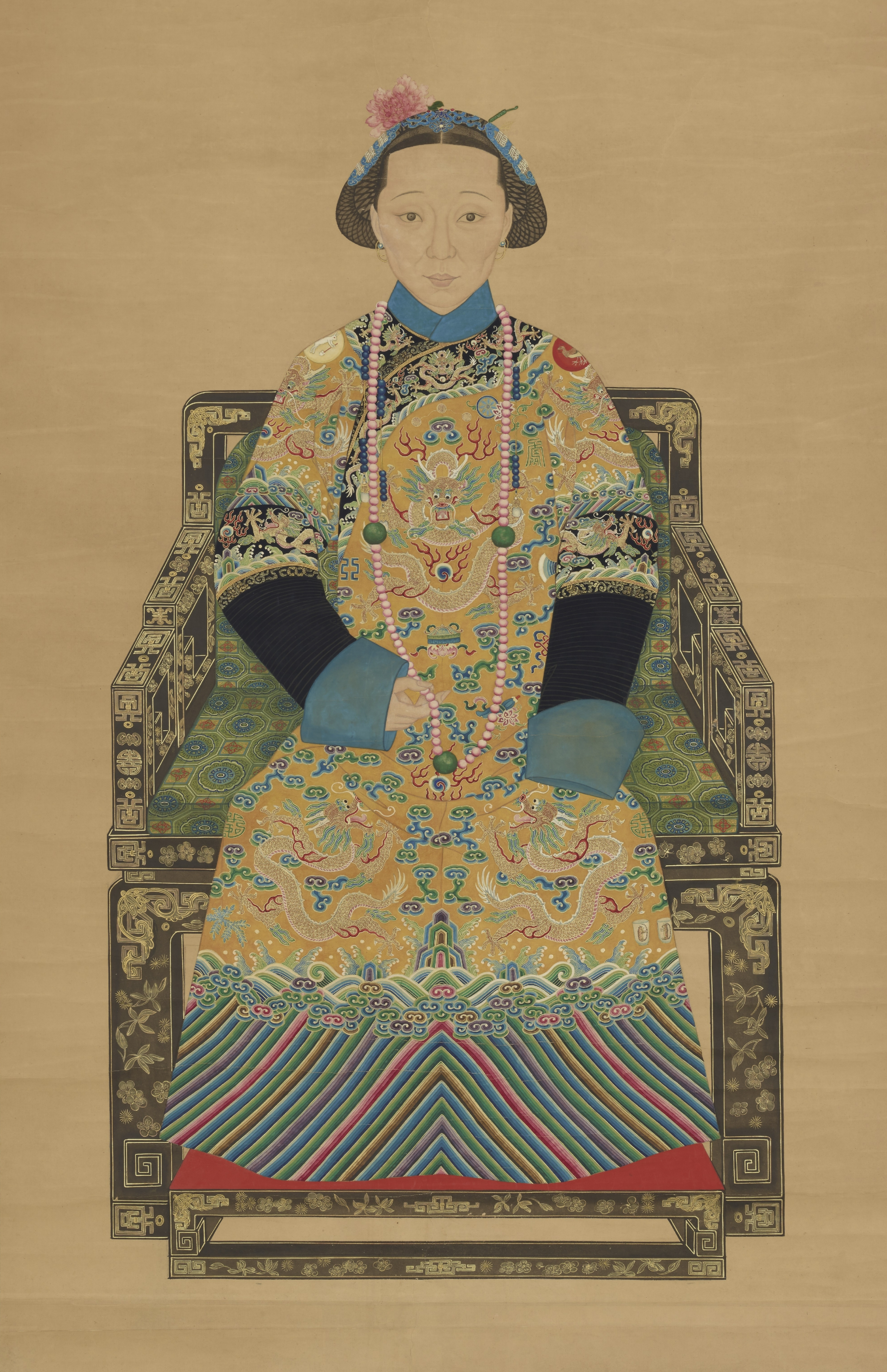

Regent of the Qing dynasty
- Regency: 11 November 1861 – 23 February 1873 (11 years, 104 days)
- Monarch: Tongzhi Emperor
- Regency: 25 February 1875 – 8 April 1881 (6 years, 42 days)
- Monarch: Guangxu Emperor

Empress consort of the Qing dynasty
- Tenure: 24 July 1852 – 22 August 1861 (9 years, 29 days)
- Predecessor: Empress Xiaoquancheng
- Successor: Empress Xiaozheyi

Empress dowager of the Qing dynasty
- Tenure: 22 August 1861 – 8 April 1881 (19 years, 229 days)
- Predecessor: Empress Dowager Kangci
- Successor: Empress Dowager Cixi
- Born: 12 August 1837 (道光十七年 七月 十二日); Liuzhou, Qing China
- Died: 8 April 1881 (aged 43) (光緒七年 三月 十日); Zhongcui Palace, Forbidden City, Beijing, Qing China
- Burial: Ding Mausoleum, Eastern Qing tombs
- Spouse: Xianfeng Emperor (m. 1852; died 1861)
Posthumous name
- Empress Xiaozhen Ci'an Yuqing Hejing Chengjing Yitian Zuosheng Xian (孝貞慈安裕慶和敬誠靖儀天祚聖顯皇后)
- House: Niohuru (鈕祜祿) (by birth); Aisin Gioro (by marriage)
- Father: Muyang'a (穆揚阿)
- Mother: Lady Giyanggiya (姜佳氏)

Empress Dowager Ci'an

Chinese name
- Traditional Chinese: 孝貞顯皇后
- Simplified Chinese: 孝贞显皇后
Transcriptions
Standard Mandarin
- Hanyu Pinyin: Xiàozhēnxiǎn Huánghòu

Manchu name
- Manchu script: ᡥᡳᠶᠣᠣᡧᡠᠩᡤᠠ ᠵᡝᡴᡩᡠᠨ ᡳᠯᡝᡨᡠ ᡥᡡᠸᠠᠩᡥᡝᠣ
- Romanization: hiyoošungga jekdun iletu hūwangheo

Empress Xiaozhenxian (12 August 1837 – 8 April 1881) was the empress consort of the Xianfeng Emperor of China's Qing dynasty from 1852 until her husband's death in 1861, after which she was honored as Empress Dowager Ci'an.

As empress dowager and one of the most senior members of the imperial family, she and Empress Dowager Cixi became co-regents during the reign of two young emperors: the Tongzhi Emperor and later the Guangxu Emperor. Although in principle, she had precedence over Cixi, Ci'an was in fact a self-effacing person and seldom intervened in politics, but she was the decision-maker in most family affairs. Instead, Empress Dowager Cixi was the decision-maker in most state affairs.

A popular view of Empress Dowager Ci'an is that she was a highly respectable person, always quiet, never hot-tempered, and that she treated everybody very well and was highly respected by the Xianfeng Emperor. However, some historians have painted a very different reality, mainly that of a self-indulgent and idle Empress Dowager Ci'an, who did not care as much for government and hard work as she cared for the pleasures and sweet life inside the Forbidden City.

== Life ==
=== Family background ===
Empress Xiaozhenxian's personal name was not recorded in history.

- Father: Muyang'a (穆揚阿), served as an official in Guangxi, and held the title of a third class duke (三等公)
  - Paternal grandfather: Fukejing'a (福克京阿)
  - Paternal grandmother: Lady Aisin Gioro
  - Paternal aunt: Lady Niohuru, Duanhua's primary consort, the maternal grandmother of Empress Xiaozheyi (1854–1875)
- Mother: Lady Giyanggiya
- One brother: Guangke
- One sister: Lady Niohuru, primary consort of Prince Zhuanghou of the first rank, Yiren

Xiaozhenxian was a descendant of Eidu, one of the top five generals who served under Nurhaci (the founder of the Qing dynasty), through Eidu's third son, Celge (車爾格).

The future empress's great-grandfather, Fukejing'a (福克精阿), served as a management official in Xining and held the title of a baron. Her grandfather, Cebutan (策布坦), served as a second-rank commander in Shanxi Province and also held the title of a baron. Her father, Muyang'a, served as an official in Guangxi Province and held the title of a third class cheng'en duke. Muyang'a's primary consort was the granddaughter of Qingheng (慶恆; d. 1779), a great-grandson of Nurhaci, but it was Lady Jiang (姜氏), a concubine of Muyang'a, who was Xiaozhenxian's birth mother. Her brother, Guangke (廣科; d. 1880), served as a general in Hangzhou. Her aunt married Duanhua (Prince Zheng), a prominent noble and close adviser of the Xianfeng Emperor.

=== Daoguang era ===
The future Empress Xiaozhenxian was born on the 12th day of the seventh lunar month in the 17th year of the reign of the Daoguang Emperor, which translates to 12 August 1837 in the Gregorian calendar.

=== Xianfeng era ===
When the Daoguang Emperor died on 15 February 1850, his fourth son, Yizhu, succeeded him and was enthroned as the Xianfeng Emperor. The Xianfeng Emperor's primary consort had died a month before the emperor's coronation and was posthumously honoured as "Empress Xiaodexian". The process of selecting a new primary consort to be the Xianfeng Emperor's empress consort, however, was delayed due to the mourning period for the Daoguang Emperor.

The auditions for the Xianfeng Emperor's consorts took place in 1851 in the Forbidden City. Lady Niohuru was among the candidates shortlisted by Dowager Consort Kangci, the highest ranked living consort of the Daoguang Emperor at the time. However, some sources claimed that Lady Niohuru entered the Forbidden City in the late 1840s and became a concubine of the Xianfeng Emperor, who was still known as the Fourth Prince then.

Lady Niohuru's status within the palace rose rapidly. On 14 June 1852, she was granted the title "Concubine Zhen" ("Zhen" meaning "upright", "chaste", "virtuous", or "faithful to the memory of one's husband", i.e., by remaining chaste after his death and not remarrying). In late June or early July 1852, she was elevated to "Noble Consort Zhen". On 24 July 1852, she was officially designated as the Empress. As Empress, she was put in charge of the emperor's harem. Some sources claim that Lady Niohuru was already designated as the Xianfeng Emperor's primary spouse after the death of her predecessor, Empress Xiaodexian.

Imperial customs required that the emperor spend one day a month with the empress. The Empress remained childless. On 27 April 1856, another of the Xianfeng Emperor's consorts, Concubine Yi (the future Empress Dowager Cixi), gave birth to the emperor's first son, Zaichun. Some biographers mentioned that the Empress gave birth to the Xianfeng Emperor's only daughter, Princess Rong'an of the First Rank, who was actually born to Concubine Li. However, as Empress, Lady Niohuru was nominally the mother of all the Xianfeng Emperor's children, regardless of whether or not she was their birth mother. Consequently, it was the Empress who raised the Xianfeng Emperor's children and decided their punishment when they did not obey her. Concubine Yi had little to say in her son's upbringing. She once recalled, "I had... quite a lot of trouble with (the Empress) and found it very difficult to keep on good terms with her."

=== Tongzhi era ===
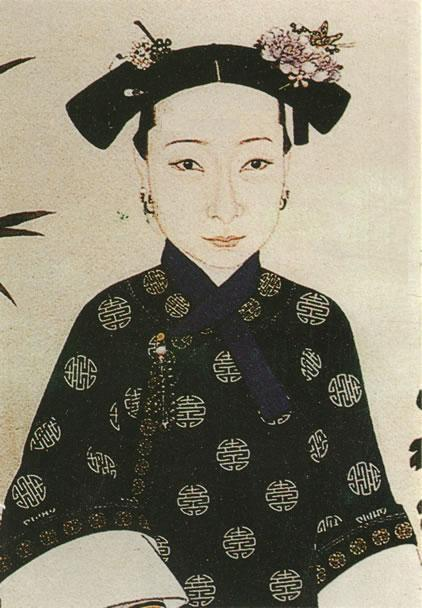
A young Empress Dowager Ci'an

On 22 August 1861, in the wake of the Second Opium War, the Xianfeng Emperor died at the Rehe Traveling Palace (熱河行宮), 230 km (140 mi) northeast of Beijing, where he and his imperial court had fled to when the Anglo-French forces closed in on the Forbidden City. He was succeeded by his sole surviving son, Zaichun, who was only five years old then; Zaichun was enthroned as the Tongzhi Emperor. A power struggle broke out between two factions over the issue of who should assume the regency until Zaichun was old enough to rule on his own. On his deathbed, the Xianfeng Emperor had appointed his close adviser Sushun and seven others to be the regents. However, Noble Consort Yi, the Tongzhi Emperor's birth mother, also wanted to assume the regency. The Empress initially agreed to cooperate with Sushun and his seven co-regents, but changed her mind after being persuaded by Noble Consort Yi. In November 1861, with aid from Yixin, Prince Gong, the Xianfeng Emperor's sixth brother, and, Yixuan, Prince Chun, the Xianfeng's seventh brother, and husband of Noble Consort Yi's younger sister, Yehenara Wanzhen, the Empress and Noble Consort Yi staged a coup – historically known as the Xinyou Coup – against the eight regents and ousted them from power, thereby securing control of the regency.

Noble Consort Yi was elevated to the status of Empress Dowager and honoured as "Holy Mother, Empress Dowager" (聖母皇太后), since she was not the Xianfeng Emperor's primary wife and became Empress Dowager only as the biological mother of the reigning Tongzhi Emperor. She was given the honorific name "Cixi". The Empress, on the other hand, as the former Emperor's primary wife and the reigning Emperor's nominal mother, was also elevated to Empress Dowager and honoured as "Mother Empress, Empress Dowager" (母后皇太后) – a title which gave her precedence over Empress Dowager Cixi – and was given the honorific name "Ci'an". Because her living quarters were in the eastern part of the Forbidden City, Empress Dowager Ci'an was informally referred to as the "East Empress Dowager"; Empress Dowager Cixi, who lived in the western part, was also informally known as the "West Empress Dowager". Empress Dowager Ci'an spent most of her life in the Palace of Gathering Essence. On several occasions after 1861, Ci'an was given additional honorific names (two Chinese characters at a time), as was customary for emperors and empresses, until by the end of her life her name was a long even string of characters beginning with Ci'an.

Imperial records did not explain why there was a difference of 24 hours between the times when the Empress Niohuru and Noble Consort Yi were elevated from their original statuses to the same position of empress dowager. According to Tony Teng, Noble Consort Yi and Sushun had a quarrel over the granting of honours after the Xianfeng Emperor's death. It is believed that the Empress, as the primary wife of the recently deceased emperor, had supported Noble Consort Yi, thus forcing Sushun to yield.

The two empresses dowager were appointed joint de facto regents for the Tongzhi Emperor. Because women were not allowed to be seen during imperial court sessions, they had to sit behind a curtain while attending such sessions together with the child emperor. Although in principle she had precedence over Cixi, Ci'an was in fact a self-effacing person and seldom intervened in politics, unlike Cixi, who actually controlled the imperial court. As de facto ruler, Ci'an had to learn about politics, so she and Cixi studied history. In November 1861, in keeping with the imperial custom, they began to consult the records of their Manchu predecessors. In June 1863, they had the contents of Tong Jian Ji Lan (通鑑輯覽) explained to them. About a year earlier, an earlier compilation by scholars from the Hanlin Academy, entitled A Valuable Mirror for Excellent Governance (治平寶鑑), became the text for a series of lectures by scholars and officials that the empresses dowager attended for over two years, the last lecture given in November 1866.

It is thought by many biographers that Cixi was the actual power behind the throne. Despite this, for the first 20 years of her regency she was not allowed to make decisions on her own. Any decree needed the approval of both regents. Both Ci'an and the Tongzhi Emperor were given a seal, but because the emperor was underage, the seal was given to his mother, Cixi. Ci'an's seal was engraved with "Yushang" (Imperial Award) and Cixi's with "Tongdaotang" (Hall of Accord with the Way).

==== An Dehai ====
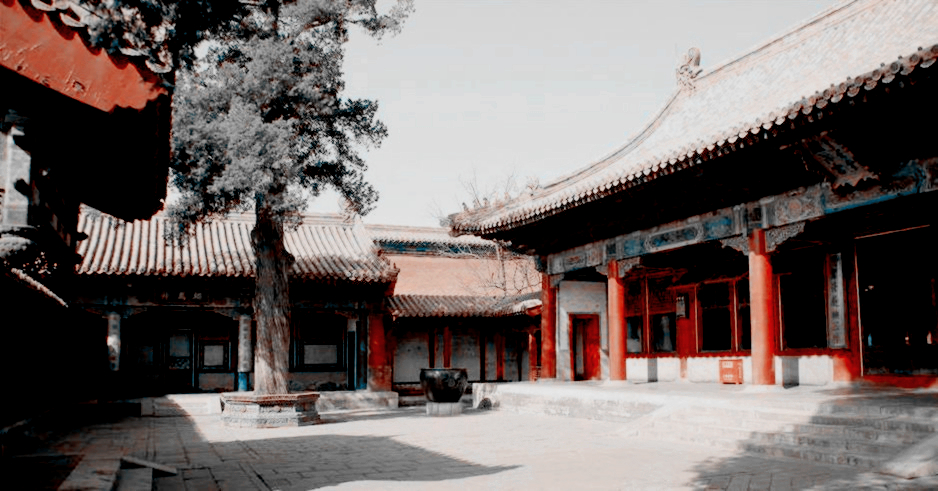
Palace of Gathering Essence

The years after the Xianfeng Emperor's death were called the Tongzhi Restoration. It was a period of peace; the Taiping Rebellion and the Opium Wars with the British ceased. The treasury began growing again after decades of depletion. Empress Dowager Ci'an was little mentioned during this period and her only notable intervention in politics was in 1869. An Dehai, a court eunuch and close aide of Empress Dowager Cixi, was on a trip south to purchase a set of dragon robes for Cixi. While travelling in Shandong Province, he abused his authority by extorting money from people and causing trouble. Ding Baozhen, the Governor of Shandong, reported An Dehai's deeds to the imperial court. Empress Dowager Ci'an received news about it and drafted an imperial decree as follows:

Ding Baozhen reports that a eunuch has been creating disturbance in Shandong Province. According to the magistrate of Dezhou, a eunuch surnamed An and his followers passed through that place by the way of the imperial canal, in two dragon barges, with much display of pomp and pageantry. He announced that he had come on an imperial mission to procure dragon robes. His barges flew a black banner, bearing in its centre the triple imperial emblems of the sun, and there were also dragon and phoenix flags flying on both side, of his vessels. A goodly company of both sexes were in the attendance on this person; there were female musicians, skilled in the use of string and wind instruments. The banks of the canal were lined with crowds of spectators, who witnessed with amazement and admiration his progress. The 21st day of the last month happened to be this eunuch's birthday, so he arrayed himself in dragon robes and stood on the foredeck of his barge, to receive the homage of his suite. The local magistrate was just about to order his arrest when the barges set sail and proceeded southwards. The governor adds that he has already given orders for his immediate arrest.

We are dumbfounded at his report. How can we ever hope to uphold moral standards within the palace and frighten evildoers unless we make an example of this insolent eunuch, who was dared to leave Beijing without permission and commit these lawless deeds? The governors of these three provinces of Shandong, Henan and Jiangsu are ordered to seek out and arrest the eunuch An whom we had formerly honored with the rank of the sixth grade and the decoration of the crow's feather. Upon his being duly identified by his companions, let him be forth with beheaded, without further formalities, no attention is to be paid to any crafty explanations which he may attempt to make. The governors concerned will be held responsible in the event of failure to affect his arrest.

An Dehai was beheaded on 12 September 1869. This was quite an unusual reaction for Empress Dowager Ci'an, and the execution of An Dehai is said to have greatly displeased Empress Dowager Cixi. Some sources say that Prince Kung forced Ci'an to take an independent decision for a change. Several days after the arrest an edict was issued by Ci'an:

"Ding Baozhen now reports that the eunuch was arrested in Tai'an Prefecture and has been summarily beheaded. Our dynasty's house law is most strict in regard to the proper discipline of eunuchs, and provides severe punishment for any offences to which they may commit. They have always been sternly forbidden to make expeditions to the provinces, or to create trouble. Nevertheless, An Dehai actually had brazen effrontery to violate this law, and for his crimes his execution is only a fitting reward. In future, let all eunuchs take warning by his example; should we have further cause of complaint, the chief eunuchs of the several departments of the household will be punished as well as the actual offender. Any eunuch who may hereafter pretend that he has been sent on imperial business to the provinces shall be cast into chains at once, and sent to Beijing for punishment".

==== The Tongzhi Emperor's marriage and death ====
In 1872, both Ci'an and Cixi agreed it was time for the Tongzhi Emperor to marry. As the highest-ranking woman in the Forbidden City, Ci'an was put in charge of selecting the Tongzhi Emperor's new empress and consorts. It was decided that a girl from the Mongol Alute clan (the later Empress Xiaozheyi) would become the new empress. Lady Alute's mother was Empress Dowager Ci'an's cousin from her father's side. After the wedding, both empresses dowager resigned as co-regents, but they resumed the regency in December 1874 during the Tongzhi Emperor's illness. In January 1875, the Tongzhi emperor died, at the age of eighteen. As Tongzhi was childless, Cixi's nephew, Zaitian, the son of Prince Chun, the brother of the long deceased Xianfeng emperor, and Wanzhen, Cixi's younger sister, was selected to ascend to the throne as Emperor Guangxu. As the Guangxu Emperor was also underage at the time of his accession, the two empresses dowager became the regents again.

=== Guangxu era ===
During the late 1870s, Empress Dowager Cixi became ill from liver problems, so Empress Dowager Ci'an had to rule on her own. During this time, she had to deal with the war with the Russian Empire over Ili Prefecture. In 1871, the Dungan Revolt broke out in Xinjiang. The Qing Empire soon lost power and the Russians occupied the Ili basin region. The Qing government regained control over Xinjiang in 1877. In 1879, the Russians suggested that they maintain a strong presence in the region but the Qing government did not agree. The conflict ended with the signing of the Treaty of Saint Petersburg in February 1881.

Although Ci'an rarely left the Forbidden City, she did visit the imperial tombs to pay respect to her husband and ancestors. In 1880, while at the Eastern Qing tombs, Ci'an, probably encouraged by Prince Kung to assert herself and her rights, took precedence in all the ceremonies. While at the Xianfeng Emperor's tomb, a commotion happened between Ci'an and Cixi. Ci'an, as the primary wife of the deceased emperor, took the central position. She told Cixi to stand on the right and reminded her that she was only a concubine while the Xianfeng Emperor was still living. The vacant spot on the left was symbolically reserved for the Xianfeng Emperor's first consort, Empress Xiaodexian. It is not known how Cixi reacted to this incident.

==== Death ====
On 8 April 1881, while attending an imperial court session, Empress Dowager Ci'an became ill and was escorted to her private quarters, where she died within a few hours. Her sudden death was a shock to many people. Although she was in good health, Ci'an had fallen seriously ill at least three times according to Weng Tonghe, who tutored the Guangxu Emperor. She had a history of what appeared to be strokes. In his diary, Weng Tonghe recorded the first stroke in March 1863, when Ci'an suddenly fainted and lost her ability to speak for nearly a month. Her reputation for 'speaking slowly and with difficulty' during audiences may have been a consequence of her stroke. A second stroke was recorded in January 1870. The official cause of her death between 21:00 and 23:00 hours was a sudden stroke. Physicians who studied her medical records are almost certain that she died of a massive brain haemorrhage.

Thirty years after her death, rumours started spreading that she had been poisoned by Empress Dowager Cixi. However, such claims have never been substantiated and new evidence has not appeared in the many years since. Furthermore, Cixi herself had been ill to the point of being unable to serve her functions at court, making her involvement in Ci'an's death highly unlikely.

One of the most circulated rumours is that before his death, the Xianfeng Emperor wrote a secret imperial edict and gave it to Ci'an. Apparently, the emperor foresaw that Cixi would try to overrule Ci'an and dominate the imperial court, so he wrote the edict to authorise Ci'an to have Cixi eliminated if necessary. Ci'an, believing that Cixi would not harm her, showed her the secret edict and burnt it to demonstrate her trust in her co-regent. She died under mysterious circumstances later that day.

The posthumous name given to Empress Dowager Ci'an, which combines the honorific names she gained during her lifetime with new names added just after her death, was:

- (Chinese: 孝貞慈安裕慶和敬誠靖儀天祚聖顯皇后)

which reads:

- "Empress Xiao ² -zhen ³ Ci'an Yuqing Hejing Chengjing Yitian Zuosheng ^{4} Xian ^{5} ".

This long name is still the one that can be seen on Ci'an's tomb today. The short form of her posthumous name is:

- "Empress Xiaozhenxian" (Chinese: 孝貞顯皇后).

After her death a valedictory degree was written for Ci'an which reads:

"In spite of the arduous duties of the State, which have fully occupied my time, I was naturally of robust constitution and had therefore fully expected to attain to a good old age and to enjoy the Emperor's dutiful ministrations. Yesterday, however, I was suddenly stricken with a slight illness and his Majesty thereupon commanded his physician to attend me; later his Majesty came in person to enquire as to my health. And now, most unexpectedly, I have had a most dangerous relapse. At 1900 hours this evening I became completely confused in mind and now all hope of my recovery appears to be vain. I am forty-five years of age and for close on twenty years have held the high position of a regent of the empire. Many honorific titles and ceremonies of congratulation have been bestowed upon me: what cause have I therefore to regret?"

This translation of the valedictory comes from John Bland and Edmund Backhouse's book China Under the Empress Dowager. Another translation of the valedictory is found in "Papers relating to the foreign relations of the United States" which contains corresponding letters between James Burrill Angell and James B. Blaine. Angell's first letter about Ci'an was written three days after her death and received on 23 June 1881:

"Sir: I have to announce that on the 8th instant, at 6PM, the Empress Dowager, commonly known as the Empress of the East Palace, in distinction from the Empress Dowager of the West Palace, died after an illness of only two days. The legations have, at the time of this writing, received no official announcement of the event. But the Peking Gazette contains two imperial rescripts concerning her death. As the mail leaves at once I cannot now inclose translation of them.

The deceased Empress is the widow of the Emperor Hsien-Fung, who reigned from 1850 to 1861. Having lost his wife just as he ascended the throne, he married the lady just deceased. She bore him no son. In 1856 one of his concubines or second wives bore him a son, who succeeded him as the Emperor Tung-Chih in 1861. At the death of Hsien-Fung, his wife, the woman who just died, was, of course, the Empress Dowager. But by decree of the new Emperor, Tung-Chih, his mother was also raised to the honor of Empress Dowager. So there have been two Empresses Dowager since 1861. The present Emperor, Kwang-Hsü, who came to the throne in 1874, is the cousin of Tung-Chih and nephew of the surviving Empress Dowager. The two Empresses, it is thought, have played a considerable part in the conduct of affairs. The deceased Empress has been reputed to be of a pacific spirit, and friendly to Prince Kung. The surviving Empress has been thought to take a more active part in shaping the policy of the empire. She has been so ill for months that her death has been daily expected, and several times reported in the streets. But the Empress of the East Palace has not been ill, until she was seized last week with her fatal disease. I think she was about forty-five years of age. It is feared that her sudden death may have an unfavorable and possibly fatal effect on the surviving Empress in her condition of weakness.

It is impossible to say yet whether the death of the Empress of the East Palace will lead to any important political results. Should the other Empress also die, it is extremely possible that important consequences would follow, though no one can predict what they would be. Vague rumors of plottings in the palace are afloat, but as yet they are but rumors and not worth repeating.

On 30 April 1881, Angell wrote a second letter about Ci'an, to Blaine. It contained a translation of an imperial edict sent by Prince Kung and a farewell mandate which appeared in the Peking Gazette. The imperial edict reads as follows:

Since Our entrance upon the inheritance of the great dynastic line, looking upward, We have been the recipient of fostering care and unbounded maternal affection from the departed Empress, T'zu-an Twan-Yu-K'ang-Ching-Chao-Ho-Chwang-Ching.

During the seven years which have elapsed since Our accession to the Throne, as, anticipating Her wishes, with respectable care we provided for her wants. Our efforts have been greatly rewarded by the joyous and happy contentment which She has always manifested.

The robust health which we seemed to recognize in Her appearance and movements, and Her zeal for state affairs at all times, were a source of great joy and comfort to our mind, and we hoped that Her life would be prolonged a hundred years, that She might long continue in the enjoyment of happiness. On the 7th instant the benign body was suddenly taken ill. A decoction of medicine was immediately given to dissipate the ailment and restore health, but unexpectedly on the following day the sickness rapidly grew dangerous, respiration was hindered by copious generation of phlegm, and the case became urgent and desperate. Between the hours of 7 and 9PM the benign spirit rode in the fairy chariot and ascended to the remote regions. Prostrate upon the earth, with outstretched arms, we raised our cry to Heaven, bewailing our overwhelming grief.

We have reverently received the dying behest of the departed Empress that the mourning garb be laid aside after twenty-seven days. Our feelings would indeed be hard to reconcile if we should do this. We shall therefore observe deep mourning for one hundred days, and half mourning for the full term of twenty-seven months, to manifest in some degree our sincere sorrow at this bereavement. The departed Empress having also admonished us to endeavor to control our sorrow and give due regard to the importance of state affairs so as to console the Empress Dowager, "T'zu-hsi Twan-Yü-Kang-Yi-Chao-Yü-Chwang-Ch'eng," in return for Her care in educating and nurturing us, we dare not disregard this advice, and, in respectful obedience to the bequaethed command, we shall endeavor to check and restrain our sorrow.

Let the Prince of T'un, Yi Tsung; the Prince of Kung, Yi Hsin; the Beile, Yi-Kwang; the minister of the presence, Ching Shou; the grand secretary, Pao-Chun; the assistant great secretary and president, Ling-Kuei; and the presidents, Ngen-Ch'eng and Ong-Fung-Ho, with respectful care attend to the rites and ceremonies to be observed in the present mourning.[Let them carefully examine the prescriptions of the old canon and memorialize us as to the appropriate rites and ceremonies to be observed. Let this decree be promulgated throughout the Empire for the information of all.]

Respect this.

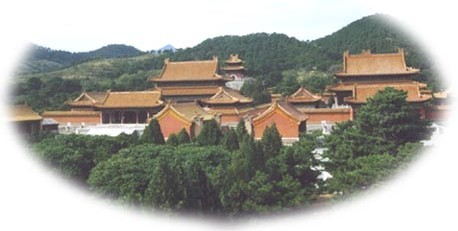
The Eastern Ding Mausoleum (Puxiangyu Eastern Ding Mausoleum on the left, Putuoyu Eastern Ding Mausoleum on the right)

Empress Dowager Ci'an was interred amidst the Eastern Qing tombs, 125 km (78 mi) east of Beijing. She was denied burial next to her husband in the Ding Mausoleum. Instead she was interred in the Eastern Ding Mausoleum (定東陵) tomb complex, along with Empress Dowager Cixi. More precisely, Empress Dowager Ci'an lies in the Puxiangyu Eastern Ding Mausoleum (普祥峪定東陵; 'tomb east of the Ding Mausoleum in the vale of wide good omen'), while Cixi built herself the much larger Putuoyu Eastern Ding Mausoleum (菩陀峪定東陵; 'tomb east of the Ding Mausoleum in the vale of Putuo'). The Ding Mausoleum (literally "tomb of quietude") is the tomb of the Xianfeng Emperor and is located west of the Dingdongling. The vale of Putuo owes its name to Mount Putuo, at the foot of which the Eastern Ding Mausoleum is located.

== Appraisal ==
Ci'an is popularly viewed in China as quiet, never hot-tempered, kind, and highly respected by the Xianfeng Emperor. Both the Tongzhi and Guangxu Emperors preferred Ci'an above Cixi. Her good-hearted personality was no match for Cixi, who managed to sideline the naive and candid Ci'an.

However, some historians have painted a very different reality, mainly that of a self-indulgent and idle Empress Dowager Ci'an, who did not care as much for government and hard work as she cared for the pleasures and sweet life inside the Forbidden City. Empress Dowager Cixi, on the other hand, was a shrewd and intelligent woman who was ready to make sacrifices and work hard in order to obtain supreme power, and who faced the complex problems that were besetting China at the time. As often, the reality may lie in between these two extremes and some even claim that Ci'an is said to have exhibited temper and willpower. The popular view of Ci'an being a nice simple girl was exaggerated by the reformer Kang Youwei and biographers John Bland and Edmund Backhouse, to build up the contrast between her and Cixi. There are no documented meetings between any foreigner and Ci'an, unlike Cixi, who met many foreigners after 1900.

Katherine Carl, who spent nine months with Empress Dowager Cixi in 1903, described Ci'an, even though she never met her, as follows: Ci'an was known as the "Literary Empress". While Cixi handled all state affairs, Ci'an gave herself up to literary pursuits and led the life of a student. She was a woman of such fine literary ability that she herself sometimes examined the essays of the aspirants for the highest literary honours at the University of Beijing. She was also a writer of distinction. Ci'an and Cixi lived amicably together, appreciated each other's qualities, and are said to have had a sincere affection for each other, which never weakened during the whole of their long association. Their amicable relation ended with the death of Ci'an in 1881.

Another view of Ci'an was written by Lim Boon Keng. The beautiful Yehenara, like the Jew Hagar, was the handmaid who was to bear a son for her master. Ci'an appears to have been like Sarah, who in her anxiety to make up for her own sterility, encouraged her husband to show his favour to his maid. Perhaps the Xianfeng Emperor did not need encouragement, but Ci'an took great interest in the concubine as the prospective mother of the emperor's son and heir. Cixi was quick-tempered and probably jealous of the empress. Just before the birth of the Tongzhi Emperor, Cixi was nearly demoted in rank for her bad temper and insolence. Ci'an intervened on her behalf. In contrast to Hagar, Cixi did not openly despise her mistress. She was as tame as a lamb, and for many years they lived on terms of friendship.

== Titles ==
- During the reign of the Daoguang Emperor (r. 1820–1850):
  - Lady Niohuru (from 12 August 1837)
- During the reign of the Xianfeng Emperor (r. 1850–1861):
  - Imperial Concubine Zhen (貞嬪; from 14 June 1852), fifth rank consort
  - Noble Consort Zhen (貞貴妃; from June/July 1852), third rank consort
  - Empress (皇后; from November/December 1852)
- During the reign of the Tongzhi Emperor (r. 1861–1875):
  - Empress Dowager Ci'an (慈安皇太后; from 22 August 1861)
- During the reign of the Guangxu Emperor (r. 1875–1908):
  - Empress Xiaozhenxian (孝貞顯皇后; from May/June 1881)

== Gallery ==
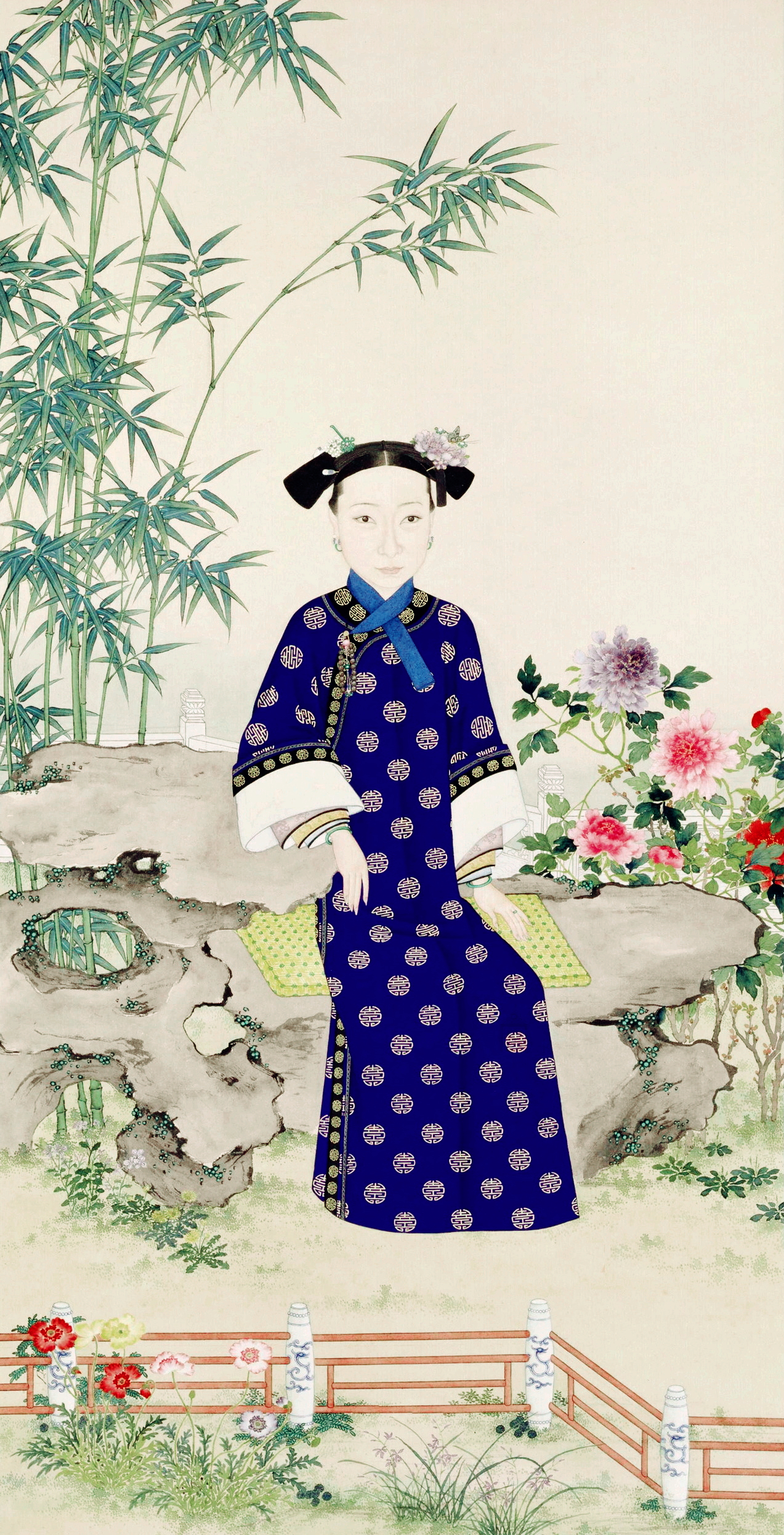
In daily dress

In daily dress

== In fiction and popular culture ==
- Portrayed by Chan Wah in The Burning of Imperial Palace (1983) and Reign Behind a Curtain (1983)
- Portrayed by Sam-sam in The Rise and Fall of Qing Dynasty (1990)
- Portrayed by Song Jia in Sigh of His Highness (2006)
- Portrayed by Rachel Kan in Land of Wealth (2006)
- Portrayed by Maggie Shiu in The Confidant (2012)

== See also ==
- Ranks of imperial consorts in China#Qing
- Royal and noble ranks of the Qing dynasty

== Notes ==
1. i.e. mother of the Tongzhi Emperor
2. "filial"; during the Qing dynasty, this was always the first character at the beginning of empresses' posthumous names
3. same character as when she was a concubine
4. this string of 12 characters are the honorific names that she received while alive, with possibly the last characters having been added only just after her death
5. "the Clear", or "the Illustrious"; this is the posthumous name of the Xianfeng Emperor; during the Qing dynasty the last character of empresses' posthumous names was always the posthumous name of their emperor

Empress Dowager Ci'an Niohuru Clan
Chinese royalty
Preceded by Empress Xiaoquancheng of the Niohuru clan	Empress consort of China; 24 July 1852 – 22 August 1861	Succeeded by Empress Xiaozheyi of the Arute clan
Preceded by Empress Dowager Kangci (Xiaojingcheng) of the Borjigit clan	Empress dowager of China; 22 August 1861 – 8 April 1881 with Xingzhen, Empress Dowager Cixi	Succeeded by Xingzhen, Empress Dowager Cixi (Xiaoqinxian) of the Yehe-Nara clan as sole empress dowager
