= Muyin =

Qing dynasty politician (1814–1872)

Regent of Qing Dynasty
- In office 22 August – 8 November 1861 Serving with Zaiyuan, Duanhua, Sushun, Jingshou, Kuang Yuan, Du Han and Jiao Youying
- Appointed by: Xianfeng Emperor
- Monarch: Tongzhi Emperor

Chief Grand Councillor
- In office 15 October 1860 – 8 November 1861
- Preceded by: Peng Yunzhang
- Succeeded by: Yixin, Prince Gong

Grand Councillor
- In office 10 April 1851 – 2 November 1861

Minister of War
- In office 30 December 1859 – 8 November 1861 Serving with Chen Fu'en (until 1860), Shen Zhaolin (1860–1861), Zhu Fengbiao (since 1861)
- Preceded by: Quanqing
- Succeeded by: Linkui

Ministry of Lifan Yuan
- In office 1 February – 30 December 1859
- Preceded by: Ruichang
- Succeeded by: Chunyou

Personal details
- Born: Muyin (穆蔭); 1814
- Died: 23 January 1872 (aged 57–58) Beijing
- Education: central government school (guanxue)
- Occupation: politician
- Clan name: Tohoro (托活洛)
- Courtesy name: Qingxuan (清軒)

Military service
- Allegiance: Qing dynasty
- Branch/service: Manchu Plain White Banner

Muyin (Chinese: 穆蔭, 1814–23 January 1872), courtesy name Qingxuan (清軒), was a Qing dynasty official from the Manchu Tohoro clan (托活洛氏) and the Manchu Plain White Banner.

Muyin had studied in central government school ("guanxue", 官學). He was appointed the Secretary of the Cabinet (內閣中書), the General of Military Secrets (軍機章京), then the Reader-in-waiting Secretary of the Cabinet (內閣侍讀學士). He was appointed the Grand Councillor by Xianfeng Emperor in 1851.

In 1853, Northern Expeditionary Force of the Taiping rebels harassed Henan and Zhili. The capital was under martial law, Muyin, Sengge Rinchen, Huashana (花沙納) and Dahūngga (達洪阿) were ordered to handle patrol matters for the various battalions in the capital. Later, he had served as the Senior Deputy Minister of Rites (禮部左侍郎), Junior Deputy Minister of Personnel (吏部右侍郎), Minister of Lifan Yuan (理藩院尚書), and Minister of War (兵部尚書) and other positions. In 1860, during the Second Opium War, he and Zaiyuan (Prince Yi) made the Imperial Commissioners in charge of peace negotiations with Anglo-French army. They met British and French officials in Tongzhou. When the negotiations failed, the members of the British delegation, including Sir Harry Parkes, were arrested by Qing soldiers and escorted to Beijing for trial, where they were incarcerated and tortured. In the meantime, Anglo-French expeditionary forces closed in on Beijing, Muyin and Zaiyuan were replaced by Prince Gong as negotiator for peace. However, the Allies continued to advance on Beijing. Muyin fled with the Xianfeng Emperor to the Chengde Mountain Resort in Hebei.

Before the Xianfeng Emperor died in 1861, the emperor appointed eight men to assist his son, whom later enthroned as the Tongzhi Emperor. The eight regents were: Zaiyuan, Prince Yi of the First Rank; Duanhua, Prince Zheng of the First Rank; Sushun, the Minister of Revenue; Jingshou (景壽), a prince consort; Muyin, the Minister of War; Kuang Yuan (匡源), the Senior Deputy Minister of Personnel; Du Han (杜翰), the Junior Deputy Minister of Rites; and Jiao Youying (焦祐瀛), the Vice Minister of the Court of the Imperial Stud. Later that year, the eight regents were ousted from power in the Xinyou Coup orchestrated by Prince Gong and Empress Dowager Cixi. Muyin was stripped of official positions and sent to serve at frontier military outposts (軍臺效力) in Xinjiang. In 1864, he completed the installment payment for the fine, and was allowed to return to Beijing. He died at home in 1872.
