= Empress Xiaodexian =

Consort of the Xianfeng Emperor (1831–1850)

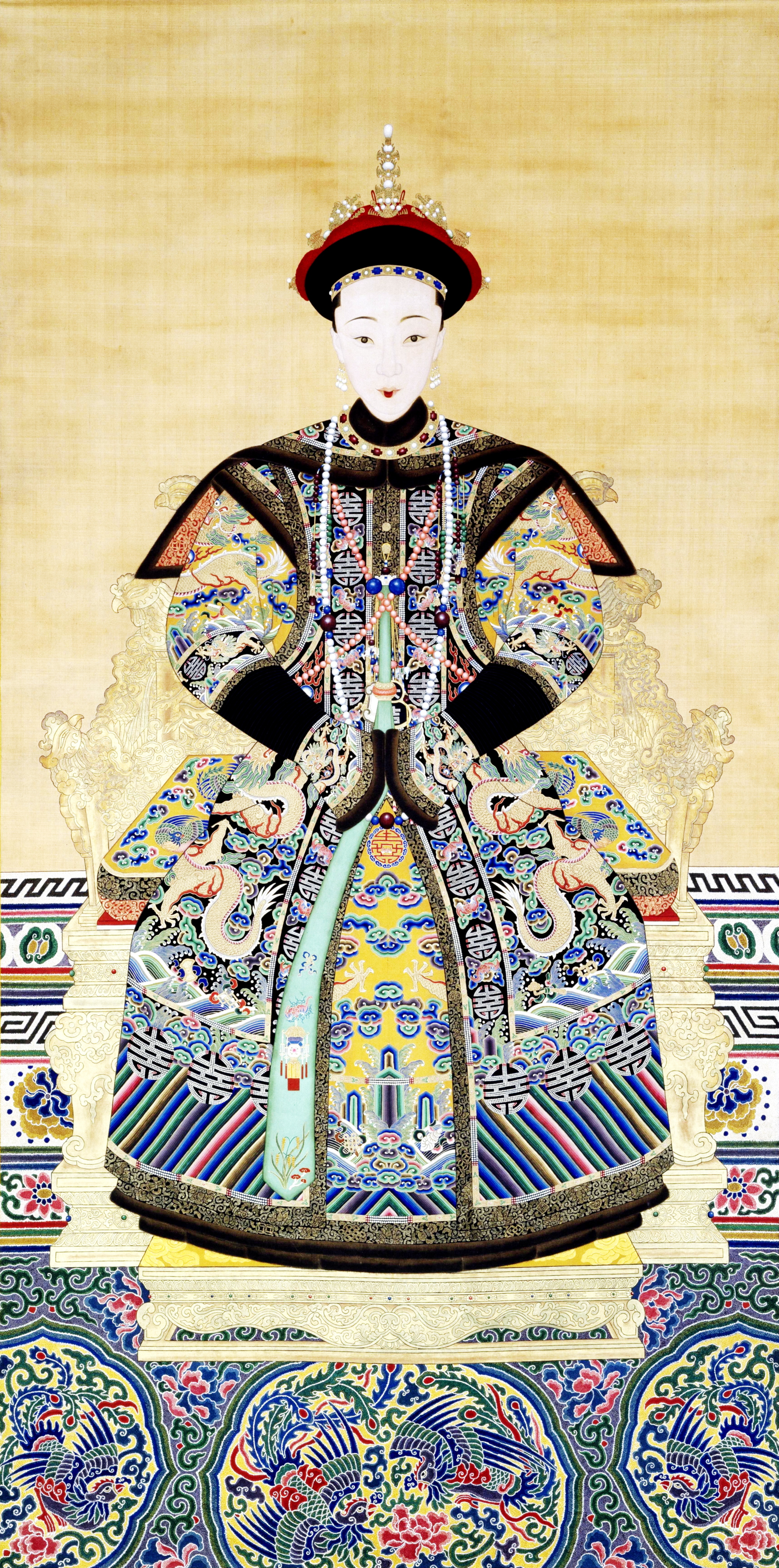
- Qing Dynasty portrait of Empress Xiaodexian, probably mid-19th century
- Born: 12 April 1831 (道光十一年 三月 一日)
- Died: 24 January 1850 (aged 18) (道光二十九年 十二月 十二日)
- Burial: Ding Mausoleum, Eastern Qing tombs
- Spouse: Xianfeng Emperor (m. 1848)
Posthumous name
- Empress Xiaode Wenhui Chengshun Cizhuang Keshen Huiyi Gongtian Zansheng Xian (孝德溫惠誠順慈莊恪慎徽懿恭天贊聖顯皇后)
- House: Sakda (薩克達; by birth); Aisin Gioro (by marriage)
- Father: Futai (富泰)
- Mother: Lady Aisin Gioro

Empress Xiaodexian
- Traditional Chinese: 孝德顯皇后
- Simplified Chinese: 孝德显皇后
Transcriptions
Standard Mandarin
- Hanyu Pinyin: Xiàodéxiǎn Huánghòu

Empress Xiaodexian (12 April 1831 – 24 January 1850), of the Manchu Bordered Yellow Banner Sakda clan, was a consort of the Xianfeng Emperor of China's Qing dynasty.

== Life ==
=== Family background ===
Empress Xiaodexian's personal name was not recorded in history. Her family originally belonged to the Bordered Blue Banner.

- Father: Futai (富泰), served as a fourth rank literary official (少卿) in the Court of Imperial Sacrifices, and held the title of a duke (公)
  - Paternal grandfather: Qichang (祺昌)
  - Paternal grandmother: Lady Nara
- Mother: Lady Aisin Gioro
  - Maternal grandfather: Ulgungga (烏爾恭阿; 1778–1846), held the title Prince Zheng of the First Rank from 1794–1846, Jirgalang's great great great great grandson
  - Maternal uncle: Duanhua (1807–1861), held the title Prince Zheng of the First Rank from 1846–1861, the maternal grandfather of Empress Xiaozheyi (1854–1875)
- One sister
- One younger brother

=== Daoguang era ===
The future Empress Xiaodexian was born on the first day of the third lunar month in the 11th year of the reign of the Daoguang Emperor, which translates to 12 April 1831 in the Gregorian calendar.

In 1847, Lady Sakda married Yizhu, the fourth son of the Daoguang Emperor, and became Yizhu's primary consort.

==== Illness and death ====
Her health began to weaken after she entered the palace and she developed an external cold in August 1848. Toward late September into early October 1849, due to blood deficiency and liver wind, she was bedridden for a long period and under extended treatment. Her condition somewhat improved in December. On 24 January 1850, Lady Sakda conditions deterriated rapidly, and she died that same day. Scholars who have studied her medical case conclude that she suffered from a long-term liver disease, which led to chronic weakness of her vital energy and blood.

=== Xianfeng era ===
About a month after her death, the Daoguang Emperor died and was succeeded by Yizhu, who became the Xianfeng Emperor. As the Xianfeng Emperor's primary consort, Lady Sakda was posthumously honored as Empress and was interred in the Ding Mausoleum of the Eastern Qing tombs.

== Titles ==
- During the reign of the Daoguang Emperor (r. 1820–1850):
  - Lady Sakda (from 12 April 1831)
  - Primary consort (嫡福晉; from 31 March 1848)
- During the reign of the Xianfeng Emperor (r. 1850–1861):
  - Empress Xiaode (孝德皇后; from 30 November 1850)
- During the reign of the Tongzhi Emperor (r. 1861–1875):
  - Empress Xiaodexian (孝德顯皇后; from December 1861 or January 1862)

== See also ==
- Ranks of imperial consorts in China#Qing
- Royal and noble ranks of the Qing dynasty

== Notes ==
Chinese royalty
Preceded by Empress Xiaoquancheng	Empress of China posthumous	Succeeded by Empress Xiaojingcheng
