= Sushun =

Sushun may refer to:

- Emperor Sushun (died 592), emperor of Japan during the Asuka period
- Sushun (Qing dynasty) (1816–1861), politician and regent during the Chinese Qing dynasty

== See also ==
- Şüşün, also known as Shushun, a village and municipality in the Kurdamir Rayon of Azerbaijan
