= Iljik Son clan =

Korean clan from North Gyeongsang Province

Iljik Son clan Andong-Son clan
- Country: Korea
- Current region: Andong
- Founder: Son Eung
- Connected members: Masayoshi Son
- Website: http://www.iljikson.com/

Iljik Son clan (Korean: 일직 손씨; Hanja: 一直 孫氏) is one of the Korean clans. Their Bon-gwan is in Andong, North Gyeongsang Province. According to the research held in 2000, the number of members of the Iljik Son clan was 24187.

Their founder was Son Eung who naturalized from the Song dynasty. They included generals such as Son Gan (Hanja: 孫幹) and Son Cheo nul (Hanja: 孫處訥), leader of loyal armies, who beat Toyotomi Hideyoshi who dispatched troops to Korea. Other distinguished military leaders were Son Rin (Hanja: 孫遴), who distinguished himself in the Later Jin invasion of Joseon and Son Jin min (Hanja: 孫必億), who became administrative commissioner of the Security Council.

== See also ==
- Korean clan names of foreign origin
