= Jirgalang =

- Prince Zheng of the First Rank

Prince Zheng of the First Rank
- Tenure: 14 May 1636 – 11 June 1655
- Predecessor: peerage created
- Successor: Jidu
- Born: 19 November 1599
- Died: 11 June 1655 (aged 55)
Names
- Jirgalang
Posthumous name
- Prince Zhengxian of the First Rank (鄭獻親王)
- House: Aisin Gioro
- Father: Šurhaci
- Mother: Lady Ula Nara, Sister of Bujantai

Jirgalang

Chinese name
- Traditional Chinese: 濟爾哈朗
- Simplified Chinese: 济尔哈朗
Transcriptions
Standard Mandarin
- Hanyu Pinyin: Jì'ěrhālǎng

Manchu name
- Manchu script: ᠵᡳᡵᡤᠠᠯᠠᠩ
- Romanization: Jirgalang

Jirgalang or Jirhalang (Manchu: ᠵᡳᡵᡤᠠᠯᠠᠩ; 19 November 1599 – 11 June 1655) was a Manchu noble, regent, and political and military leader of the early Qing dynasty. Born in the Aisin Gioro clan, he was the sixth son of Šurhaci, a younger brother of Nurhaci, the founder of the Qing dynasty. From 1638 to 1643, he took part in many military campaigns that helped destroy the Ming dynasty. After the death of Huangtaiji (Nurhaci's successor) in September 1643, Jirgalang became one of the young Shunzhi Emperor's two co-regents, but he soon yielded most political power to co-regent Dorgon in October 1644. Dorgon eventually purged him of his regent title in 1647. After Dorgon died in 1650, Jirgalang led an effort to clean the government of Dorgon's supporters. Jirgalang was one of ten "princes of the first rank" (和碩親王) whose descendants were made "iron-cap" princes (鐵帽子王), who had the right to transmit their princely titles to their direct male descendants perpetually.

== Career before 1643 ==
In 1627, Jirgalang took part in the first Manchu campaign against Korea under the command of his older brother Amin. In 1630, when Amin was stripped of his titles for having failed to fight an army of the Ming dynasty, Huangtaiji gave Jirgalang control of the Bordered Blue Banner, which had been under Amin's command. As one of "four senior beile" (the other three were Daišan, Manggūltai, and Huangtaiji himself), Jirgalang participated in many military campaigns against the Ming and the Chahar Mongols. In 1636 he was granted the title "Prince Zheng of the First Rank", with rights of perpetual inheritance. In 1642, Jirgalang led the siege of Jinzhou, an important Ming city in Liaodong that surrendered to Qing forces in April of that year after more than one year of resistance.

== Co-regency (1643-1647) and disgrace (1647-1650) ==
Flag of the Bordered Blue Banner, of which Jirgalang was given control in 1630.

While Dorgon was staying in Mukden, in November or December 1643 Jirgalang was sent to attack Shanhai Pass, a fortified Ming position that guarded access to the plain around Beijing. In January or February 1644, Jirgalang requested that his name be placed after Dorgon's in all official communications. On February 17, 1644, Jirgalang, who was a capable military leader but looked uninterested in managing state affairs, willingly yielded control of all official matters to Dorgon. He was not present when Qing forces entered Beijing in early June 1644. In 1647 he was removed from his post of regent and replaced by Dorgon's brother Dodo. Despite his removal, Jirgalang continued to serve as a military leader. In March 1648, Dorgon ordered the arrest of Jirgalang on various charges and had Jirgalang degraded from a qinwang (first-rank prince) to a junwang (second-rank prince). Later in the same year, however, Jirgalang was sent to southern China to fight troops loyal to the Southern Ming. In early 1649, Jirgalang, accompanied by Han Chinese soldiers under Han Chinese banner general Prince Kong Youde loyal to the Qing, ordered a six-day massacre of the inhabitants of the city of Xiangtan in present-day Hunan due to fierce resistance by Li Chixin's army who were former Chuang (Li Zicheng's) partisans. Southern Ming loyalist He Tengjiao was also killed at Xiangtan by Kong Youde. He returned to Beijing in 1650 after having the capture of He Tengjiao against the forces of the Yongli Emperor, the last ruler of the Southern Ming regime.

The Southern Ming launched a massive counterattack in Hunan after He Tengjiao's death, erasing most of Kong Youde's gains, with Southern Ming general Hu Yiqing recapturing Quanzhou in Guangxi and Zhao Yinxuan and Hu Yiqing recapturing Wugang and arresting the Qing general Yang Yingyuan at Wugang, and recapturing Xinning, Chengbu and other counties. Wang Jincai recaptured Jingzhou, causing Qing general Yan Fengyu and other Qing officers to drown while retreating and Hu Yiqing recaptured Dong'an, lengshuitang and Yongzhou and Cao Zhijian took Hengyang and Ma Jinzhong took Baoqing.

== The "Jirgalang faction" (1651-1655) ==
The group led by Jirgalang that historian Robert Oxnam has called the "Jirgalang faction" was composed of Manchu princes and nobles who had opposed Dorgon and who returned to power after the latter died on December 31, 1650. Concerned that Dorgon's brother Ajige may try to succeed Dorgon, Jirgalang and his group arrested Ajige in early 1651. Jirgalang remained a powerful figure at the Qing imperial court until his death in 1655. The four future regents of the Kangxi Emperor, Oboi, Ebilun, Sonin, and Suksaha, were among his supporters.

== Death and posterity ==
Soon after Jirgalang died of illness on 11 June 1655, his second son Jidu (simplified Chinese: 济度; traditional Chinese: 濟度; pinyin: Jìdù; 1633–1660) inherited his princely title, but the name of the princehood was changed from "Zheng" (鄭) to "Jian" (簡). The title "Prince Zheng" was re-established in 1778 when the Qianlong Emperor praised Jirgalang for his role in the Qing defeat of Ming and granted Jirgalang a place in the Imperial Ancestral Temple.

Jirgalang's second son Jidu and Jidu's second son Labu (Chinese: 喇布; pinyin: Lăbù; d. 1681) participated in military campaigns in the second half of the Shunzhi Emperor's reign and the early reign of the Kangxi Emperor, notably against Koxinga and Wu Sangui.

Jirgalang's 13th generation descendants Duanhua (Prince Zheng) and Sushun (Duanhua's younger brother) were politically active during the reign of the Xianfeng Emperor (r. 1851-1861). They were appointed as two of eight regents for the infant Tongzhi Emperor (r. 1862-1874), but were quickly overthrown in 1861 in the Xinyou Coup that brought Empress Dowager Cixi and the young emperor's uncle Prince Gong to power.

== Family ==
- Father: Šurhaci
  - Paternal grandfather: Taksi
- Paternal grandmother: Hitara Emeci (喜塔拉·额穆齐)
- Mother: Ula-Nara Hunai (乌拉那拉·虎奈)

Consorts and issue

- Primary consort (嫡福晋), of the Niohuru clan (钮祜禄氏), daughter of Eidu
- Primary consort (嫡福晋), of the Yehe-Nara clan (叶赫那拉氏), daughter of De'erheli (德尔赫礼), granddaughter of Gintaisi
- Secondary consort (侧福晋), of the Gu'erhasu clan (钴尔哈苏氏), daughter of Zhuoliketu (卓礼克图)
  - Jidu (济度), Prince Jianchun of the First Rank (简纯亲王; 30 January 1633 – 6 August 1660), second son
- Secondary consort (侧福晋), of the Jarud Borjigin clan (扎鲁特 博尔济吉特氏), daughter of Bage (巴格)
  - Fu'erdun (富尔敦; 19 June 1633 – 9 June 1651), first son
  - Ledu (勒度; 11 March 1636 – 22 December 1655), third son
- Secondary consort (侧福晋), personal name Sutai (苏泰), of the Yehe-Nara clan (叶赫那拉氏), daughter of De'erheli (德尔赫礼), granddaughter of Gintaisi
- Mistress (庶福晋), of the Gūwalgiya clan (瓜尔佳氏), daughter of Chalalai (察喇赖)
  - Xitujun (锡图军; 1642–1651), sixth son
- Mistress (庶福晋), of the Sardu clan (萨尔都氏), daughter of Dahu (达祜)
  - Gumei (固美), seventh son; bulwark general (辅国将军)
- Mistress (庶福晋), of the Gūwalgiya clan (瓜尔佳氏), daughter of Zhata (扎塔)
  - Ba'erkan (巴尔堪), Prince Jianwu of the First Rank (简武亲王), fourth son
- Mistress (庶福晋), of the An clan (安氏), daughter of Tielani (贴喇尼)
  - Kunlan (裈兰), fifth son; first-rank military official (都统)
- Mistress (庶福晋), of the Yun clan (云氏), daughter of Dekesuoni (德克素尼)
  - Wuxi (武锡; 1653–1707); bulwark general (辅国将军)
- Mistress (庶福晋), of the Daigiya clan (戴佳氏), daughter of Nandahai (南达海)
- Mistress (庶福晋), of the Niohuru clan (钮祜禄氏), daughter of Bai'erge (伯尔格)
  - Liuxi (留锡; 1648–1703), eighth son
- Concubine (妾), of the Hešeri clan (赫舍里氏), daughter of Daidali (戴达礼)
  - Hailun (海伦; 4 March 1655 – 30 May 1663), tenth son
- Concubine (妾), of the Ma clan (马氏), daughter of Wulai (武赖)
- Concubine (妾), of Dai clan (戴氏)
- Concubine (妾), of the Jin clan (晋氏)
- Concubine (妾), of the Mengguosu clan (蒙郭苏氏), daughter of Maimishan (迈密山)
  - First daughter
    - Married E'erkedaiqing (额尔克戴青), of the Borjigin clan

== In popular culture ==
- Portrayed by Im Byung-ki in the 1981 KBS1 TV Series Daemyeong.
- Portrayed by Liu Haikuan in the 2017 TV Series Rule the World.

== See also ==
- Prince Zheng
- Royal and noble ranks of the Qing dynasty
- Ranks of imperial consorts in China#Qing
