= Jidu =

- Prince Jian of the First Rank 和碩簡親王

Prince Jian of the First Rank
- Tenure: 23 June 1657 – 6 August 1660
- Predecessor: Jirgalang (as Prince Zheng)
- Successor: Dese
- Born: 30 January 1633
- Died: 6 August 1660 (aged 27)
- Spouse: Lady Borjigit
- Issue: Desai; Labu; Yabu
Names
- Jidu
Posthumous name
- Prince Jianchun of the First Rank (簡純親王)
- House: Aisin Gioro
- Father: Jirgalang
- Mother: Lady Gurhas

Jidu (Chinese: 濟度; 30 January 1633 – 6 August 1660) was Qing dynasty imperial prince as the second son of Jirgalang, Nurhaci's nephew. Jidu was the second holder of Prince Zheng title under the name "Prince Jian of the First Rank". The previous name was restored only in 1778.

== Life ==
Jidu was born to lady Gurhas, third primary princess consort Zhengxian of the First Rank.

=== Political career ===
Jidu's active political career started after the death of Dorgon in 1651. It was said that Shunzhi Emperor deeply despised Dorgon for breaking ancestor's rules and wanted to dismiss the regents. Jidu opposed the idea by claiming that he is faithful and could attend to the affairs as prince regent.

His father largely contributed to purging the court of Dorgon's supporters, including Ajige, who might have succeeded his brother as prince regent. Jidu was appointed as one of the regents upon the underage Shunzhi Emperor together with Ledu, Duoni (Dodo's son and successor), Yolo (Abatai's son), Dulan (Sahaliyan's son), Shangshan (Feiyangwu's son) and Du'erhu (Cuyen's grandson). At that time, he became an heir apparent to Prince Zheng peerage. In 1655, Jidu was instated as a Dingyuan general, leading Manchu forces to defeat Koxinga. In 1656, Jidu's army suffered a defeat near Kinmen due to storm, losing most of naval forces.Koxinga was finally defeated in Nanjing. In 1657, when Jidu triumphally returned to the capital, he was informed about the funeral of his father and promoted to the prince of the first rank.

=== Death and legacy ===
Jidu died in 1660 and was succeeded by his third son, Desai. Jidu's military achievements were acknowledged by the Shunzhi Emperor, who did not only honour him with the title Prince Jianchun of the First Rank (简纯亲王), but had his memorial tablet placed in the adjacent shrine to the mausoleum of Hong Taiji. Jidu's legacy was continued by Labu, who was one of the Ming defectors in the early Kangxi era.

=== Tomb ===
Jidu is interred in the separate tomb on the western side of Prince Min mausoleum. Both mausoleums lay next to Jirhalang's tomb.

== Family ==
Jidu was married to the daughter of Chorji and biological sister of Empress Xiaohuizhang.

- Primary Consort (嫡福晉) of the Khorchin Borjigin clan (科爾沁 孛兒只斤氏)
  - Desai (德賽), Prince Jianhui of the First Rank (簡惠親王; 1654–1670), third son
  - Princess Duanmin of the First Rank (固倫端敏公主; 1653–1729), second daughter
    - Married Bandi (班第) of the Khorchin Borjigin clan, in 1670, and had issue (two sons)
- Secondary Consort (側福晉) of the Oirat Borjigin clan (吳魯特博 孛兒只斤氏)
- Secondary Consort (側福晉) of the Borjigin clan (孛兒只斤氏)
- Mistress (庶福晉) of the Esaili clan (額賽禮氏)
  - Momei (墨美; 1652–1691), first son
  - Mujina (穆濟納; 1657–1660), fourth son
- Mistress (庶福晉) of the Hang clan (杭氏)
  - Labu (喇布), Prince Jian of the First Rank (和碩簡親王; 1654–1682), second son
  - Yabu (雅布), Prince Jianxiu of the First Rank (簡修親王; 1658–1701), fifth son
- Mistress (庶福晉) of the Tong clan (佟氏)
