= Ledu (prince) =

Ledu (勒度, 11 March 1636 – 22 December 1655) was a Qing dynasty imperial prince, Jirgalang's third son and grandson of Nurhaci's third younger brother Šurhaci. He was a sole holder of the Prince Min of the Second Rank title from 1651 to his death in 1655. As the peerage was not given perpetual inheritability, his descendants would have held diminished titles vis-a-vis their predecessors. The peerage became extinct because of lack of a male heir.

== Life ==
Ledu was born in 1636 to secondary princess consort Zhengxian of the First Rank, lady Jarud Borjigit, daughter of lord Bage.

Ledu's ultimate political career started after the death of Dorgon in 1651. At that time, he was granted a title of Prince Min of the Second Rank, while his second elder half-brother was designated as heir apparent to Prince Zheng peerage. Ledu was appointed as one of the regents acting on behalf of the underage Shunzhi Emperor, together with Jirgalang, Duoni (Dodo's son and successor), Yolo (Abatai's son), Dulan (Sahaliyan's son), Shangshan (Feiyangwu's son) and Du'erhu (Cuyen's grandson).

Ledu died in 1655 without an heir and was posthumously honoured as Prince Minjian of the Second Rank (敏简郡王, meaning "clever and modest"). As Qing dynasty did not implement concrete rules of adoption into the peerages on the verge of extinction, there were any clansmen adopted as his successors.

== Family of Ledu ==
Ledu was married to lady Borjigit, daughter of taiji Mantu (满图).

- Primary consort, of the Khorchin Borjigin clan (嫡福晋 科尔沁博尔济吉特氏)
  敏郡王嫡福晋-->敏简郡王嫡福晋
