= Du Shoutian =

Qing dynasty politician

Imperial tutor Du Shoutian

Assistant Grand Secretary
- In office 11 July 1850 – 1 September 1852

Minister of Justice
- In office 28 June 1850 – 18 June 1851
- Preceded by: Chen Fu'en
- Succeeded by: Zhou Zupei

Minister of Works
- In office 23 January 1845 – 28 June 1850
- Preceded by: Chen Guanjun
- Succeeded by: Sun Ruizhen

Personal details
- Born: Du Shoutian; 1787 Binzhou, Shandong, China
- Died: 1 September 1852 (aged 64–65) Huai'an, Jiangsu, China
- Relations: Du Han (son), Du Qiao (son)
- Parent: Du E (father)
- Education: Jinshi degree in the Imperial Examination
- Occupation: politician
- Courtesy name: Zhinong (芝農)
- Posthumous name: Wenzheng (文正)

Du Shoutian (Chinese: 杜受田, 1787 – 1 September 1852), courtesy name Zhinong (芝農), was a Chinese statesman of the Qing dynasty.

Du Shoutian was the son of Du E (杜堮). He obtained the highest degree (jinshi) in the imperial examination and was selected a shujishi of the Hanlin Academy in 1823. Since 1835, Du served as tutor of Prince Yizhu, whom later enthroned as the Xianfeng Emperor.

It is said that Daoguang Emperor was undecided which of his sons, Yizhu or Yixin, should be made the inheritor. Once, Daoguang took the princes to Nanyuan (南苑) for a hunting competition. Du told Yizhu beforehand not to kill any animals, and if the emperor ask why, he was to answer that spring was the season when all life was meant to thrive, so he had no heart to terminate them. Yizhu did so. Although Yixin caught the most fowls, Daoguang was very satisfied with Yizhu's answer and praised that Yizhu had the magnanimity of an emperor.

In 1850, Daoguang Emperor was seriously ill and decided to have a conversation with Yizhu and Yixin. Du Shoutian believed that Yizhu would certainly be worse than Yixin in terms of knowledge of the current politics, so the only way was to cry without a word. Daoguang was deeply moved and finally decided to let Yizhu inherit the throne.

After Xianfeng Emperor ascended the throne, Du was granted the honorary title of "Crown Prince's Grand Tutor" (太子太傅) and the Minister of Personnel. Later, he had served as Minister of Justice and Assistant Grand Secretary. When the Taiping Rebellion broke out in Guangxi, Du recommended Lin Zexu and Zhou Tianjue (周天爵) to Emperor Xianfeng as suitable candidates to suppress the rebellion, Xianfeng adopted his advice. In 1852, he and Yiliang (怡良) were sent to northern Jiangsu to inspect a flooded area and to report on relief measures. He fell ill on the way and later died in Huai'an. Xianfeng was devastated and felt that Du's expectations of emperor all vanished with his passing.

Du Shoutian given the posthumous name Wenzheng (文正) and awarded posthumous appointment of Grand Preceptor (太師) by Xianfeng Emperor.

In 1861, His eldest son, Du Han (杜翰), was appointed as one of the eight regents to aid the young successor Zaichun, who was later enthroned as the Tongzhi Emperor. The eight regents were removed from power in a coup. As the son of Du Shoutian, Du Han was spared the death penalty, dismissed from the official post and exiled to Xinjiang.
