= Amin (Qing dynasty) =

Manchu noble of the early Qing Dynasty

Personal details
- Born: 1585
- Died: 28 December 1640 (aged 54–55)
- Parent: Šurhaci (father)

Amin (Manchu:; Chinese: 阿敏, 1585- Dec. 28, 1640) was a Manchu noble and an important military and political leader in the early years of the Qing dynasty.

He was the second son of Nurhaci's younger brother Šurhaci of the Aisin Gioro clan.

== Biography ==
=== Nurhaci's reign ===
In 1608, and again in 1613, he played an important part in Nurhaci's campaign against the tribes of the Hūlun alliance, namely against Bujantai and the Ula tribe. At first he held the rank of a taiji (Mongol rank of a minor prince). In 1616 when Nurhaci assumed the title of Khan, Amin was named as one of the Four Senior Beile to assist in the administration. In terms of seniority he held the rank of Second Beile, and was given command of the Bordered Blue Banner. He took part in 1619 in the Battle of Sarhū against the expeditionary force sent by the Ming Court under Yang Hao. In 1621 he fought bravely during the taking of Shenyang and Liaoyang and was of the commanders of the expedition which drove Mao Wenlong from Korea. In 1626, after the death of Nurhaci and the succession of the Fourth Beile, Hong Taiji as khan, Amin and the other two Senior Beile, Daišan and Manggūltai, ruled jointly with Hong Taiji.

=== Hong Taiji's reign ===
In 1627 Amin was in command of the expedition to Korea and was successful in forcing the king of Korea to sue for peace. His aim in subjugating Korea was probably to make himself ruler of that country, but he was opposed by the other princes who had been sent as his assistants, including his own brother, Jirgalang, and his nephews, Dudu and Yoto. When these princes signed separately a treaty with the Korean king, Amin was so angry that he set his troops in Pyongyang free for three days of pillaging.

In 1629, when Hong Taiji invaded China, Amin was left at Mukden as regent. After Hong Taiji returned to Mukden in April 1630 Amin was sent to Yongping to guard the four cities that had been recently conquered. Amin arrived at Yongping on May 6, but soon the Ming troops counter-attacked and defeated the Manchus in several battles. On June 22, when the Ming troops were approaching Yongping, before fleeing the city with his troops, Amin disobeyed the orders of Hong Taiji by plundering and massacring the population of Yongping. Upon his arrival at Mukden in July 1630, Amin was arrested and tried for fleeing from his post, disobeying orders, for not having confronted the enemy in a single engagement, for losing many of his troops, and for other misdemeanors. A council of princes and high officials condemned him to death on sixteen counts, but Hong Taiji intervened and commuted his sentence to incarceration. Amin died in prison in 1640.

=== Legacy ===
The fall of Amin cleared the way for Hong Taiji to consolidate his power over the other Manchu princes (the Four Senior Beile). The Bordered Blue Banner which was under Amin's control was given to his younger brother, Jirgalang, a devoted follower of Hong Taiji. From this it is clear that Hong Taiji was still fearful of radically altering the Banner arrangements which his father had designated. However the elimination of Amin as one of the Four Senior Beile made it easier for Hong Taiji to reduce the power of Manggūltai in 1631 and to appropriate for himself the latter's Plain Blue Banner.

== Family ==
Consorts and issue:

- Primary Consort, of the Hoifa Nara clan (娶福晉 輝發那拉氏), daughter of beile Taishi (台诗)
  - Hongketai (宏科泰), 1st son
  - Ai'erli, Defender Duke by Grace (镇国公 爱尔礼), 2nd son
  - Gu'ermahun, Prince Wenjian of the Fourth Rank (温简贝子 固尔玛浑), 3rd son
- Second primary Consort, of the Hoifa Nara clan(娶福晉 輝發那拉氏), daughter of beile Baindari
- Third Primary Consort, of the Nara clan (娶福晉 那拉氏), daughter of Ezhu (额诸)
- Fourth Primary Consort, of the Jarud Borjigin clan (扎鲁特博尔济吉特氏), daughter of beile Heshuoqi (和硕齐)
  - Gong'a, Defender Duke by Grace (镇国公 恭阿), 4th son
  - Guogai, Defender Duke by Grace Duanchun (端纯镇国公 果盖), 5th son
  - Guolai, Defender Duke by Grace (镇国公 果赖), 6th son
- Fifth Primary Consort, of the Barin Borjigin clan (娶福晉巴林博尔济吉特氏), daughter of beile Seteli (塞特里)
- Unknown
  - Third Daughter
    - Married Sodnom Dügüreng (索諾木杜棱; d. 1644) of the Aohan Borjigin after 1636

== Literature ==
- Kennedy, George A. (1943). "Amin" . In Hummel, Arthur W. Sr. (ed.). Eminent Chinese of the Ch'ing Period. United States Government Printing Office.
