= Şüşün =

- Municipality
- Location within Azerbaijan
- Coordinates: 40°08′33″N 48°00′36″E
- Country: Azerbaijan
- Rayon: Kurdamir
- Time zone: UTC+4 (AZT)
  - Summer (DST): UTC+5 (AZT)

Şüşün (also, Shushun) is a village and municipality in the Kurdamir Rayon of Azerbaijan.
