= Later Jin invasion of Joseon =

1627 invasion of Korea by Jurchens

- Part of Korean–Jurchen conflicts, Ming-Qing transition
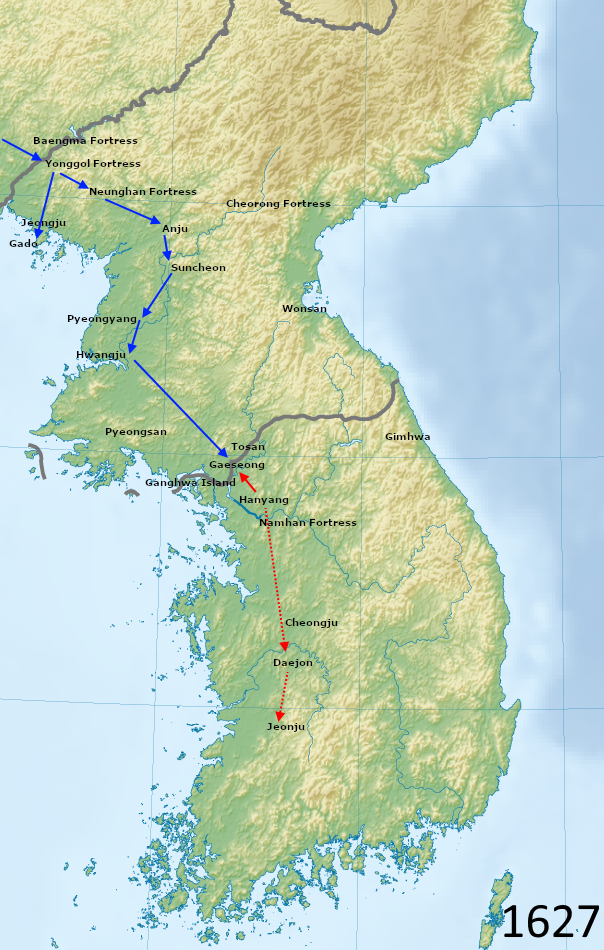
Date	January – 3 March 1627
Location	Northern Korean Peninsula
Result	Later Jin victory

Belligerents
Joseon; Ming dynasty	Later Jin

Commanders and leaders
Joseon Kingdom: Jeong Bong-su; Yi Rip; Jang Man; Kim Sang-yong; Ming dynasty: Mao Wenlong	Amin; Jirgalang; Ajige; Yoto; Li Yongfang; Gang Hong-rip

Strength
50,000	30,000

Casualties and losses
10,000	3,000

- Later Jin invasion of Joseon
- Hangul: 정묘호란
- Hanja: 丁卯胡亂
- RR: Jeongmyohoran
- MR: Chŏngmyohoran

The Later Jin invasion of Joseon occurred in early 1627 when the Later Jin prince Amin led an invasion of the Joseon Kingdom. The war ended after three months, with the Later Jin establishing itself as sovereign tributary overlord over Joseon. However Joseon continued its relationship with the Ming and showed defiance in solidifying its tributary relationship with the Later Jin. It was followed by the Qing invasion of Joseon in 1636.

== Background ==
In 1619, the kingdom of Joseon had sent 10,069 musketeers and 3,000 archers to aid the Ming dynasty in attacking the Later Jin, which culminated in an allied defeat at the Battle of Sarhū. The Joseon general Gang Hong-rip surrendered with his remaining forces and insisted that Joseon did not hold anything against the Jurchens, having only sent reinforcements to repay an obligation to the Ming.

In 1623, a faction at the Joseon court known as the Westerners deposed King Gwanghaegun (Hangul: 광해군, Hanja: 光海君) and installed Injo as king. The following year, Yi Gwal rebelled against King Injo, but failed to oust him, and the rebellion was crushed. Its survivors fled to the Jin court, where they recommended Hong Taiji to invade Joseon. General Gang Hong-rip was also led to believe by the survivors that his family had died in the attempted coup, so he pushed for such an invasion out of a desire for revenge.

Meanwhile, the Westerners took on an explicitly pro-Ming and anti-Jurchen stance in their relations with the two states. Injo severed relations with the Later Jin on the advice of his advisers. The Ming general Mao Wenlong's army of 26,000 men engaged in raids against the Jurchens from an island base off the Korean peninsula. The Westerners aided him by allowing him to station his troops in Uiju.

The Later Jin had lost at the Battle of Ningyuan the previous year, and their Khan, Nurhaci, died from his wounds afterwards. Peace negotiations with the Ming after the battle delayed an aggressive Ming response to the Jurchen loss, and the Ming general Yuan Chonghuan was busy fortifying the border garrisons and training new musketeers. The new Khan, Hong Taiji, was eager for a quick victory to consolidate his position. By invading Joseon, he also hoped to extract much needed resources for his army and subjects, who had suffered in the war against the Ming.

== War ==
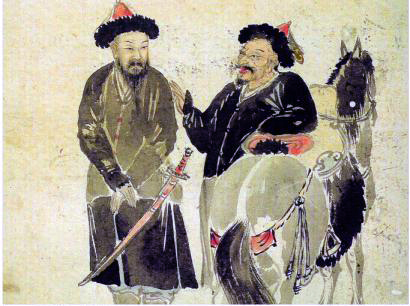
A Korean painting depicting two Jurchen warriors and their horses

In 1627, Hong Taiji dispatched Amin, Jirgalang, Ajige, and Yoto to Joseon with 30,000 troops under the leadership of Gang Hong-rip and Li Yongfang. The Jurchens met sharp resistance at the border towns, but Joseon border garrisons were quickly defeated. On 14 January, the Jurchen army advanced into Uiju, where Mao Wenlong was stationed, and Mao quickly fled with his men into the Bohai Sea. The Neunghan Fortress fell on the 21 January. Next the Jurchens attacked Anju. When it became clear that defeat was inevitable, the Anju garrisons committed suicide by blowing up their gunpowder storehouse. Pyongyang fell without a fight, and the Jin army crossed the Taedong River.

By this time, news of the invasion had reached the Ming court, which immediately dispatched a relief contingent to Joseon, slowing the Jurchen advance into Hwangju.

King Injo then dispatched an envoy to negotiate a peace treaty, but by the time the messenger returned, Injo had already fled from Hanseong (Seoul) to Ganghwa Island in panic.

Despite the Jin invasion's success, Amin was willing to negotiate a peace. The following settlement was agreed upon on Ganghwa Island:

1. Joseon abandons the Ming era name Tianqi (天啓).
2. Joseon offers Yi Gak as a hostage as a substitute for a royal prince.
3. The Later Jin and Joseon will not violate each other's territory.

While negotiations were taking place, the city of Pyongyang underwent several days of looting by the Jurchens before Amin was ordered by Hong Taji to sign the peace agreement. The Jin army then withdrew to Mukden, ending the three-month-long invasion.

== Aftermath ==
In the postwar negotiations, the Later Jin forced Joseon to open markets near the borders, because its conflicts with the Ming had brought economic hardship and starvation to Jin subjects. Joseon was also forced to transfer suzerainty of the Warka tribe to Jin. Furthermore, a tribute of 100 horses, 100 tiger and leopard skins, 400 bolts of cotton, and 15,000 pieces of cloth was to be extracted and gifted to the Jin Khan. Injo's brother was sent to deliver this tribute. However in later letters to the Joseon king, Hong Taiji would complain that the Koreans did not behave as if they had lost, and were not abiding by the terms of the agreement. Joseon merchants and markets continued to trade with the Ming and actively aided Ming subjects by providing them with grain and rations. Hong Taiji rebuked them, saying that the food of Joseon should only be fed to Joseon subjects.

The relationship between Joseon and the Later Jin remained uncomfortable and bleak. The invasion was bitterly resented by Joseon's statesmen and Confucian scholars, who believed that it was treacherous and unfilial for Joseon to abandon the Ming, considering the assistance it had provided against Japan in the past. This resentment was inflamed in 1636 when the Manchus demanded the changing of the terms of diplomatic relationship from equality to sovereign-vassal. The Joseon court, dominated by anti-Manchu hawks, rejected the demand. This led to the Qing invasion of Joseon in 1636.

The Ming general Yuan Chonghuan was impeached for having been duped by the Jin into entering peace negotiations, and court officials accused him of lack of agency. This was the last time the Ming would openly engage in peace negotiations with the Jurchens.

Mao Wenlong was reported to the Ming authorities by Joseon for cowardice and treachery. Mao began acting independently and minted his own coins in 1628, while conducting illicit trading in contravention of Ming law. He was caught by Yuan Chonghuan in 1629 and executed for smuggling on 24 July 1629. Yuan reported the death of Mao Wenlong to the Joseon court, stating that it had been done to "properly establish the emperor's awesomeness." Prior to his execution, Yuan Chonghuan addressed him thus:

You were given the authority of a general. But now you, Mao Wenlong, have treacherously raised yourself to the level of a lord, amassed soldiers, siphoned off rations, slaughtered the refugees of Liaodong, despoiled Korea, harassed Denglai, carried out illicit commerce, looted and plundered commoners' boats, changed people's names, and violated the people's sons and daughters. These are the crimes for which you will be put to death.

— Yuan Chonghuan

== See also ==
- History of Korea
- Korean-Jurchen wars

== Bibliography ==
- Kang, Hyeok Hweon (2013), "Big Heads and Buddhist Demons: The Korean Musketry Revolution and the Northern Expeditions of 1654 and 1658" (PDF), Journal of Chinese Military History, 2: 151, archived from the original (PDF) on 2020-10-02
- Swope, Kenneth (2014), The Military Collapse of China's Ming Dynasty, Routledge
- Wakeman, Frederic (1985), The Great Enterprise: The Manchu Reconstruction of Imperial Order in Seventeenth-Century China, vol. 1, University of California Press

=== Further reading ===
- Hyŏn-hŭi Yi; Sŏng-su Pak; Nae-hyŏn Yun (2005). New history of Korea. Jimoondang
