= Šurhaci =

Jurchen leader

Prince Zhuang of the First Rank
- Succeeded by: Šose

Personal details
- Born: 1564 China
- Died: 25 September 1611 (aged 46–47) China
- Spouse: Lady Tunggiya
- Children: Amin
- Parents: Taksi (father); Empress Xuan (mother)

Šurhaci (Manchu: ᡧᡠᡵᡤᠠᠴᡳ, Möllendorff: šurgaci, Abkai: xurgaqi; Chinese: 舒爾哈齊; 1564 – 25 September 1611), was a Jurchen leader, a member of the Aisin Gioro clan, he was a younger brother of Nurhaci, the founder of the Later Jin dynasty, the predecessor of the Qing dynasty. Under the Ming dynasty government, he held the title of local chieftain (都指揮) in the Jianzhou district, and maintained relations with the Ming authorities up to the beginning of 1607. In that year, he joined Nurhaci in the campaign against Bujantai and the Ula tribe, receiving the title of darhan baturu. However, as a result of disagreements with his brother over the conquest of the Hoifa and the killing of Hoifa's beile Baindari in 1607, he was put to death four years later at Nurhaci's order and buried in Dongjingling Township, Liaoyang. In 1653, he was posthumously given the rank of qinwang (first-rank prince) under the posthumous title Prince Zhuang of the First Rank.

== Physical appearance ==
According to the account of Korean ambassadors, Šurhaci was a tall, fat man with a pale-looking square face.

== Family ==
Primary Consort

- First primary consort, of the Tunggiya clan (嫡福晉 佟佳氏)
  - Altungga (阿爾通阿; 29 March 1580 – October/November 1609), first son
- Second primary consort, of the Hada Nara clan (繼福晉 哈達那拉氏)
  - First daughter (30 September 1584 – April/May 1656), personal name Eshitai (額實泰)
    - Married Bujantai (1575–1618) of the Manchu Ula Nara clan in December 1598 or January 1599
- Third primary consort, of the Fuca clan (三娶福晉 富察氏; d. 1620)
  - Second daughter (1584 – December 1638 or January 1639), personal name E'enzhe (額恩哲)
    - Married Bujantai (1575–1618) of the Manchu Ula Nara clan in 1603
  - Amin, Prince of the Third Rank (貝勒 阿敏; 25 November 1586 – 28 December 1640), second son
  - Third daughter (b. 4 November 1588)
    - Married Namuxi (納穆錫) of the Manchu Tunggiya clan
- Fourth primary consort, of the Gūwalgiya clan (四娶福晉 瓜爾佳氏; d. 1623)
  - Jasahatu, Duke of the Second Rank (輔國公 扎薩克圖; 4 September 1589 – October/November 1609), third son
  - Princess of the Second Rank (和碩公主; 22 July 1590 – May/June 1649), personal name Sundai (蓀岱), fourth daughter
    - Married Enggeder (恩格德爾; d. 1636) of the Khalkha Borjigit clan in March/April 1617
  - Sixth daughter (b. 13 February 1595)
    - Married Moluohun (漠落渾) of the Manchu Nara clan in January/February 1614
  - Turan, Prince Kexi of the Third Rank (恪僖貝勒 圖倫; 25 September 1596 – 6 September 1614), fourth son
  - Seventh daughter (b. 18 September 1597)
    - Married Chuoheluo (綽和絡) of the Manchu Wanyan clan in July 1609
  - Jaisanggū, Prince Hehui of the Third Rank (和惠貝勒 寨桑武' 12 August 1598 – 3 July 1625), fifth son
  - Nuomudai (諾穆岱; 2 August 1601 – 30 July 1613), seventh son
  - Eighth daughter (b. 1602)
    - Married Badana (巴達納) of the Manchu Nara clan in August/September 1616
  - Ninth daughter
  - Tenth daughter (b. 17 December 1603)
    - Married Babai (巴拜) of the Mongol Borjigit clan in August/September 1622
- Fifth primary consort, of the Ula Nara clan (五娶福晉 烏喇那拉氏), personal name Hunai (滹奈)
  - Jirgalang, Prince Zhengxian of the First Rank (鄭獻親王 濟爾哈朗; 19 November 1599 – 11 June 1655), sixth son
- Sixth primary consort, of the Nara clan (六娶福晉 那拉氏)
- Seventh primary consort, of the Gūwalgiya clan (七娶福晉 瓜爾佳氏)
  - Fiyanggū, Prince Jianjingding of the First Rank (簡靖定親王 費揚武; 17 May 1605 – 11 January 1644), eighth son
- Eighth primary consort, of the Hoifa Nara clan (八娶福晉 輝發那拉氏)
- Ninth primary consort, of the Sirin Gioro clan (九娶福晉 西林覺羅氏)

Concubine

- Concubine, of the Donggo clan (格格 董鄂氏)
  - Fifth daughter (b. 18 March 1593)
    - Married Gumubei (固穆貝) of the Manchu Donggo clan in February/March 1606
- Concubine, of the Ayan Gioro clan (格格 阿顏覺羅氏)
  - Naodai (瑙岱; b. 1608), ninth son
  - 11th daughter (b. 23 June 1608)
    - Married Kudena (庫德納) of the Manchu Lala (拉喇) clan in March/April 1623
  - 12th daughter (b. 25 March 1610)
    - Married Muwuna (穆扤納) of the Manchu Nara clan in January/February 1623

== Ancestry ==
Sibeoci Fiyanggū
Fuman
Giocangga (1526–1583)
Douliji
Empress Zhi
Taksi (1543–1583)
Empress Yi
Šurhaci (1564–1611)
Douliji
Cancha
Agu
Empress Xuan (d. 1569)
