= Bujantai =

Bujuntai 布占泰

Beile of the Ula Nara
- Reign: 1596 - 1613
- Predecessor: Mantai
- Successor: Title extinct
- Born: 1575
- Died: 1618 (age 44)
- Burial: Yehe State
- Spouse: Aisin-Gioro Eshitai; Aisin Gioro E'enzhe; Princess Mukushen
- Issue: Dalamu; Mordaja; Lady Ulanara others
- House: Ula Nara
- Father: Bugan (布干)

Bujantai (Manchu:; Chinese: 布占泰) (1575 – 1618) was a Jurchen beile (chieftain) of the Ula tribal confederation.

== Life ==
Bujantai was descended from Nacibulu (納奇卜祿), the ancestor of the Nara lineages of Ula and Hada. Tradition spoke of Nacibulu as having attracted the attention of some Mongols who desired to make him subservient to them. When the Mongols attempted to capture him, however, he successfully subdued them, and when they shouted to inquire his name he responded with a defiant challenge, "Nara". In this manner the important Nara clan is supposed to have received its name. Nacibulu settled near modern Jilin on the Sungari river, which was often called simply the Ula, or "the river". There he became a successful hunter and trapper who attracted many followers. Several generations later, two brothers among his descendants, Kesina (克什納) and Gudui Juyan (古對珠延), became the ancestors of the Hada and Ula branches of the Nara clan. Buyan (布延), grandson of Gudui juyan, fortified the settlement on the Sungari and named himself beile of the Ula tribe. Two of his grandsons were Mantai (滿泰) and Bujantai, both of whom would succeed to the position of beile of the Ula.

The Yehe tribe under the beile Bujai (布齋,布戒) and Narimbulu assembled the various groups in the Hūlun alliance, along with some Khorchin Mongols, to oppose the rising power of Nurhaci. Bujantai led the Ula contingent, but was taken prisoner by Nurhaci when the confederation was defeated at Mt. Gure in October 1593. Nurhaci refrained from killing Bujantai and after holding him for three years as a retainer sent him back under escort to the Ula. The Ula beile Mantai, and his son having recently been executed by their tribesmen, Bujantai was released by Nurhaci, established as beile in his brother's place and as tributary to the lord of the Jianzhou, Nurhaci. In order to cement ties with Nurhaci, he sent a sister as wife to Nurhaci's brother, Šurhaci, and in 1597 joined the Yehe and other tribes in a formal truce with Nurhaci. Two years Bujantai would receive a daughter of Šurhaci as a wife, and in 1601 he arranged the marriage of his niece, the future Empress Xiao Lie Wu to Nurhaci. Two years later after unsuccessful attempts to secure a daughter of the Mongol, Minggan 明安, chief of the Borjigit tribe, he requested another wife from Nurhaci and was given a second daughter of Šurhaci.

Even though these matrimonial ties existed between the Ula and Nurhaci, a war broke out in 1607 between Nurhaci and the Ula in which the latter were defeated with the loss of some towns. Bujantai then promised Nurhaci that if he was given another wife then a truce would be called for. Nurhaci then sent one of his own daughters to him and this would secured a peace between the two for four years. In 1612 Bujantai tried to bribe the Yehe beile, Bujai, into giving him for a wife a daughter who had been promised to Nurhaci. He also subjected Nurhaci's daughter whom he had married to indignity by "shooting whistling arrows at her". Enraged by these acts, Nurhaci took personal command of an expedition which completely defeated the Ula tribe in 1613. Bujantai fled to the Yehe under the beile Gintaisi who gave him refuge. He died before the Yehe tribe also fell into Nurhaci's hands.

== Family ==
- Father: Bugan (布干)

Consorts and issues:

- Wife, of the Aisin Gioro clan (愛新覺羅氏; 30 September 1584 – April/May 1656), personal name Eshitai (額實泰), daughter of Surhaci
- Wife, of the Aisin Gioro clan (愛新覺羅氏; 1584 – December 1638/January 1639), personal name E'enzhe (額恩哲), daughter of Surhaci
- Wife, of the Aisin Gioro clan (愛新覺羅氏; 1595 – June/July 1659), personal name Mukushen (穆庫什), daughter of Nurhaci
  - Mordaja (茂墨尔)
  - Gaduhun (噶都浑)
  - Hongkuang (洪匡)
- Unknown:
  - Dalamu (達拉穆), first son
  - Seven sons
  - Lady Ulanara (葉赫那拉氏)
    - married Dudu, Prince Anping of the Third Rank of the Aisin Gioro clan (安平貝勒 杜度), the first son of Cuyen and had issue (6 sons and 1 daughter)
  - Lady Ulanara (葉赫那拉氏)
    - married Šoto, Prince of the Third Rank (貝勒 碩託), son of Daišan (貝勒 碩託; d. 1643)
  - Ulanara Jihai (乌拉那拉氏·济海; d. 30 September 1643)
    - married Sahaliyan, Prince Yingyi of the First Rank (穎毅親王 薩哈璘) of the Aisin Gioro clan, son of Daišan

Bujantai Ula Nara Born: ? Died: 1618
Regnal titles
Preceded by Mantai	Beile of the Ula Nara; 1596–1613	Extinct
