= Xinyou Coup =

1861 coup in Qing China by Empress Dowagers Cixi and Ci'an and Prince Gong

- Part of Taiping Rebellion
- Date: 2 November 1861
- Location: Peking, Qing China
- Caused by: Death of Xianfeng Emperor
- Result: Tongzhi Restoration

Lead figures
Empress Dowager Cixi, Empress Dowager Ci'an, Yixin, Zeng Guofan	Eight regents: Zaiyuan, Duanhua, Jingshou, Sushun, Muyin, Kuang Yuan, Du Han, and Jiao Youying

Xinyou Coup (simplified Chinese: 辛酉政变; traditional Chinese: 辛酉政變; pinyin: Xīnyǒu Zhèngbiàn), also known as the Qixiang Coup (祺祥政變 or 祺祥之變) and Beijing Coup (北京政變), was a Chinese palace coup that occurred on 2 November 1861 during the Qing dynasty. It was instigated by Empress Dowagers Cixi and Ci'an, along with Yixin to seize power after the death of the Xianfeng Emperor. On his deathbed, the emperor had appointed a group of eight regents, led by Sushun, who were adjutants general and grand councillors, to assist his infant son Zaichun (Tongzhi Emperor) in governing the empire. The eight regents, Sushun, Zaiyuan, Duanhua, Jingshou (景壽), Muyin, Kuang Yuan (匡源), Du Han (杜翰) and Jiao Youying (焦祐瀛) were stripped of official positions. Later, several of them were executed or forced to commit suicide.

== Background ==
Empress Dowager Ci'an, Cixi's co-regent who staged the Xinyou Coup with her.

While most of the royal family fled the Western occupation of Peking in the Second Opium War, Prince Gong remained in the city to deal with the crisis. He would gain respect from the Westerners as a result of his conduct.

By the time of the death of the Xianfeng Emperor, Empress Dowager Cixi had become a shrewd political strategist. In Rehe Province, while waiting for an astrologically favourable time to transport the emperor's coffin back to Beijing, Cixi conspired with court officials and imperial relatives to seize power. Cixi's position as the lower-ranked empress dowager had no intrinsic political power attached to it. In addition, her son, the young emperor, was not a political force himself. As a result, it became necessary for her to ally herself with other powerful figures, including the late emperor's principal wife, Empress Dowager Ci'an. Cixi suggested that they become co-reigning empress dowagers, with powers exceeding the eight regents; the two had long been close friends since Cixi first came to the imperial household.

Tensions grew between the two Empresses Dowager and the eight regents, who were led by Sushun. The regents did not appreciate Cixi's interference in political affairs, and their frequent confrontations with the Empresses Dowager left Empress Dowager Ci'an frustrated. Ci'an often refused to come to court audiences, leaving Cixi to deal with the ministers alone. Secretly, Cixi had begun gathering the support of talented ministers, soldiers, and others who were ostracized by the eight regents for personal or political reasons. Among them was Prince Gong, who had been excluded from power, yet harboured great ambitions, and Prince Chun, the sixth and seventh brothers of the Xianfeng Emperor, respectively. While Cixi aligned herself with the two princes, a memorial came from Shandong asking for her to "listen to politics behind the curtains," i.e., to assume power as de facto ruler. The same memorial also asked Prince Gong to enter the political arena as a principal "aide to the Emperor".

When the Xianfeng Emperor's funeral procession left for Beijing, Cixi took advantage of her alliances with Princes Gong and Chun. She and the boy emperor returned to the capital before the rest of the party, along with Zaiyuan and Duanhua, two of the eight regents, while Sushun was left to accompany the deceased emperor's procession. Cixi's early return to Beijing meant that she had more time to plan with Prince Gong and ensure that the power base of the eight regents was divided between Sushun and his allies, Zaiyuan and Duanhua. In order to remove them from power, history was rewritten: the regents were dismissed for having carried out incompetent negotiations with the "barbarians" that had caused the Xianfeng Emperor to flee to Rehe Province "greatly against his will", among other charges.

To display her high moral standards, Cixi executed only three of the eight regents. The verdict of the other five regents was: Jingshou, retained his honorary title efu (額駙) and banned from participating in political activities; Muyin, forced to serve at frontier military outposts in Xinjiang (軍臺效力); Kuang Yuan, Du Han and Jiao Youying, stripped of official positions.

Prince Gong had suggested that Sushun, Zaiyuan and Duanhua be executed by the most painful method, known as slow slicing ("death by a thousand cuts"), but Cixi declined the suggestion and ordered that Sushun be beheaded, while the other two also marked for execution, Zaiyuan and Duanhua, were given pieces of white silk for them to hang themselves with. In addition, Cixi refused outright the idea of executing the family members of the regents, as would be done in accordance with imperial tradition of an alleged usurper. Ironically, Qing imperial tradition also dictated that women and princes were never to engage in politics. In breaking with tradition, Cixi became the only empress dowager in the Qing dynasty to rule from "behind the curtains", a practice known as chuí lián tīng zhèng (垂簾聽政) in Chinese.
