= Prince Zheng =

Qing dynasty noble title

Prince Zheng of the First Rank
- Traditional Chinese: 和碩鄭親王
- Simplified Chinese: 和硕郑亲王
Transcriptions
Standard Mandarin
- Hanyu Pinyin: héshuò zhèng qīnwáng
- Wade–Giles: ho-shuo cheng ch'in-wang

Prince Jian of the First Rank
- Traditional Chinese: 和碩簡親王
- Simplified Chinese: 和硕简亲王
Transcriptions
Standard Mandarin
- Hanyu Pinyin: héshuò jiǎn qīnwáng
- Wade–Giles: ho-shuo chien ch'in-wang

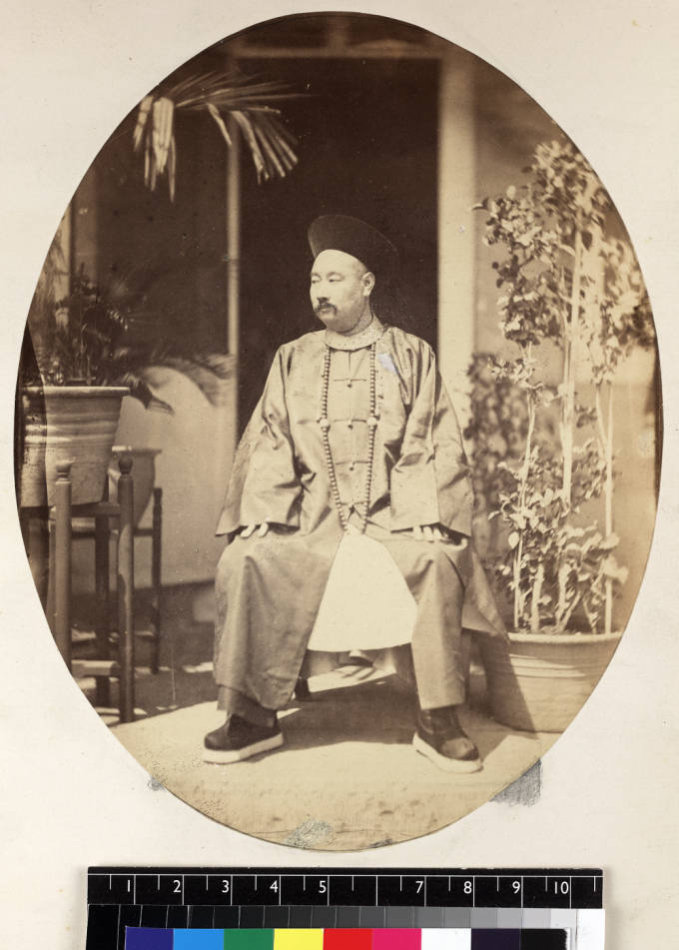

Prince Zheng of the First Rank (Manchu: ᡥᠣᡧᠣᡳ
ᡠᠵᡝᠨ
ᠴᡳᠨ ᠸᠠᠩ; hošoi ujen cin wang), or simply Prince Zheng, was the title of a princely peerage used in China during the Manchu-led Qing dynasty (1644–1912). It was also one of the 12 "iron-cap" princely peerages in the Qing dynasty, which meant that the title could be passed down without being downgraded.

The first bearer of the title was Jirgalang (1599–1655), the sixth son of Šurhaci. He was awarded the title in 1636 by his cousin, Huangtaiji, the son and successor of Nurhaci (the founder of the Qing dynasty). When the title was passed down to Jirgalang's son, Jidu (1633–1660), it was renamed to Prince Jian of the First Rank (or simply Prince Jian) and given "iron-cap" status. The title was restored to its original name, "Prince Zheng of the First Rank", during the reign of the Qianlong Emperor (r. 1735–1796). The title was passed down over ten generations, and held by eight princes as Prince Zheng and nine princes as Prince Jian.

== Members of the Prince Zheng / Prince Jian peerage ==
Members of the Prince Zheng / Prince Jian peerage
- Jirgalang (1599–1655), Šurhaci's sixth son, held the title Prince Zheng of the First Rank from 1636 to 1655, posthumously honoured as Prince Zhengxian of the First Rank (鄭獻親王)
  - Jidu (濟度; 1633–1660), Jirgalang's second son, held the title Prince Jian of the First Rank from 1657 to 1660, posthumously honoured as Prince Jianchun of the First Rank (簡純親王)
    - Desai (德塞; 1654–1670), Jidu's third son, held the title Prince Jian of the First Rank from 1661 to 1670, posthumously honoured as Prince Jianhui of the First Rank (簡惠親王)
    - Labu (喇布; 1654–1681), Jidu's second son, held the title Prince Jian of the First Rank from 1670 to 1681, posthumously stripped of his title in 1682
    - Yabu (雅布; 1658–1701), Jidu's fifth son, held the title Prince Jian of the First Rank from 1683 to 1701, posthumously honoured as Prince Jianxiu of the First Rank (簡修親王)
      - Ya'erjiang'a (雅爾江阿; 1658–1732), Yabu's eldest son, held the title Prince Jian of the First Rank from 1703 to 1726, stripped of his title in 1726
      - Shenbaozhu (神保住; 1696–1759), Yabu's 14th son, held the title Prince Jian of the First Rank from 1726 to 1748, stripped of his title in 1748
      - Depei (德沛; 1688–1752), Fucun's son, held the title Prince Jian of the First Rank from 1748 to 1752, posthumously honoured as Prince Jianyi of the First Rank (簡儀親王)
      - Qitong'a (奇通阿; 1701–1763), Basai's son, held the title Prince Jian of the First Rank from 1752 to 1763, posthumously honoured as Prince Jianqin of the First Rank (簡勤親王)
        - Fengnaheng (豐訥亨; 1723–1775), Qitong'a's son, held the title Prince Jian of the First Rank from 1763 to 1775, posthumously honoured as Prince Jianke of the First Rank (簡恪親王)
          - Jihana (積哈納; 1758–1794), Fengnaheng's son, held the title Prince Zheng of the First Rank from 1776 to 1794, posthumously honoured as Prince Zhenggong of the First Rank (鄭恭親王)
            - Ulgungga (烏爾恭阿; 1778–1846), Jihana's son, held the title Prince Zheng of the First Rank from 1794 to 1846, posthumously honoured as Prince Zhengshen of the First Rank (鄭慎親王)
              - Duanhua (1807–1861), Ulgungga's third son, held the title Prince Zheng of the First Rank from 1846 to 1861, stripped of his title in 1861
                - Yueling (岳齡; 1849–1866), Yuyang's son and Baoyi's adoptive son, held the title of a buru bafen fuguo gong from 1862 to 1864
              - Chengzhi (承志; 1843–1882), Xilang'a's son, held the title Prince Zheng of the First Rank from 1864 to 1871, stripped of his title in 1871
              - Qingzhi (慶至; 1814–1878), Airen's son and Songde's adoptive son, held the title Prince Zheng of the First Rank from 1871 to 1878, posthumously honoured as Prince Zhengshun of the First Rank (鄭順親王)
                - Kaitai (凱泰; 1871–1900), Qingzhi's son, held the title Prince Zheng of the First Rank from 1878 to 1900, posthumously honoured as Prince Zhengke of the First Rank (鄭恪親王)
                  - Zhaoxu (照煦; 1900–1950), Kaitai's son, held the title Prince Zheng of the First Rank from 1902 to 1912

== Family tree ==
Family of Prince Zheng

Taksi 塔克世 (died 1583)	Lady Hitara 喜塔臘氏 (died 1569)
Nurhaci 努爾哈赤 (1559–1626)	Šurhaci 舒爾哈齊 (1564–1611); Prince Zhuang 莊親王 (posthumously awarded)
Huangtaiji 皇太極 (1592–1643)	Jirgalang 濟爾哈朗 (1599–1655); Prince Zhengxian 鄭獻親王 (1636–1655)	Fiyanggū 費揚武 (1605–1643); Prince Jianjingding 簡靖定親王 (posthumously awarded)
Qing dynasty emperors	Jidu 濟度 (1633–1660); Prince Jianchun 簡純親王 (1657–1660)	Ba'erkan 巴爾堪 (1637–1680); Prince Jianwu 簡武親王 (posthumously awarded)	Liuxi 留錫 (1648–1703)	Fulata 傅喇塔 (1625–1676); Prince Jianhuixian 簡惠獻親王 (posthumously awarded)
Labu 喇布 (1654–1681); Prince Jian 簡親王 (1670–1681) (posthumously stripped of his title)	Desai 德塞 (1654–1670); Prince Jianhui 簡惠親王 (1661–1670)	Yabu 雅布 (1658–1701); Prince Jianxiu 簡修親王 (1683–1701)	Basai 巴賽 (1663–1731); Prince Jian 簡親王 (posthumously awarded)	Selu 穡魯 (1684–1741)	Fucun 福存 (1665–1700); Prince Jian 簡親王 (posthumously awarded)
Ya'erjiang'a 雅爾江阿 (1677–1732); Prince Jian 簡親王 (1703–1726) (stripped of his title)	Azhalan 阿扎蘭 (1683–1717); Fuguo Jiangjun 輔國將軍 (stripped of his title)	Shenbaozhu 神保住 (1696–1759); Prince Jian 簡親王 (1726–1748) (stripped of his title)	Qitong'a 奇通阿 (1701–1763); Prince Jianqin 簡勤親王 (1752–1763)	Fangxiang 芳祥 (1718–1784)	Depei 德沛 (1688–1752); Prince Jianyi 簡儀親王 (1748–1752)
Dechong 德沖 (1714–1745)	Fengnaheng 豐訥亨 (1723–1775); Prince Jianke 簡恪親王 (1763–1775)	Jingnaheng 經訥亨 (1743–1775); Prince Zheng 鄭親王 (posthumously awarded)	Daoyi 導義 (1745–1786)
Guangheng 廣亨 (1740–1769)	Guangming 廣銘 (1738–1806)	Jihana 積哈納 (1758–1794); Prince Zhenggong 鄭恭親王 (1776–1794)	Yimiyang'a 伊彌揚阿 (1775–1818)	Yifeng'e 伊豐額 (1770–1821); Prince Zheng 鄭親王 (posthumously awarded)	Luchong 祿崇 (1781–1840)
Xingnian 興年 (1777–1834)	Ulgungga 烏爾恭阿 (1778–1846); Prince Zhengshen 鄭慎親王 (1794–1846)	Airen 愛仁 (1783–1827); Third Class Fuguo Jiangjun 三等輔國將軍	Songde 松德 (1800–1822); Prince Zheng 鄭親王 (posthumously awarded)	Xilang'a 西朗阿 (1798–1848); Prince Zheng 鄭親王 (posthumously awarded)	Jingli 景麗 (1810–1851)
Yuyang 毓楊 (1813–1861)	Duanhua 端華 (1807–1861); Prince Zheng 鄭親王 (1846–1861) (stripped of his title)	Sushun 肅順 (1816–1861); Third Class Fuguo Jiangjun 三等輔國將軍 (stripped of his title)	Qingzhi 慶至 (1814–1878); Prince Zhengshun 鄭順親王 (1871–1878)	Chengzhi 承志 (1843–1882); Prince Zheng 鄭親王 (1864–1871) (stripped of his title)	Baoyi 保彝 (1836–1838)
Yueling 岳齡 (1849–1866); Buru Bafen Fuguo Gong 不入八分輔國公 (1862–1864)	Kaitai 凱泰 (1871–1900); Prince Zhengke 鄭恪親王 (1878–1900)
Zhaoxu 照煦 (1900–1950); Prince Zheng 鄭親王 (1902–1912)

Legend:

adoption

== See also ==
- Royal and noble ranks of the Qing dynasty
