= Manggūltai =

Manchu military leader (b. 1587, d. 1633)

- Prince of the Third Rank
- Born: 1587
- Died: 11 January 1633 (aged 45–46)
Names
- Aisin Gioro Manggūltai (愛新覺羅 莽古爾泰)
- Father: Nurhaci
- Mother: Fuca Gundei

Manggūltai
- Chinese: 莽古爾泰
Transcriptions
Standard Mandarin
- Hanyu Pinyin: Mǎng Gǔěrtài
- Wade–Giles: Mang Gu-erh-t'ai

Manggūltai (Manchu: ᠮᠠᠩᡤᡡᠯᡨᠠᡳ, Möllendorff: Manggūltai, Abkai: Manggvltai; Chinese: 莽古爾泰; 1587 – 11 January 1633) was a Manchu noble and an important military and political leader in the early years of the Qing dynasty. He helped Hong Taiji consolidate his power by handing over his Plain Blue Banner to Hong Taiji. He died when he was 45 to 46 years old in 1633.

== Family background ==
Manggūltai was born in the Manchu Aisin Gioro clan as the fifth son of Nurhaci, the founder of the Qing dynasty. His mother was one of Nurhaci's primary consorts, who was Gundei from the Fuca clan. He was an older half-brother of Nurhaci's successor, Hong Taiji.

== Career ==
=== Nurhaci's reign ===
When Nurhaci assumed the title of Khan in 1616, Manggūltai was named one of the Four Senior Beile, ranking as the third senior beile to assist Nurhaci's administration. The other three beiles were Daišan, Amin, and Hong Taiji. Starting in 1621, Manggūltai and the other three senior beiles served as assistants to Nurhaci on a monthly rotational basis in directing state affairs of the Later Jin dynasty.

=== Hong Taiji's reign ===
After Nurhaci's death, Daišan used his influence to make the princes and generals to agree on Hong Taiji's accession as Khan. Although Hong Taiji had become Khan, Manggūltai, along with Daišan and Amin continued to take turns as assistant administrators until 1629, when Hong Taiji had begun to consolidate power.

Manggūltai handed over the Plain Blue Banner to Hong Taiji, which was the third strongest banner at that time. In this way, Hong Taiji slowly lowered, if not eliminated, his other three senior beile's powers. Facing South as the sole ruler and full consolidation of power at his command. A precursor to Hong Taiji's rise and claim as Emperor of the new Qing Dynasty.

== Family ==
Primary Consort

- First wife, of the Nara clan (嫡福晉 那拉氏)
- Second wife, of the Hada Nara clan (繼妻 哈達那拉氏)
  - Maidali (邁達禮; 15 June 1603 – January/February 1634), first son
  - Guanggu (廣顧; 22 August 1604 – 1606), second son
  - Sahaliang (薩哈良; 21 March 1606 – 1642), third son
  - Ebilun (額弼綸; b. 4 February 1609), fifth son
  - Feiyanggutai (費揚古泰; b. 11 April 1610), sixth son
  - Aketama (阿克塔瑪; 1620–1622), eighth son
- Third wife, of an unknown clan (三娶妻)
  - Shusong (舒鬆; 3 January 1624 – 1652), ninth son

Concubine

- Concubine, of an unknown clan (妾)
  - Sadong'e (薩棟額; b. 1608), fourth son
  - Sahana (薩哈納; b. 11 April 1614), seventh son

== Ancestry ==
Fuman
Giocangga (1526–1583)
Empress Zhi
Taksi (1543–1583)
Empress Yi
Nurhaci (1559–1626)
Cancha
Agu
Empress Xuan (d. 1569)
Manggūltai (1587–1633)
Ahazhangjing
Gundei (d. 1620)
