= Baindari =

Jurchen chieftain of the Hoifa tribal confederation

Baindari (Manchu: ; Chinese: 拜音達里; pinyin: Bàiyīndálǐ) (died 1607) was a Jurchen beile (chieftain) of the Hoifa tribal confederation.

He was a member of the Nara clan although his ancestors were originally members of the Ikderi clan and belonged to the Nimaca tribe on the banks of the Amur river. Migrating southward, they put themselves under the protection of Nara clansmen. After slaying seven oxen in a sacrifice to Heaven, they exchanged their name for that of their protectors. Six generations later, Wangginu consolidated his position by establishing a settlement at Mount Horki on the Huifa river, where the natural advantages of his location enabled him to withstand repeated Mongol attacks.

On the death of his grandfather Wangginu, who was beile of the Hoifa, Baindari murdered seven uncles who might have stood in his way and proclaimed himself beile of the Hoifa. In 1593, he joined the Hoifa with the tribes of Yehe, Hada, Ula, Khorchin, Sibe, Guwalca, Jušeri, and Neyen against Nurhaci. This alliance led by Narimbulu of the Yehe was unsuccessful, as Nurhaci defeated the allied tribes at the Battle of Gure. In 1595, Nurhaci retaliated by killing two of Baindari's generals and taking Dobi. In 1597 the Hūlun tribes agreed on a truce with Nurhaci and thereafter Baindari, whose territory was situated between the Yehe towns and Nurhaci's center of operations, wavered in allegiance from one to the other, finally deciding to trust in the impregnability of his city to defend him against both. In 1607, however, Nurhaci invaded the region, killed Baindari and his son, and conquered the Hoifa tribe.

Baindari Hoifa Born: ? Died: 1607
Regnal titles
Preceded by Wangginu	Beile of the Hoifa ?–1607	Extinct
