= Sushun (Qing dynasty) =

Manchu nobleman and politician (1816–1861)

Third Class fuguo jiangjun Sushun
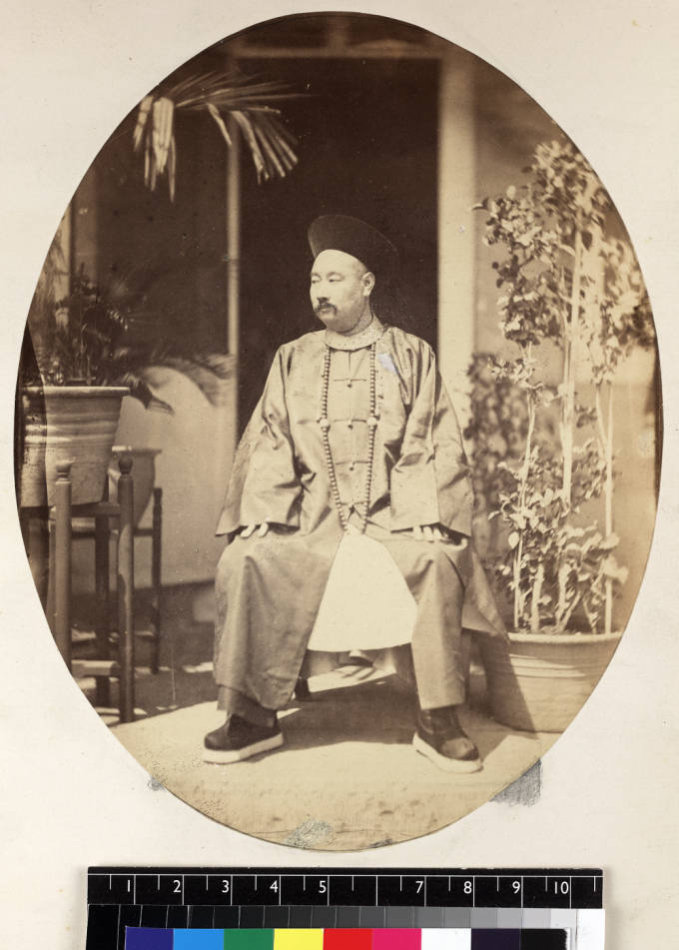

Regent of Qing Dynasty
- In office 22 August – 8 November 1861
- Appointed by: Xianfeng Emperor
- Monarch: Tongzhi Emperor

Assistant Grand Secretary
- In office 5 February 1861 – 2 November 1861

Minister of Revenue
- In office 1 February 1859 – 2 November 1861
- Preceded by: Ruilin
- Succeeded by: Ruichang

Minister of Rites
- In office 16 October 1858 – 1 February 1859
- Preceded by: Ruilin
- Succeeded by: Linkui

Minister of Lifan Yuan
- In office 4 October 1857 – 16 October 1858
- Preceded by: Gengfu
- Succeeded by: Ruichang

Personal details
- Born: 26 November 1816 Beijing, China
- Died: 8 November 1861 (aged 44) Beijing, China
- Relations: Duanhua (brother)
- Parent: Ulgungga, Prince Zheng (father)
- Occupation: Politician

Military service
- Allegiance: Qing dynasty
- Branch/service: Manchu Bordered Blue Banner

Sushun
- Traditional Chinese: 肅順
- Simplified Chinese: 肃顺
Transcriptions
Standard Mandarin
- Hanyu Pinyin: Sùshùn

Yuting (courtesy name)
- Chinese: 雨亭
Transcriptions
Standard Mandarin
- Hanyu Pinyin: Yǔtíng

Sushun (Manchu: ᡠᡴᡠᠨ
ᠰᡠᡧᡡᠨ Uksun Sušun; 26 November 1816 – 8 November 1861), courtesy name Yuting, was a Manchu noble and politician of the Qing dynasty. He was born in the Aisin Gioro clan, the imperial clan of the Qing dynasty, as the sixth son of Ulgungga. Ulgungga was distantly related to the Qing dynasty emperors and was the 12th heir to the Prince Zheng line, one of the "iron-cap" princely peerages of the Qing dynasty. Since the line of Prince Zheng was in charge of the Bordered Blue Banner, Sushun was a member of this banner. Sushun was a supporter of Zeng Guofan and Li Hongzhang but also characterized by his firm policy against the West.

Although Sushun was born into nobility, the size of his family meant that he received little attention during childhood, and little expectation from the family. He was neither well versed in literature nor exceptionally able in martial arts. Sushun became a military general during the late years of the Daoguang Emperor's reign. Following the death of Wenqing, one of the Xianfeng Emperor's closest aides, Sushun was increasingly consulted by the emperor on many important policy matters. His first position in the court was as a member of the Imperial Guard and he subsequently served in a number of senior positions in the government, including a term as the president of the Lifan Yuan. During the Second Opium War, he was one of the chief architects of Qing foreign policy and he repudiated many of the treaties that were concluded in the late 1850s, in particular the territorial concessions in the Sino-Russian Treaty of Aigun. In 1859 Sushun instituted draconian monetary reforms.

Following the death of the Xianfeng Emperor in 1861, Sushun, his elder brother Duanhua, and Zaiyuan, along with five other prominent people in the Qing imperial court, were appointed regents to oversee administrative affairs during the young Tongzhi Emperor's minority. However, without obtaining the seals of the two empress dowagers (Ci'an and Cixi), the regency could not carry out any important policy decisions, which led to increased political friction in the imperial court. In November 1861, a triumvirate consisting of Prince Gong (the Xianfeng Emperor's brother) and the two empress dowagers staged the Xinyou Coup, establishing themselves as the only rightful regents of the Tongzhi Emperor. All the members of the eight-men council were arrested and Sushun was beheaded in public in 1861 on charges of treason.

== Family ==
Father: Ulgungga (乌尔恭阿), Prince Zhengshen of the First Rank

- Paternal grandfather: Jihana (积哈纳)
- Paternal grandmother: Mistress, of the Zheng clan (郑氏)

Mother: Mistress, of the Hui people

Consorts:

- Primary wife, of the Liugiya clan (嫡妻 刘佳氏)， daughter of the Minister of Internal Affairs Akdangga (阿可当阿)
- Wife, of the Jin clan (妻 金氏), daughter of Jin Fu (金福)
- Wife, of the Meng clan (妻 孟氏), daughter of Meng Sheng (孟升)

Issue:

1. Xishan (熙善; 1848–1870)
2. Zhengshan (征善; 21 April 1853 – 30 August 1896), adopted by Duanhua
3. Chengshan (承善; 1854–1904), had 1 son
4. Tongshan (同善; 1856–1899)

== Sources ==
- Hummel, Arthur W. Sr., ed. (1943). "Su-shun" . Eminent Chinese of the Ch'ing Period. United States Government Printing Office.
