= Duanhua =

Manchu prince (1807–1861)

- Prince Zheng of the First Rank 和碩鄭親王

Regent of Qing Dynasty
- Tenure: 22 August 1861 – 8 November 1861
- Appointed by: Xianfeng Emperor

Head of the House of Prince Zheng peerage
- Tenure: 22 March 1846 – 8 November 1861
- Predecessor: Ulgungga (as Prince Zheng)
- Successor: Yueling (as buru bafen fuguo gong)
- Born: 1807; Beijing
- Died: 8 November 1861 (aged 53–54); Beijing
Names
- Duanhua (端華)
- House: Aisin Gioro
- Father: Ulgungga

Duanhua
- Traditional Chinese: 端華
- Simplified Chinese: 端华
Transcriptions
Standard Mandarin
- Hanyu Pinyin: Duānhuá

Duanhua (Manchu: Duwanhūwa; 1807 – 8 November 1861) was a Manchu prince and regent of the Qing dynasty.

== Life ==
Duanhua was born in the Manchu Aisin Gioro clan as the third son of Ulgungga (烏爾恭阿), a descendant of Jirgalang, a nephew of Nurhaci (the founder of the Qing dynasty). He descended from the Prince Zheng line, one of the "iron-cap" princely peerages of the Qing dynasty. In 1846, he inherited the title "Prince Zheng of the First Rank" from his father. His family was under the Bordered Blue Banner of the Eight Banners.

Duanhua rose to prominence during the reign of the Xianfeng Emperor. Because of a scandal involving Grand Councilor Mujangga, Duanhua gained the Xianfeng Emperor's trust as a loyal confidant, and became one of the emperor's closest advisors. Duanhua also recommended his brother, Sushun, to serve in the Qing imperial court. During the Second Opium War, Duanhua accompanied the ailing Xianfeng Emperor to Rehe to escape from the foreign invaders.

In 1861, before the Xianfeng Emperor died, he appointed eight regents to assist his successor, the young Tongzhi Emperor, in administrating state affairs. Duanhua and Sushun were among the eight. Later that year, Duanhua and the other seven regents were ousted from power in the Xinyou Coup (辛酉政變) orchestrated by Prince Gong and Empress Dowager Cixi. Duanhua was arrested, imprisoned, and eventually forced to commit suicide.

== Family ==
Father: Ulgungga (乌尔恭阿; 1778–1846)

- Paternal grandfather: Zhihana (枳哈纳), a great-great-great-grandson of Jirgalang
- Paternal grandmother:Lady Zheng, a mistress

Mother: Lady Hugiya (瑚佳氏), Ulgungga's secondary consort

- Primary consort, of the Niohuru clan, daughter of Fukejing'a (福克京阿), former Minister of Xining Handling Affairs (西宁办事处大臣, also known as the Xining Amban)
  - Lady
    - Married Chongqi of the Alute clan and had issue: A daughter, Empress Jiashun
- Secondary consort, of the Chen clan (陈佳氏), daughter of Sele, a defender general (护军 色勒)
- Secondary consort, of the Gaogiya clan, daughter of defender general Gaofu (高福 护军)
- Secondary consort, of the Baigiya clan, daughter of defender general Jiaohexing (校和兴 护军)

== Ancestry ==
Ancestors of Duanhua

Fengnaheng (丰呐亨
Zhihana
Ulgungga
Lady Zheng, mistress
Duanhua
Lady Hugiya, secondary consort

== See also ==
- Prince Zheng
- Royal and noble ranks of the Qing dynasty
- Ranks of imperial consorts in China § Qing
