= Yixiang =

- Prince Hui of the Second Rank (honorary First Rank) 親王銜多羅惠郡王
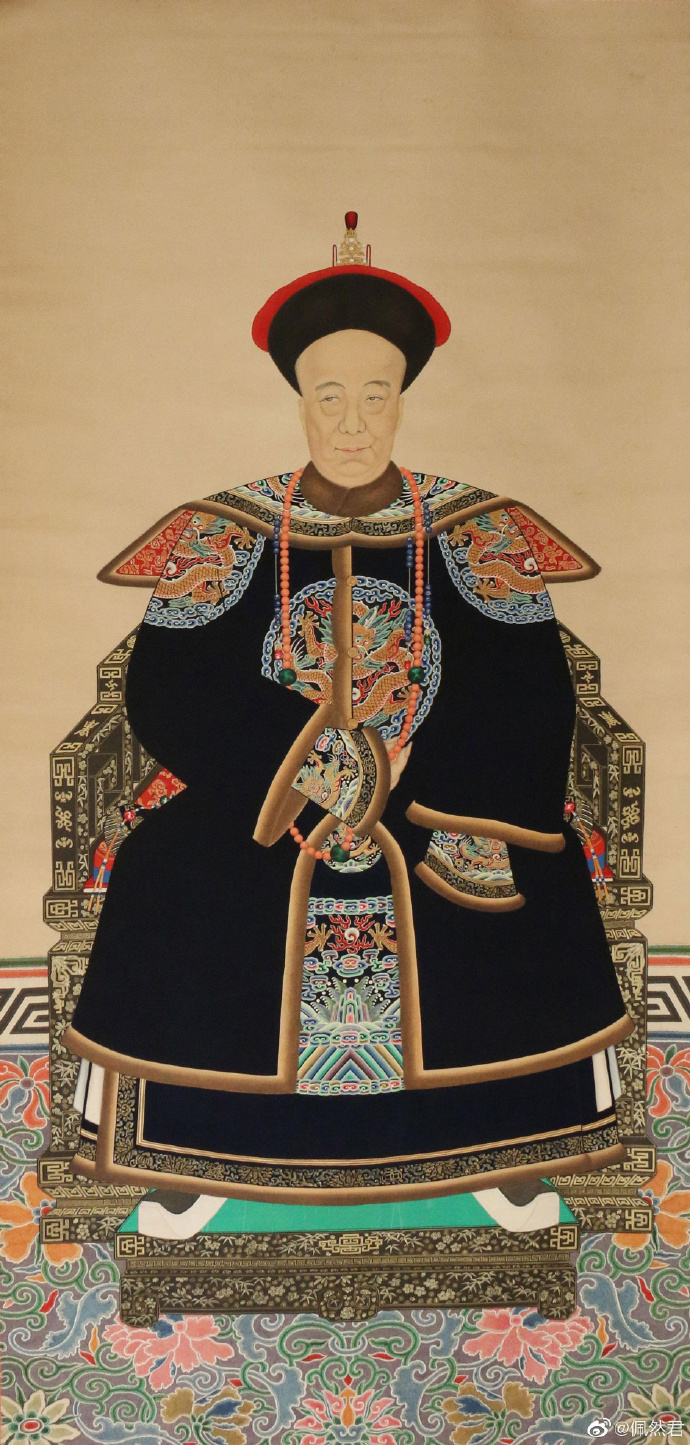

Prince Hui of the Second Rank
- Tenure: 9 January 1865 – 13 February 1886
- Predecessor: Mianyu
- Successor: Zairun
- Born: 15 March 1849
- Died: 13 February 1886 (aged 36)
- Spouse: Lady Guwalgiya; Lady Alut
- Issue: Prince of the Third Rank Zairun; Defender General Zaiji
Posthumous name
- Prince Huijing of the Second Rank (honorary First Rank) (親王銜惠敬郡王)
- Father: Mianyu
- Mother: Lady Guwalgiya

Yixiang (Chinese: 奕詳; 15 March 1849 – 13 February 1886) was Jiaqing Emperor's grandson as the fifth son of Mianyu, Prince Huiduan of the First Rank and the second in the Prince Hui of the First Rank peerage.

== Life ==
Yixiang was born on 15 March 1849 to Mianyu's second primary consort, lady Gūwalgiya, daughter of negotiator of the Tianjin treaty Guiliang. In his childhood, Yixiang was sent together with Yixun to the imperial study so as to accompany Tongzhi Emperor. According to the 1855 report, one of his tutors was Li Hongzao, who also tutored the underage emperor.

=== Career ===
In 1860, Yixiang was granted a title of Feng'en fuguo gong. He was promoted to Feng'en zhenguo gong next year. Upon the death of his father in 1864, Yixiang inherited the title as prince Hui of the Second Rank because the peerage was not granted perpetual inheritability. The proper promotion ceremony was organised after the 100-day period of mourning according to the tradition. On the 40th birthday of Empress Dowager Cixi, Yixiang was granted a status of Prince of the First Rank, which entitled him to share privileges of qinwang though remaining Prince of the Second Rank. In 1879, Yixiang ordered renovation of the Long'en hall of the Yu mausoleum of the Eastern Qing tombs. In 1881, Yixiang was responsible for construction of the tomb of Empress Dowager Ci'an. Henceforth, he was sent to conduct the funeral of the deceased empress dowager there. In 1885, Yixiang was sent to the Hall of Imperial Longevity in order to burn an incense several times.

Yixiang was also known for his contribution in the Taiping rebellion. In 1863, he pacified Jianning province suffering major losses. His involvement was not mentioned in the imperial chronicles.

=== Death and succession ===
Yixiang died on 13 February 1886 at the age of 36 and was posthumously honoured as Prince Huijing of the Second Rank (多罗惠敬郡王, meaning "kind and respectful"). After Yixiang's death, a portion of his blood was granted to the members of his family.

== Family ==
Yixiang was initially married to lady Guwalgiya, daughter of Hife (锡福). Later in 1885, Yixiang married Lady Alut, fifth daughter of Cheng'en duke Chongqi of the Alut clan and sister to Empress Xiaozheyi

Consorts and issue:

- Primary consort, of the Guwalgiya clan (嫡福晋瓜尔佳氏; d.1884)
- Second primary consort, of the Alut clan (继福晋阿鲁特氏; d.1922), younger sister of Empress Xiaozheyi.
  惠郡王侧福晋-->惠郡王继福晋
- Secondary consort, of the Magiya clan (侧福晋马佳氏)
  - Prince of the Third Rank Zairun (多罗贝勒载润; 14 August 1878 – 6 July 1963)
  - Second class defender general Zaiji (二等镇国将军载济; 11 May 1880 – 22 July 1894)
