= Yimo =

- beile-ranked beizi 貝勒銜貝子
- Born: 22 May 1850
- Died: 17 August 1905 (aged 55)
- Spouse: Lady Tatara
- Father: Mianyu
- Mother: Lady Yang

Yimo (奕謨; 22 May 1850 – 17 August 1905) was a Qing dynasty imperial prince as Mianyu's sixth son and Jiaqing Emperor's grandson. Yimo belonged to lesser members of the Prince Hui of the First Rank peerage.

== Life ==
Yimo was born to Mianyu's secondary princess consort, lady Yang. Yimo shared a close relationship with Prince Chun of the First Rank Yixuan.

In 1856, he was made a buru bafen zhenguo gong as a son of the Prince of the First Rank and was given a right to wear peacock feathers. In 1864, he was promoted to feng'en zhenguo gong together with his brother, Yixun. In 1872, Yimo was promoted to the Prince of the Fourth Rank and given a status of Prince of the Third Rank in 1889. In 1875, Yimo was entrusted with commanding Bordered White Banner Mongolian forces. In 1877, when Yimo was ordered to make sacrifices at the Imperial Ancestral Temple, he sent a eunuch Lu Defu.

=== Controversy with Yimo's painting ===
Empress Dowager Cixi could not accept Yimo's relationship with his wife. Yimo was displeased with that fact and created a painting depicting himself running at the tower away from the leg. The repressing leg symbolised Empress Dowager's interference in family affairs. The painting included the following lines:

“老生避脚实堪哀,

Older man tried to escape from strong leg

竭力经营避脚台,

And decided to build a tower so as to hide from it.

避脚台高三百尺,

The tower is three hundred chi high

离三百尺脚仍来。

But the leg doesn't leave alone

The text enraged Empress Dowager Cixi who ordered to burn the picture.

=== Succession and death ===
Yimo's nephew Zaiji (son of Prince Huijing of the Second Rank Yixiang) was adopted in 1886. In 1897, Empress Dowager Cixi adopted son of Prince Chun of the First Rank Zaitao into the peerage. When Yimo saw Zaitao for the first time, he was so pleased as if he had had a son. In 1903, Zaitao was transferred to Prince Zhong peerage following the deposition of Zaiying, Yihe's adoptive son. Yimo died together with his wife on 17 August 1905.

== Family ==
Yimo was married to lady Tatara, daughter of second rank military official Changshan (长善).

- Primary consort, of the Tatara clan (嫡夫人他他拉氏, d. 17 August 1905)

Issue:

- Adoptive son: Zaitao, adopted in 1897 and transferred to Prince Zhong peerage in 1903.
- Adoptive son: Second Class Grace Defender General Zaiji (载济,1881-1894).
- Adoptive grandson: Grace Defender Duke Puji (奉恩镇国公溥佶, 1889–1926). Biological son of Zaiguang (Zaize's brother) and lady Adopted as Yimo's grandson following Zaiji's death in 1905.
