= Beauty at War =

Hong Kong television period drama serial

- Promo poster
- Also known as: War and Beauty 2
- 金枝慾孽貳
- Genre: Period drama Costume drama
- Written by: Chow Yuk-ming
- Starring: Sheren Tang; Ada Choi; Christine Ng; Moses Chan; Kenny Wong; Eddie Kwan; Raymond Cho; Rachel Kan
- Opening theme: "紅孽" (Red Sin) by Christine Ng
- Ending theme: "紫禁飄謠" (Drifting Rumours of the Forbidden City) by Christine Ng & Moses Chan
- Composer: Jacky Chan
- Country of origin: Hong Kong
- Original languages: Cantonese; Mandarin
- No. of episodes: 30

Production
- Executive producer: Jonathan Chik
- Camera setup: Multi camera
- Running time: 45 minutes (each)
- Production company: TVB

Original release
- Network: TVB Jade, HD Jade
- Release: 22 April – 31 May 2013

Related
- War and Beauty (2004)

Beauty at War
- Traditional Chinese: 金枝慾孽貳
- Simplified Chinese: 金枝欲孽贰
- Literal meaning: "Golden Branches Desire War Two"
Transcriptions
Standard Mandarin
- Hanyu Pinyin: Jīn Zhī Yù Niè Èr
Yue: Cantonese
- Yale Romanization: Gam1 Ji1 Yuk6 Yip6 Yi6
- Jyutping: Gam1 Zi1 Juk6 Jip6 Ji6

Beauty at War (Chinese: 金枝慾孽貳), also known as War and Beauty 2, is a Hong Kong television period drama serial produced by Jonathan Chik for TVB. It premiered on TVB Jade in Hong Kong on April 22, 2013. Created by Chik and scriptwriter Chow Yuk-ming, it is a sequel to War and Beauty, which took place in a parallel universe. It stars Sheren Tang, Ada Choi, Christine Ng, Moses Chan, Kenny Wong, Eddie Kwan, Raymond Cho & Rachel Kan. The events of the first installment are depicted as being the result of rumor-mongering, and are frequently referenced.

== Plot ==
The Consort Dowager Shun, Niohuru Yuen-sau (Christine Ng) bears a grudge against her half-sister Niohuru Yu-yuet, the current Consort Yu (Sheren Tang) because she believed that Consort Yu faked her illness during the selection ceremony so that Yuen-sau would be chosen as a concubine of the ailing Emperor, and when the Emperor dies, Yu-yuet will become the new Emperor's consort, rising in power and status and rendering Yuen-sau's status as a consort obsolete. This presumption, coupled with the intense hatred and bitterness building up in her for years caused Yuen-sau to spread rumors about Yu-yuet being an evil and manipulative person (this is seen in the events of War and Beauty). For many years, Yu-yuet tolerated with Yuen-sau and tried her best to reconcile with her but to no avail until a kunqu troupe whom the much lauded Ko Lau Fei (Moses Chan) is a part of enters the palace that Yu-yuet had the opportunity to reach out to Yuen-sau. Because the harem forbids males from entering, the appearance of Ko Lau Fei intrigued its members including the lonely Yuen-sau and wet nurse Seung-ling (Ada Choi), causing much distraught to Yu-yuet. The two sisters began to plot and scheme against each other, with Yuen-sau wanting to keep Ko Lau Fei in the palace and allying with the lunatic Tung Kat Hoi (Kenny Wong) and Yu-yuet planning to send Ko Lau Fei out of the palace with the help of her trusted maid, Yee-ho (Rachel Kan). However, when Yu-yuet found out that Seung-ling fell in love with Ko Lau Fei, it threaten to thwart her schemes.

== Production ==
=== Development and casting ===
In August 2011, TVB announced the development of War and Beauty II, with executive producer Jonathan Chik and executive scriptwriter Chow Yuk-ming returning to produce. Original cast members Sheren Tang, Charmaine Sheh, Moses Chan, and Kenny Wong expressed their interest in returning. Gigi Lai and Bowie Lam, both whom have won TVB Anniversary Award for Best Actress and Best Actor for their performances in the original serial, rejected TVB's offer to return. Lai has retired from acting, while Lam chose to film a mainland drama production instead.

In September 2011, Sheh announced her withdrawal from the cast because she was tied to filming Legend of Yuan Empire Founder. However, it was announced in April 2012 that Sheh would return in a guest role. Maggie Cheung Ho-yee, who was slated to return, also withdrew because she already signed a deal to film Nu Xiang (女相). In October 2011, Tang and Chan has signed to return. Ada Choi, who was originally considered for a role in the original serial, was announced to join the cast. In 2002, Choi filmed a promotional trailer for War and Beauty, which was unveiled at TVB's 2003 Sales Presentation. However, due to other filming commitments, she had to withdraw.

In January 2012, Wong was confirmed to return. Christine Ng was cast in a major role, and Alice Chan, was cast to guest star in an episode.

A press conference with the finalized cast was held on 27 February 2012.

== Cast and characters ==
Some character names are in Cantonese romanisation.

- Sheren Tang as Niohuru Yue-yuet (鈕祜祿·如玥), Consort Yue (如妃) — the elder sister of Consort Dowager Shun. She is the mother of the fifth prince and a deceased princess.
- Ada Choi as Buyamuci Seung-ling (布雅穆齊·湘菱) — the nanny of the fifth prince. She spreads rumors and gossips of the harem outside the Forbidden City.
- Christine Ng as Niohuru Yuen-sau (鈕鈷祿·宛琇), Consort Dowager Shun (淳太妃) — Consort Yue's younger sister. She is the Consort of the Late Qianlong Emperor and is envious of Consort Yu for being Jiaqing's consort. She spreads fake rumors of her sister within the Forbidden City, in which her rumors constitute the events that occur in the alternate universe of War and Beauty.
- Moses Chan as Ko Lau-fei (高流斐) — a famous Kunqu opera artist. Chan portrayed Hung Mo (孔武), a palace guard, in the original serial, and reprised the role in Consort Yue's dream sequence in the finale.
- Kenny Wong as Tung Kat-hoi (佟吉海) — a palace inmate who has a mental disorder. He believes Muk-do-yee will be the person that will bring him and his family fortune. Wong portrayed Sheung Wing-luk (常永祿), a palace eunuch, in the original serial.
- Eddie Kwan as Wan Chau-yuen (雲秋絃) — a Kunqu travesti Hua Dan.
- Raymond Cho as Yeung Chi-hin (楊梓軒) — an imperial physician.
- Rachel Kan as Yiso Yee-ho (伊蘇·爾荷) — a senior palace maid. Kan portrayed as Ting-lan in the original serial.
- Katy Kung as Buyamuci Muk-do-yee (布雅穆齊·木都兒) — a palace maid and the stepdaughter of Seung-ling.
- Wi Kar-hung as Ma San-moon (馬新滿) — a eunuch. Wi portrayed Chan Song (陳爽), an imperial bodyguard, in the original serial.
- Vivien Yeo as Cheung Ying-kam (章映琴) — Chau-yuen's wife.
- Du Yange as Cheung Kuk-sang (章鞠笙) — the head of a Kunqu troupe.
- Tracy Ip as Giarsin Su-lan (書蘭) — a nanny who competes with Seung-ling to be the fifth prince's main nanny.
- Alice Chan as Kwok Yuen-ching (郭婉清) — a songstress, and Ko Lau-fei's lover.
- Stanley Cheung as Sit Tung-shing' (薛東盛) — the head eunuch.
- Stephen Ho as Buyamuci Ba-chat (布雅穆齊·巴察) — the husband of Seung-ling and the father of Muk-doh-yee.
- Leung Ka-ki as Siburu Yeuk-kwai (希卜魯·若葵) — Consort Dowager Shun's maid.
- Christine Kuo as Baigyia Chin-yui (白佳·芊蕊) — Consort Yue's maid.
- Pako Au as Aisin Gioro Min-yu, the Fifth Prince (五阿哥) — the son of Consort Yue and Emperor Jiaqing.

== Reception ==
While the original War and Beauty was met with widespread critical acclaim, the public did not respond well to Beauty at War. Many blamed the scripting and slow pace of the story for the failure of the series, making it a disappointment despite generating much hype before its premiere. During its 4th week run, the series only managed to garner a 19-point ratings, marking an all-time low for a big budget TVB production. This has caused cast member Sheren Tang to publicly speak out against the drama's producers and scriptwriters for last minute changes to the scripts and the long hours of filming. Not all reviews were negative, however, as the public had also praised the performance of Ada Choi in episode 19, who portrayed the wet nurse, Seung-ling, where she lamented over the loss of her three children, saying that she deserved to win the Best Actress award at the annual TVB Anniversary Awards.

== Viewership ratings ==
Week	Episodes	Date	Average Points	Peaking Points
1	01－05	April 22–26, 2013	25	26
2	06－10	April 29 - May 3, 2013	22	25
3	11－15	May 6–10, 2013	22	25
4	16－20	May 13–17, 2013	21	24
5	21－25	May 20–24, 2013	25	28
6	26－30	May 27–31, 2013	28	33

== See also ==
- War and Beauty
