= Consort He =

Consort He may refer to:

== Imperial consorts with the surname He ==
- Empress He (Han dynasty) (died 189), wife of Emperor Ling of Han
- Empress Dowager He (Eastern Wu) (fl. 242–264), Sun He's concubine and Sun Hao's mother
- He Fani (339–404), Emperor Mu of Jin's wife
- He Jingying (fl. 484–494), Xiao Zhaoye's wife
- Empress He (Tang dynasty) (died 905), wife of Emperor Zhaozong of Tang

== Imperial consorts with the title Consort He ==
- Imperial Noble Consort Dunyi (1683–1768), concubine of the Kangxi Emperor
- Consort He (Daoguang) (died 1836), concubine of the Daoguang Emperor

== See also ==
- Princess Dowager Helan (351–396), mother of Emperor Daowu of Northern Wei, Helan was later sinicized to He
- Empress Xiaohui (Song) (929–958), surname He, Emperor Taizu of Song's first wife, died before he usurped the throne
