= Imperial Noble Consort Gongshun =

Consort of the Jiaqing Emperor (1787–1860)

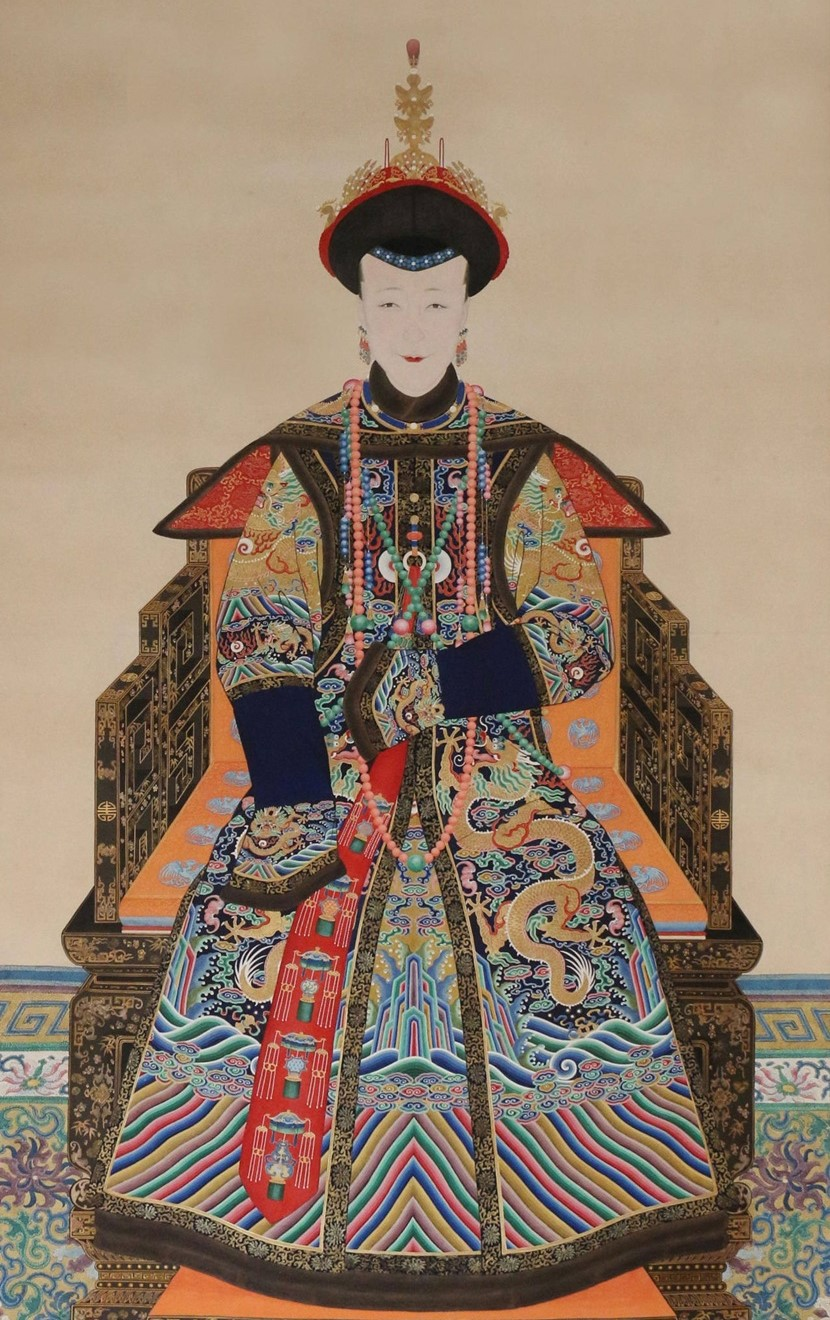
- Qing Dynasty portrait of Imperial Noble Consort Gongshun
- Born: 28 May 1787 (乾隆五十二年 四月 十二日)
- Died: 23 April 1860 (aged 72) (咸豐十年 閏三月 三日); Forbidden City, Beijing, Qing China
- Burial: Chang Mausoleum, Western Qing tombs
- Spouse: Jiaqing Emperor (m. 1801–1820)
- Issue: Eighth daughter Princess Huimin of the First Rank; Mianyu, Prince Huiduan of the First Rank
Posthumous name
- Imperial Noble Consort Gongshun (恭順皇貴妃)
- House: Niohuru (鈕祜祿; by birth); Aisin Gioro (by marriage)

Imperial Noble Consort Gongshun
- Traditional Chinese: 恭順皇貴妃
- Simplified Chinese: 恭顺皇贵妃
Transcriptions
Standard Mandarin
- Hanyu Pinyin: Gōngshùn Huángguìfēi

Imperial Noble Consort Gongshun, of the Manchu Bordered Yellow Banner Niohuru clan, was a consort of the Jiaqing Emperor of China's Qing dynasty. She was 27 years his junior.

== Life ==
=== Family background ===
Imperial Noble Consort Gongshun's personal name was not recorded in history.

- Father: Shanqing (善慶), served as a sixth rank literary official (主事)
- Mother: Lady Yang

=== Qianlong era ===
The future Imperial Noble Consort Gongshun was born on the 12th day of the fourth lunar month in the 52nd year of the reign of the Qianlong Emperor, which translates to 28 May 1787 in the Gregorian calendar.

=== Jiaqing era ===
In 1801, Lady Niohuru entered the Forbidden City and was granted the title "Noble Lady Ru" by the Jiaqing Emperor. On 8 March 1805, she gave birth to his eighth daughter, who would die prematurely in December 1805 or January 1806.

Lady Niohuru was elevated in May or June 1805 to "Concubine Ru", and on 18 October 1810 to "Consort Ru". She gave birth on 18 February 1811 to the emperor's ninth daughter, Princess Huimin of the First Rank, who would die prematurely in June or July 1815, and on 8 March 1814 to his fifth son, Mianyu.

=== Daoguang era ===
The Jiaqing Emperor died on 2 September 1820 and was succeeded by his second son Minning, who was enthroned as the Daoguang Emperor. In January or February 1821, the Daoguang Emperor elevated Lady Niohuru to "Dowager Noble Consort Ru" and let her reside in Shou'an Palace (壽安宮). In 1846, she was elevated to "Dowager Imperial Noble Consort Ru".

=== Xianfeng era ===
The Daoguang Emperor died on 26 February 1850 and was succeeded by his fourth son Yizhu, who was enthroned as the Xianfeng Emperor. Lady Niohuru became "Grand Dowager Imperial Noble Consort Ru". She died on 23 April 1860 and was granted the posthumous title "Imperial Noble Consort Gongshun". She was interred in the Chang Mausoleum of the Western Qing tombs.

== Titles ==
- During the reign of the Qianlong Emperor (r. 1735–1796):
  - Lady Niohuru (from 28 May 1787)
- During the reign of the Jiaqing Emperor (r. 1796–1820):
  - Noble Lady Ru (如貴人; from 1801), sixth rank consort
  - Concubine Ru (如嬪; from May/June 1805), fifth rank consort
  - Consort Ru (如妃; from 18 October 1810), fourth rank consort
- During the reign of the Daoguang Emperor (r. 1820–1850):
  - Dowager Noble Consort Ru (如貴太妃; from January/February 1821), third rank consort
  - Dowager Imperial Noble Consort Ru (如皇貴太妃; from 1846), second rank consort
- During the reign of the Xianfeng Emperor (r. 1850–1861):
  - Imperial Noble Consort Gongshun (恭順皇貴妃; from 10 July 1860)

== Issue ==
- As Noble Lady Ru:
  - The Jiaqing Emperor's eighth daughter (8 March 1805 – 14 January 1806)
- As Consort Ru:
  - Princess Huimin of the First Rank (慧愍固倫公主; 18 February 1811 – 28 June 1815), the Jiaqing Emperor's ninth daughter
  - Mianyu (綿愉; 8 March 1814 – 9 January 1865), the Jiaqing Emperor's fifth son, granted the title Prince Hui of the Second Rank in 1820, elevated to Prince Hui of the First Rank in 1839, posthumously honoured as Prince Huiduan of the First Rank

== In fiction and popular culture ==
- Portrayed by Sheren Tang in War and Beauty (2004) and Beauty at War (2013)
- Portrayed by Katherine Ho in Succession War (2018)

== See also ==
- Ranks of imperial consorts in China#Qing
- Royal and noble ranks of the Qing dynasty
