= Imperial Noble Consort Xianzhe =

Chinese imperial consort (1856–1932)

Imperial Noble Consort Xianzhe 献哲皇贵妃
- Born: 2 July 1856 (咸豐六年 六月 一日)
- Died: 3 February 1932 (aged 75)
- Burial: Hui Mausoleum, Eastern Qing tombs
- Spouse: Tongzhi Emperor (m. 1872; died 1875)
- House: Hešeri (赫舍里; by birth); Aisin-Gioro (by marriage)

Chinese name
- Traditional Chinese: 獻哲皇貴妃
- Simplified Chinese: 献哲皇贵妃
Transcriptions
Standard Mandarin
- Hanyu Pinyin: Xiànzhé Huángguìfēi

Imperial Noble Consort Xianzhe (2 July 1856 – 3 February 1932), of the Manchu Bordered Blue Banner Hešeri clan, was a consort of the Tongzhi Emperor.

== Life ==
=== Family background ===
Imperial Noble Consort Xianzhe's personal name was not recorded in history.

- Father: Chongling (崇齡), served as the Prefect of Chaozhou
  - Paternal grandfather: Shuxingga (舒興阿)， general of Ili
- One sister: wife of Zaiying who is the second son of Prince Gong

=== Xianfeng era ===
The future Imperial Noble Consort Xianzhe was born on the first day of the sixth lunar month in the sixth year of the reign of the Xianfeng Emperor, which translates to 2 July 1856 in the Gregorian calendar.

=== Tongzhi era ===
In November 1872, Lady Hešeri entered the Forbidden City was granted the title "Concubine Yu" by the Tongzhi Emperor. She was deeply favoured by the emperor's mother, Empress Dowager Cixi. On 23 December 1874, Lady Hešeri was elevated to "Consort Yu". Due to her skills, she enjoyed Empress Dowager's Cixi favour. Her residence in the Forbidden City was Palace of Great Benevolence (景仁宮).

=== Guangxu era ===
The Tongzhi Emperor died on 12 January 1875 and was succeeded by his cousin Zaitian, who was enthroned as the Guangxu Emperor. On 29 May 1895, Lady Hešeri was elevated to "Noble Consort Yu".

In 1900, when the forces of the Eight-Nation Alliance invaded Beijing, Empress Dowager Cixi and the Guangxu Emperor fled from Beijing and left Lady Hešeri and other consorts behind. As Imperial Noble Consort Dunyi Rongqing, the most senior among the Tongzhi Emperor's surviving consorts, was in poor health, Lady Hešeri covered her duties for her and took charge of the imperial palace in the Guangxu Emperor's absence.

=== Xuantong era ===
The Guangxu Emperor died on 14 November 1908 and was succeeded by his nephew Puyi, who was enthroned as the Xuantong Emperor. On 18 November 1908, Lady Hešeri was elevated to "Dowager Imperial Noble Consort Yu".

=== Republican era ===
After the fall of the Qing dynasty in 1912, Puyi and members of the imperial clan were allowed to retain their noble titles and continue living in the Forbidden City. On 12 March 1913, Puyi honoured Lady Hešeri with the title "Dowager Imperial Noble Consort Jingyi".

Lady Hešeri was known for her assertive character and fiery temperament, and she did not get along well with the Guangxu Emperor's empress consort, Empress Dowager Longyu. After Empress Dowager Longyu's death, she raised Puyi, who was still a child then, and attempted to take the position of Empress Dowager on the grounds that she was now Puyi's legal mother. However, she was denied permission by Yuan Shikai. After Puyi was forced to leave the Forbidden City on 21 November 1924, Lady Hešeri also followed suit.

Lady Hešeri died of illness on 3 February 1932. A grand funeral was held for her on 23 February 1932, with thousands of people attending. The Beiyang government even had to send police and security forces to maintain order and crowd control. Puyi granted her the posthumous title "Imperial Noble Consort Xianzhe". On 14 March 1935, she was interred in the Hui Mausoleum of the Eastern Qing tombs.

== Titles ==
- During the reign of the Xianfeng Emperor (r. 1850–1861):
  - Lady Hešeri (赫舍裡施; from 2 July 1856)
- During the reign of the Tongzhi Emperor (r. 1861–1875):
  - Concubine Yu (瑜嬪; from November 1872), fifth rank consort
  - Consort Yu (瑜妃; from 23 December 1874), fourth rank consort
- During the reign of the Guangxu Emperor (r. 1875–1908):
  - Noble Consort Yu (瑜貴妃; from 29 May 1895), third rank consort
- During the reign of the Xuantong Emperor (r. 1908–1912):
  - Imperial Noble Consort Yu (瑜皇貴妃; from 18 November 1908), second rank consort
- During the years of the Republic of China (1912–1949):
  - Imperial Noble Consort Jingyi (敬懿皇貴妃; from 12 March 1913)
  - Imperial Noble Consort Xianzhe (獻哲皇貴妃; from 1932)

== In fiction and popular culture ==
- Portrayed by Xing Jun in Princess Der Ling (2006)
- Portrayed by Amy Fan in The Last Healer in Forbidden City (2016)

== See also ==
- Ranks of imperial consorts in China § Qing
- Royal and noble ranks of the Qing dynasty
