= Imperial Noble Consort Gongsu =

Imperial Noble Consort Gongsu may refer to:

- Wan Zhen'er (1428–1487), concubine of the Chenghua Emperor
- Noble Consort Xun (Tongzhi) (1857–1921), concubine of the Tongzhi Emperor
