= Chongqi (official) =

Qing dynasty politician (1829–1900)

Third Class Duke Cheng'en Chongqi 崇綺
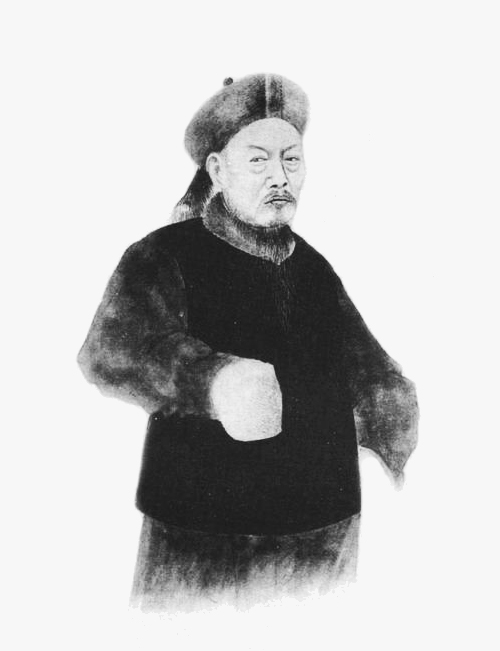

Minister of Revenue
- In office 16 July – 26 August 1900 Serving with Wang Wenshao
- Preceded by: Lishan
- Succeeded by: Jingxin
- In office 11 November 1884 – 3 January 1886 Serving with Yan Jingming
- Preceded by: Elhebu
- Succeeded by: Fukun

Minister of Personnel
- In office 3 January – 16 March 1886 Serving with Xu Tong
- Preceded by: Encheng
- Succeeded by: Xizhen

General of Mukden
- In office 30 August 1881 – 19 January 1884
- Preceded by: Qiyuan
- Succeeded by: Qingyu

Personal details
- Born: 13 October 1829
- Died: 26 August 1900 (aged 70) Baoding
- Spouse(s): Lady Aisin Gioro (daughter of Duanhua), Lady Aisin Gioro (sister of Fukun), Lady Gūwalgiya
- Relations: Duanhua (father-in-law), Imperial Noble Consort Gongsu (sister), Empress Xiaozheyi (daughter), Baochu (son), Yixiang (Son-in-law)
- Parents: Saišangga (father); Lady Fuca (mother)
- Education: zhuangyuan degree in the 1865 imperial examination
- Occupation: politician
- Clan name: Alut (阿魯特)
- Courtesy name: Wenshan (文山)
- Posthumous name: Wenjie (文節)

Military service
- Allegiance: Qing dynasty
- Branch/service: Mongolian Plain Blue Banner, later Manchu Bordered Yellow Banner
- Battles/wars: Taiping Rebellion; Second Opium War; Boxer Rebellion

Chongqi (Chinese: 崇綺, 13 October 1829 – 26 August 1900), courtesy name Wenshan (文山), was a Qing dynasty official from the Alut clan (阿魯特氏). He was the father of Empress Xiaozheyi.

Chongqi was the third son of Saišangga. He started out in official life by purchasing the degree of a licentiate. In 1865, he obtained zhuangyuan degree in the imperial examination and was selected a xiuzhuan (修撰) of the Hanlin Academy. He was the only Mongolian zhuangyuan in the Qing Dynasty, scholar-officials praised him highly. Chongqi had served as Secretary of Cabinet (內閣學士), Vice Minister of Personnel (吏部侍郎), Vice Minister of Revenue (戶部侍郎), deputy lieutenant-general of the Han Chinese Bordered Yellow Banner (鑲黃旗漢軍副都統), lieutenant-general of Rehe (熱河都統), general of Mukden (盛京將軍), Minister of Personnel and other positions.

As an official hostile to Christianity, Chongqi was promoted to the Minister of Revenue by Empress Dowager Cixi during the Boxer Rebellion. He and Xu Tong, submitted a memorial to the court unambiguously demanding the killing of all Chinese Christians and foreigners in China. When Beijing fell to the Eight-Nation Alliance in 1900, Sawara Tokusuke (佐原篤介), a Japanese journalist, wrote in Miscellaneous Notes about the Boxers (拳事雜記) about the rapes of Manchu and Mongol banner girls. Sawara alleged that a daughter and wife of Chongqi were allegedly gang-raped by soldiers of the Eight-Nation Alliance. Chongqi's wife, Lady Gūwalgiya, jumped into a pit and ordered her servants to bury her alive. His son Baochu (葆初), and four grandsons, met the same fate. In the meantime Chongqi fled to Baoding together with Ronglu. After learning of his family's tragic fate, Chongqi committed suicide by hanging.

== Family ==
- Father: Saišangga
- Mother: Lady Fuca (富察氏)
- Primary consort, of the Aisin Giolo clan (愛新覺羅氏), daughter of Duanhua, Prince Zheng of the First Rank (和碩鄭親王端華)
  - Daughter: Empress Xiaozheyi (孝哲毅皇后), married Tongzhi Emperor
- Second primary consort, of the Aisin Giolo clan (愛新覺羅氏), daughter of Vice Commander-in-chief of Jilin Zaiyao (吉林副都統 載耀), sister of Grand Secretary Fukun (大學士 福錕)
  - A daughter, married Yixiang, Prince Hui of the Second Rank (多羅惠郡王奕詳)
- Third primary consort, of the Gūwalgiya clan (瓜爾佳氏, died 1900), daughter of regional commander Changrui (總兵 長瑞)
  - Son: Baochu, Junior Assistant Chamberlain of the Imperial Guard (散秩大臣 葆初, died 1900)
