= Imperial Noble Consort Dunhui =

Consort of the Tongzhi Emperor (1856–1933)

- Born: 6 September 1856 (咸豐六年 八月 八日)
- Died: 18 May 1933 (aged 76)
- Burial: Hui Mausoleum, Eastern Qing tombs
- Spouse: Tongzhi Emperor (m. 1872; died 1875)
Posthumous name
- Imperial Noble Consort Dunhui (敦惠皇貴妃)
- House: Sirin Gioro (西林覺羅; by birth); Aisin Gioro (by marriage)

Imperial Noble Consort Dunhui
- Traditional Chinese: 敦惠皇貴妃
- Simplified Chinese: 敦惠皇贵妃
Transcriptions
Standard Mandarin
- Hanyu Pinyin: Dūnhuì Huángguìfēi

Imperial Noble Consort Dunhui (6 September 1856 – 18 May 1933), of the Manchu Bordered Blue Banner Sirin Gioro clan, was a consort of the Tongzhi Emperor of China's Qing dynasty.

== Life ==
=== Family background ===
Imperial Noble Consort Dunhui's personal name was not recorded in history.

- Father: Luolin (羅霖/罗霖), served as a sixth rank literary official (主事)
  - Paternal grandfather: Jiqing (吉卿)

=== Xianfeng era ===
The future Imperial Noble Consort Dunhui was born on the eighth day of the eighth lunar month in the sixth year of the reign of the Xianfeng Emperor, which translates to 6 September 1856 in the Gregorian calendar.

=== Tongzhi era ===
In November 1872, Lady Sirin Gioro entered the Forbidden City and was granted the title "Noble Lady Jin" by the Tongzhi Emperor. On 23 December 1874, she was elevated to "Concubine Jin".

=== Guangxu era ===
The Tongzhi Emperor died on 12 January 1875 and was succeeded by his cousin Zaitian, who was enthroned as the Guangxu Emperor. Lady Sirin Gioro was elevated on 6 February 1894 to "Consort Jin", and on 29 May 1895 to "Noble Consort Jin".

=== Xuantong era ===
The Guangxu Emperor died on 14 November 1908 and was succeeded by his nephew Puyi, who was enthroned as the Xuantong Emperor. On 18 November 1908, Lady Sirin Gioro was granted the title "Dowager Noble Consort Jin".

=== Republican era ===
After the fall of the Qing dynasty in 1912, Puyi and members of the imperial clan were allowed to retain their noble titles and continue living in the Forbidden City. On 12 March 1913, Puyi elevated Lady Sirin Gioro to "Dowager Imperial Noble Consort Ronghui". After Puyi was forced to leave the Forbidden City on 21 November 1924, Lady Sirin Gioro also followed suit.

Lady Sirin Gioro died on 18 May 1933 in the mansion of Gurun Princess Rongshou, a daughter of Prince Gong. Puyi granted her the posthumous title "Imperial Noble Consort Dunhui". On 15 March 1935, she was interred in the Hui Mausoleum of the Eastern Qing tombs.

== Titles ==
- During the reign of the Xianfeng Emperor (r. 1850–1861):
  - Lady Sirin Gioro (from 6 September 1856)
- During the reign of the Tongzhi Emperor (r. 1861–1875):
  - Noble Lady Jin (瑨貴人/瑨贵人; from November 1872), sixth rank consort
  - Imperial Concubine Jin (瑨嬪/瑨嫔; from 23 December 1874), fifth rank consort
- During the reign of the Guangxu Emperor (r. 1875–1908):
  - Consort Jin (瑨妃/瑨妃; from 6 February 1894), fourth rank consort
  - Noble Consort Jin (瑨貴妃/瑨贵妃; from 29 May 1895), third rank consort
- During the years of the Republic of China (1912–1949):
  - Imperial Noble Consort Ronghui (榮惠皇貴妃/荣惠皇贵妃; from 12 March 1913), second rank consort
  - Imperial Noble Consort Dunhui (敦惠皇貴妃/敦惠皇贵妃; from 1933)

== See also ==
- Ranks of imperial consorts in China § Qing
- Royal and noble ranks of the Qing dynasty
