= Imperial Noble Consort Shushen =

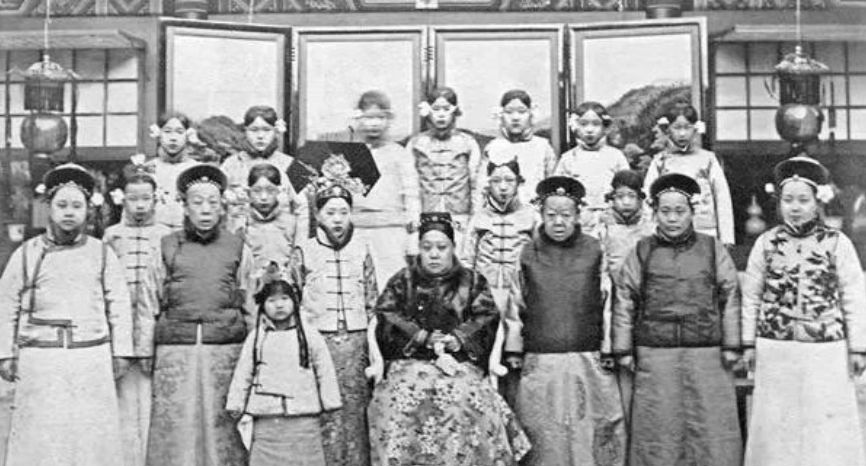
- Imperial Noble Consort Shushen with consorts of the Tongzhi and Guangxu emperors and staff, c. 1903
- Born: 24 December 1859 (咸豐九年 十二月 一日)
- Died: 13 April 1904 (aged 44) (光緒三十年 二月 二十八日); Forbidden City
- Burial: Hui Mausoleum, Eastern Qing tombs
- Spouse: Tongzhi Emperor (m. 1872; died 1875)
Posthumous name
- Imperial Noble Consort Shushen (淑慎皇貴妃)
- House: Fuca (富察; by birth); Aisin Gioro (by marriage)

Imperial Noble Consort Shushen
- Traditional Chinese: 淑慎皇貴妃
- Simplified Chinese: 淑慎皇贵妃
Transcriptions
Standard Mandarin
- Hanyu Pinyin: Shūshèn Huángguìfēi

Imperial Noble Consort Shushen (24 December 1859 – 13 April 1904), of the Manchu Bordered Yellow Banner Fuca clan, was a consort of the Tongzhi Emperor.

== Life ==
=== Family background ===
Imperial Noble Consort Shushen's personal name was not recorded in history.

- Father: Fengxiu (鳳秀), served as a fifth rank literary official (員外郎), Maci's great great great grandson
  - Paternal grandfather: Huiji (惠吉)
- Mother: Lady Jiang (蒋氏)

=== Xianfeng era ===
The future Imperial Noble Consort Shushen was born on the first day of the 12th lunar month in the ninth year of the reign of the Xianfeng Emperor, which translates to 24 December 1859 in the Gregorian calendar.

=== Tongzhi era ===
In 1872, during the auditions for the Tongzhi Emperor's consorts, Lady Fuca and Lady Arute were both shortlisted as candidates to be the empress. Empress Dowager Cixi favoured Lady Fuca while Empress Dowager Ci'an preferred Lady Arute. The Tongzhi Emperor eventually chose Lady Arute to be his empress consort.

On 15 October 1872, Lady Fuca entered the Forbidden City and was granted the title "Consort Hui" by the Tongzhi Emperor. However, by Empress Dowager Cixi's order, she received the preferential treatment of a noble consort. On 23 December 1874, Lady Fuca was elevated to "Imperial Noble Consort".

=== Guangxu era ===
The Tongzhi Emperor died on 12 January 1875 and was succeeded by his cousin Zaitian, who was enthroned as the Guangxu Emperor. In January 1875, Empress Dowager Cixi granted Lady Fuca the title "Imperial Noble Consort Dunyi".

In 1894, just before Empress Dowager Cixi's 60th birthday celebrations, Lady Fuca was honoured with the title "Imperial Noble Consort Dunyi Rongqing". She was the only imperial noble consort in the history of the Qing dynasty to receive a title containing four characters ("Dunyi Rongqing"); imperial noble consorts normally had only two characters in their title.

Lady Fuca died on 13 April 1904 and was granted the posthumous title "Imperial Noble Consort Shushen". In 1905, she was interred in the Hui Mausoleum of the Eastern Qing tombs.

=== Republican era ===
On 29 March 1928, Lady Fuca's tomb was desecrated by grave robbers.

== Titles ==
- During the reign of the Xianfeng Emperor (r. 1850–1861):
  - Lady Fuca (from 24 December 1859)
- During the reign of the Tongzhi Emperor (r. 1861–1875):
  - Consort Hui (慧妃; from 15 October 1872), fourth rank consort
  - Imperial Noble Consort (皇貴妃; from 23 December 1874), second rank consort
- During the reign of the Guangxu Emperor (r. 1875–1908):
  - Imperial Noble Consort Dunyi (敦宜皇貴妃; from January 1875)
  - Imperial Noble Consort Dunyi Rongqing (敦宜荣庆皇贵妃; from 1895)
  - Imperial Noble Consort Shushen (淑慎皇貴妃; from 1904)

== In fiction and popular culture ==
- Portrayed by Chan Pui-san in The Rise and Fall of Qing Dynasty (1990)
- Portrayed by Cilla Kung in The Confidant (2012)
- Portrayed by Janice Shum in The Last Healer in Forbidden City (2016)

== See also ==
- Ranks of imperial consorts in China#Qing
- Royal and noble ranks of the Qing dynasty
