= The Last Healer in Forbidden City =

Hong Kong television series

- Official poster
- Also known as: The Last Imperial Physician
- 末代御醫
- Genre: Historical drama, historical fiction
- Created by: Hong Kong Television Broadcasts Limited
- Written by: Wong Kwok-fai
- Starring: Roger Kwok; Tavia Yeung; Helena Law; Pierre Ngo; JJ Jia; Jonathan Cheung; Rebecca Zhu; Jazz Lam
- Theme music composer: Alan Cheung
- Opening theme: Agony (靈魂的痛) by Hubert Wu
- Country of origin: Hong Kong
- Original language: Cantonese
- No. of episodes: 20

Production
- Executive producer: Catherine Tsang
- Producer: Nelson Cheung
- Production locations: Hong Kong; Panyu District, Guangzhou, China
- Editor: Wong Kwok-fai
- Camera setup: Multi camera
- Running time: 45 minutes
- Production company: TVB

Original release
- Network: Jade
- Release: March 28 – April 22, 2016

Related
- Short End of the Stick; My Dangerous Mafia Retirement Plan

The Last Healer in Forbidden City
- Traditional Chinese: 末代御醫
- Simplified Chinese: 末代御医
- Literal meaning: "The Last Imperial Physician"
Transcriptions
Standard Mandarin
- Hanyu Pinyin: Mòdài Yùyī
Yue: Cantonese
- Yale Romanization: Muhtdoih Yuhyī
- Jyutping: Mut6doi6 Jyu6ji1
- IPA: [mùːt̚.tɔ̀ːy jỳː.jíː]

The Last Healer in Forbidden City (Chinese: 末代御醫; Cantonese Yale: Muhtdoih Yuhyī; literally "The Last Imperial Physician") is a 2016 Hong Kong historical fiction television drama produced by TVB, starring Roger Kwok and Tavia Yeung as the main leads, produced by Nelson Cheung. It premiered on March 28, 2016, airing every Monday to Friday on Hong Kong's TVB Jade, Malaysia's Astro on Demand and Australia's TVBJ channels during its 8:30–9:30 pm timeslot, concluding April 22, 2016 with a total of 20 episodes.

The Last Healer in Forbidden City is a fictional telling told through the account of a physician of Emperor Guangxu played by Roger Kwok about the Emperor's mysterious death at the age of 37. It has long been rumored that the Guangxu Emperor was actually poisoned to death. In 2008, forensic tests done on the Guangxu Emperor remains revealed that high levels of arsenic was found in his remains. The arsenic levels were 2,000 times higher than normal.

== Synopsis ==
The story takes place between 1898 (24th year of Guangxu) and 1908 (34th year of Guangxu), late in the Qing dynasty. Skillful physician To Chung (Roger Kwok) is named the new Imperial Palace physician after he heals Empress Dowager Chee-Hei (Law Lan). He eventually grows close to the Gwong-seoi Emperor (Pierre Ngo), who is under house arrest at the Forbidden City and stripped of his powers after angering Chee-hei by losing the First Sino-Japanese War and rebelling against her authority. He also heals the Emperor and helps his relationship with Consort Tsan (Rebecca Zhu).

As great a physician he is to the imperial family, To Chung cannot heal his crippled wife Hung Bak-hap (JJ Jia). He desperately seeks the services of bone-setter Fuk Ling (Tavia Yeung). Her treatments help relieve some of Bak-hap's pain. Impressed, To Chung refers her to the Forbidden City where she becomes Chee-hei's personal bone-setter.

To Chung and Fuk Ling's friendship eventually turns romantic but his loyalty to Bak-hap and her ulterior motive to kill the Emperor prevents it from developing.

== Cast ==
Character names are in Cantonese romanisation.

=== Main cast ===
Names of the main cast are all homophones to Chinese herbs.

- Roger Kwok as To Chung (杜仲), the imperial doctor who enters the office of imperial doctors by successfully heals Empress Dowager Cixi's sleepwalking.
- Tavia Yeung as Fuk Ling (伏苓), the revolutionist and an osteopath.

=== Imperial Qing ===
- Law Lan as Empress Dowager Chee-hei (慈禧太后)
- Pierre Ngo as Kwong-shui Emperor (光緒帝)
- Rebecca Zhu as Consort Chun (珍妃)
- Jonathan Cheung as Tsoi-fung, Prince Shun (醇親王載灃)
- Regen Cheung as Yau Lan (幼蘭)
- William Hu as Tsoi-yi, Prince Tuen (端郡王載漪)
- Pauline Chow as Empress Lung-yue (隆裕皇后)
- Janice Shum as Noble Consort Wai (慧貴妃)
- Amy Fan as Noble Consort Yue (瑜貴妃)
- Lee Yee-man as Consort Kan (瑾妃)
- Kirby Lam as Princess Yuen Kai (涴佳格格)
- Rainky Wai as Tak Ling (德齡)
- Jazz Lam as Kot Kan (葛根), Fuk Ling's Chuen Yan House staff and later an imperial guard.
- Tsoi Kwok-hing as Yuan Sai-hoi (袁世凱)

=== Extended cast ===
- JJ Jia as Hung Bak-hap (洪百合), To's wife who is a disable, and using a wooden wheelchair to walk instead
- Stanley Cheung as Yam Sek-gang (任錫庚), an imperial doctor who is a closed friend of To
- Eileen Yeow as To's elder sister who always worries about To's heritage.
- Yu Chi-ming as Lee Lin-Ying (李連英)

== Development ==
- The costume fitting ceremony and blessing ceremony was held together on May 12, 2015 at 4:00 pm Tseung Kwan O TVB City Studio 15.
- A promo image of The Last Healer in Forbidden City was featured in TVB's 2016 calendar for the month of October .
- The Last Healer in Forbidden City was one of five dramas shelved by new TVB CEO Mark Lee (李寶安) in early 2016, as he considered the drama low quality and not fit to be broadcast.

== Viewership ratings ==
Timeslot (HKT)	#	Week	Episode(s)	Average points	Peaking points
Mon – Fri (8:30–9:30 pm); 20:30–21:30	1	Mar 28 – April 1, 2016	1–5	25	–
Mon – Fri (8:30–9:30 pm); 20:30–21:30	2	April 4–8, 2016	6–10	23	25
Mon – Fri (8:30–9:30 pm); 20:30–21:30	3	April 11–15, 2016	11–15	22	23
Mon – Fri (8:30–9:30 pm); 20:30–21:30	4	April 18–22, 2016	16–20	23	26
Total average				23.25	27

== International broadcast ==
Network	Country	Airing Date	Timeslot
Astro on Demand	Malaysia	March 28, 2016	Monday – Friday 8:30–9:15 pm
8TV (Malaysia)	Malaysia	June 26, 2018	Monday – Friday 7:00–8:00 pm
TVBJ	Australia	March 28, 2016	Monday – Friday 7:15–8:15 pm
Starhub TV	Singapore	July 4, 2016	Monday – Friday 8:00–9:00 pm

== Awards and nominations ==
Year	Ceremony	Category	Nominee	Result
2016	StarHub TVB Awards	My Favourite TVB Drama	The Last Healer in Forbidden City	Nominated
2016	StarHub TVB Awards	My Favourite TVB Actor	Roger Kwok	Nominated
2016	StarHub TVB Awards	My Favourite TVB Supporting Actor	Pierre Ngo	Nominated
2016	TVB Star Awards Malaysia	My Favourite TVB Actor in a Supporting Role	Pierre Ngo	Nominated
2016	TVB Star Awards Malaysia	My Favourite Top 15 TVB Drama Characters	Roger Kwok	Nominated
2016	TVB Star Awards Malaysia	My Favourite Top 15 TVB Drama Characters	Tavia Yeung	Nominated
2016	TVB Anniversary Awards	Best Series	The Last Healer in Forbidden City	Nominated
2016	TVB Anniversary Awards	Best Actress	Tavia Yeung	Nominated
2016	TVB Anniversary Awards	Most Popular Series Song	Agony (靈魂的痛) by Hubert Wu	Nominated

== Related history events ==
- Boxer Rebellion
- Eight-Nation Alliance
