= Zaize =

Noble and constitutional reformer in China (1868–1929)

Beizi-ranked Feng'en Zhenguo Gong Zaize
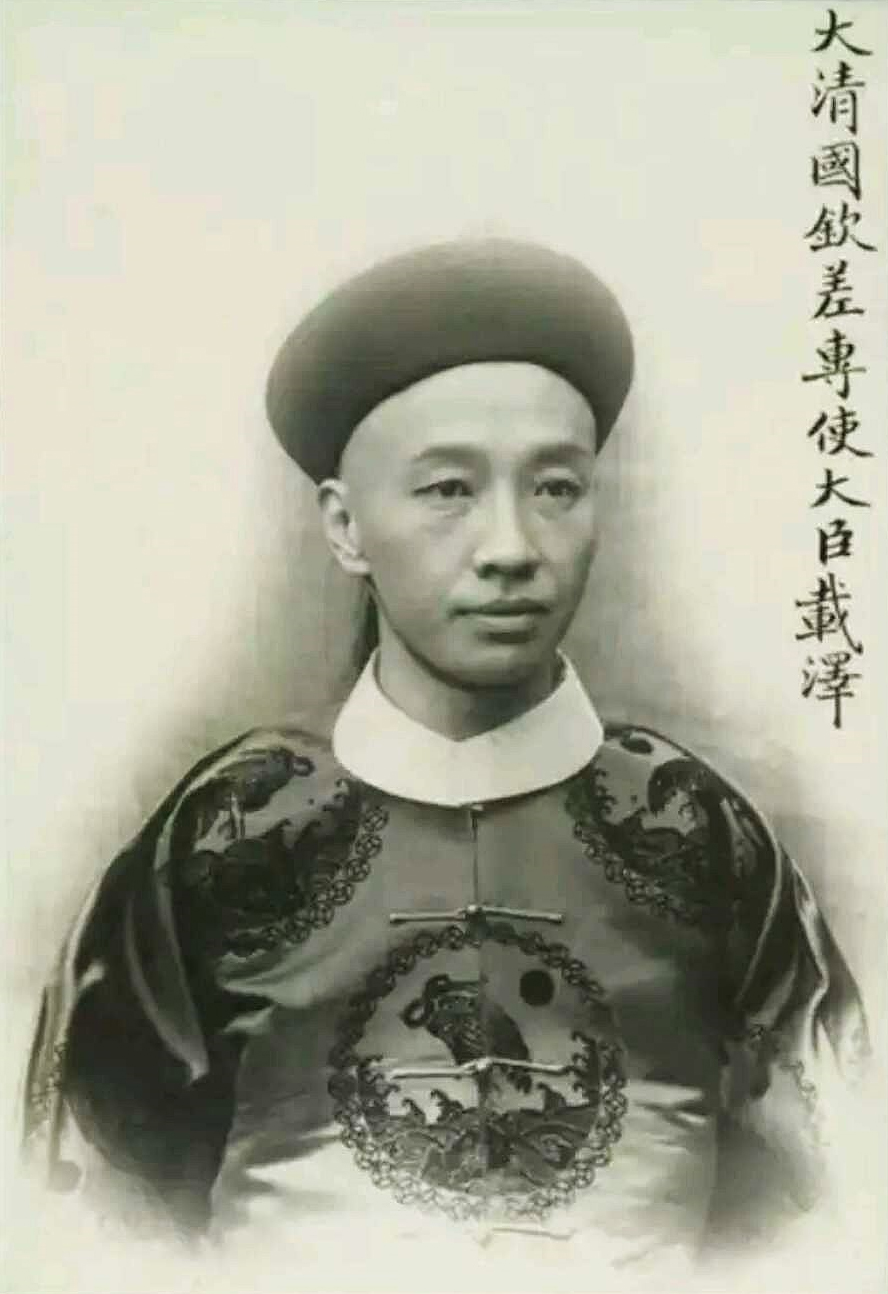

Minister of Finance
- In office 18 May 1911 – 1 November 1911
- Monarch: Xuantong Emperor
- Preceded by: Puting
- Succeeded by: Yan Xiu

Personal details
- Born: 17 March 1868 Beijing, Qing Empire
- Died: June 1929 (aged 61) Beiping, Republic of China
- Spouse: Jingrong

Zaize
- Traditional Chinese: 載澤
- Simplified Chinese: 载泽
Transcriptions
Standard Mandarin
- Hanyu Pinyin: Zǎizé

Zaijiao (birth name)
- Traditional Chinese: 載蕉
- Simplified Chinese: 载蕉
Transcriptions
Standard Mandarin
- Hanyu Pinyin: Zǎijiāo

Yinping (courtesy name)
- Traditional Chinese: 蔭坪
- Simplified Chinese: 荫坪
Transcriptions
Standard Mandarin
- Hanyu Pinyin: Yīnpíng

Zaize (17 March 1868 – June 1929), born Zaijiao, courtesy name Yinping, was a Manchu noble of the Qing dynasty. He is best known for supporting reforms and advocating the adoption of a constitutional monarchy system in the final years of the Qing dynasty.

== Life and service under the Qing dynasty ==
Zaize was born in the Aisin Gioro clan as a descendant of Yunxu, the 15th son of the Kangxi Emperor. His father, Yicheng (奕棖), held the title of a second class fuguo jiangjun. Yixun (奕詢; 1849–1871), the fourth son of Mianyu (綿愉; 1814–1865), had no male heir to succeed him, hence he adopted Zaize as his son, belonging to the Plain Yellow Banner

In 1877, Zaize inherited his adoptive father's title as a feng'en fuguo gong. In 1894, he married Jingrong (靜榮) of the Yehenara clan. Jingrong was the eldest daughter of Guixiang (桂祥), a younger brother of Empress Dowager Cixi. Jingrong's younger sister, Jingfen, married the Guangxu Emperor. After his marriage, Zaize was promoted from feng'en fuguo gong to feng'en zhenguo gong.

In 1901, Zaize was appointed as the dutong (都統; commander) of the Plain Blue Banner of the Eight Banners. In 1905, Zaize, Xu Shichang, Duanfang, Dai Hongci (戴鴻慈) and Shaoying (紹英) were commissioned by the Qing government to visit Europe, Japan and the United States to learn more about their political systems. Before leaving China, he was injured in an assassination attempt by Wu Yue (吳樾), a revolutionary, at the Beijing railway station, hence his trip was delayed. When he returned to China a year later, he wrote a memorial to the imperial court, proposing that they follow in the footsteps of Japan and Germany by converting the Qing Empire into a constitutional monarchy. In 1907, he was appointed as the shangshu (尚書; Secretary) of the Ministry of Finance (度支部). A year later, he was made an acting beizi even though nominally he remained as a feng'en zhenguo gong.

Zaize served as Minister in Charge of Naval Affairs (籌辦海軍事務大臣) in 1909. A year later, he was reassigned to be Minister in Charge of Drafting Constitutional Law (纂擬憲法大臣). In 1911, he was appointed to the newly established Imperial Cabinet headed by its first Prime Minister, Prince Qing. He served as Minister of Finance (度支部大臣) and Minister of Salt Policy (鹽政大臣) in the Imperial Cabinet. However, he was not on good terms with Prince Qing. He also actively urged the Qing government to execute the general Yuan Shikai.

== Life after the Qing dynasty ==
Zaize resigned from his ministerial appointments when the Xinhai Revolution broke out in October 1911. Even after the revolution overthrew the Qing dynasty and established the Republic of China, Zaize still secretly plotted with some former nobles and others to restore the monarchy. In 1917, he supported the general Zhang Xun, who tried to put Puyi, the Last Emperor who abdicated in 1912, back on the throne.

In July 1928, the warlord Sun Dianying looted the Eastern Mausoleum, where the tomb of Empress Dowager Cixi was located. Zaize, acting on behalf of the former Qing dynasty nobles, visited the empress dowager's tomb and tried to restore it. He died in poverty and misery in Beijing in June 1929.

Zaize's former residence, the Ze Gong Fu (澤公府; "Residence of Lord (Zai)Ze"), is located at 89 Di'anmen East Street in Beijing.

== See also ==
- Prince Hui (first rank)
- Royal and noble ranks of the Qing dynasty#Male members
- Ranks of imperial consorts in China#Qing
