= Yiwei =

Qing dynasty prince (1808–1831)

Yiwei 奕緯
- Prince of the Third Rank
- Born: Aisin Gioro Yiwei (愛新覺羅·奕緯); 16 May 1808; Residence of Minning
- Died: 23 May 1831 (aged 23); Imperial Gardens, Beijing
- Consort(s): Lady Gūwalgiya (m. 1822; died 1827) Lady Ulanghan
Names
- Aisin-Gioro Yiwei (愛新覺羅·奕緯)
Posthumous name
- Prince Yinzhi of the Second Rank (隱志郡王)
- House: Aisin-Gioro
- Dynasty: Qing
- Father: Daoguang Emperor
- Mother: Consort He

Yiwei (奕緯; 16 May 1808 – 23 May 1831) was Qing dynasty imperial prince as Daoguang Emperor's first son.

== Life ==
Yiwei was born to a maid in the residence of Minning, Lady Hoifa-Nara. His mother was later promoted to a position of secondary consort. In 1822, his mother was granted a title of Concubine He. Before Lady Hoifa-Nara was granted an honorifical title, she had been addressed as "Second Concubine".

In 1816, Yiwei was granted a title of "Prince of the Third Rank" by the Jiaqing Emperor. It is said that he had a beautiful appearance, but was neither exceptionally well-versed in literature and martial arts nor showed diligence in the studies. One day, after he was reprimanded by a teacher, he told that if he had been an emperor, he would have killed the teacher. This deeply enraged the Daoguang Emperor, who spanked the prince and ordered him to return to his study to reflect on himself.

In 1825, Yiwei organised Grand Sacrificial Ceremonies together with his paternal uncle Miankai. In 1830, Yiwei was once again sent to conduct sacrifices together with his fifth paternal uncle Mianyu.

Yiwei died of illness on 23 May 1831 in the Old Summer Palace. The cause of his death became debatable subject among scholars. Official Qing dynasty records briefly mention that Yiwei was sent for recuperation and do not mention the diagnosis. It was suggested that careless and delayed treatment done by imperial doctors caused the death. Daoguang Emperor was shocked over the abrupt death of his son. When the funeral was organised in the Wuying Hall in the Forbidden City, Daoguang Emperor suddenly left it. His studio was abandoned for 17 years and was later given as a residence of Yizhu and Yixin. Yiwei was posthumously granted a title of Prince Yinzhi of the Third Rank (多罗隐志贝勒, meaning "profoundly aspiring"). In 1850, he was posthumously promoted to Prince Yinzhi of the Second Rank (隐志郡王).

== Family ==
Yiwei was married to Lady Gūwalgiya, daughter of Duke Yinghai (英海) since 1822. His primary consort died in 1827. He later married Lady Ulanghan, daughter of sixth rank literary official Lude (禄德).

Primary Consort

- First primary consort, of the Gūwalgiya clan (嫡福晋 瓜尔佳氏; d. 1827)
  皇长子嫡福晋→隐志贝勒嫡夫人→隐志郡王嫡福晋
- Second primary consort, of the Ulanghan clan (继福晋 乌朗罕氏; d. 1871)
  皇长子侧福晋→皇长子继福晋→隐志贝勒继夫人→隐志郡王继福晋

Concubine

- Mistress, of an unknown clan (庶福晋 某氏)
  皇长子庶福晋→隐志贝勒妾→隐志郡王庶福晋

Adopted son: Zaizhi (载治; 14 February 1839 – 27 January 1881), son of Defender General Yiji (from the Prince Xun peerage) and Lady Shen
