= Saišangga =

Qing dynasty politician (1798–1875)

Chief Grand Councillor
- In office 1 February 1851 – 14 October 1852
- Preceded by: Qi Junzao
- Succeeded by: Qi Junzao

Grand Councillor
- In office 9 September 1835 – 7 August 1837
- In office 31 January 1841 – 14 October 1852

Grand Secretary of the Wenhua Hall
- In office 21 February 1851 – 14 October 1852

Minister of Revenue
- In office 29 March 1845 – 1 February 1851 Serving with Qi Junzao (until 1850), Sun Ruizhen (since 1850)
- Preceded by: Jingzheng
- Succeeded by: Yucheng

Minister of Works
- In office 14 July 1841 – 29 March 1845 Serving with Liao Hongquan (until 1844), Chen Guanjun (1844–1845), Du Shoutian (since 1845)
- Preceded by: Jingzheng
- Succeeded by: Yucheng

Minister of Lifan Yuan
- In office 8 October 1838 – 14 July 1841
- Preceded by: Ujungge
- Succeeded by: Engui

lieutenant-general of Chahars
- In office 7 August 1837 – 8 October 1838
- Preceded by: Leshan
- Succeeded by: Buyantai

Personal details
- Born: Saišangga; 1798
- Died: 1875 (aged 76–77) Beijing
- Spouse: Lady Fuca
- Relations: Imperial Noble Consort Gongsu (daughter); Chongqi (son) Empress Xiaozheyi (granddaughter)
- Parents: Jinghui (景煇) (father); Lady Janggiya (mother)
- Education: juren degree in the Mongolian Translation Examination (1816)
- Occupation: politician
- Clan name: Alut (阿魯特)
- Courtesy name: Heting (鶴汀)

Military service
- Allegiance: Qing dynasty
- Branch/service: Mongolian Plain Blue Banner
- Battles/wars: Taiping Rebellion

Saišangga (Manchu: ᠰᠠᡳ᠌ᡧᠠᠩᡤᠠ, Chinese: 賽尚阿, 1798–1875), courtesy name Heting (鶴汀), was a Qing dynasty official and linguist from the Mongolian Alut clan and the Mongolian Plain Blue Banner. He was the father of Imperial Noble Consort Gongsu. His third son was Chongqi.

Saišangga obtained juren degree in the Mongolian Translation Examination (蒙古繙譯) in 1816. The Translation Examination (繙譯科) was an imperial examination subject that only young Bannermen can participate in; the Mongolian Translation Examination required translating from Mongolian to Manchu. Influenced by his father Jinghui (景煇), whom was also a linguist, Saišangga was proficient in Manchu, Mongolian and Chinese. Therefore, he was highly valued by Daoguang and Xianfeng. He had served as Grand Councillor, Minister of Lifan Yuan, Minister of War, Minister of Works, Minister of Revenue, Minister of Personnel, Grand Secretary and other positions. During the First Opium War, he was twice sent to Tianjin to supervise the defense of the coast.

In the year 1851, Taiping Rebellion broke out in Guangxi. The provincial governor Zhou Tianjue (周天爵) and provincial military commander Xiang Rong were unable to suppress the rebellion. Saišangga was made in charge of military affairs in Guangxi to fight against the Taiping rebels, cooperating financially with Qishan. Accused of allowing the rebels to move from Guangxi to Hunan, he was dismissed and escorted to Beijing for trial.

In 1853, Saišangga was stripped of official position, imprisoned and waited for execution. However, Xianfeng Emperor pardoned him and exiled him to Zhili. In 1855, he was sent to serve at frontier military outposts (軍台效力). Soon after the Second Opium War broke out, he was recalled to the capital and ordered to train Chahar Mongolian soldiers. he was appointed the deputy lieutenant-general of the Mongolian Plain Red Banner (正紅旗蒙古副都統) in 1860. He died in 1875.

== Publications ==
- Huijiang zeli (回疆則例)
- Mengwen zhiyao (蒙文旨要)
