= Sirin Gioro =

Manchu clan and family name

Manchu name
- Manchu script: ᠰᡳᡵᡳᠨ ᡤᡳᠣᡵᠣ
- Möllendorff: Sirin Gioro

Chinese name
- Chinese: 西林觉罗氏
Transcriptions
Standard Mandarin
- Hanyu Pinyin: xī lín jué luó shì

Pronunciation respelling name
- Pronunciation respelling: See-reen Ghee-ore-oh

Sirin Gioro is one of the principal branches of the Gioro clan and a prominent Manchu surname. Its members were distributed across numerous localities, including Wangjin, Foala, the Changbai Mountains, Ningguta, Jiyang, Hoifa, Jakumu, Nimaca, and Hada. Following the fall of the Qing dynasty, members of the clan generally adopted Chinese surnames such as Zhao, È, Shao, Yue, Chen, Huang, Li, and Shu.

== Overview ==
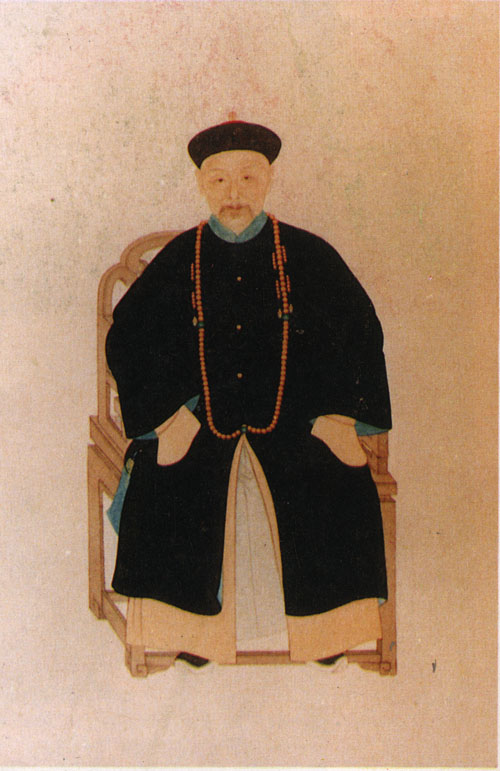
Grand councillor Ortai, a descendant of Tundai

=== Tundai family ===
The most distinguished branch descended from Tundai (屯台) of Wangjin, who joined the rise of Nurhaci in the early years. Nurhaci held him in high regard, arranging marriage alliances between their families and appointing him as a nirui janggin with the hereditary rank of baitalabure hafan. Tundai's eldest son Tumen inherited the title and was mortally wounded during the Siege of Dalinghe. Hong Taiji personally visited him, and later posthumously honored him; during the Yongzheng reign, Tumen was further posthumously elevated in recognition of the achievements of his great-grandson Ortai.

Tumen's descendants included many banner officers and military commanders, but the most prominent line descended from his third son Oboi (鄂拜). Oboi's fourth son Ortai rose to become Grand Secretary of the Baohe Hall (文華殿大学士), Grand Councillor (軍機大臣), and a Earl Third-Class (三等伯爵) for his role in the pacification of southwestern native chieftains. Another son, Orci (鄂爾奇), attained the jinshi degree and served as Ministers of Revenue and War. Several later descendants also held high office. Following Ortai's death, however, his family's political influence declined after being subjected to imperial suspicion and purges under the Qianlong Emperor.

Tuntai's second son Muceng and several other clansmen, including the families of Sirengge, Udangga, and Gunbai, also held positions and earned minor hereditary nobles titles.

=== Others ===
Other Sirin Gioro families were scattered across the neighboring regions of Wangjin. Descendants of Yarna, Larba, Benbunu, Buyan, Berengge, Yandai, etc. inherited ranks such as adaha hafan, baitalabure hafan, and served the Qing government in military and administrative positions.

== Notable figures ==
=== Males ===
- Tundai (屯台), one of the early contributor of the Qing dynasty.
  - Tumen
    - Ošan (鄂善)
      - Ocang (鄂昌)
    - Ortai
      - Oyonggo (鄂容安)
      - Oning (鄂寧)

Prince Consorts

Year	Prince Consort	Princess	Sons	Daughters
March/April 1742	Ohin (鄂欣)	Lady of the Third Rank (鄉君; 1 May 1725 – 11 April 1794)		

=== Females ===
Imperial Consort

- Imperial Noble Consort
  - Imperial Noble Consort Dunhui (1856–1933), the Tongzhi Emperor's imperial concubine
- Noble Lady
  - Noble Lady E (1733–1808), the Qianlong Emperor's noble lady

Princess Consort

- Primary Consort
  - Šurhaci's ninth primary consort
  - Ajige's first primary consort, the mother of Hedu (1619–1646)
  - Yongqi's primary consort, the mother of sixth son (1765)
- Concubine
  - Nurhaci's concubine, the mother of Laimbu (1612–1646)
  - Hooge's concubine, the mother of eighth daughter (1641–1703) and ninth daughter (1644–1661)
  - Hooge's concubine, the mother of 11th daughter (1646 – 1692 or 1693)
