= Noble Consort Xun (Tongzhi) =

Chinese imperial consort (1857–1921)

Imperial Noble Consort Gongsu
- Born: 20 September 1857 (咸豐七年 八月 三日)
- Died: 14 April 1921 (aged 63); Forbidden City
- Burial: Hui Mausoleum, Eastern Qing tombs
- Spouse: Tongzhi Emperor (m. 1872; died 1875)
Posthumous name
- Imperial Noble Consort Gongsu (恭肅皇貴妃)
- House: Alut (阿魯特; by birth); Aisin Gioro (by marriage)
- Father: Saišangga

Noble Consort Xun
- Traditional Chinese: 恭肅皇貴妃
- Simplified Chinese: 恭肃皇贵妃
Transcriptions
Standard Mandarin
- Hanyu Pinyin: Gōngsù Huángguìfēi

Noble Consort Xun (Chinese: 珣貴妃, 20 September 1857 – 14 April 1921), of the Manchu Bordered Yellow Banner Alut clan, posthumous name Imperial Noble Consort Gongsu, was a consort of the Tongzhi Emperor. She was one year his junior.

== Life ==
=== Family background ===
Noble Consort Xun's personal name was not recorded in history. Her family originally belonged to the Mongol Plain Blue Banner.

- Father: Saišangga (賽尚阿/赛尚阿; 1794–1875), served as the Minister of Works from 1841 to 1845
  - Paternal grandfather: Jinghui (景辉)
  - Paternal grandmother: Lady Zhang (张氏)
- Mother: Lady Fuca
  - Maternal grandfather: Xingfu (兴福)
- Four brothers
  - Third elder brother: Chongqi (崇綺/崇绮; 1829–1900), the top candidate in the 1865 imperial examination, served as a fourth rank literary official (侍講) in the Hanlin Academy, the Minister of Revenue from 1884 to 1886 and in 1900 and the Minister of Personnel in 1886, and held the title of a third class duke (三等公), the father of Empress Xiaozheyi (1854–1875)

=== Xianfeng era ===
The future Imperial Noble Consort Gongsu was born on the third day of the eighth lunar month in the seventh year of the reign of the Xianfeng Emperor, which translates to 20 September 1857 in the Gregorian calendar.

=== Tongzhi era ===
In November 1872, Lady Alut entered the Forbidden City and was granted the title "Concubine Xun" by the Tongzhi Emperor. Her niece, Lady Alute entered the Forbidden City a month earlier as Empress. On 23 December 1874, she was elevated to "Consort Xun". Her residence in the Forbidden city was Palace of Great Benevolence.

=== Guangxu era ===
The Tongzhi Emperor died on 12 January 1875 and was succeeded by his cousin Zaitian, who was enthroned as the Guangxu Emperor. On 29 May 1895, Lady Alut was elevated to "Noble Consort Xun".

=== Xuantong era ===
The Guangxu Emperor died on 14 November 1908 and was succeeded by his nephew Puyi, who was enthroned as the Xuantong Emperor. On 18 November 1908, Lady Alut was elevated to "Dowager Imperial Noble Consort Xun". She moved to Chuxiu Palace (儲秀宮/储秀宫) in the western part of the Forbidden City.

=== Republican era ===
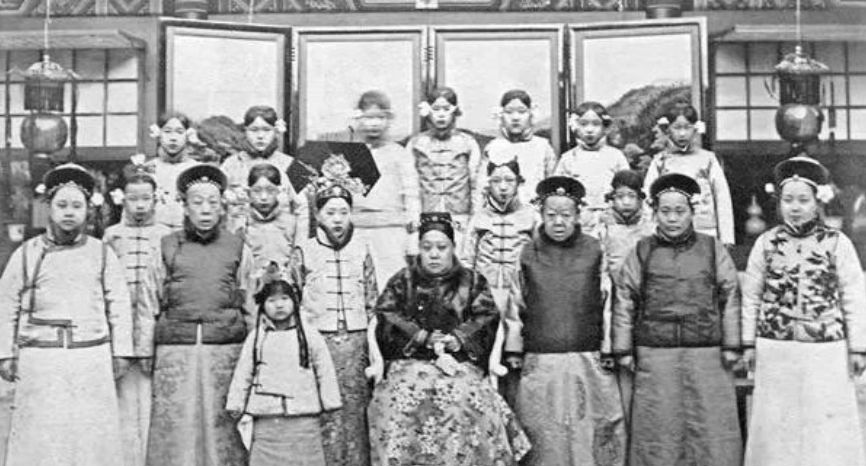
Imperial Noble Consort Zhuanghe with dowager consorts

After the fall of the Qing dynasty in 1912, Puyi and the imperial clan were allowed to retain their noble titles and continue living in the Forbidden City. On 12 March 1913, Puyi honoured Lady Alut with the title "Dowager Imperial Noble Consort Zhuanghe".

Lady Alut died of illness on 14 April 1921 and was posthumously honoured as "Imperial Noble Consort Gongsu". She was interred in the Hui Mausoleum of the Eastern Qing tombs.

== Titles ==
- During the reign of the Xianfeng Emperor (r. 1850–1861):
  - Lady Alut (from 20 September 1857)
- During the reign of the Tongzhi Emperor (r. 1861–1875):
  - Concubine Xun (珣嬪; from November 1872), fifth rank consort
  - Consort Xun (珣妃; from 23 December 1874), fourth rank consort
- During the reign of the Guangxu Emperor (r. 1875–1908):
  - Noble Consort Xun (珣貴妃; from 29 May 1895), third rank consort
- During the reign of the Xuantong Emperor (r. 1908–1912):
  - Imperial Noble Consort (皇貴妃; from 18 November 1908), second rank consort
- During the years of the Republic of China (1912–1949):
  - Imperial Noble Consort Zhuanghe (莊和皇貴妃; from 12 March 1913)
  - Imperial Noble Consort Gongsu (恭肅皇貴妃; from 1921)

== See also ==
- Ranks of imperial consorts in China#Qing
- Royal and noble ranks of the Qing dynasty
