= Mianyu =

- Prince Hui of the First Rank 和碩惠親王

Prince Hui of the First Rank
- Tenure: 23 February 1839 – 9 January 1865
- Successor: Yixiang

Prince Hui of the Second Rank
- Tenure: 3 October 1820 – 23 February 1839
- Born: 8 March 1814
- Died: 9 January 1865 (aged 50)
- Spouse: Lady Gūwalgiya; Lady Gūwalgiya
- Issue: Yicheng, Yixun, Yixiang, Yimo
Posthumous name
- Prince Huiduan of the First Rank (惠端親王)
- Father: Jiaqing Emperor
- Mother: Imperial Noble Consort Gongshun

Mianyu (綿愉; 8 March 1814 – 9 January 1865) was Qing dynasty imperial prince as the fifth son of the Jiaqing Emperor and the first holder of the Prince Hui of the first rank title. As Prince Hui of the First Rank peerage was not granted iron-cap status, each successive bearer of the title would hold diminished rank vis-a-vis his predecessor.

== Life ==
Mianyu was born on 8 March 1814 to Consort Ru in the Palace of Eternal Longevity. In 1820, shortly after the death of Jiaqing Emperor in the Chengde Mountain Resort, Mianyu was granted a title of Prince Hui of the Second Rank (惠郡王) by Empress Dowager Gongci as the successor to the imperial throne has not been appointed. In 1830, he performed Grand Sacrifices together with Yiwei, while in 1835 he made sacrifices together with Yishao, Prince Ding of the First Rank. In 1839, Mianyu was promoted to the prince of the first rank. In 1840, he performed Grand Sacrificial Rites twice.

=== Military career ===
In 1851, Mianyu was appointed as a commander of Manchu forces of the Bordered Yellow Banner and was entrusted with managing the affairs of the Gioro family school. In 1856, when Second Opium War broke out, Mianyu was in charge of administration of Beijing and was vested with powers of Generalissimus Possessing a Mandate, which meant that he would be one of the commanders of Eight Banner Forces. When Sengge Rinchen suffered several defeats in Tongzhou, Mianyu sent emergency so as to protect Five Capitals (places where Qing dynasty emperors used to reside during the imperial tours). In 1853, when Taiping rebellion started, Xianfeng Emperor did not issue any decrees ordering Mianyu and Sengge Rinchen to take action using armed forces despite the fact that losses of Qing forces could be less. The main reason of this decision could be belief that Europeans were regarded as inferior nation in comparison to Manchurians and Chinese. However, when the rebels organised Northern Expedition (Taiping Rebellion), Sengge Rinchen's cavalry was sent to defeat the rebels.

=== Death and succession ===
Apart from military successes, Mianyu is credited with literary work named "Series of the Airi Study" (《爱日寨集》). He was one of the teachers of the young Zaichun, the Tongzhi Emperor. Empress Dowager Cixi and Empress Dowager Ci'an had him in high regard, mostly due to his moral character considered the most upright in his generation. Mianyu died on 9 January 1866 and was succeeded by his eldest son Yixiang.

== Family ==
Mianyu was initially married to Lady Guwalgiya, daughter of fifth rank literary official Bolin'e (博林额) since 1828. In 1837, he married another Lady Guwalgiya, daughter of Guiliang (桂良) and elder sister of Princess Consort Gongzhong of the First Rank (Yixin's wife). Through the marriage with Lady Guwalgiya and Lady Hesheri, Mianyu was correlated with the most prominent Manchu clans.

Primary Consort

- First primary consort, of the Gūwalgiya clan (嫡福晋 瓜尔佳氏, d. 1835)
  - First son (15 March 1835 – 17 March 1835)
- Second primary consort, of the Gūwalgiya clan (继福晋 瓜尔佳氏, d. 1852)
  - Yixiang (奕详, 15 March 1849 – 13 February 1886), fifth son

Secondary Consort

- Secondary consort, of the Hešeri clan (侧福晋 赫舍里氏, d. 13 April 1860)
- Secondary consort, of the Yang clan (侧福晋 杨氏)
  - Prince of the Fourth Rank Yimo (奕谟, 22 May 1850 – 17 August 1905), sixth son
- Secondary consort, of the Ligiya clan (侧福晋 李佳氏)
  管女子-->惠亲王侧福晋
  - Second son (22 December 1838)
- Secondary consort, of the Xiegiya clan (侧福晋 谢佳氏)
  - Yicheng (奕诚, 7 April 1845 – 15 April 1847), third son
  - Grace Defender Duke Yixun (奕询, 6 March 1849 – 16 August 1871), fourth son
