= Prince Hui (first rank) =

Prince Hui of the First Rank

Chinese name
- Traditional Chinese: 和碩惠親王
- Simplified Chinese: 和硕惠亲王
Transcriptions
Standard Mandarin
- Hanyu Pinyin: héshuò huì qīnwáng
- Wade–Giles: ho-shuo hui ch'in-wang

Manchu name
- Manchu script: ᡥᠣᡧᠣᡳ ᡶᡠᠯᡝᡥᡠᠨ ᠴᡳᠨ ᠸᠠᠩ
- Romanization: hošoi fulehun cin wang

Prince Hui of the First Rank, or simply Prince Hui, was the title of a princely peerage used in China during the Manchu-led Qing dynasty (1644–1912). As the Prince Hui peerage was not awarded "iron-cap" status, this meant that each successive bearer of the title would normally start off with a title downgraded by one rank vis-à-vis that held by his predecessor. However, the title would generally not be downgraded to any lower than a feng'en fuguo gong except under special circumstances.

The first bearer of the title was Mianyu (綿愉; 1814–1865), the Jiaqing Emperor's fifth son, who was made "Prince Hui of the First Rank" in 1839. The title was passed down over three generations and held by three persons.

== Members of the Prince Hui peerage ==
Members of the Prince Hui peerage
- Mianyu (綿愉; 8 Mar 1814 – 9 Jan 1865; 1st), the Jiaqing Emperor's fifth son, made a second-rank prince in 1820, promoted to first-rank prince under the title "Prince Hui of the First Rank" in 1839, posthumously honoured as Prince Hui Duan of the First Rank (惠端親王).
  - 3 Yicheng (奕誠; 7 Apr 1845 – 15 Apr 1847)
  - 4 Yixun (奕詢; 6 Mar 1849 – 16 Aug 1871), made a lesser bulwark duke in 1856, promoted to grace defender duke in 1864.
    - (a) Zaize (1868 – 1929), Yicheng's (3rd son of Mianxiu, fourth of Prince Yu line) son and Yixun's adopted son, initially a grace bulwark duke from 1877 to 1894, promoted to grace defender duke in 1894, made an acting beizi in 1908.
      - Puying (溥偀)
  - 5 Yixiang (奕詳; 15 Mar 1849 – 13 Feb 1886; 2nd), made a lesser bulwark duke in 1860, promoted to grace defender duke in 1864, succeeded the peerage under the title Prince Hui of the Second Rank from 1865 to 1886, made an acting first-rank prince in 1872, posthumously honoured as Prince Hui Jing of the Second Rank (惠敬郡王)
    - 1 Zairun (載潤; 14 Aug 1878 – 6 Jul 1963; 3rd), succeeded the peerage under the title of a beile from 1886 to 1945. After the People's Republic of China established, he was served as a librarian of Beijing's Research Institute of Literature and History.
      - 1 Puyou (溥佑; born 1909)
        - Yuhuan (毓峘; born 1936)
      - 2 Puzhong (溥仲)
    - 2 Zaiji, adopted as Yimo's son (see below Yimo's line).
    - Zaiguang (載光), Yicheng's son, held the title of a fengguo jiangjun
  - 6 Yimo (奕謨; 22 May 1850 – 17 Aug 1905), Mianyu's sixth son, made a buru bafen zhenguo gong in 1856, promoted to feng'en zhenguo gong in 1864, made an acting beizi in 1872, promoted to beizi in 1884, made an acting beile in 1889
    - (a) Zaiji (載濟; 1880 – 1894), Yixiang's second son and Yimo's adopted son, held the title of a third class defender general from 1886 to 1894.
      - (a) Pujie (溥佶; 1889–1926), 2nd son of Zaiguang (Zaize's biological brother), supporter general and Zaiji's adopted son, made a grace defender duke in 1905.
        - 1 Yusong (毓崧; born 11 Sep 1909), made a grace bulwark duke in 1927.
          - Hengshu (恆樞)
    - (a) Zaitao (23 June 1887 – 2 September 1970), Yixuan's 7th son and Yimo's adopted son, initially a second class defender general, promoted to lesser defender duke in 1894, transferred to the Prince Zhong peerage in 1898 and made an acting beizi

== Family tree ==
Family tree

adoption
Xuanye 玄燁 (1654–1722); Kangxi Emperor 康熙帝 (1661–1722)
Yinzhen 胤禛 (1678–1735); Yongzheng Emperor 雍正帝 (1722–1735)	Yunxu 允禑 (1693–1731); Prince Yuke of the Second Rank 愉恪郡王 (1730–1731)
Hongli 弘曆 (1711–1799); Qianlong Emperor 乾隆帝 (1735–1796)	Hongqing 弘慶 (1724–1769); Prince Yugong of the Second Rank 愉恭郡王 (1731–1769)
Yongyan 顒琰 (1760–1820); Jiaqing Emperor 嘉慶帝 (1796–1820)	Yongjian 永珔 (1766–1820); Beile 貝勒 (1770–1820)
Mianyu 綿愉 (1814–1865); Prince Huiduan of the First Rank 惠端親王 (1839–1865)	Mianxiu 綿岫 (1782–1850); Beizi 貝子 (1821–1850)
Yixun 奕詢 (1849–1871); Feng'en Zhenguo Gong 奉恩鎮國公 (1864–1871)	Yixiang 奕詳 (1849–1886); Prince Huijing of the Second Rank and Acting Qinwang 親王銜惠敬郡王 (1872–1886)	Yimo 奕謨 (1850–1905); Beizi and Acting Beile 貝勒銜貝子 (1889–1905)	Yicheng 奕棖; Second Class Fuguo Jiangjun 二等輔國將軍
Zaize 載澤 (1868–1929); Feng'en Zhenguo Gong and Acting Beizi 貝子銜奉恩鎮國公 (1908–1929)	Zairun 載潤 (1878–1963); Beile 貝勒 (1886–1945)	Zaiji 載濟 (1880–1894); Third Class Zhenguo Jiangjun 三等鎮國將軍 (1886–1894)	Zaiguang 載光; Fengguo Jiangjun 奉國將軍
Puyou 溥佑 (1909–?)	Pujie 溥佶 (1888–1926); Feng'en Zhenguo Gong 奉恩鎮國公 (1905–1926)
Yuhuan 毓峘 (1936–?)	Yusong 毓崧 (1909–?); Feng'en Fuguo Gong 奉恩輔國公 (1927–?)

== See also ==
- Prince Yu (愉)
- Royal and noble ranks of the Qing dynasty
