= Alut clan =

Manchu-Mongol clan and family name

Chinese name
- Chinese: 阿鲁特氏
Transcriptions
Standard Mandarin
- Hanyu Pinyin: ā lǔ tè shì

Manchu name
- Manchu script: ᠠᠯᡠᡨ
- Möllendorff: Alut

Pronunciation respelling name
- Pronunciation respelling: AH-LOOT

Alut is a clan and family name of Qing dynasty. The clan initially belonged to the Mongol Plain Blue Banner, but was later transferred to Manchu Bordered Yellow Banner, one of the upper banners of the Eight Banners. Some descendants of the clan adopted surname Ke (克).

== Notable figures ==
=== Males ===
Dexing (德兴)

- Jinghui (景辉), a top candidate on provincial examination (翻译举人, pinyin:fangyu juren)
  - Saišangga (賽尚阿/赛尚阿; 1794–1875), served as the Minister of Works from 1841 to 1845
    - Chongqi (崇綺/崇绮; 1829–1900), the top candidate in the 1865 imperial examination, served as a fourth rank literary official (侍講) in the Hanlin Academy, the Minister of Revenue from 1884 to 1886 and in 1900 and the Minister of Personnel in 1886, and held the title of a third class duke (三等公)
    - Chonggang (崇纲), a fifth rank literary official (员外郎)
      - Kechang (克昌)

Prince Consort

| Prince Consort | Princess | Sons | Daughters |
|---|---|---|---|
| Chongqi | Lady Aisin Gioro, a daughter of Duanhua | 1 | Empress Xiaozheyi |

=== Females ===
Imperial Consort

- Empress
  - Empress Xiaozheyi (1854–1875), the Tongzhi Emperor's empress
- Imperial Noble Consort
  - Imperial Noble Consort Gongsu (1857–1921), the Tongzhi Emperor's consort

== Family tree ==
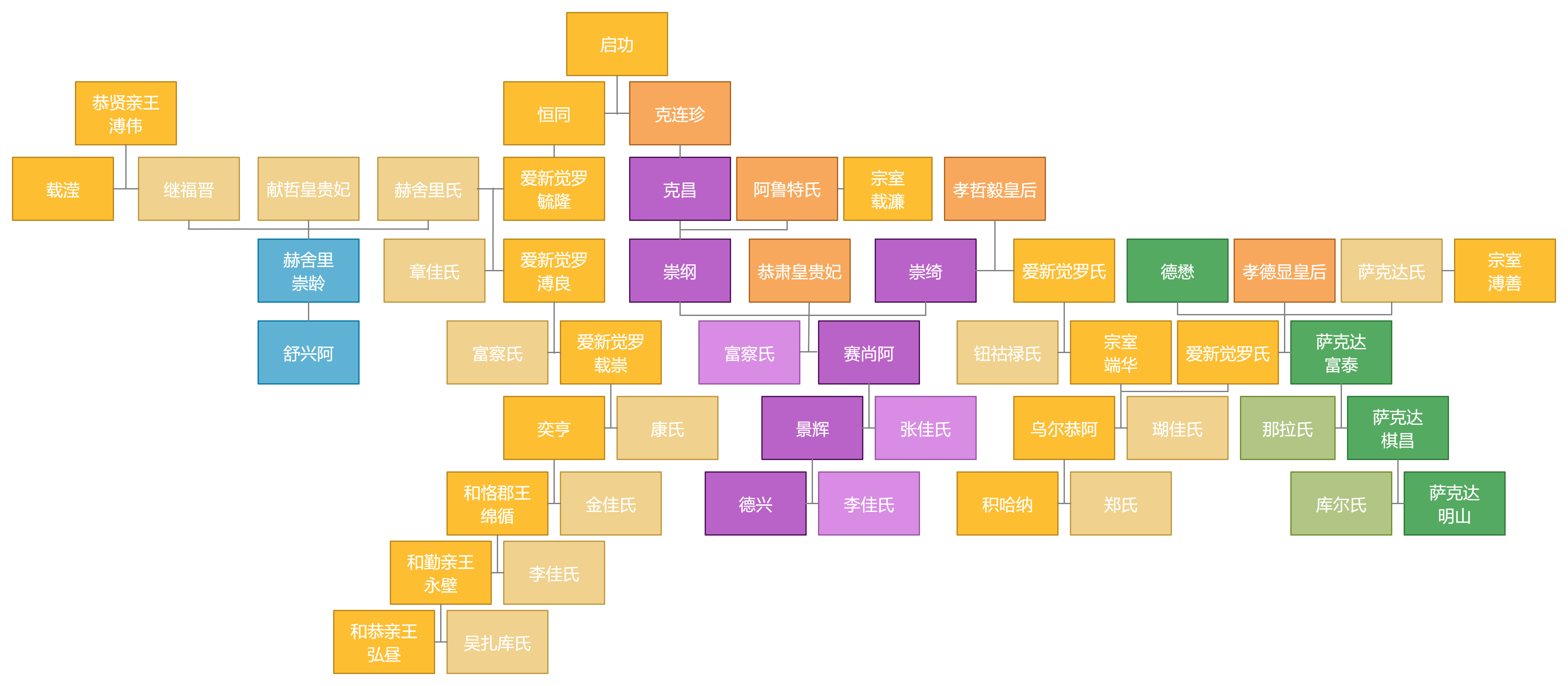
Colligations and family tree of Alut clan

== Gallery ==
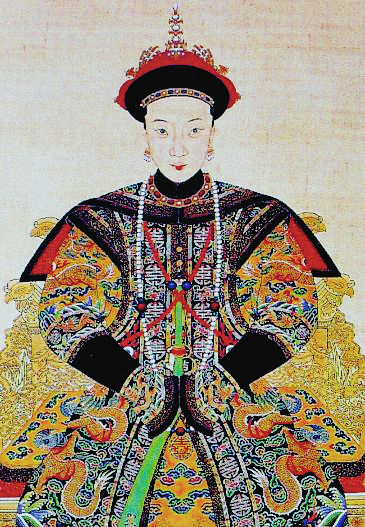
Empress Xiaozheyi in court dress

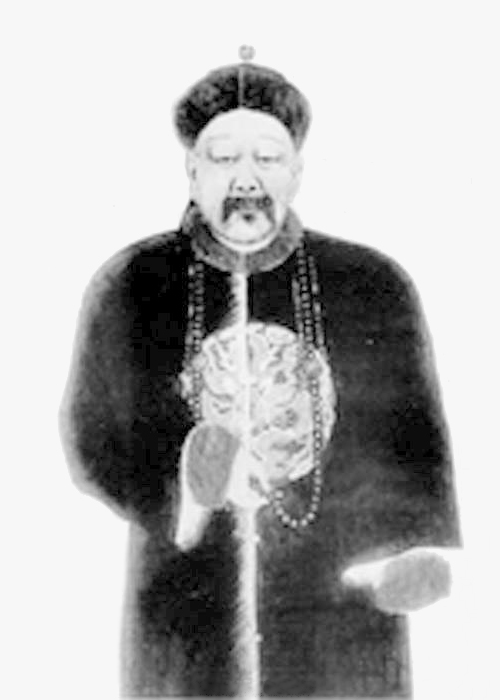
Baochu, brother of Empress Xiaozheyi (1934 illustration)

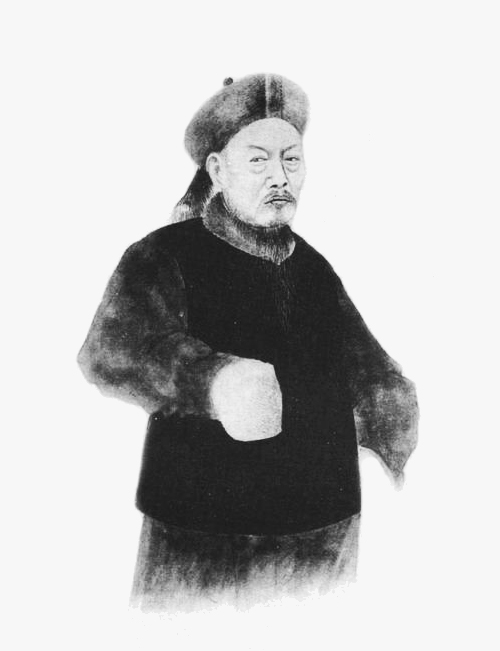
Chongqi, father of Empress Xiaozheyi (1934 illustration)
