= Consort He (Daoguang) =

Consort of the Daoguang Emperor (died 1836)

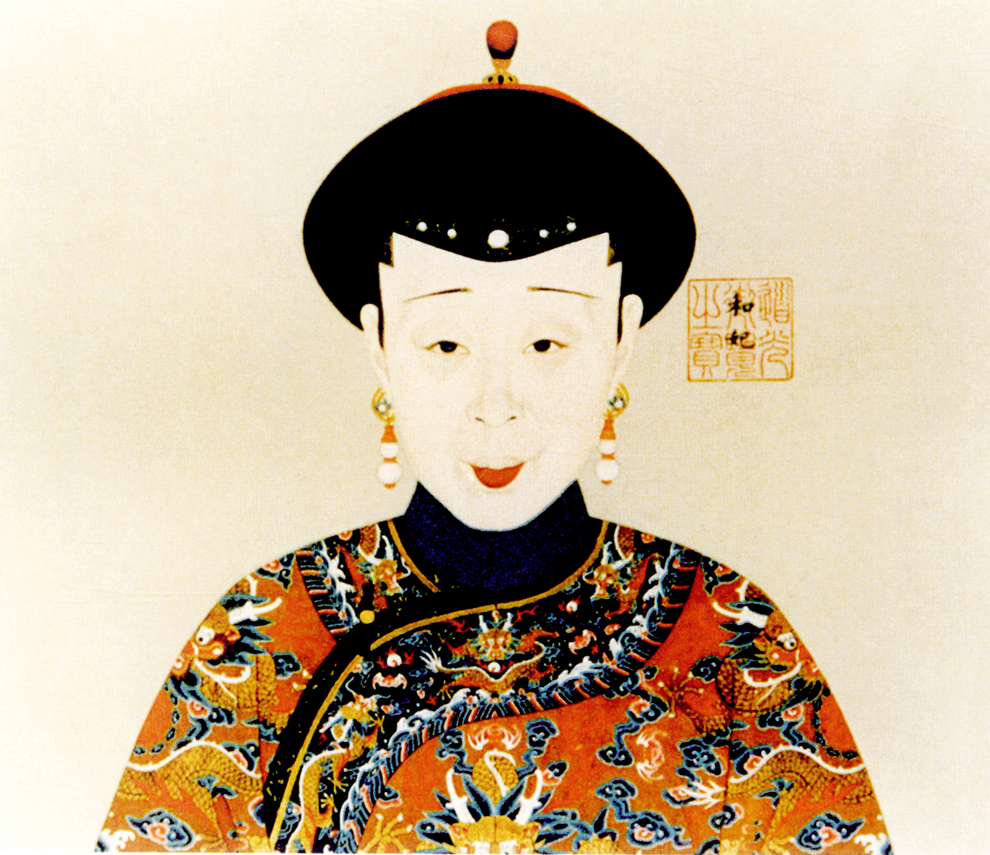
- Qing Dynasty portrait of Consort He
- Died: 18 May 1836 (道光十六年 四月 四日); Forbidden City
- Burial: Mu Mausoleum, Western Qing tombs
- Spouse: Daoguang Emperor (before 1836)
- Issue: Yiwei
- House: Hoifa Nara (輝發那拉; by birth); Aisin Gioro (by marriage)

Consort He
- Traditional Chinese: 和妃
- Simplified Chinese: 和妃
Transcriptions
Standard Mandarin
- Hanyu Pinyin: Hé Fēi

Consort He (died 18 May 1836), of the Manchu Plain White Banner Hoifa Nara clan, was a consort of the Daoguang Emperor.

== Life ==
=== Family background ===
Consort He's personal name was not recorded in history. She was a Booi Aha of the Plain White Banner by birth.

- Father: Chengwen (成文), served as a fifth rank literary official (郎中)

=== Jiaqing era ===
It is not known when Lady Hoifa Nara became a lady-in-waiting of Minning, the second son of the Jiaqing Emperor. On 16 May 1808, she gave birth to his first son, Yiwei. In May 1808, she was elevated to his secondary consort.

=== Daoguang era ===
The Jiaqing Emperor died on 2 September 1820 and was succeeded by Minning, who was enthroned as the Daoguang Emperor. She resided in the Yanxi Palace. On 28 December 1822, Lady Hoifa Nara was granted the title "Concubine He". In December 1823, she was elevated to "Consort He". Even though her son Yiwei was the Daoguang Emperor's only son at some point, Consort He never rose above the rank of Consort. Five years after the death of Yiwei, she died on 18 May 1836 from kidney problems and was interred in the Mu Mausoleum of the Western Qing tombs.

== Titles ==
- During the reign of the Qianlong Emperor (r. 1735–1796) or the Jiaqing Emperor (r. 1796–1820):
  - Lady Hoifa Nara
- During the reign of the Jiaqing Emperor (r. 1796–1820):
  - Lady-in-waiting (官女子)
  - Secondary consort (側福晉; from May 1808)
- During the reign of the Daoguang Emperor (r. 1820–1850):
  - Concubine He (和嬪; from 28 December 1822), fifth rank consort
  - Consort He (和妃; from December 1823), fourth rank consort

== Issue ==
- As a lady-in-waiting:
  - Yiwei (奕緯; 16 May 1808 – 23 May 1831), the Daoguang Emperor's first son

== See also ==
- Ranks of imperial consorts in China § Qing
- Royal and noble ranks of the Qing dynasty
