= Empress Xiaozheyi =

Empress consort of China (1872-1875)

- Empress Jiashun
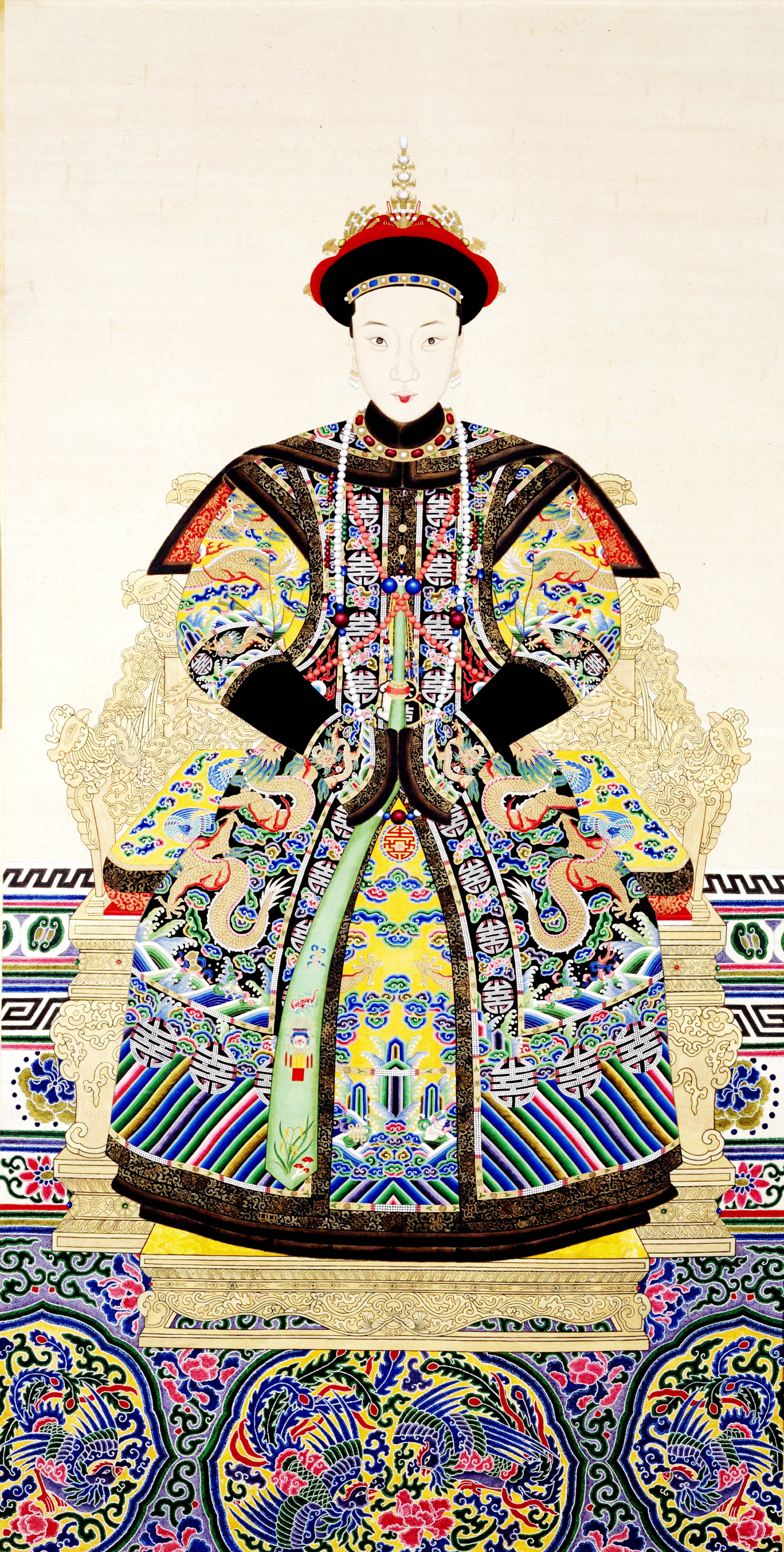
- Qing Dynasty portrait of Empress Xiaozheyi c.1873

Empress consort of the Qing dynasty
- Tenure: 15 October 1872 – 12 January 1875
- Predecessor: Empress Xiaozhenxian
- Successor: Empress Xiaodingjing
- Born: 25 July 1854 (咸豐四年 七月 一日); Beijing
- Died: 27 March 1875 (aged 20) (光緒元年 二月 二十日); Chuxiu Palace, Forbidden City
- Burial: Hui Mausoleum, Eastern Qing tombs
- Spouse: Tongzhi Emperor (m. 1872; died 1875)
Posthumous name
- Empress Xiaozhe Jiashun Shushen Xianming Gongduan Xiantian Zhangsheng Yi (孝哲嘉順淑慎賢明恭端憲天彰聖毅皇后)
- House: Alut (阿魯特)
- Father: Chongqi
- Mother: Lady Aisin Gioro

Empress Xiaozheyi

Chinese name
- Traditional Chinese: 孝哲毅皇后
- Simplified Chinese: 孝哲毅皇后
Transcriptions
Standard Mandarin
- Hanyu Pinyin: Xiàozhéyì Huánghòu

Manchu name
- Manchu script: ᡥᡳᠶᠣᠣᡧᡠᠩᡤᠠ ᠰᡠᠯᡨᡠᠩᡤᠠ ᡶᡳᠯᡳᠩᡤᠠ ᡥᡡᠸᠠᠩᡥᡝᠣ
- Romanization: hiyoošungga sultungga filingga hūwangheo

Empress Xiaozheyi (25 July 1854 – 27 March 1875), of the Manchu Bordered Yellow Banner Alut clan, was a posthumous name bestowed to the wife and empress consort of Zaichun, the Tongzhi Emperor. She was empress consort of the Qing dynasty from 1872 until her husband's death in 1875, after which she was honoured as Empress Jiashun.

== Life ==
=== Family background ===
Empress Xiaozheyi's personal name was not recorded in history. Her family originally belonged to the Mongol Plain Blue Banner.

- Father: Chongqi (崇綺/崇绮; 1829–1900), the top candidate in the 1865 imperial examination, served as a fourth rank literary official (侍講/侍讲) in the Hanlin Academy, was the Minister of Revenue from 1884 to 1886 and in 1900, and the Minister of Personnel in 1886, and held the title of a third class duke (三等公)
  - Paternal grandfather: Saišangga (賽尚阿/赛尚阿; 1794–1875), served as the Minister of Works from 1841 to 1845
  - Paternal grandmother: Lady Fuca
  - Paternal aunt: Imperial Noble Consort Gongsu (1857–1921)
- Mother: Lady Aisin Gioro
  - Maternal grandfather: Duanhua (1807–1861), held the title Prince Zheng of the First Rank from 1846 to 1861
  - Maternal grandmother: Lady Niohuru, Empress Xiaozhenxian's aunt
  - Maternal great aunt: Lady Aisin Gioro, the mother of Empress Xiaodexian (1831–1850)
- Younger brother: Baochu, Minister of the Imperial Household Department (d.1900)
- A younger sister, the secondary consort of Yixiang, Prince Hui (second rank)

=== Xianfeng era ===
The future Empress Xiaozheyi was born on the first day of the seventh lunar month in the fourth year of the reign of the Xianfeng Emperor, which translates to 25 July 1854 in the Gregorian calendar.

Lady Alut was tutored by her father since she was young, and she demonstrated high potential and intelligence as a child. She also showed interest and talent in poetry, literature, music, and art. Under the tutelage of her father, she learned to write with both hands. She was famous among the Manchu aristocracy for her talent, moral character, and looks.

=== Tongzhi era ===
In 1872, Lady Alut was chosen to be empress consort by the Tongzhi Emperor. She was specially chosen to help in the reconciliation of rivals in the Qing imperial court. Lady Alut's maternal grandfather, Duanhua, was a former political rival of the emperor's mother, Empress Dowager Cixi.

It was said that there was an argument between the Empresses Dowager Cixi and Ci'an over the choice of empress. Ci'an, who favored Lady Alut, claimed that the empress should possess high moral standards, while Cixi felt that the empress should be wise and shrewd. The conflict was resolved by the Tongzhi Emperor when he eventually chose Lady Alut to be his empress. Cixi was displeased with her son's decision. Another four candidates chosen became the emperor's concubines. One of them was Lady Alut's aunt, Concubine Xun.

Empress Dowager Cixi once complained about Lady Alut:

"We made a mistake in selecting a wife for him. How could we tell that her beauty was false? She was very beautiful, but she hated us."

On the night of 15 October 1872, at around 11:30 pm (an auspicious hour recommended by imperial astrologers), Lady Alut left her family residence for the Forbidden City. Her furniture – a bed, a mirror, two wardrobes, chairs and eight marriage chests – had symbolically preceded her. After their marriage, the Tongzhi Emperor evidently preferred his empress over his four other consorts, spending almost every night with her, while the four consorts waited in vain for the Emperor to summon them.

Empress Dowager Cixi was unhappy about the unfair treatment of the emperor's other consorts and she turned hostile towards the Empress. She warned the Empress that, as primary wife, she should allow the emperor to spend time equally among his consorts, and to not seize him for herself. Cixi also reminded the Empress that since both she and the Tongzhi Emperor were still young, they should spend more time learning how to govern the country. When she saw no signs of change in her son's attitude, Cixi eventually ordered the Emperor and Empress to be separated, so that they could focus more on learning how to become ruling sovereigns.

The Tongzhi Emperor could not cope well with loneliness so he grew more ill-tempered over time. Once, a eunuch secretly suggested to the Emperor to sneak out of the Forbidden City and visit brothels. As a result, it was assumed that the Emperor contracted syphilis. Empress Dowager Cixi regarded this incident as a humiliating scandal, so she warned the imperial physicians to remain silent about it. The physicians lied that the Emperor was ill with smallpox and prescribed medicine and treatment for smallpox.

A court official, Yun Yuting, wrote in his memoirs that the Empress visited the Tongzhi Emperor on his sickbed while he complained about his mother's interfering and domineering ways. She was looking forward to the day the Emperor recovered and they could live and rule together. Empress Dowager Cixi, tipped off by eunuchs, entered the room in stockinged feet, and hearing the Empress's criticisms, flew into a rage and rampaged through the room, seized the Empress by the hair and hit her, shouting that by making love to the Emperor she would cause him to be ill again. She ordered the eunuchs to take her away and slap her on the face.

=== Guangxu era ===
The Tongzhi Emperor died on 12 January 1875. Some sources claim that the Empress was pregnant at the time. The Tongzhi Emperor had not chosen a successor before his death, so it was up to Empress Dowager Cixi to decide who would be the new emperor. Cixi chose her nephew Zaitian, who was enthroned as the Guangxu Emperor.

The Empress was not mentioned in the crisis over the succession; neither was she granted the title of Empress Dowager, which was customary after the death of an emperor. She received the title "Empress Jiashun" instead. Within 100 days of the death of the Tongzhi Emperor, Empress Dowager Cixi pushed the blame of the emperor's death on Empress Jiashun. She ordered Empress Jiashun's food rations to be reduced. Empress Jiashun wrote a letter to her father asking for help, but his reply was simply, "Your Highness knows what to do." It was said that the empress committed suicide but official court records state that she died after a long and serious illness. Empress Dowager Cixi granted her the posthumous title "Empress Xiaozheyi".

In 1876, a censor to the throne wrote that Empress Xiaozheyi should be posthumously honored for being a virtuous wife who had committed suicide after her husband's death. Empress Dowager Cixi rebuked him curtly for writing a memorial suggesting an unnatural death.

In 1900, when the Eight-Nation Alliance invaded Beijing, Empress Dowager Cixi asked Empress Xiaozheyi's father, Chongqi, to remain behind and take charge of state affairs. Chongqi and his family committed suicide after the capital fell to the foreigners.

== Titles ==
- During the reign of the Xianfeng Emperor (r. 1850–1861):
  - Lady Alut (from 25 July 1854)
- During the reign of the Tongzhi Emperor (r. 1861–1875):
  - Empress (皇后; from 15 October 1872)
- During the reign of the Guangxu Emperor (r. 1875–1908):
  - Empress Jiashun (嘉順皇后; from 12 January 1875)
  - Empress Xiaozheyi (孝哲毅皇后; from June/July 1875)

== In fiction and popular culture ==
- Portrayed by Lee Ching in The Rise and Fall of Qing Dynasty (1990)
- Portrayed by Mi Yang in Sigh of His Highness (2006)
- Portrayed by Natalie Tong in The Confidant (2012)

== See also ==
- Ranks of imperial consorts in China#Qing
- Royal and noble ranks of the Qing dynasty

== Notes ==
Empress Xiaozheyi Alut clan
Chinese royalty
Preceded by Empress Xiaozhenxian of the Niohuru clan	Empress consort of China; 15 October 1872 – 12 January 1875	Succeeded by Jingfen, Empress Xiaodingjing of the Yehe-Nara clan
