= Tongzhi Emperor =

Emperor of China from 1861 to 1875

Tongzhi Emperor 同治帝
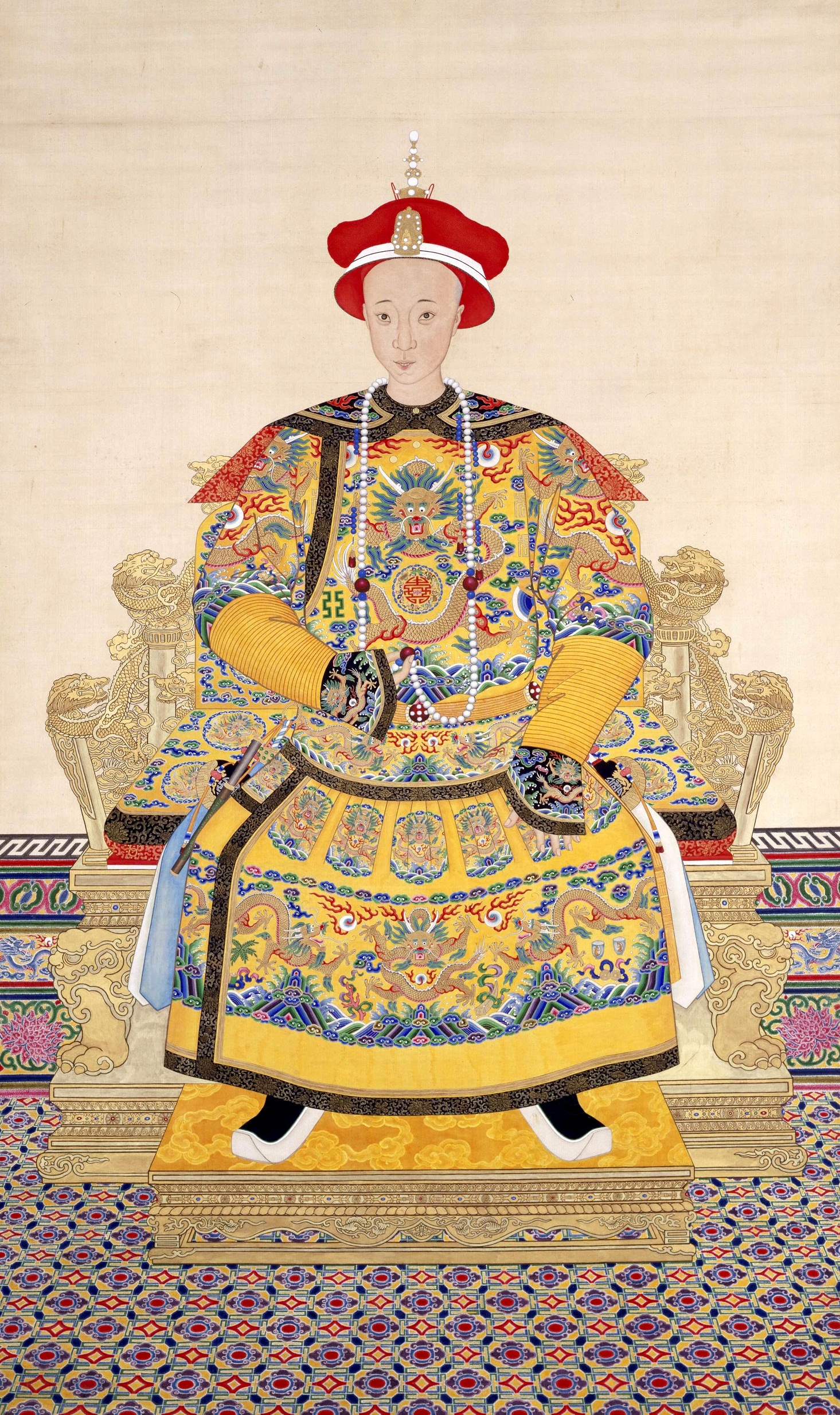

Emperor of the Qing dynasty
- Reign: 11 November 1861 – 12 January 1875 (13 years, 62 days)
- Predecessor: Xianfeng Emperor
- Successor: Guangxu Emperor
- Regents: List: 1861: Zaiyuan Duanhua Sushun Jingshou Muyin Kuang Yuan Du Han Jiao Youying; 1861–1865: Yixin, Prince Gong; 1861–1875: Empress Dowager Ci'an Empress Dowager Cixi
- Born: 27 April 1856; Chuxiu Palace, Forbidden City (in present-day Beijing)
- Died: 12 January 1875 (aged 18); Yangxin Hall, Forbidden City
- Burial: Hui Mausoleum, Eastern Qing tombs
- Consort: Empress Xiaozheyi (m. 1872)
Names
- Zaichun (載淳); Manchu: Dzai šun (ᡯᠠᡳ ᡧᡠᠨ)
Era dates
- Tongzhi (同治): 30 January 1862 – 5 February 1875; Manchu: Yooningga dasan (ᠶᠣᠣᠨᡳᠩᡤᠠ ᡩᠠᠰᠠᠨ); Mongolian: Бүрэн засагч (ᠪᠦᠷᠢᠨ ᠵᠠᠰᠠᠭᠴᠢ)
Posthumous name
- Emperor Jitian Kaiyun Shouzhong Juzheng Baoda Dinggong Shengzhi Chengxiao Xinmin Gongkuan Mingsu Yi (繼天開運受中居正保大定功聖智誠孝信敏恭寬明肅毅皇帝); Manchu: Abka be Siraha, Forgon be Badarambuha, Dulimba be Jafaha, Tob be Tuwakiyaha, Amba be Karmaha, Gungge be Toktobuha, Enduringge Mergengge, Unenggi Hiyoošun, Akdun Ulhisu, Gungnecuke Onco Filingga Hūwangdi (ᠠᠪᡴᠠ ᠪᡝ ᠰᡳᡵᠠᡥᠠ᠈ ᡶᠣᡵᡤᠣᠨ ᠪᡝ ᠪᠠᡩᠠᡵᠠᠮᠪᡠᡥᠠ᠈ ᡩᡠᠯᡳᠮᠪᠠ ᠪᡝ ᠵᠠᡶᠠᡥᠠ᠈ ᡨᠣᠪ ᠪᡝ ᡨᡠᠸᠠᡴᡳᠶᠠᡥᠠ᠈ ᠠᠮᠪᠠ ᠪᡝ ᡴᠠᡵᠮᠠᡥᠠ᠈ ᡤᡠᠩᡤᡝ ᠪᡝ ᡨᠣᡴᡨᠣᠪᡠᡥᠠ᠈ ᡝᠨᡩᡠᡵᡳᠩᡤᡝ ᠮᡝᡵᡤᡝᠩᡤᡝ᠈ ᡠᡝᠨᠩᡤᡳ ᡥᡳᠶᠣᠣᡧᡠᠨ᠈ ᠠᡴᡩᡠᠨ ᡠᠯᡥᡳᠰᡠ᠈ ᡤᡠᠩᠨᡝᠴᡠᡴᡝ ᠣᠨᠴᠣ ᡶᡳᠯᡳᠩᡤᠠ ᡥᡡᠸᠠᠩᡩᡳ)
Temple name
- Muzong (穆宗); Manchu: Mudzung (ᠮᡠᡯ᠊ᡠ᠊ᠩ)
- House: Aisin-Gioro
- Dynasty: Qing
- Father: Xianfeng Emperor
- Mother: Empress Xiaoqinxian

Chinese name
- Traditional Chinese: 同治帝
- Simplified Chinese: 同治帝
Transcriptions
Standard Mandarin
- Hanyu Pinyin: Tóngzhì Dì
- Wade–Giles: Tʻung^{2}chi^{4} Ti^{4}
- IPA: [tʰʊ̌ŋʈʂî tî]

The Tongzhi Emperor (27 April 1856 – 12 January 1875), also known by his temple name Emperor Muzong of Qing, personal name Zaichun, was the ninth emperor of the Qing dynasty, and the eighth Qing emperor to rule over China proper. His reign, which effectively lasted through his adolescence, was largely overshadowed by the rule of Empress Dowager Cixi. Although he had little influence over state affairs, the events of his reign gave rise to what historians call the "Tongzhi Restoration", an unsuccessful modernization program.

The only surviving son of the Xianfeng Emperor, he ascended the throne at the age of five under a regency headed by his biological mother Empress Dowager Cixi and his legal mother Empress Dowager Ci'an. The Self-Strengthening Movement, in which Qing officials pursued radical institutional reforms following the disasters of the Opium Wars and the Taiping Rebellion, began during his reign. The Tongzhi Emperor assumed personal rule over the Qing government in 1873, but he had no interest in affairs of state and immediately came into conflict with his ministers. He was outmaneuvered by the dowager empresses.

He died of smallpox at the age of 18 in 1875, following unsuccessful medical treatments; his death without a male heir created a succession crisis. In contravention to Qing's dynastic custom, his double first cousin assumed the throne as the Guangxu Emperor.

== Life ==
The only surviving son of the Xianfeng Emperor and Empress Dowager Cixi, the Tongzhi Emperor was namesake to the attempted political reform initiated by his mother, called the Tongzhi Restoration. His era name was originally proposed as "Qixiang" (祺祥; Manchu: Fengšengge sabingga), but this was later changed upon his succession to "Tongzhi". The era name means 'order and prosperity' coming from the Confucian teaching that "there are many ways of being a good government, and they can all be summarized as order and prosperity".

The Tongzhi Emperor became emperor at the age of five upon the death of his father, the Xianfeng Emperor. His father's choice of a regent, Sushun, was removed in favor of a partnership between his mother Empress Dowager Cixi and Empress Dowager Ci'an.

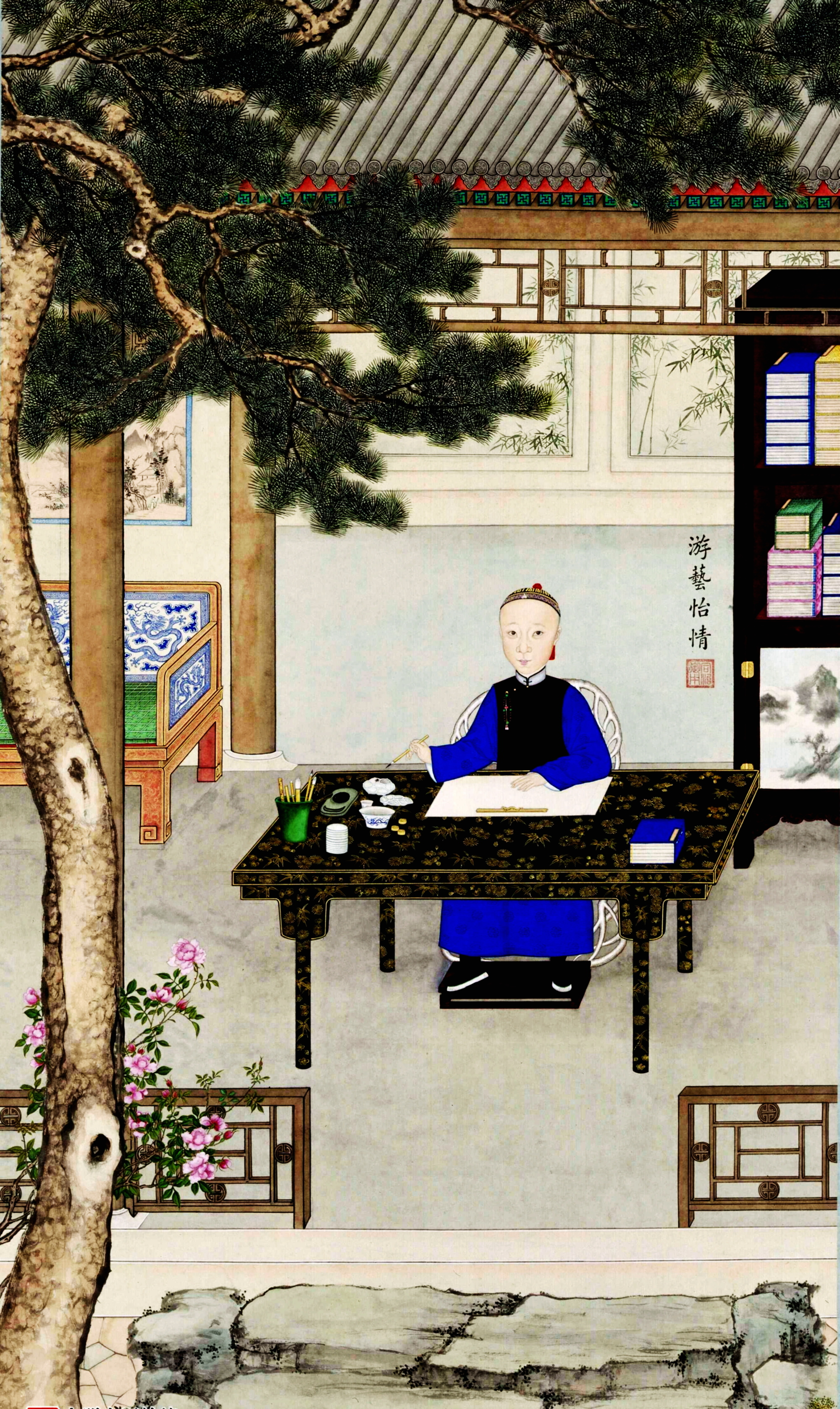
The Tongzhi Emperor writing

While there had most likely been hopes that the Tongzhi Emperor would become a successful leader like the Kangxi Emperor (who ascended the throne as a child in 1661), those hopes would soon be disappointed, as the Tongzhi Emperor grew up to become an obstinate and dissolute young man who also expressed his dissatisfaction with his mother Empress Cixi.

Tongzhi Emperor
- Chinese: 同治帝
Transcriptions
Standard Mandarin
- Hanyu Pinyin: Tóngzhì Dì
- Wade–Giles: Tʻung^{2}-chih^{4} Ti^{4}
- IPA: [tʰʊ̌ŋʈʂî tî]

In the fall of 1872, he married Empress Xiaozheyi and two official concubines. The Tongzhi Emperor apparently had wanted to take up power immediately, prompting a quarrel at court regarding the dismantling of the regency and the timing of it. However, the two empresses dowager stuck by the intended date of February 23, 1873.

The day after the Tongzhi Emperor took power, foreigners requested an audience with him. The request precipitated a sharp disagreement between the ministers at the foreign legations, who made it clear that they would not perform the ritual kowtow to the emperor, and the Zongli Yamen (foreign affairs ministry), regarding the protocol to be observed. The Qing government was also loath to hold the audience within the confines of the Forbidden City, eventually settling on the "Pavilion of Purple Light" at one of the lakeside palaces to the west of the Forbidden City, which is now part of Zhongnanhai. The audience was finally held on 29 June 1873. After the audience, however, the foreign representatives made clear their annoyance at being received in a hall initially used by the Qing emperors to receive envoys of tributary states.

In the fall of 1874, the Tongzhi Emperor got into a clash with his ministers, which included his two uncles, Prince Gong and Prince Chun, largely over the emperor's plans to rebuild the Old Summer Palace at a time in which the empire was bankrupt, and over his dissolute behavior. The emperor reacted by firing the ministers, but Empresses Dowager Ci'an and Cixi intervened, and he had them reinstated. That December, it was announced that he was ill with smallpox, and the Empress Dowagers resumed the regency. He died on 12 January 1875, leaving no sons to succeed him.

The Tongzhi Emperor's death left the court in a succession crisis as he was childless. Eventually, the empresses dowager designated the Tongzhi Emperor's three-year-old cousin, Zaitian, as the heir to the throne. Zaitian was biologically Prince Chun's son, but was symbolically adopted as the Xianfeng Emperor's son to make him eligible to succeed the Tongzhi Emperor. Zaitian was thus enthroned as the Guangxu Emperor, with Empresses Dowager Ci'an and Cixi resuming their roles as regents. Empress Alute, Tongzhi's wife, died shortly after her husband. The cause of her death is unclear.

== Self-strengthening movement ==
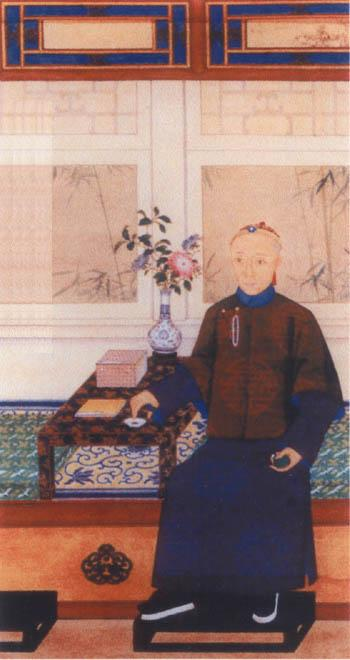
Emperor Tongzhi

The inspiration for the future Self-Strengthening Movement arose from the notion that China's defense in the face of war and rebellion must come from within, as the superior man strengthens himself under imperative of Heaven's robust action. The costs of war and rebellion dictated that the Qing dynasty undertake vigorous measures to ensure its survival. Moreover, the very survival of China itself was now at stake.

Self-strengthening efforts evolved in a succession of stages over a period of almost half a century. In 1840 Imperial Commissioner Lin Zexu, impressed by the power of British warships in the initial battles of the Opium War, advocated adoption of Western naval technology. The paddle-wheel steamer Nemsis had run circles around cumbersome Chinese war junks. Some Chinese at first believed the paddle-wheels were powered by men inside the ship, but soon came to appreciate the power of steam, Commissioner Lin was the first self-strengthener.

Self-strengthening enterprises, including arsenals, shipyards, and technical schools, were now established in the principal treaty ports where access to Western technology was most direct. By 1860, the overwhelming bulk of the Chinese scholarly class had become cognizant of the enormity of changes that were taking place due to the increasingly prevalent Western presence in China. They now proclaimed that change was irresistible and advocated for deeper studies of Western technology. Many reforms were proposed and implemented such as the Self-Strengthening Movement, but ultimately the failure of reforms was due to multiple factors such as political machinations.

== Family ==
- Empress Xiaozheyi (孝哲毅皇后), of the Alut clan (阿魯特氏; 25 July 1854 – 27 March 1875)
- Imperial Noble Consort Shushen (淑慎皇貴妃), of the Fuca clan (富察氏; 24 December 1859 – 13 April 1904)
- Imperial Noble Consort Gongsu (恭肅皇貴妃), of the Alut clan (阿魯特氏; 20 September 1857 – 14 April 1921)
- Imperial Noble Consort Xianzhe (獻哲皇貴妃), of the Hešeri clan (赫舍里氏; 2 July 1856 – 3 February 1932)
- Imperial Noble Consort Dunhui (敦惠皇貴妃), of the Sirin-Gioro clan (西林覺羅氏; 6 September 1856 – 18 May 1933)

== See also ==
- Family tree of Chinese monarchs (late)
- Dungan Revolt (1862–1877)

Tongzhi Emperor House of Aisin-Gioro Born: 27 April 1856 Died: 12 January 1875
Regnal titles
Preceded by Xianfeng Emperor	Emperor of the Qing dynasty Emperor of China; 11 November 1861 – 12 January 1875	Succeeded by Guangxu Emperor
