= Jingrong (Yehenara) =

Yehenara Jingrong
- State Duchess of the First Rank acting as Princess Consort of the Fourth Rank
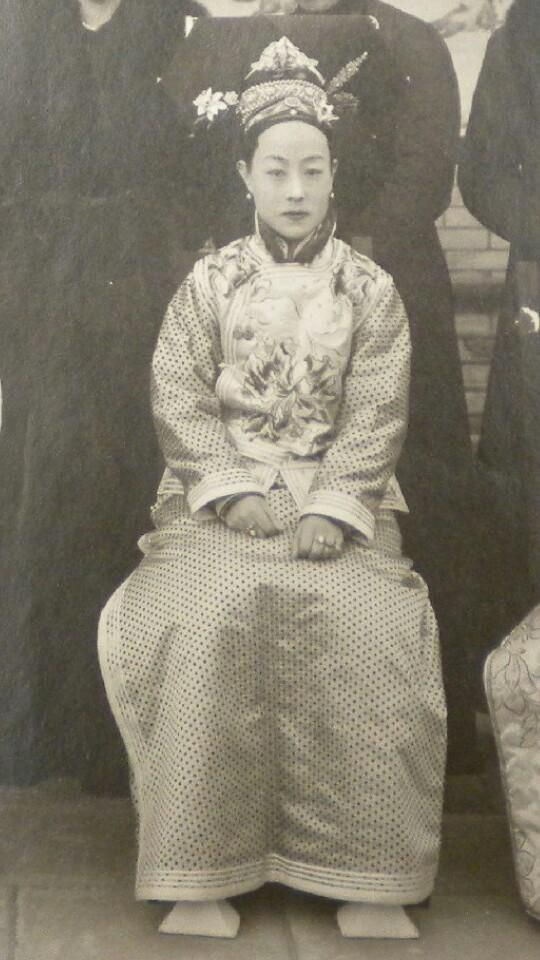
- Born: 16 June 1866
- Died: 12 July 1933 (aged 67)
- Spouse: Zaize (m. 1894–1929)
- Father: Guixiang
- Mother: Lady Aisin Gioro

Lady Yehenara (嫡夫人 叶赫那拉氏, 16 June 1866 - 12 July 1933) was primary consort of Zaize, 5th generation descendant of Yunxu, Prince Yuke of the Second Rank and Kangxi Emperor's 15th surviving son. She was two years older than him. Her personal name was Jingrong (静荣, meaning "still glory").

== Life ==
=== Family background ===
Jingrong was a member of the Bordered Blue Banner lineage of the Yehe-Nara clan.Both her father and grandfather held a title of third class duke Cheng'en (承恩公) as their daughters were honoured as empresses.

- Guixiang (桂祥; 1849–1913), served as first rank military official (都統), and held the title of a third class duke (三等公)
  - Paternal grandfather: Huizheng (惠徵; 1805–1853), held the title of a third class duke (三等公)
  - Paternal grandmother: Lady Fuca
  - First paternal uncle: Zhaoxiang (照祥)
  - Third paternal uncle: Fuxiang (福祥)
  - Paternal aunt: Empress Xiaoqinxian (Xingzhen (杏贞), 1835–1908), the mother of the Tongzhi Emperor (1856–1875)
  - Paternal aunt: Wanzhen (1841–1896), the mother of the Guangxu Emperor (1871–1908)
- Mother: Lady Aisin Gioro
- Two brothers: Deheng (德恒) and Deqi (德棋)
- Two younger sisters
  - First younger sister: Jingfen (1868-1913), Empress Xiaodingjing
  - Second younger sister: Yehenara Jingfang (d.1898), primary Princess Consort Shunchengzhi of the Second Rank

=== Tongzhi era ===
Lady Yehenara was born on 16 June 1866.

=== Guangxu era ===
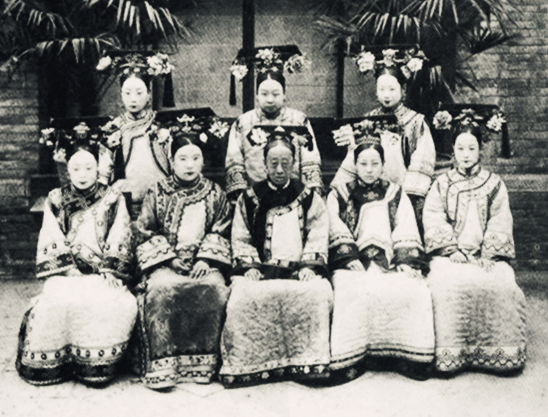
Jingrong is the first lady from the right; together with Gurun Princess Rongshou and another princesses consorts

In 1894, Jingrong became a wife of grace bulwark duke Zaize, adopted son of Yixun, the second in Prince Hui of the first rank, at the age of 28. Although Zaize requested to choose a date of his wedding in 1888, when Jingrong had attended the Elegant Women Selection and had been officially approved as his primary consort by Empress Dowager Cixi, the wedding was delayed until 1894. Zaize was promoted to grace defender duke after the marriage. Her marriage turned as a successful one. Jingrong was admired by Zaize for her beauty, youthfulness and kindness. Apart from her, Zaize took lady Liu and lady Zhu as concubines.

The main motive of Cixi's choice was desire to strengthen ties between her maternal family and imperial clan.Jingrong's paternal aunt, Wanzhen, became princess consort Chun of the first rank in 1860s, her first younger sister was instated as an empress of the Guangxu Emperor, while her second younger sister married Nalehe, Prince Shuncheng of the Second Rank in 1889

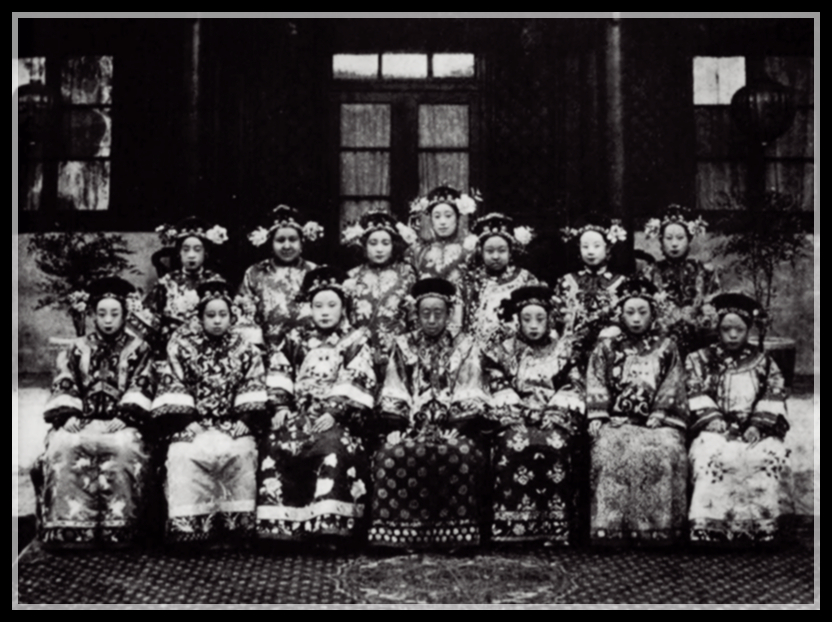
Together with Gurun Princess Rongshou and another princesses consorts

As a supporter of Hundred Days' Reform, Zaize was neither executed nor stripped of his privileges, which might have affected Jingrong. Jingrong was one of the pioneers of teaching foreign languages in Qing dynasty China, as she met many foreigners after 1900. She adopted European outfits together with another princesses consorts of Zaize. Under her supervision, the ducal manor was undergoing reconstruction in order to adapt the estate to innovations of XIX century. Her actions were inspired by 1905 investigation tour to European countries, United States and Japan.

=== Xuantong era ===
In 1908, Zaize was granted a status of the prince of the fourth rank together with Jingrong, which meant that they could receive stipends and use garments befitting prince of the fourth rank though remaining grace defender duke and state duchess of the first rank respectively.

=== After the demise of Qing dynasty ===
After Xinhai Revolution broke out in 1911, Zaize resigned from his appointments but retained noble title. In 1924, when Puyi was evicted from the Forbidden City, all imperial clansmen followed suit. Jingrong continued to live with Zaize until June 1929. Jingrong died on 12 July 1933 at the age of 67.
