= Jingfang =

Jingfang is a Romanization of several Chinese personal names. Notable people with the name include:

- Li Jingfang (1854-1934), Chinese statesman
- Yehenara Jingfang (fl. 1890), primary consort of the Prince Shuncheng of the Second Rank Nelehe
- Hao Jingfang (born 1984), Chinese science fiction writer
