= Yehenara Jingfang =

Yehe Nara Jingfang
- Princess Consort Shunchengzhi of the Second Rank
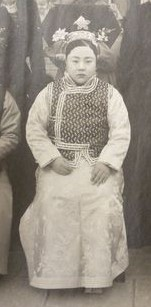
- Jingfang in daily dress
- Born: Yehe Nara Jingfang (叶赫那拉 静芳)
- Died: Prince Shuncheng Mansion
- Spouse: Nelehe (m. 1890)
- Issue: none
Names
- Yehe Nara Jingfang (叶赫那拉 静芳)
- House: Yehe Nara (葉赫那拉; by birth); Aisin Gioro (by marriage)
- Father: Guixiang
- Mother: Lady Aisin Gioro

Lady Yehenara (嫡福晋 叶赫那拉氏) was primary consort of the Prince Shuncheng of the Second Rank Nelehe, 16th-generation descendant of Lekdehun, Daišan's grandson and Nurhaci's great-grandson. Her personal name was Jingfang (静芳, meaning "still fragrance").

== Life ==
=== Family background ===
Jingfang was a member of the Bordered Blue Banner lineage of the Yehe-Nara clan.

- Guixiang (桂祥; 1849–1913), served as first rank military official (都統), and held the title of a third class duke (三等公)
  - Paternal grandfather: Huizheng (惠徵; 1805–1853), held the title of a third class duke (三等公)
  - Paternal grandmother: Lady Fuca
  - First paternal uncle: Zhaoxiang (照祥)
  - Third paternal uncle: Fuxiang (福祥)
  - Paternal aunt: Empress Xiaoqinxian (1835–1908), the mother of the Tongzhi Emperor (1856–1875)
  - Paternal aunt: Wanzhen (1841–1896), the mother of the Guangxu Emperor (1871–1908)
- Mother: Lady Aisin Gioro
- Two brothers: Deheng (德恒) and Deqi (德棋)
- Two elder sisters:
  - First elder sister: Jingrong (静荣) (1866-1933), wife of Zaize, state duchess of the first rank
  - Second elder sister: Jingfen (静芬;1868-1913), Empress Dowager Longyu

=== Guangxu era ===
It was not known when was lady Yehenara born. It was said that she was beloved niece of Empress Dowager Cixi. In 1889, she attended Elegant Women Selection together with her sisters. Jingfang married Prince Shuncheng of the Second Rank, Nalehe as a primary princess consort. Apart from her, Nalehe did not have any other concubines.

The main motive of Cixi's choice was desire to strengthen ties between her maternal family and imperial clan. Her paternal aunt, Wanzhen, became princess consort Chun of the first rank, her elder sister, Jingrong, married Zaize, 5th generation descendant of Yunxu, Prince Yuke of the Second Rank and Kangxi Emperor's 15th surviving son, while her second elder sister was instated as an empress of the Guangxu Emperor.

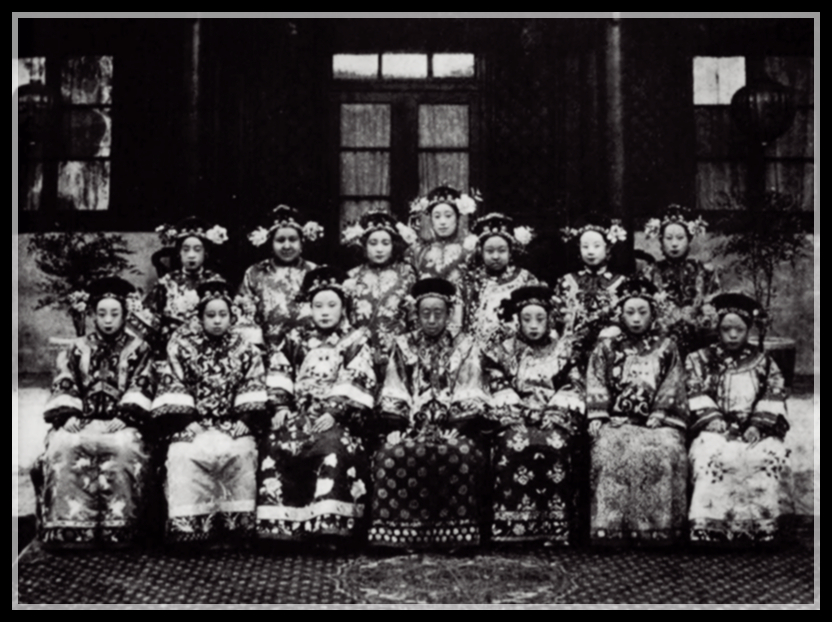
Jingfang is third from left

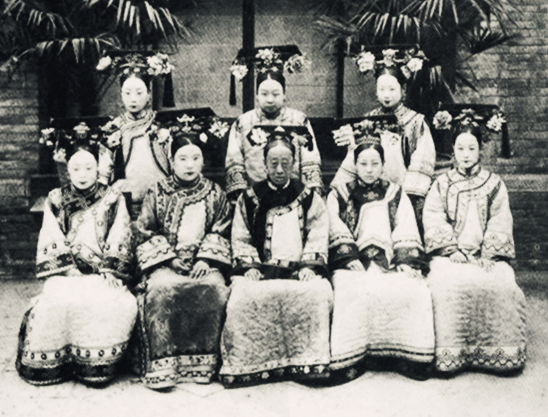
Jingfang is the lady second from left

Lady Yehenara remained childless and died in 1908.

=== Controversy with marriage ===
Early sources claimed that lady Yehenara married Zaishu, a member of Prince Fu peerage. However, imperial genealogy (玉牒) states that it was daughter of Zhaoxiang, Jingfang's first paternal uncle, who was wed to Zaishu and bore two daughters (Yunrong (韫荣) and wife of Tsewang Duanlub, Jasagh of the Aohan league). Another sources mentioned that Jingfang was married to Zaiyi, Yicong's son. According to "Genealogy of the Aisin-Gioro clan", Zaiyi had two spouses, including lady Irgen Gioro and lady Borjigit (daughter of Gongsangzhu'ermote of the Alxa league).
