= Empress Dowager Longyu =

Empress of China from 1889 to 1908

Empress Xiaodingjing
- Empress Dowager Longyu
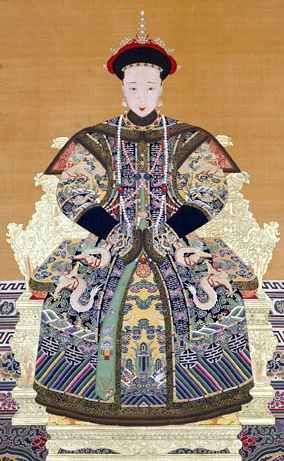
- Portrait of Empress Xiaodingjing, made during her time as empress c.1890

Regent of the Qing dynasty
- Regency: 14 November 1908 – 12 February 1912 (3 years, 90 days)
- Monarch: Xuantong Emperor

Empress consort of the Qing dynasty
- Tenure: 26 February 1889 – 14 November 1908 (19 years, 262 days)
- Predecessor: Empress Xiaozheyi
- Successor: Monarchy abolished (Empress Xiaokemin as titular empress)

Empress dowager of the Qing dynasty
- Tenure: 14 November 1908 – 12 February 1912 (3 years, 90 days)
- Predecessor: Empress Xiaoqinxian
- Successor: Monarchy abolished
- Born: 28 January 1868 (同治七年 正月 四日); Beijing, China
- Died: 22 February 1913 (aged 45); Taiji Hall, Forbidden City, China
- Burial: Chong Mausoleum, Western Qing tombs
- Spouse: Guangxu Emperor (m. 1889; died 1908)
- Issue: Xuantong Emperor (adopted)
Posthumous name
- Empress Xiaoding Longyu Kuanhui Shenzhe Xietian Baosheng Jing; Chinese: 孝定隆裕寬惠慎哲協天保聖景皇后; Manchu:ᡥᡳᠶᠣᠣᡧᡠᠩᡤᠠ ᡨ᠋ᠣᡴ᠋ᡨ᠋ᠣᠩᡤᠣ ᠠᠮᠪᠠᠯᡳᠩᡤᡡ ᡥᡡᠸᠠᠩᡥᡝᠣ
- House: Yehe Nara (葉赫那拉)
- Father: Guixiang
- Mother: Lady Aisin Gioro

Empress Dowager Longyu
- Chinese: 隆裕太后
Transcriptions
Standard Mandarin
- Hanyu Pinyin: Lóngyù tàihòu

Empress Yehe Nara (28 January 1868 – 22 February 1913), of the Manchu Bordered Yellow Banner Yehe Nara clan, was the wife and empress consort of Zaitian, the Guangxu Emperor. She was empress consort of Qing from 1889 until her husband's death in 1908, after which she was honoured as Empress Dowager Longyu. She was posthumously honoured with the title Empress Xiaodingjing.

She became regent during the minority of Puyi, the Xuantong Emperor, from 1908 until 1912. On behalf of the Emperor, she signed the letter of abdication, effectively ending two thousand years of imperial Chinese history.

== Life ==
=== Family background ===
- Father: Guixiang (桂祥; 1849–1913), served as first rank military official (都統), and held the title of a third class duke (三等公)
  - Paternal grandfather: Huizheng (惠徵; 1805–1853), held the title of a third class duke (三等公)
  - Paternal grandmother: Lady Fuca
  - Paternal aunt: Empress Xiaoqinxian (1835–1908), the mother of the Tongzhi Emperor (1856–1875)
  - Paternal aunt: Wanzhen (1841–1896), the mother of the Guangxu Emperor (1871–1908)
- Mother: Lady Aisin Gioro
- Two brothers
- One elder sister, Jingrong (Yehenara) (1866–1933), and one younger sister, Yehenara Jingfang

=== Tongzhi era ===
Lady Yehe Nara was born on the fourth day of the first lunar month in the seventh year of the reign of the Tongzhi Emperor, which translates to 28 January 1868 in the Gregorian calendar.

=== Guangxu era ===
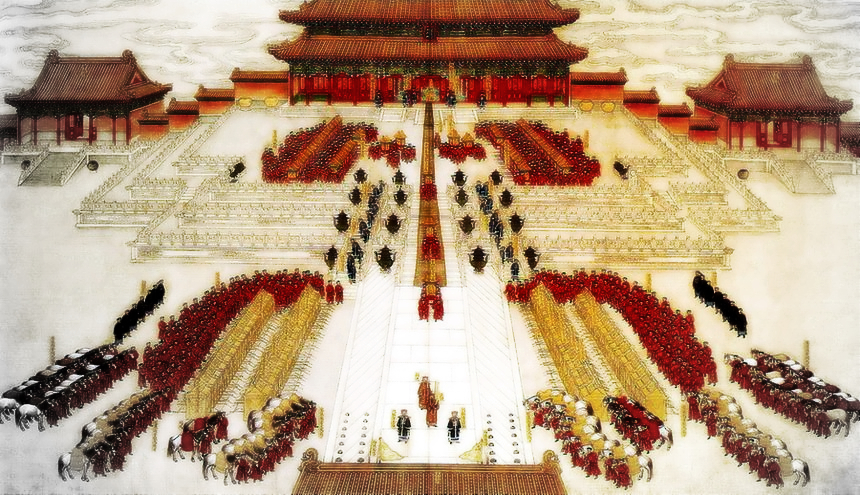
Wedding of the Guangxu Emperor and Empress Yehe Nara

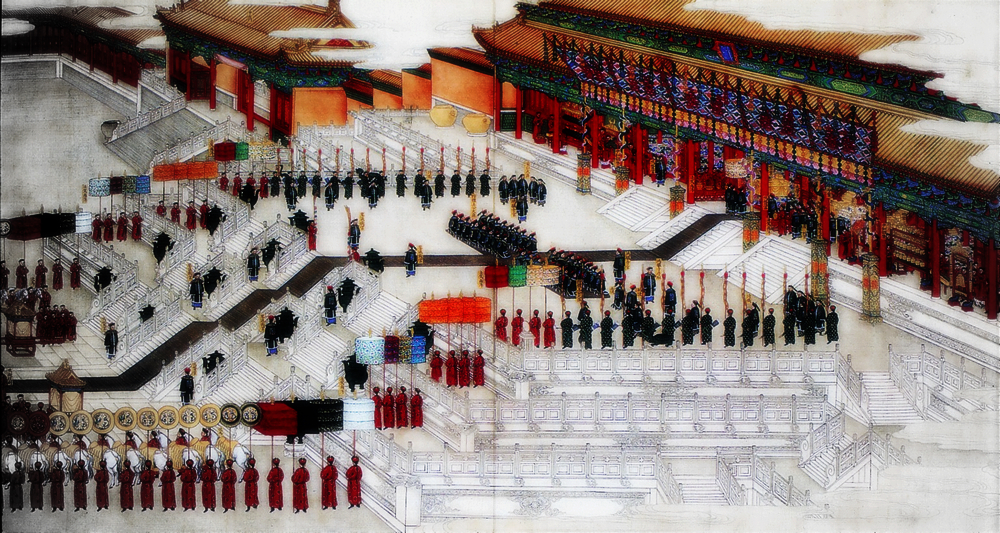
Wedding of the Guangxu Emperor and Empress Yehe Nara

In 1889, Cixi, who served as regent during the Guangxu Emperor's minority, decided that the emperor had to marry before he could formally take over the reins of power. She chose her niece, Guixiang's daughter, to be the primary wife of the Guangxu Emperor because she wanted to strengthen the influence of the Yehe Nara clan within the imperial family.

Jingfen married the Guangxu Emperor on 26 February 1889, and became his empress directly after the wedding. The wedding ceremony was an extremely extravagant and spectacular occasion. On 16 January 1889, the Forbidden City had caught fire, and the Gate of Supreme Harmony burnt down. According to imperial traditions, the route of the Emperor's wedding procession had to pass through the Gate of Supreme Harmony, which was completely destroyed. As a result, many people believed that this incident was a bad omen.

Because the reconstruction of the gate would be extremely time-consuming, and the wedding date of the Emperor could not be postponed once decided, Cixi ordered the construction of a tent resembling the gate. The artisans used paper and wood to build it, and after it was done, the tent had exactly the same height and width as the original gate, with ornamentation extremely similar to the original. At first, even people who regularly walked through the inner palace could not tell the difference between the original gate and the temporary tent.

After their marriage, the Empress was detested and ignored by the Guangxu Emperor, who favoured Consort Zhen of the Tatara clan. At first, Cixi regarded Zhen favourably, but after finding out she had overspent her allowance, and meddled in political appointments, she demoted her. Cixi eventually grew more hostile to Zhen, and placed her in the "cold palace". (Note: Rumours were circulated that Zhen was put under house arrest because she supported the Guangxu Emperor's political reforms, but documents confirm that Zhen was already demoted by the time the emperor started his reforms in 1898.)

As she firmly opposed the Guangxu Emperor's 1898 Hundred Days' Reform programme, Cixi had the emperor placed under house arrest in the Summer Palace. The Empress frequently spied on the Guangxu Emperor and reported his every action to Cixi. In 1900, during the Boxer Rebellion, the Empress fled with Cixi and the Guangxu Emperor to Xi'an when Beijing was occupied by the forces of the Eight-Nation Alliance.

Both Yu Deling and Katharine Carl, who spent time in Cixi's court following the Boxer Rebellion, recalled Empress Jingfen as a gracious and pleasant figure.

=== Xuantong era ===
The Guangxu Emperor and Cixi died one day apart in 1908, after which Jingfen was promoted to empress dowager, with the honorary name "Longyu", meaning "auspicious and prosperous".

Immediately after the Guangxu Emperor's death, Cixi appointed Puyi, a nephew of the Guangxu Emperor, as the new emperor. As Empress Dowager Longyu did not have any children with the Guangxu Emperor, she adopted the infant Puyi as her child. Although Cixi had decreed before her death that the Qing imperial court would never again allow women to serve as regents, Longyu remained the leading figure in the Qing government and was consulted on all major decisions. But because she was inexperienced in politics, in the first few years of Puyi's reign, the emperor's biological father, Zaifeng (Prince Chun), served as Puyi's regent alongside General Yuan Shikai.

On Yuan Shikai's advice in the fall of 1911, Empress Dowager Longyu agreed to sign an abdication on behalf of five-year-old Puyi. She agreed only if the imperial family were allowed to keep its titles. Other agreements were these:

- The imperial family could keep their possessions.
- They could stay in the Forbidden City temporarily, then would eventually move to the Summer Palace.
- They would receive an annual stipend of four million silver taels.
- The imperial mausoleums would be protected and looked after.
- The new government would pay for the Guangxu Emperor's funeral and the construction of his tomb.

=== Republican era ===
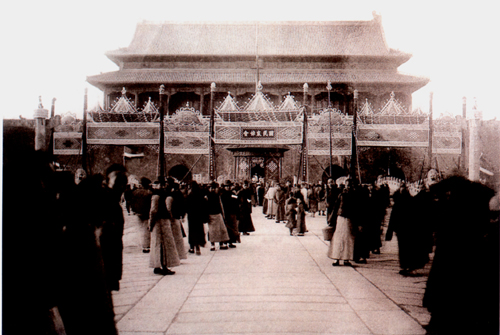
Empress Dowager Longyu's funeral procession at Tiananmen in 1913.

The Qing dynasty came to an end in 1912 and was replaced by the Republic of China. Barely a year after the fall of the Qing dynasty, on 22 February 1913, Empress Dowager Longyu died in Beijing after an illness. She was 45 years old, and was the only Chinese empress whose coffin was transported from the Forbidden City to her tomb by train. At her funeral, the Vice President of the Republic of China, Li Yuanhong, praised her for being "most excellent among women". She was buried in the Chong Mausoleum of the Western Qing tombs with the Guangxu Emperor.

== Titles ==
- During the reign of the Tongzhi Emperor (r. 1861–1875):
  - Lady Yehe Nara (from 28 January 1868)
- During the reign of the Guangxu Emperor (r. 1875–1908):
  - Empress (皇后; from 26 February 1889)
- During the reign of the Xuantong Emperor (r. 1908–1912):
  - Empress Dowager Longyu (隆裕皇太后; from 14 November 1908)
- During the years of the Republic of China (1912–1949):
  - Empress Xiaodingjing (孝定景皇后; from 1913)

== Gallery ==
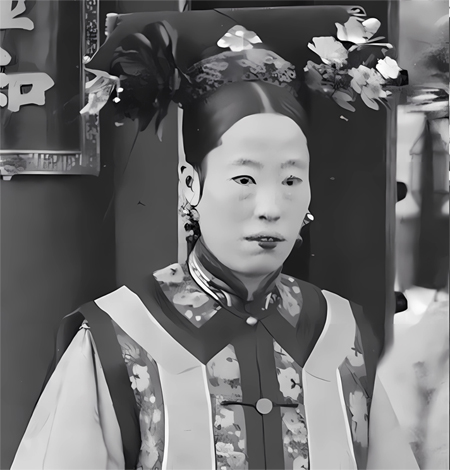
As empress consort

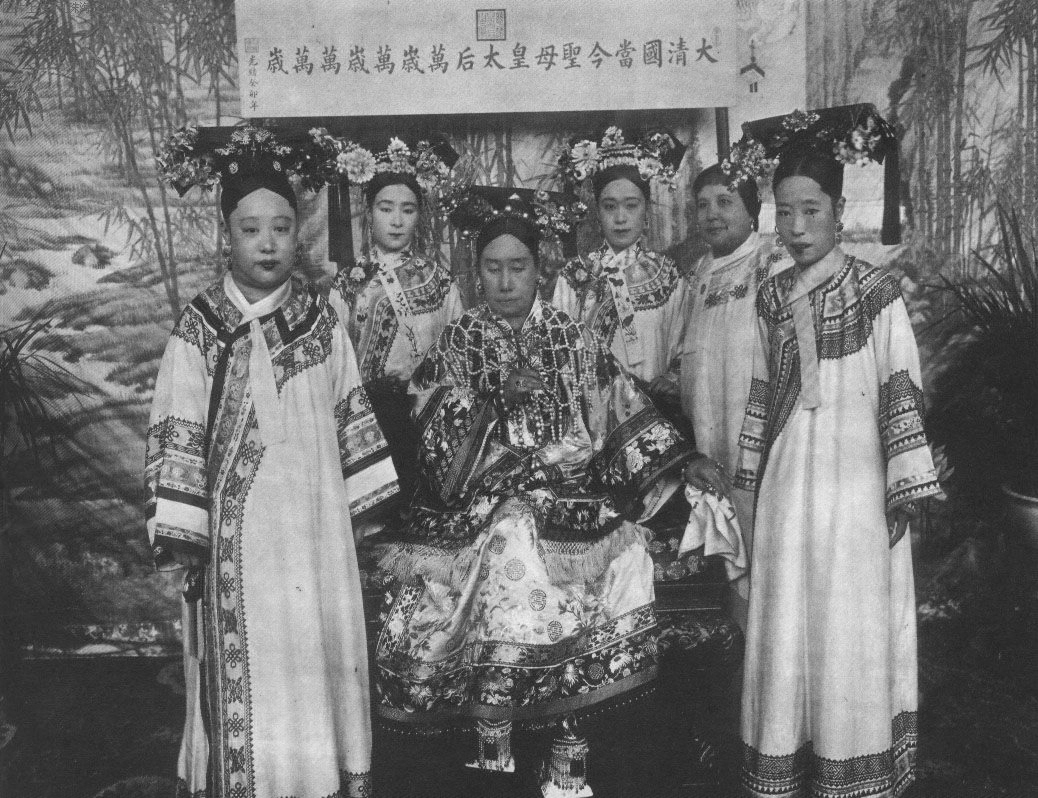
As part of Empress Dowager Cixi's entourage (furthest right).

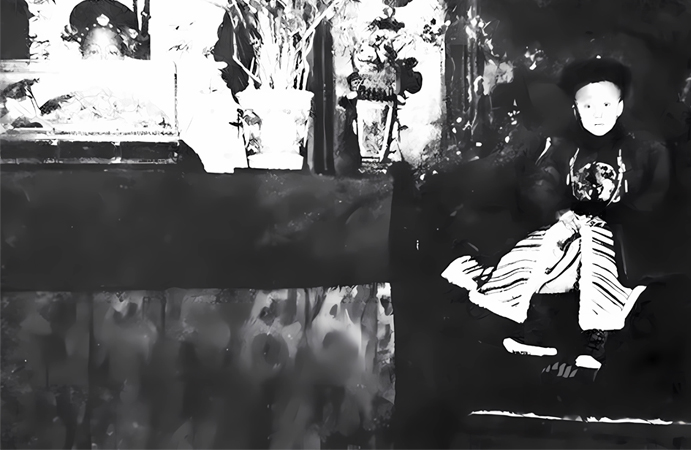
Young Puyi, the Xuantong Emperor and Empress Dowager Longyu

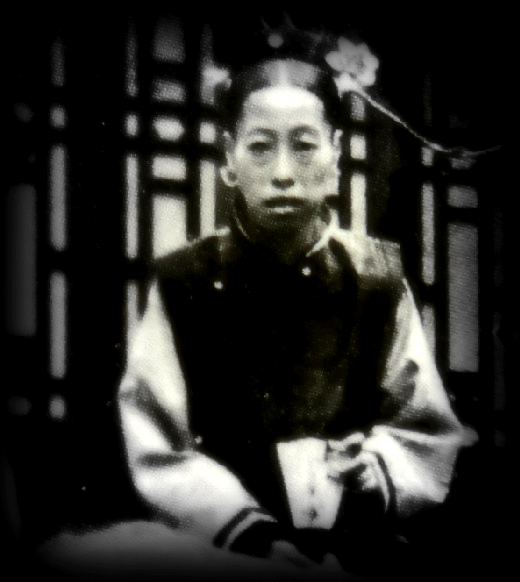
In her later years.

== In fiction and popular culture ==
- Portrayed by Lin Jing in Sorrows of the Forbidden City (1948)
- Portrayed by Ivy Ling Po in The Empress Dowager (1975) and The Last Tempest (1976)
- Portrayed by Liang Yuejun in The Last Emperor (1987)
- Portrayed by Gong Lijun in Li Lianying: The Imperial Eunuch (1991)
- Portrayed by Suet Lei in The Rise and Fall of Qing Dynasty (1992)
- Portrayed by Jiang Nan in Towards the Republic (2003)
- Portrayed by Yan Zi in Princess Der Ling (2006)
- Portrayed by Fan Bingbing in The Founding of a Party (2011)
- Portrayed by Joan Chen in 1911 (2011)
- Portrayed by Li Sheng in The First President (2011)
- Portrayed by Kara Wai in Legend of the Last Emperor (2014)
- Portrayed by Pauline Chow in The Last Healer in Forbidden City (2016)
- Portrayed by Zhao Ziqi in The Master of Cheongsam (2021)

== See also ==
- Ranks of imperial consorts in China#Qing
- Royal and noble ranks of the Qing dynasty
- Yehe Nara clan

== Notes ==
Empress Dowager Longyu Yehe Nara Clan
Chinese royalty
Preceded by Empress Xiaozheyi of the Arute clan	Empress consort of China; 26 February 1889 – 14 November 1908	Vacant until monarchy abolished in 1912; Empress Xiaokemin as titular empress consort
Preceded by Xingzhen, Empress Dowager Cixi (Xiaoqinxian) of the Yehe-Nara clan	Empress dowager of China; 14 November 1908 – 12 February 1912	Monarchy abolished
Titles in pretence
Preceded by Monarchy abolished	— TITULAR — Empress dowager of China; 12 February 1912 – 22 February 1913	Vacant
