= Prince Shuncheng =

Prince Shuncheng of the Second Rank
- Traditional Chinese: 多羅順承郡王
- Simplified Chinese: 多罗顺承郡王
Transcriptions
Standard Mandarin
- Hanyu Pinyin: duōluó shùnchéng jùnwáng
- Wade–Giles: to-lo shun-ch'eng chün-wang

Prince Shuncheng of the First Rank
- Traditional Chinese: 和碩順承親王
- Simplified Chinese: 和硕顺承亲王
Transcriptions
Standard Mandarin
- Hanyu Pinyin: héshuò shùnchéng qīnwáng
- Wade–Giles: ho-shuo shun-ch'eng ch'in-wang

Prince Shuncheng of the Second Rank (Manchu: ᡩᠣᡵᠣᡳ
ᡩᠠᡥᠠᠰᡥᡡᠨ
ᡤᡳᠶᡡᠨ
ᠸᠠᠩ doroi dahashūn cin wang), or simply Prince Shuncheng, was the title of a princely peerage used in China during the Manchu-led Qing dynasty (1644–1912). It was also one of the 12 "iron-cap" princely peerages in the Qing dynasty, which meant that the title could be passed down without being downgraded.

The first bearer of the title was Lekdehun (1619–1652), a great-grandson of Nurhaci, the founder of the Qing dynasty. In 1648, he was created "Prince Shuncheng of the Second Rank" by the Shunzhi Emperor. The emperor also granted "iron-cap" status to the peerage, which meant that the subsequent bearer of the title would be known as "Prince Shuncheng of the Second Rank" by default. In 1731, Xibao (1688–1742), the eighth Prince Shuncheng, was promoted from a junwang (second-rank prince) to qinwang (first-rank prince), hence he became known as "Prince Shuncheng of the First Rank". However, in 1733, Xibao was stripped of his title for committing an offence, and his title was then downgraded back to "Prince Shuncheng of the Second Rank" and passed on to his son, Xiliang (died 1744). The Prince Shuncheng peerage was passed down over 11 generations and held by 16 persons.

== Members of the Prince Shuncheng peerage ==
Members of the Prince Shuncheng peerage
- Lekdehun (勒克德渾; 1619 – 1652; 1st), Sahaliyan's second son and Daišan's grandson, held the title Prince Shuncheng of the Second Rank from 1648 to 1652, posthumously honoured as Prince Shuncheng Gonghui of the Second Rank (順承恭惠郡王)
  - 1 & 2 Haerha (哈爾哈) and Sala (薩喇)
  - 3 Nuoluobu (諾羅布; died 1717; 7th), held the title Prince Shuncheng of the Second Rank from 1715 to 1717, posthumously honoured as Prince Shuncheng Zhong of the Second Rank (順承忠郡王)
    - 1 to 3 Eerbu (額爾布), Huxiba (祜錫巴) and Jilantai (濟蘭太)
    - 4 Xibao (錫保; 1688 – 1742; 8th), held the title Prince Shuncheng of the Second Rank from 1717 to 1731, promoted to Prince Shuncheng of the First Rank in 1731, stripped of his title in 1733
      - 1 Xiliang (熙良; died 1744; 9th), held the title Prince Shuncheng of the Second Rank from 1733 to 1744, posthumously honoured as Prince Shuncheng Ke of the Second Rank (順承恪郡王)
        - 1 Taifeiying'a (泰斐英阿; died 1756; 10th), held the title Prince Shuncheng of the Second Rank from 1744 to 1756, posthumously honoured as Prince Shuncheng Gong of the Second Rank (順承恭郡王)
          - 1 Hengying (恆英), held the title of a Grace General. He was also an imperial guard officer.
          - 2 Hengling (恆齡), held the title of a Third Class Supporter General. He was also a palace director.
          - 3 Hengjing (恆景)
          - 4 Hengchang (恆昌; died 1778; 11th), held the title Prince Shuncheng of the Second Rank from 1756 to 1778, posthumously honoured as Prince Shuncheng Shen of the Second Rank (順承慎郡王)
            - 1 Lunzhu (倫柱; 1772 – 1823; 12th), held the title Prince Shuncheng of the Second Rank from 1786 to 1823, posthumously honoured as Prince Shuncheng Jian of the Second Rank (順承簡郡王)
              - 1 Chunshan (春山; 1800 – 1854; 13th), held the title Prince Shuncheng of the Second Rank from 1823 to 1854, posthumously honoured as Prince Shuncheng Qin of the Second Rank (順承勤郡王)
                - Qing'en (慶恩; 1844 – 1881; 14th), held the title Prince Shuncheng of the Second Rank from 1854 to 1881, posthumously honoured as Prince Shuncheng Min of the Second Rank (順承敏郡王)
                  - Nalehe (訥勒赫; 1881 – 1917; 15th), held the title Prince Shuncheng of the Second Rank from 1881 to 1917, posthumously honoured as Prince Shuncheng Zhi of the Second Rank (順承質郡王)
              - 2 Chunyou (春佑; 1801 – 1876), held the title of a Third Class Defender General
                - Qiande (謙德; 1834 – 1895), held the title of a Third Class Bulwark General
                  - Changfu (長福; 3 May 1872 - 31 Aug 1923), held the title of a Grace General. He was also a deputy director of the Industry Department and was a friend of Liang Qichao when he worked as consul at Kobe. He later died in Japan.
                    - 1 & 2 Wenzao (文藻) and Wenzhi (文芷)
                    - 3 Wenkui (文葵; 1911 – 1992; 16th), adopted as Nalehe's son, held the title Prince Shuncheng of the Second Rank from 1917 to 1945
                    - 4 Wenpeng (文蓬; 25 Dec 1922 - 12 May 2013)
                  - Xiangzheng (祥徵)
                  - Quanfu (銓福), held the title of a Grace General
            - 2 Luncheng (倫成), held the title of a First Class Bulwark General. He was also a second class imperial guard.
            - 3 Lunzheng (倫正), held the title of a Second Class Bulwark General.
          - 5 Hengqing (恆慶), held the title of a Supporter General. He was also a striker guard.
          - 6 Hengbo (恆博), held the title of a Third Class Supporter General, later stripped of his title.
        - 2 & 3 Zuncheng (尊承) and Dejiao (德交)
        - 4 Keming (克明), held the title of a Defender General
        - 5 Dezong (德宗), held the title of a Grace General. He was also an imperial guard.
        - 6 & 7 Deying (德英) and Tejing (特經)
      - 2 to 5 Qingde (慶德), Liushisan (六十三), Chaerdan (察爾丹) and Angjili (昂吉禮)
    - 5 & 6 Baofu (保福) and Baoshang (保尚)
    - 7 Fengnehe (封訥赫), held the title of a Grace General, later stripped of his title.
  - 4 Lergiyen (勒爾錦; died 1706; 2nd), Lekdehun's fourth son, held the title Prince Shuncheng of the Second Rank from 1652 to 1680, stripped of his title in 1680.
    - 1 & 2 Leshou (勒綬) and Suerfo (蘇爾佛)
    - 3 Lerbei (勒爾貝; died 1682; 3rd), held the title Prince Shuncheng of the Second Rank from 1681 to 1682
    - 4 Yanqi (延奇; died 1687; 4th), held the title Prince Shuncheng of the Second Rank from 1682 to 1687
    - 5 Mububa (穆布巴; 6th), held the title Prince Shuncheng of the Second Rank from 1698 to 1715, his title stripped in 1715
      - Jinbu (進布), Heshengtu (赫勝圖), Ban'e (伴鄂) and Zhulong'e (珠隆阿)
    - 6 Shuomubu (碩穆布)
    - 7 Chongbao (充保; died 1698; 5th), held the title Prince Shuncheng of the Second Rank from 1687 to 1698
    - 8 to 14 Xidabu (錫達布), Bintu (賓圖), Xintu (新圖), Baerdan (巴爾丹), Lintu (林圖), Kangkala (康喀喇) and Duoersai (多爾賽)

== Family tree ==
Lergiyen's line

Nurhaci
2	8
Daišan 代善; 1583 – 1684; Prince Li Lie of the First Rank 禮烈親王; 1636 - 1648	Hongtaiji
3	9
Sahaliyan 薩哈璘; 1604 – 1636; Prince Ying Yi of the First Rank 穎毅親王 (title posthumously)	Shunzhi Emperor
2
Lekdehun ^{1} 勒克德渾; 1619 – 1652; Prince Shuncheng Gonghui 順承恭惠郡王; 1648 – 1652
3	4
1. Ha'erha 哈爾哈; 2. Sala 薩喇	Nuoluobu ^{7} 諾羅布; 1650 - 1717; Prince Shuncheng Zhong 順承忠郡王; 1715 - 1717	Lergiyen ^{2} 勒爾錦; 1652 - 1706; Prince Shuncheng 順承郡王; 1652 – 1680 (title stripped)

Legend:
- - Title bearers
- - Emperors

Lergiyen's line

Lekdehun ^{1} 勒克德渾; 1619 – 1652; Prince Shuncheng Gonghui 順承恭惠郡王; 1648 – 1652
4
Lergiyen ^{2} 勒爾錦; 1652 - 1706; Prince Shuncheng 順承郡王; 1652 – 1680 (title stripped)
2	3	4	5
1. Leshou 勒綬; 2. Suerfo 蘇爾佛	Lerbei ^{3} 勒爾貝; 1678 - 1682; Prince Shuncheng 順承郡王; 1681 – 1682	Yanqi ^{4} 延奇; 1682 - 1687; Prince Shuncheng 順承郡王; 1682 – 1687	Mububa ^{6} 穆布巴; 1682 - 1751; Prince Shuncheng 順承郡王; 1698 – 1715	Chongbao ^{5} 充保; 1685 - 1698; Prince Shuncheng 順承郡王; 1687 – 1698	8. Xidabu 錫達布; 9. Bintu 賓圖; 10. Xintu 新圖; 11. Baerdan; 巴爾丹; 12. Lintu 林圖; 13. Kangkala 康喀喇; 14. Duoersai 多爾賽
1. Jinbu 進布; 2. Heshengtu; 赫勝圖; 3. Ban'e 伴鄂; 4. Zhulong'e 珠隆阿

Legend:
- - Title bearers
- - Emperors

Nuoluobu's line

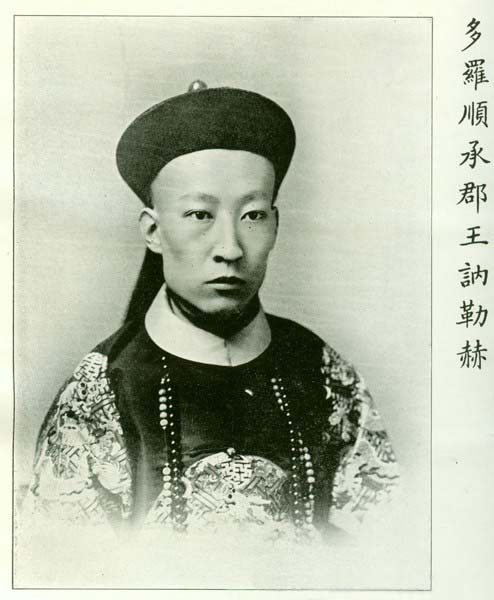
Lekdehun ^{1} 勒克德渾; 1619 – 1652; Prince Shuncheng Gonghui 順承恭惠郡王; 1648 – 1652
3
Nuoluobu ^{7} 諾羅布; 1650 - 1717; Prince Shuncheng Zhong 順承忠郡王; 1715 - 1717
4	7
1. Eerbu 額爾布; 2. Huxiba; 祜錫巴; 3. Jilantai 濟蘭太	Xibao ^{8} 錫保; 1688 – 1733; Prince Shuncheng (of the First Rank) 順承親王; 1731 – 1733	5. Baofu 保福; 6. Baoshang; 保尚	Fengnehe 封訥赫; Grace General 奉恩將軍
1
Xiliang ^{9} 熙良; 1705 - 1744; Prince Shuncheng Ke 順承恪郡王; 1733 – 1744	2. Qingde 慶德; 3. Liushisan; 六十三; 4. Chaerdan 察爾丹; 5. Angjili 昂吉禮
1	4	5
Taifeiying'a ^{10} 泰斐英阿; 1728 - 1756; Prince Shuncheng Gong 順承恭郡王; 1744 – 1756	2. Zuncheng 尊承; 3. Dejiao 德交	Keming 克明; Defender General 鎮國將軍	Dezong 德宗; Grace General 奉恩將軍	6. Deying 德英; 7. Tejing 特經
1	2	3	4	5	6
Hengying 恆英; Grace General 奉恩將軍	Hengling 恆齡; Third Class Supporter General 三等奉國將軍	Hengjing 恆景	Hengchang ^{11} 恆昌; 1753 - 1778; Prince Shuncheng Shen 順承慎郡王; 1756 – 1778	Hengqing 恆慶; Supporter General 奉國將軍	Hengbo 恆博; Third Class Supporter General 三等奉國將軍 (title stripped)
1	2	3
Lunzhu ^{12} 倫柱; 1772 – 1823; Prince Shuncheng Jian 順承簡郡王; 1786 – 1823	Luncheng 倫成; First Class Bulwark General 一等輔國將軍	Lunzheng 倫正; Second Class Bulwark General 二等輔國將軍
1	2
Chunshan ^{13} 春山; 1800 – 1854; Prince Shuncheng Qin 順承勤郡王; 1823 – 1854	Chunyou 春佑; 1801 – 1876; Third Class Defender General 三等鎮國將軍
Qing'en ^{14} 慶恩; 1844 - 1881; Prince Shuncheng Min 順承敏郡王; 1854 – 1881	Qiande 謙德; 1834 – 1895; Third Class Bulwark General 三等輔國將軍
Nalehe ^{15} 訥勒赫 1881 – 1917; Prince Shuncheng Zhi 順承質郡王; 1881 – 1917	Changfu 長福; 1872 - 1923; Grace General 奉恩將軍
3	4
1. Wenzao 文藻; 2. Wenzhi 文芷	Wenkui ^{16} 文葵; 1911 – 1992; Prince Shuncheng 順承郡王; 1917 – 1945	Wenpeng 文蓬; 1922 - 2013

Legend:
- - Title bearers
- - Emperors

adoption

== See also ==
- Imperial and noble ranks of the Qing dynasty
