= Nelehe =

Imperial prince of the Qing dynasty

- Prince Shuncheng of the Second Rank
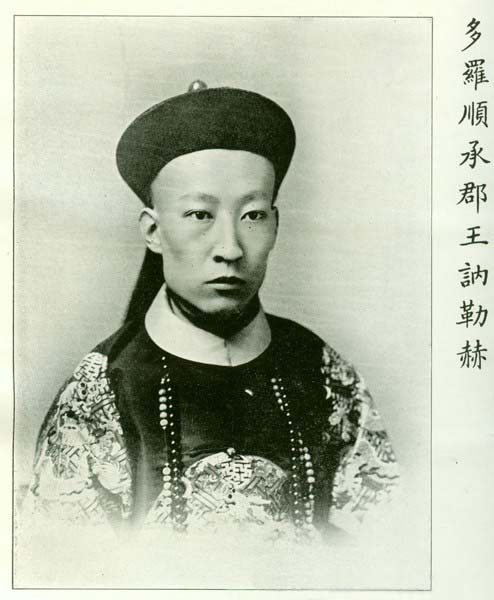

Prince Shuncheng of the Second Rank
- Tenure: 1881–1917
- Predecessor: Qing'en
- Successor: Wenkui
- Born: 4 July 1881
- Died: 14 February 1917 (aged 35)
- Spouse: Yehenara Jingfang
Posthumous name
- Prince Shuncheng Zhi of the Second Rank (順承質郡王)
- Father: Prince Shunchengmin Qing'en
- Mother: Lady Yanggiya

Nelehe (Chinese: 訥勒赫; pinyin: Nèlèhè; 4 July 1881 – 14 February 1917) was a Qing dynasty imperial prince. He was a 16th-generation descendant of Lekdehun, Daišan's grandson and Nurhaci's great-grandson.

== Life ==
Nelehe was born on 4 July 1881, which translates to 8th day of the 5th lunar month of the seventh year of Guangxu era. In August of the same year, Nelehe inherited a title of Prince Shuncheng of the Second Rank after the death of his father, Qing'en (庆恩). In 1898, Nelehe was appointed as a commander of Bordered Red Banner army. In three years, he was tasked with supervising the Plain White Banner Gioro Family School, exclusively reserved for imperial princes; children of collateral Gioro clansmen and their close relatives. In 1905, he became a commander of Mongol Bordered Yellow Banner army. In 1906, he was transferred back to the Manchu Bordered Red Banner and was made a Right Vice Director of the Imperial Clan Court after the graduation at Lu Jungui's School. In 1911, he was retransferred to the Manchu Plain White Banner. Nelehe died on 14 February 1917, 6 years after the demise of last Chinese dynasty. He was posthumously honoured as Prince Shuncheng Zhi of the Second Rank (順承質郡王/顺承质郡王, meaning "obedient and knowledgeable")

Nelehe was married to Yehenara Jingfang, the youngest daughter of Guixiang (桂祥), a brother of Empress Dowager Cixi. The marriage wasn't consumed due to childlessness. According to the law, if the prince was childless, he would adopt a child from the same cadet line. Nelehe adopted a son of grace general Changfu, his second cousin. The peerage was abolished in 1945.

== Family ==
Father: Qing'en, Prince Shunchengmin of the Second Rank (顺承敏郡王 庆恩)

Mother: Mistress, Lady Yanggiya (庶福晋 杨佳氏)

Consorts:

- Yehenara Jingfang, a primary consort (嫡福晋，叶赫那拉·静芳)

Issue:

- Adopted son: Wenkui (文葵), biological son of grace general Changfu (长福) by primary consort, Lady Bolot (继夫人 博罗特氏)
