= Wanzhen =

Yehe Nara Wanzhen
- Princess Consort Chunxian of the First Rank
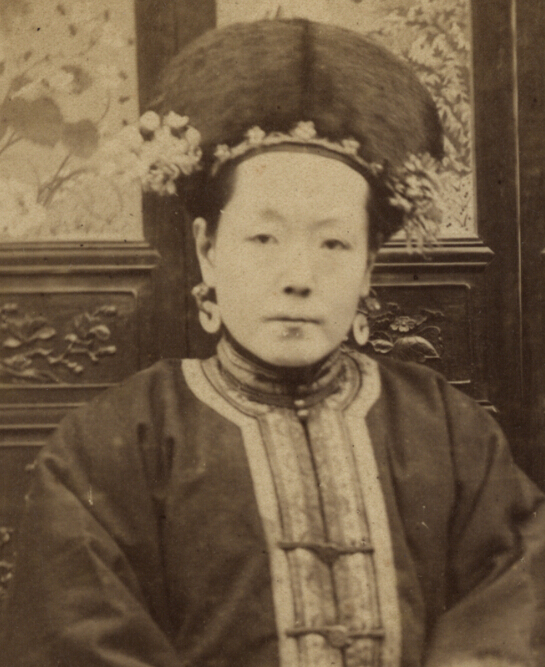
- Wanzhen c. 1870s–80s
- Born: Yehe Nara Wanzhen (葉赫那拉·婉貞); 13 September 1841 (道光二十一年 七月 二十八日); Beijing
- Died: 17 June 1896 (aged 54) (光緒二十二年 五月 七日); Prince Chun Mansion
- Spouse: Yixuan, Prince Chunxian of the First Rank (m. 1860; died 1891)
- Issue: Zaihan; Guangxu Emperor; Third son Zaiguang
Names
- Yehe Nara Wanzhen (葉赫那拉·婉貞)
- House: Yehe Nara (葉赫那拉; by birth); Aisin Gioro (by marriage)
- Father: Huizheng
- Mother: Lady Fuca

Wanzhen (13 September 1841 – 17 June 1896), of the Manchu Bordered Yellow Banner Yehe Nara clan, was a consort of Yixuan. She was one year his junior and the younger sister of Empress Cixi and the mother of Emperor Guangxu.

== Life ==
=== Family background ===
- Father: Huizheng (惠徵; 1805–1853), held the title of a third class duke (三等公)
  - Paternal grandfather: Jingrui (景瑞)
  - Paternal grandmother: Lady Gūwalgiya
- Mother: Lady Fuca
  - Maternal grandfather: Huixian (惠顯)
- Three brothers
  - Second younger brother: Guixiang (桂祥; 1849–1913), served as first rank military official (都統), and held the title of a third class duke (三等公), the father of Empress Xiaodingjing (1868–1913)
- One elder sister
  - First elder sister: Xingzhen (杏贞) (1835–1908), the mother of the Tongzhi Emperor (1856–1875)

=== Daoguang era ===
The future primary consort was born on the 28th day of the seventh lunar month in the 21st year of the reign of the Daoguang Emperor, which translates to 13 September 1841 in the Gregorian calendar.

=== Xianfeng era ===
On 26 June 1852, Lady Yehe Nara's elder sister, the future Empress Dowager Cixi, entered the Forbidden City and became a consort of the Xianfeng Emperor. By 1857, this lady was styled "Noble Consort Yi". Wishing to strengthen familial ties within the ruling Aisin Gioro clan by having an imperial prince as her brother-in-law, Noble Consort Yi recommended her younger sister as a spouse for Yixuan, the Xianfeng Emperor's younger half-brother. The marriage took place in 1860.

=== Tongzhi era ===
Following the Xianfeng Emperor's death on 22 August 1861, Noble Consort Yi's son, Zaichun, was enthroned as the Tongzhi Emperor, with his mother and stepmother, Empress Dowager Ci'an, serving as his regents.

Lady Yehe Nara gave birth on 4 February 1865 to Yixuan's first son, Zaihan, who would die prematurely on 9 December 1866, and on 14 August 1871 to his second son, Zaitian.

=== Guangxu era ===
Following the Tongzhi Emperor's death on 12 January 1875, Zaitian was chosen by the two empress dowagers to be the Tongzhi Emperor's successor and was enthroned as the Guangxu Emperor.

Lady Yehe Nara gave birth on 13 February 1875 to Yixuan's third son, who would die prematurely on 14 February 1875, and on 27 November 1880 to his fourth son, Zaiguang, who would die prematurely on 18 May 1884.

Lady Yehe Nara was widowed on 1 January 1891. Yixuan's fifth son, Zaifeng, inherited his father's peerage. Lady Yehe Nara died on 17 June 1896.

In his memoirs, Puyi, the Last Emperor and Zaifeng's son, described Lady Yehe Nara as a fairly abusive woman, who terrorised her servants, children and stepchildren alike, and noted that at least one of her sons died of malnutrition. Empress Dowager Cixi also recalled that when the Guangxu Emperor was brought to the Forbidden City for his coronation, "he was a very sickly child, and could hardly walk, he was so thin and weak. His parents seemed to be afraid of giving him anything to eat."

== Titles ==
- During the reign of the Daoguang Emperor (r. 1820–1850):
  - Lady Yehe Nara (from 13 September 1841)
- During the reign of the Xianfeng Emperor (r. 1850–1861):
  - Primary consort (嫡福晉; from 1860)

== Issue ==
- As primary consort:
  - Zaihan (載瀚; 4 February 1865 – 9 December 1866), Yixuan's first son
  - Zaitian (載湉; 14 August 1871 – 14 November 1908), Yixuan's second son, enthroned on 25 February 1875 as the Guangxu Emperor
  - Yixuan's third son (13 February 1875 – 14 February 1875)
  - Zaiguang (載洸; 27 November 1880 – 18 May 1884), Yixuan's fourth son
  - Daughter (died early)

== See also ==
- Yehe Nara clan
