= Guangxu Emperor =

Emperor of China from 1875 to 1908

Guangxu Emperor 光緒帝
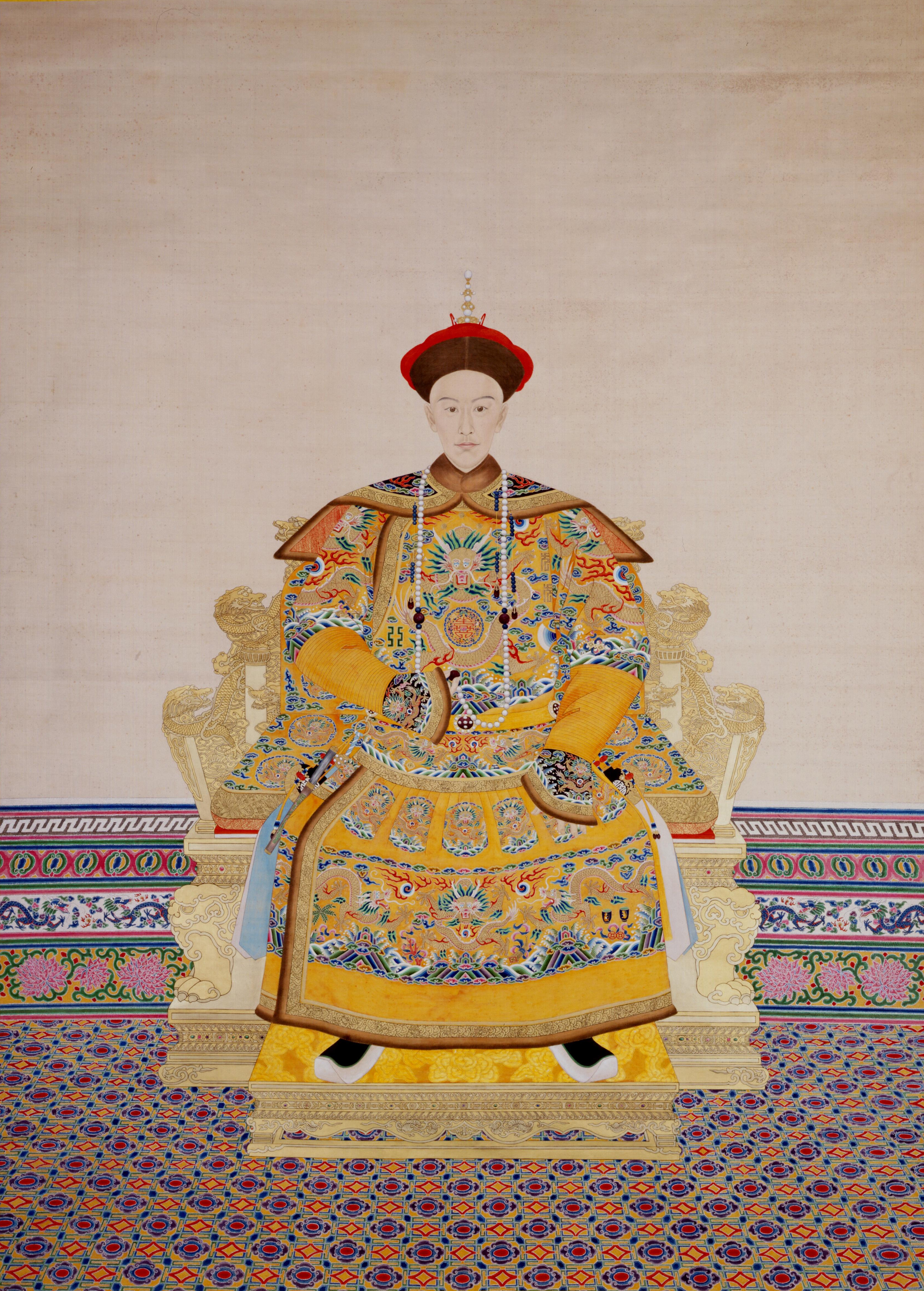
- 19th century state portrait, by anonymous painter, currently in the collection of the Palace Museum

Emperor of the Qing dynasty
- Reign: 25 February 1875 – 14 November 1908
- Predecessor: Tongzhi Emperor
- Successor: Xuantong Emperor
- Regents: Empress Dowager Ci'an (1875–1881); Empress Dowager Cixi (1875–1889; 1898–1908)
- Born: 14 August 1871; Prince Chun's Mansion (in present-day Beijing)
- Died: 14 November 1908 (aged 37); Hanyuan Temple, Yingtai Island, Zhongnan Lake (in present-day Beijing)
- Burial: Chong Mausoleum, Western Qing tombs
- Consort: Empress Xiaodingjing (m. 1889)
Names
- Zaitian (載湉); Manchu: Dzai tiyan (ᡯᠠᡳ ᡨᡳᠶᠠᠨ)
Era dates
- Guangxu (光緒): 6 February 1875 – 21 January 1909; Manchu: Badarangga doro (ᠪᠠᡩᠠᡵᠠᠩᡤᠠ ᡩᠣᡵᠣ); Mongolian: Бадаргуулт төр (ᠪᠠᠳᠠᠷᠠᠭᠤᠯᠲᠤ ᠲᠥᠷᠥ)
Posthumous name
- Emperor Tongtian Chongyun Dazhong Zhizheng Jingwen Weiwu Renxiao Ruizhi Duanjian Kuanqin Jing (同天崇運大中至正經文緯武仁孝睿智端儉寬勤景皇帝); Manchu: Ambalinggū hūwangdi (ᠠᠮᠪᠠᠯᡳᠩᡤᡡ ᡥᡡᠸᠠᠩᡩᡳ)
Temple name
- Dezong (德宗); Manchu: Dedzung (ᡩᡝᡯᡠᠩ)
- House: Aisin-Gioro
- Dynasty: Qing
- Father: Yixuan, Prince Chunxian of the First Rank
- Mother: Wanzhen

Chinese name
- Traditional Chinese: 光緒帝
- Simplified Chinese: 光绪帝
Transcriptions
Standard Mandarin
- Hanyu Pinyin: Guāngxù Dì
- Wade–Giles: Kuang^{1}-hsu^{4} Ti^{4}
- IPA: [kwáŋɕŷ tî]

The Guangxu Emperor (14 August 1871 – 14 November 1908), also known by his temple name Emperor Dezong of Qing, personal name Zaitian, was the tenth and penultimate emperor of the Qing dynasty, and the ninth Qing emperor to rule over China proper. His succession was endorsed by dowager empresses Ci'an and Cixi for political reasons, after the Tongzhi Emperor died without an heir. Cixi held political power for much of Guangxu's reign as regent, except for the period between his assumption of ruling powers in 1889 and the Hundred Days' Reform in 1898.

The Qing Empire's prestige and sovereignty continued to erode during Guangxu's reign with defeats in the Sino-French War, the First Sino-Japanese War, and the Boxer Rebellion. Guangxu engaged intellectuals like Kang Youwei and Liang Qichao to develop the Hundred Days' Reform program of 1898 to reverse the decline. Among the goals was removing Cixi from power; however, the program was too radical for the conservative ruling elite, and it failed to secure the support of the army. Cixi rallied the program's opponents to launch a coup in late 1898 that suppressed the reforms and secured her power. Guangxu lost ruling powers and was placed under virtual house arrest at the Yingtai Pavilion of Zhongnanhai until his death.

Guangxu died without children in 1908 of arsenic poisoning. He was buried in the Chongling at the Western Qing tombs.

== Accession to the throne and upbringing ==
The Guangxu Emperor was born on 14 August 1871, receiving the name Zaitian; he was the second son of Yixuan (Prince Chun), whose primary spouse was Yehenara Wanzhen, a younger sister of Empress Dowager Cixi. He was the nephew of Cixi and the grandson of the Daoguang Emperor.

On 12 January 1875, Zaitian's cousin, the Tongzhi Emperor, died without a son to succeed him. On that same day, an imperial conference was held by the co-regents of the former emperor, the Empress Dowager Ci'an and the Empress Dowager Cixi. Breaking the imperial convention that a new emperor must always be of a generation after that of the previous emperor, candidates were considered from the generation of Tongzhi. The reason for this was that the empress dowagers wanted the candidate to take the place of the Tongzhi Emperor as the successor to the Xianfeng Emperor, whose only son had been Tongzhi.

The other proposed candidates besides Zaitian were the two sons of Prince Gong, Zaicheng and Zaiying, but they were of the same age group as the Tongzhi Emperor and were seen as having been a negative influence on him, so they were distrusted. Zaitian was younger than both of them and was the nephew of Cixi. His father, Prince Chun, was also more liked than Prince Gong and was known for being a scholar and a supporter of patriotic policies. These were the factors that led to the selection of Zaitian to become emperor.

A decree announced on 13 January that Zaitian had been chosen as the successor to the Xianfeng Emperor. The same decree also announced that Empress Dowagers Ci'an and Cixi would be his co-regents. He ascended to the throne at the age of three, on 25 February 1875, and adopted "Guangxu" (meaning "continuation of splendor") as his regnal name; therefore, he is known as the "Guangxu Emperor". His personal name Zaitian was no longer used after that point.

Beginning in March 1876, the Guangxu Emperor was taught by Weng Tonghe—who had also been involved in the disastrous upbringing of the Tongzhi Emperor, yet managed to be exonerated of all possible charges—and his education was also overseen by his father, Prince Chun. The emperor was taught calligraphy, the Chinese classics (including the Four Books), and the Chinese, Mongolian, and Manchu languages.

Starting in 1881, he began reading historical works, including the decrees of earlier emperors. Guangxu could work diligently and already knew some of the classics, but he was not always interested in his daily lessons. As part of the emperor's education, he was taught that his main obligation as ruler was "keeping the state in order" and "maintaining universal peace", as stated in the Confucian classic Great Learning.

The Guangxu Emperor seemed to become a self-disciplinarian early on. In 1876, he told Weng Tonghe that he considered frugality to be more important than the accumulation of wealth, and in another instance in 1878, he insisted on walking through snow and told his servants not to clear it out of his way. He also said that he considered the Tao to be more important than his own views. But, Weng noted that the emperor sometimes had extreme mood swings and did not want to participate in their daily lessons.

Weng also instilled in the Guangxu Emperor a duty of filial piety toward the Empress Dowagers Cixi and Ci'an, which, aside from being a Chinese tradition, was also because Weng owed much of his successful career to the patronage of Cixi. In 1881, when the Guangxu Emperor was nine, Empress Dowager Ci'an died unexpectedly, leaving Empress Dowager Cixi as sole regent for the boy. In Weng's diaries during those days, Guangxu was reportedly seen with swollen eyes, had poor concentration and was seeking consolation from Weng. Weng also expressed his concern that Cixi was the one who had been suffering from chronic ill-health, not Ci'an. During this time, the imperial eunuchs often abused their influence over the boy emperor. The Guangxu Emperor had also reportedly begun to hold some audiences on his own as an act of necessity in the early 1880s, though this stopped in 1883 when Cixi recovered from her illness.

== Assuming power ==
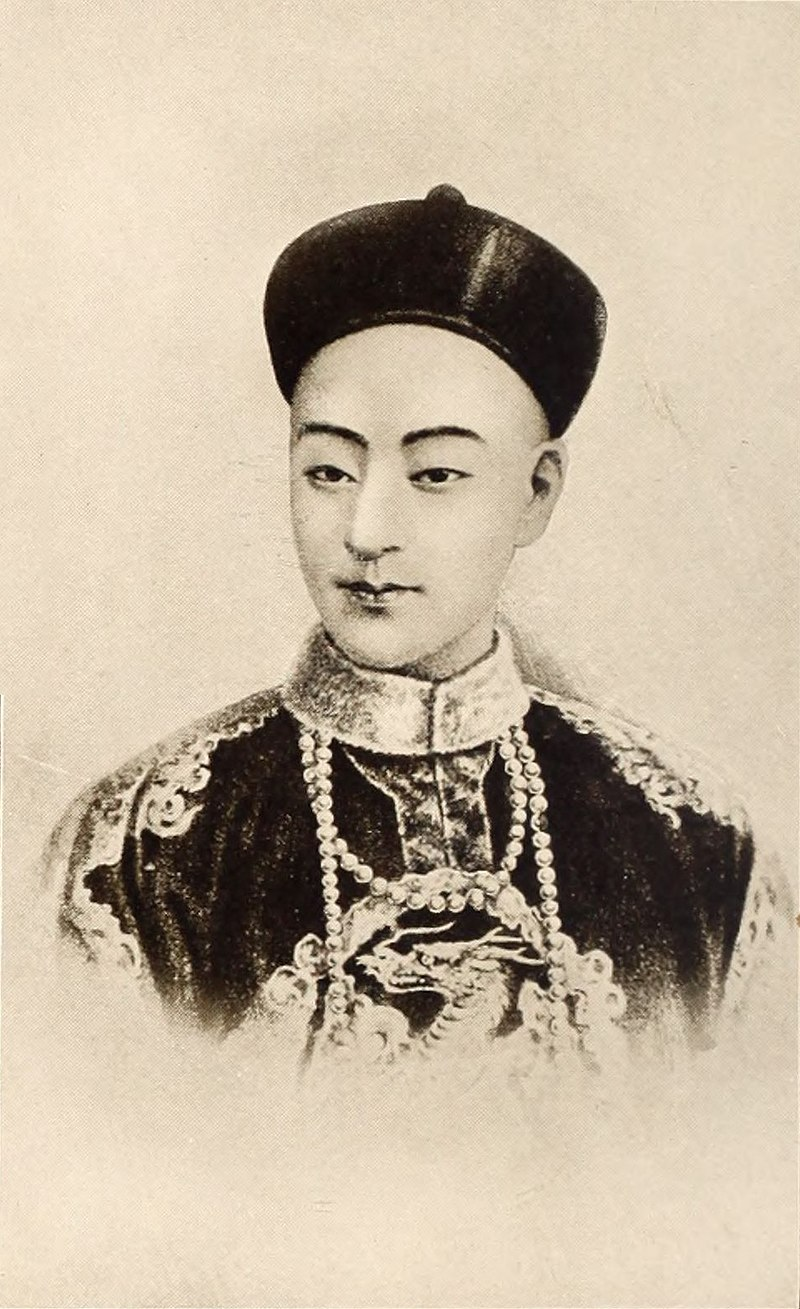
Guangxu in Imperial clothing

The Guangxu Emperor's reign saw the outbreak of the Sino-French War in 1884 over influence in Vietnam. By the time the war ended in 1885, the French had destroyed the Chinese fleet at Fuzhou, patrolled the coast of southern China unobstructed, occupied part of Taiwan, and ended the status of Vietnam as a tributary of China. This prompted Britain to end the tributary status of Burma in 1886, which China did not oppose militarily, and encouraged Japan to do the same in Korea.

The negotiations with the French were carried out by the Viceroy of Zhili, Li Hongzhang, by other ministers in Beijing, and by the head of Chinese Maritime Customs, Robert Hart. The Guangxu Emperor had not given an audience to foreign diplomats in Beijing up to this point; though in August 1886, his father Prince Chun hosted a dinner for the diplomatic corps. On 7 February 1887, the emperor was officially old enough to begin to rule in his own right, but the regency of Empress Dowager Cixi continued beyond that, and the foreign diplomats were not informed of either fact. The French minister requested an audience with the emperor twice, in November 1887 and in the spring of 1888, but was denied both times.

In 1886, several courtiers, including Prince Chun and Weng Tonghe, had petitioned Empress Dowager Cixi to postpone her retirement from the regency. Despite Cixi's agreement to remain as regent, that same year the Guangxu Emperor had begun to write comments on memorials to the throne. In the spring of 1887, he partook in his first field-plowing ceremony, and by the end of the year he had begun to rule under Cixi's supervision. By the mid-1880s the Guangxu Emperor also developed the ideas that he wanted guide his rule, including preserving the wealth of the country and avoiding selfishness or arrogance. Among his predecessors, he considered the Qianlong Emperor to be a model of good governance, and often visited places where the Qianlong Emperor had spent a lot of time. He felt a sense of responsibility for following the example set by the Qianlong Emperor. Meanwhile, Prince Chun and the Grand Council prepared for the Guangxu Emperor to begin ruling directly by taking measures to ensure that the system that existed during the regency effectively remained intact.

Eventually, in February 1889, in preparation for Cixi's retirement, the Guangxu Emperor was married. Much to the emperor's dislike, Cixi selected her niece, Jingfen, to be empress. She became known as Empress Longyu. She also selected a pair of sisters, who became Consorts Jin and Zhen, to be the emperor's concubines.

The following week, with the Guangxu Emperor married, Cixi retired from the regency on 4 March 1889.

== Years in power ==
=== Early rule ===
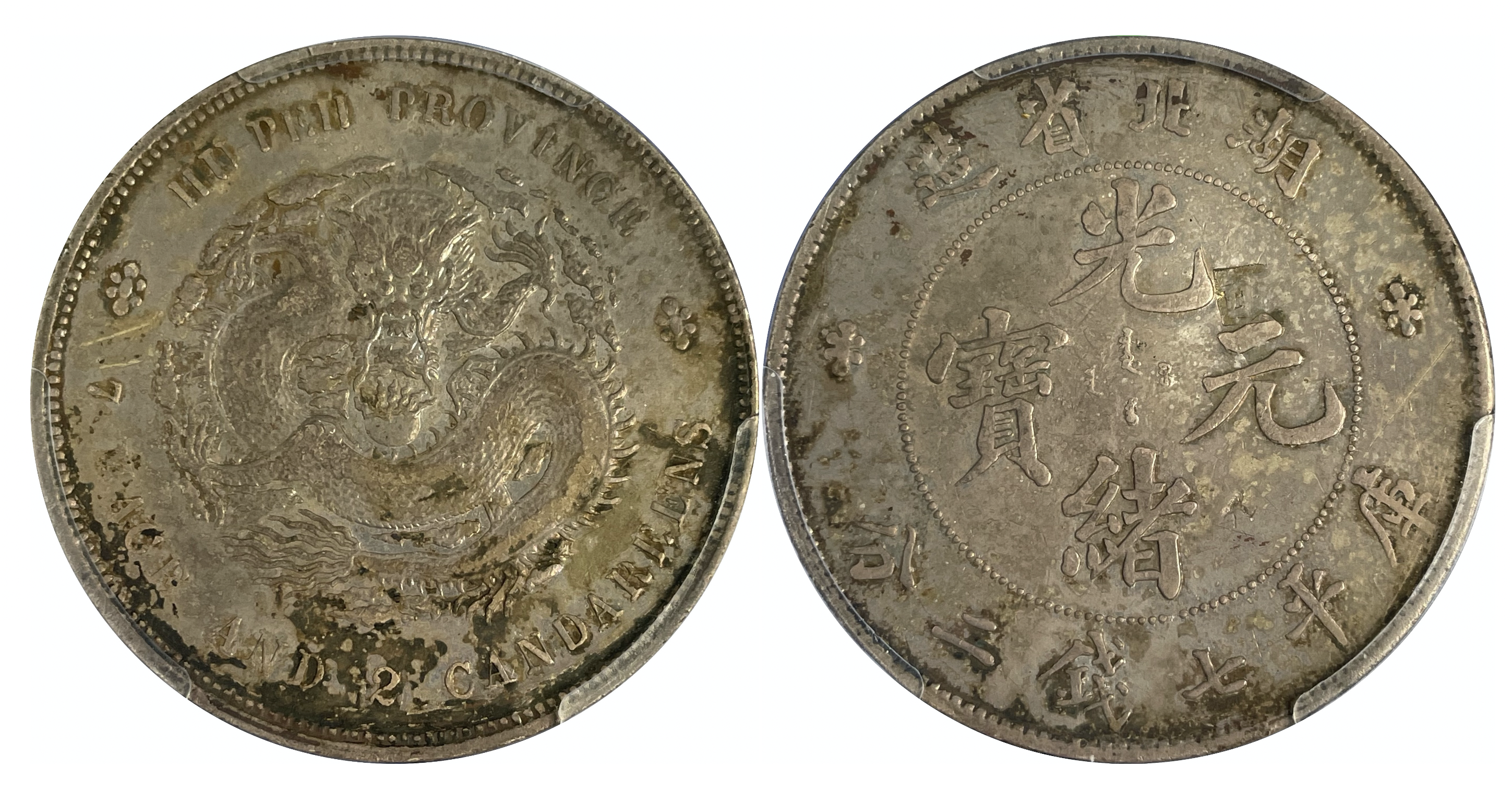
Silver coin: 1 yuan Guangxu (光绪元宝), Hupei Province (1895–1907)

Even after the Guangxu Emperor began formal rule, he found that the power structure of the Qing court still depended on Empress Dowager Cixi, and he did not know how far his own authority extended. The emperor tried to take a leading role in the government, especially after the empress dowager began spending several months of the year at the Summer Palace starting from 1891, but he never became capable of skillfully managing imperial court politics. The decisions he made and the administrative process continued to be overseen by the empress dowager. Weng Tonghe reportedly observed that, while the emperor attended to day-to-day state affairs, in more difficult cases the emperor and the Grand Council sought Cixi's advice. She also decided on appointments to the Grand Council and the Six Ministries.

In December 1890, the emperor issued a decree stating that he wanted to have an immediate audience with the foreign diplomatic corps in Beijing and to make this an annual occurrence going forward. They presented a list of conditions for the protocol at the ceremony, and it was accepted by the Qing. The audience took place on 5 March 1891, with the Guangxu Emperor receiving the foreign ministers to China at an audience in the "Pavilion of Purple Light", in what is now part of Zhongnanhai, something that had also been done by the Tongzhi Emperor in 1873.

That summer, under pressure from the foreign legations and in response to revolts in the Yangtze River valley that were targeting Christian missionaries, the emperor issued an edict ordering Christians to be placed under state protection. The audience of foreign diplomats with the Gaungxu Emperor became more frequent after that. He received the new Austro-Hungarian minister in a special audience in October 1891, the British minister in December 1892, and the German and Belgian ministers in 1893.

The Guangxu Emperor followed his principle of frugality in early 1892, when he tried to implement a series of draconian measures to reduce expenditures by the Imperial Household Department, which proved to be one of his few administrative successes; however, the dispute over the budget continued until early 1894. Its other effects were humiliating and alienating senior Manchu officials in the bureaucracy, who remained in contact with Cixi, and reducing his potential allies at the imperial court.

The Guangxu Emperor inherited the system of the Qing dynasty that had emerged in 1861, at the start of the Tongzhi Emperor's reign. The source of authority were the two empresses dowager, while the young emperor had a secondary role, and the princes and ministers were responsible for actually running the machinery of the government. When Empress Dowager Cixi retired, Guangxu had control over the administration of the empire and she did not interfere with his actions, but the princes and ministers advised him to bring back the old system in 1894, at the start of the tensions with Japan.

=== Foreign crises ===
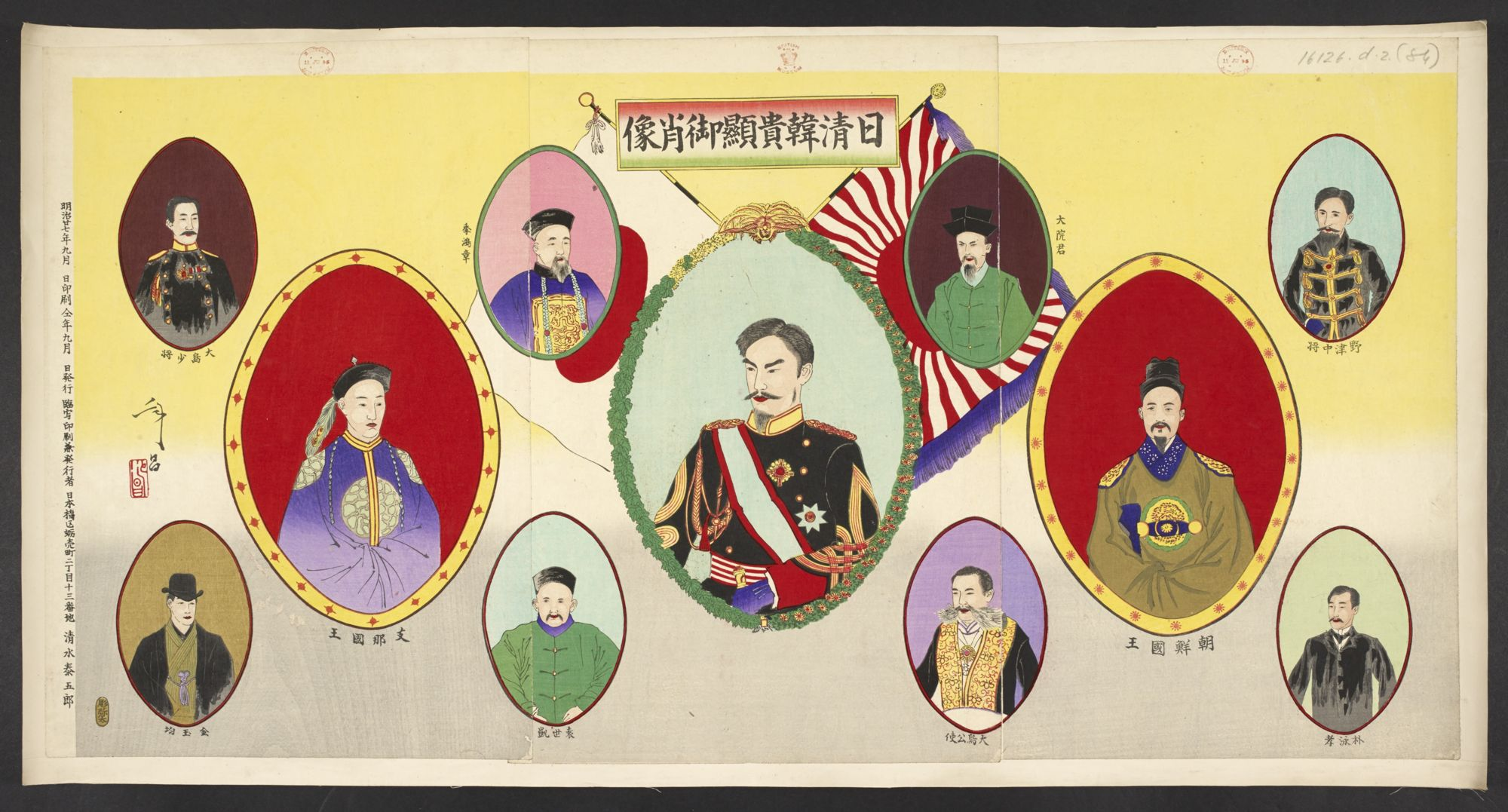
A Japanese print showing key leaders during the war, including Emperor Guangxu (left of center)

The summer of 1894 saw the outbreak of the First Sino-Japanese War over influence in Korea. The Guangxu Emperor was reportedly eager for the war against Japan and became associated with the pro-war faction in the imperial court, which believed that China would easily win. This was in contrast to the Empress Dowager Cixi and Viceroy Li Hongzhang, who both wanted to reach a peaceful resolution. The conflict was also an opportunity for the emperor to make his own decisions instead of remaining influenced by the empress dowager.

After the Japanese attacked and sank a Chinese warship on 25 July without any declaration of war, the ministers of the Qing emperor advised him to declare war on Japan. In that document, made on 1 August, the Guangxu Emperor accused Japan of sending armies to force the king of Korea to change his system of government and of violating international law. He also used the term "dwarfs" for the Japanese, an ancient Chinese derogatory term, reflecting the widespread contemptuous view of Japan that many Qing officials had.

China suffered major defeats within two days in September 1894 at the Battle of Pyongyang and the Battle of the Yalu River, largely destroying the Huai Army and the Beiyang Fleet, the Qing dynasty's best military forces. The Guangxu Emperor was angry and wanted to go to the front at once to personally take command of the troops, but he was talked out of it by his advisors. The emperor met with a German military advisor who had been present at the Battle of the Yalu, Constantin von Hanneken, to learn what exactly happened, suggesting that he may not have trusted his ministers to tell him the truth. He also signed edicts calling for the execution of generals who were defeated.

During the war, even though the Guangxu Emperor was nominally the sovereign ruler of the Qing Empire, officials often ignored him and instead sent their memorials to Cixi for her approval. Eventually, two sets of Grand Council memoranda were created, one for the emperor and the other for the empress dowager, a practice that continued until it was rendered unnecessary by the events in the autumn of 1898.

In February 1895, as peace negotiations with the Japanese were underway, the Guangxu Emperor spoke with his top negotiator, Li Hongzhang, before he met with the Japanese, and allegedly told him during their conversation that China needed large scale reforms. In April, after the Treaty of Shimonoseki was signed but before it was ratified by the Qing government, the treaty's severe terms for China were publicized. Government bureaucrats throughout the empire urged the imperial court to reject it and continue fighting. The emperor did not want to take responsibility for ratifying the treaty, and neither did the Empress Dowager Cixi, who may have wanted to use the defeat against Japan to undermine Guangxu. He tried to shift the responsibility in an edict by asking two officials, Liu Kunyi and Wang Wenshao, to give their opinion on whether to accept the treaty, because they had told him that the Chinese military was capable of achieving victory. Eventually the Guangxu Emperor ratified it.

The emperor and the Qing government faced further humiliation in late 1897 when the German Empire used the murders of two priests in the province of Shandong as an excuse to occupy Jiaozhou Bay (including Qingdao), prompting a "scramble for concessions" by other foreign powers. Germany sent a naval squadron under command of the brother of Emperor Wilhelm II, the admiral Prince Heinrich, who was later received by the Qing monarch at the Summer Palace in May 1898. Germany's example was followed by demands from Russia, Britain, France, and Japan. China's relatively weak forces were not in a position to challenge them, and the United States, which was opposed to European concessions, was distracted by events in Cuba and the Spanish–American War. In the six months between November 1897 and May 1898, China had received unprecedented demands from foreign powers.

After the Qing Empire's defeat to Japan and forced agreement to the terms of the Treaty of Shimonoseki, the Guangxu Emperor reportedly expressed his wish to abdicate. He wrote that by giving away Taiwan to Japan, as the treaty required, he was going to lose the "unity of the people". The emperor felt that he was unworthy of his ancestors because he failed as a leader, which was made worse after he was also forced to give concessions to the European powers in 1897–98. Luke Kwong wrote that this was part of what drove the Guangxu Emperor to begin the Hundred Days' Reform in the summer of 1898, because he saw taking radical action to revitalize the Qing dynasty as the only way to make up for his perceived failure.

Already, in December 1897, the emperor wrote an edict that asked bureaucrats with military knowledge to recommend reforms that could be made. Between 1895 and 1898, he had multiple private meetings with Yuan Shikai, which was uncommon for an official of his rank. Yuan presented the emperor with a plan to create a Western-style army for the Qing in August 1895, and was appointed by him that December to establish and lead a unit that would become the basis for the future Beiyang Army. The Guangxu Emperor was impressed with Yuan, who had been recommended to the monarch by many other senior officials.

=== Hundred Days' Reform ===
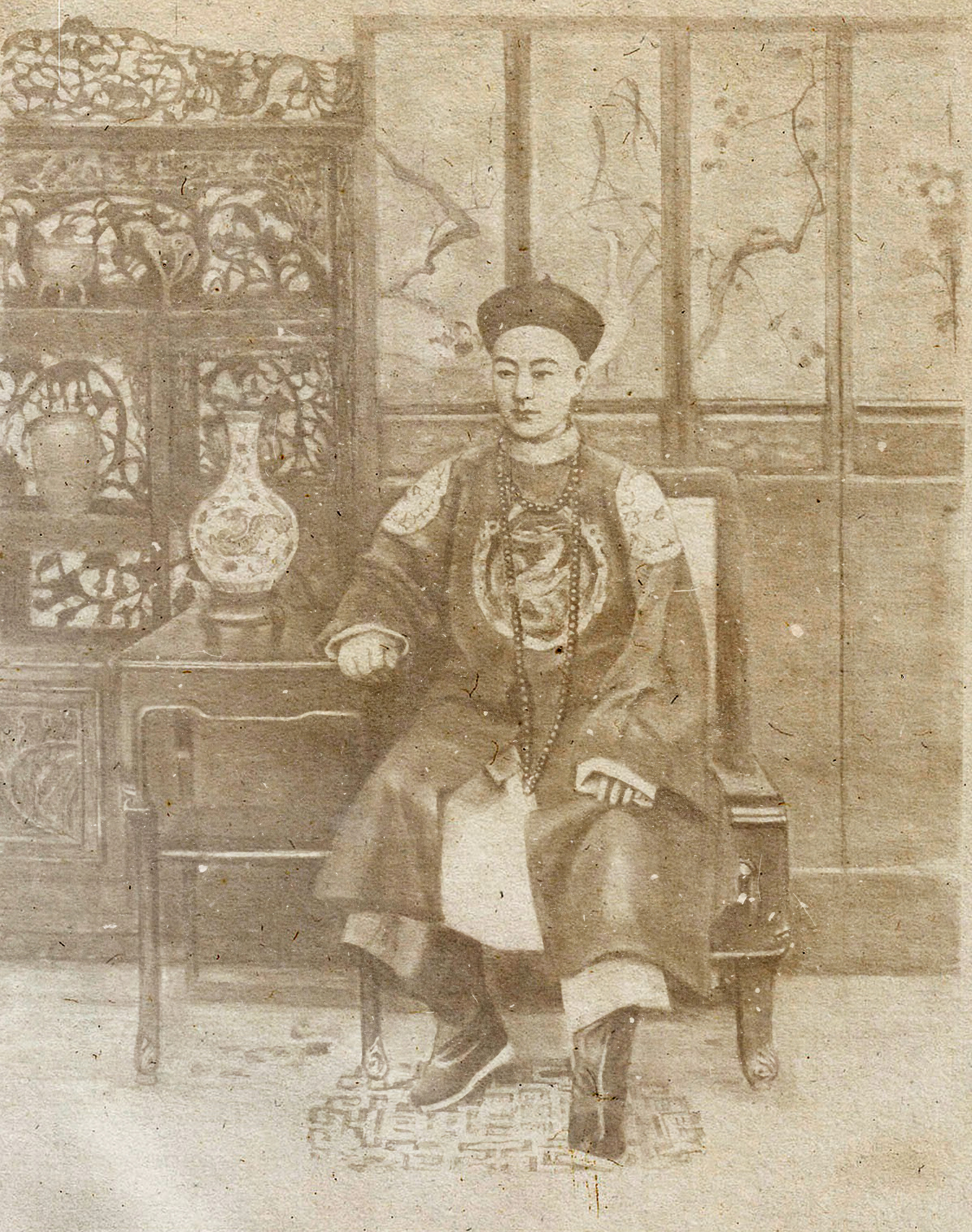
Portrait of Emperor Guangxu

Following the war and the scramble for concessions, there was growing support for reform in China among the gentry and the nobility in the spring of 1898. In April, the emperor was presented with a memorial to the throne signed by young metropolitan officials and jinshi graduates that urged him to not trust his ministers and deal with the foreign powers on his own. In early June 1898, the grand councilor Weng Tonghe introduced the Guangxu Emperor to the reformist official Kang Youwei, and the emperor was impressed by him, especially after reading Kang's two books about the reforms in Russia by Peter the Great and in Japan by the Meiji Emperor.

The emperor personally met with Kang on 14 June, and started issuing reform decrees on 11 June. The first order, the edict of 11 June 1898, declared the intent of the Qing emperor to pursue reform as a response to calls from certain officials since the war with Japan: it asked every one of his subjects to contribute to strengthening China, a project that was going to be based on "Western learning" while maintaining respect for traditional morals. Guangxu also received Cixi's approval for the edict.

Between June and September 1898, the emperor carried out the Hundred Days' Reform, aimed at a series of sweeping political, legal and social changes. The goal was to make China a modern constitutional empire, but still within the traditional framework, as with Japan's Meiji Restoration. The emperor's initial focus was establishing the Imperial University in Beijing and reforming the education system. The last part of his edict of 11 June instructed the Grand Council and the Zongli Yamen, the Qing dynasty's foreign office, to establish the Imperial University right away.

The Guangxu Emperor then issued edicts for a massive number of far-reaching modernizing reforms with the help of more progressive officials such as Kang Youwei and Liang Qichao. Changes ranged from infrastructure to industry and the civil examination system. Other edicts were for the construction of the Lu-Han railway, a system of budgets similar to that of Western governments, the replacement of the Green Standard Army with a Western-style national army based on conscription, and the creation of a naval academy. Among the lesser known measures that the Guangxu Emperor wanted to take was his naval armament program, which called for China to have a navy of 21 battleships. The emperor also required court bureaucrats to read the writings of the earlier reformist official Feng Guifen and present a report on his suggestions in ten days, encouraged imperial princes to study abroad, and tried to streamline the government by firing 5,000 state employees.

One of the early stumbling blocks for this effort happened on 15 June, when the Guangxu Emperor suddenly dismissed the grand councilor Weng Tonghe from all of his posts, even though he had been the one to draft his first reform edict. It has been debated by historians what the immediate reason for the action was, but it occurred after Weng had been a voice of caution leading up the summer of 1898, and he may have been seen by the emperor as an obstacle to his plans. The emperor was also impatient and wanted immediate results, so he may have fired him in an emotional moment. On several occasions, he also tried to write his edicts in a way that would intimidate other officials, which undermined his own call for unity on the project. Overall, there was no coherent structure to the Hundred Days' Reform, and the Guangxu Emperor was frantically trying to begin as many changes as he could with his edicts, causing the bureaucracy to be overwhelmed by the large number of edicts being written.

Although the decrees between June and August were largely accepted and were creating the basis for reform, starting in September they began targeting the positions of the Manchu nobility and the gentry. These were not only too sudden for a China still under significant neo-Confucian influence and other elements of traditional culture, but later came into conflict with Cixi, who held real power. Many officials, deemed useless and dismissed by the Guangxu Emperor, begged her for help.

However, the decisive response by Empress Dowager Cixi was caused by the accusation from the official Yang Chongyi that the Guangxu Emperor had committed treason by inviting the former Japanese prime minister Itō Hirobumi to advise him (Itō was in China at the time to meet with the emperor). Yang claimed that Guangxu had done this on the advice of Kang Youwei and the wanted revolutionary Sun Yat-sen. Guangxu was unable to effectively defend himself to Cixi from Yang's accusation. Both sides began plotting to take action against each other.

Some of the reformers around the emperor asked Yuan Shikai to use the Beiyang Army to arrest Cixi and to execute Ronglu, a member of the conservative faction who had been appointed to command the military forces in Zhili earlier. According to one account, this was a decree that was issued by the Guangxu Emperor. However, Yuan later said the schemers could not convince him that it was really from the emperor, and when Yuan met with him on 20 September, Guangxu did not say anything about it to Yuan. He then left the emperor to meet with Ronglu and told him about the plot by the reformers, also telling him the emperor had nothing to do with it. Ronglu then met with Cixi and other ministers and princes, and started taking action.

On 21 September, the Guangxu Emperor was detained and met with Empress Dowager Cixi. The following day, he issued a decree that asked Cixi to take control of the government, who proceeded to remove the reform-minded officials and replaced them with conservative loyalists. An edict on 26 September undid some of the more radical changes the emperor had made, while keeping in place those reforms that did not go directly against Qing tradition.

Lei Chia-sheng (雷家聖), a Taiwanese history professor, proposes an alternative view: that the Guangxu Emperor might have been led into a trap by the reformists led by Kang Youwei, who in turn was, in Lei's opinion, tricked by British missionary Timothy Richard and former Japanese prime minister Itō Hirobumi into agreeing to appoint Itō as one of many foreign advisors. British ambassador Claude MacDonald claimed that the reformists had actually "much injured" the modernization of China. Lei claims that Cixi learned of the plot and decided to put an end to it to prevent China from coming under foreign control.

== House arrest after 1898 ==
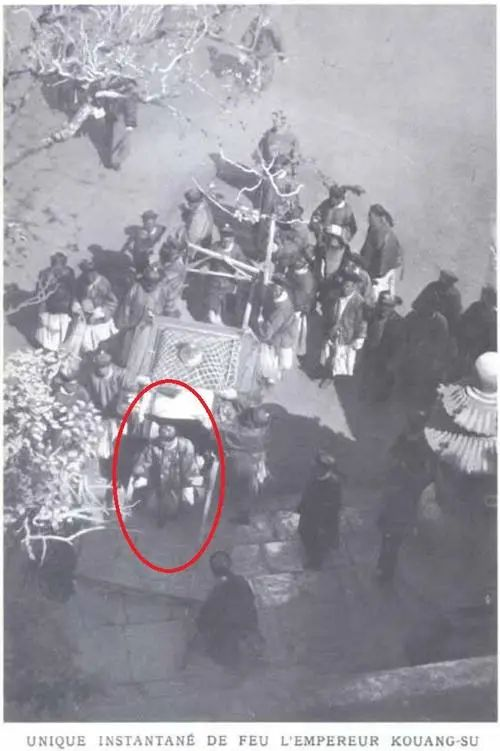
Claimed to be the only photograph of the emperor (1902)

After the coup in 1898, the Guangxu Emperor was kept in confinement on Yingtai Island at Zhongnanhai, near the imperial palace in Beijing.

The emperor was kept informed of state affairs, reading them with Cixi prior to audiences, and was also present at audiences, sitting on a stool to Cixi's left hand while Cixi occupied the main throne. He discharged his ceremonial duties, such as offering sacrifices during ceremonies, but never ruled alone again.

In 1898, shortly after the collapse of the Hundred Days' Reform, the Guangxu Emperor's health began to decline, prompting Cixi to name Pujun, a son of the emperor's cousin, the reactionary Prince Duan, as heir presumptive—Pujun and his father were removed from their positions after the Boxer Rebellion. The emperor was examined by a physician at the French Legation and diagnosed with chronic nephritis; he was also discovered to be impotent at the time.

During the Boxer Rebellion, Emperor Guangxu fiercely opposed the idea of using usurpers as a means to counter foreign invasion. On 14 August 1900, the Guangxu Emperor, along with Cixi, Empress Longyu, and some other court officials, fled from Beijing as the forces of the Eight-Nation Alliance marched on the capital to relieve the legations that had been besieged.

Returning to the capital on 7 January 1902 after the withdrawal of the foreign powers, the Guangxu Emperor spent the next few years working in his isolated palace with watches and clocks, which had been a childhood fascination, some say in an effort to pass the time until Cixi's death. He also read widely and spent time learning English from Cixi's Western-educated lady-in-waiting, Yu Deling. His relationship with Empress Longyu, Cixi's niece (and the Emperor's own first cousin), also improved to some extent.

== Death ==
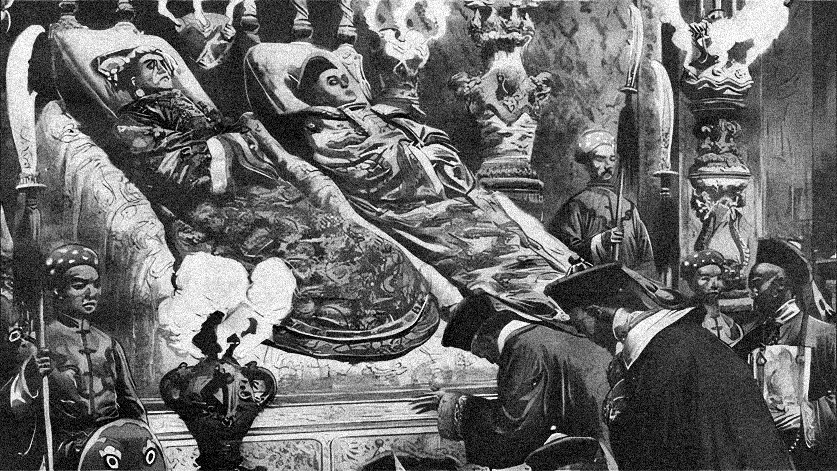
1909 French cut of the Guanxu Emperor and the Dowager Empress Cixi laying in-state

The Guangxu Emperor died suddenly on 14 November 1908 without an heir, at the age of 37, a day before Cixi's death. Due to the sudden unexpected nature of his death, the planning and construction of the Guangxu Emperor's Mausoleum was not completed until seven years later. The dissolution of the Qing Empire in 1912 resulted in the surviving Qing nobility having to request some financial subsidization from the new Republican government to complete its construction.

The Guangxu Emperor, alongside the Empress Dowager Longyu—who also subsequently died childless, a year after the dynasty's abdication—were ultimately interred in the Chong Mausoleum in 1915. The Guangxu Emperor was succeeded by Cixi's choice of heir, his nephew Puyi, who took the regnal name "Xuantong".

=== Post-mortem evaluation of health ===
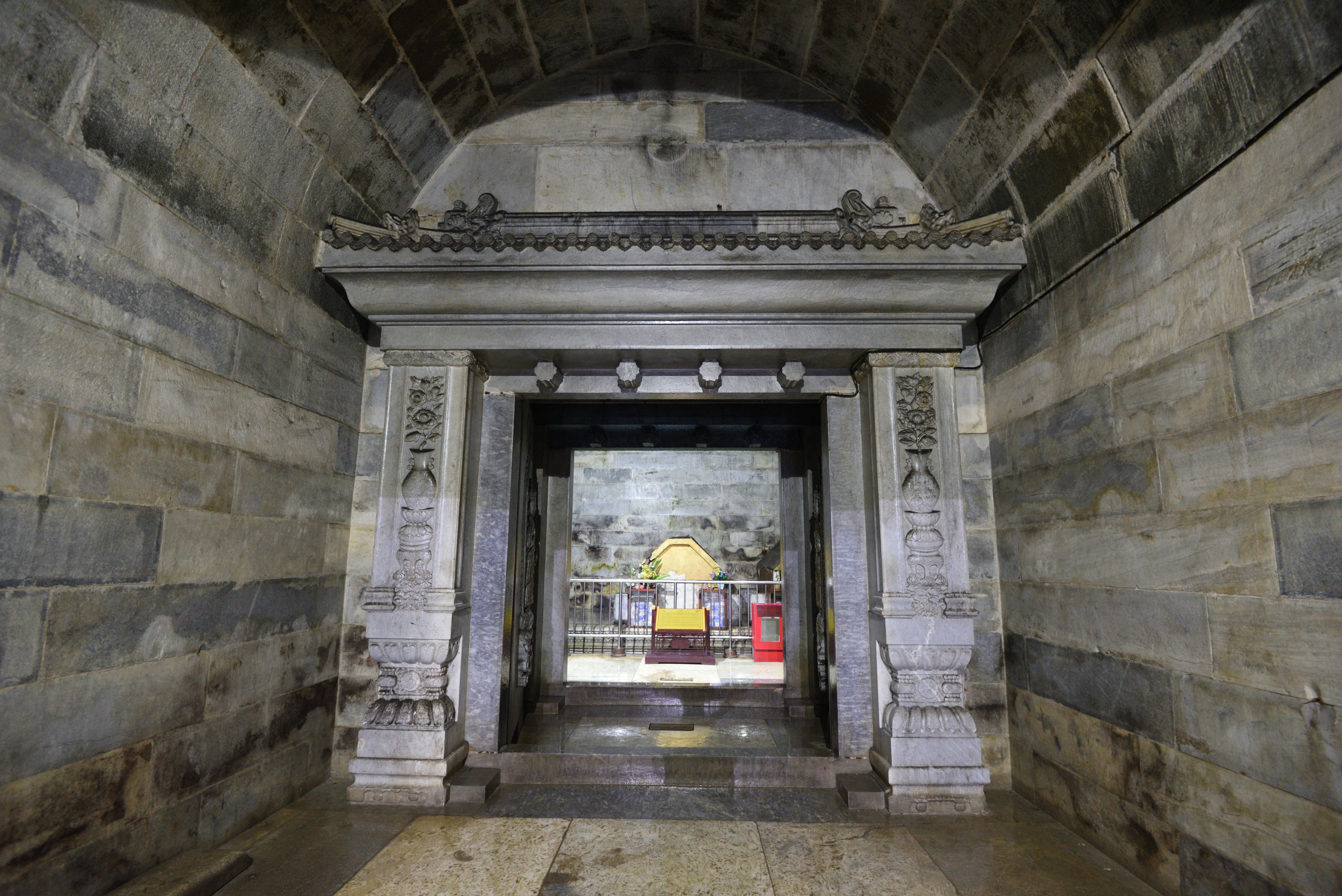
Chong Mausoleum burial chamber

On 4 November 2008, forensic tests revealed that the level of arsenic in the emperor's remains was 2,000 times higher than that of ordinary people. Scientists concluded that the poison could only have been administered in a high dose at one time. For a long time prior to this, there had been several existing theories about the emperor's death, none of which was accepted fully by historians.

Most were inclined to believe that Cixi, herself very ill, poisoned the Guangxu Emperor because she was afraid he would reverse her policies after her death. China Daily quoted a historian, Dai Yi, who speculated that Cixi might have known of her imminent death and worried that the Guangxu Emperor would continue his reforms after her death. Another theory is that the Guangxu Emperor was poisoned by Yuan Shikai, who expected that if the emperor returned to power again, Yuan would likely be convicted, and then executed, for treason. There were no reliable sources to prove who murdered the Guangxu Emperor.

The medical records kept by the Guangxu Emperor's physician show the emperor suffered from "spells of violent stomachaches" and that his face had turned blue, typical symptoms of arsenic poisoning. To dispel persistent rumours that the emperor had been poisoned, the Qing imperial court at the time produced documents and doctors' records suggesting that the Guangxu Emperor died from natural causes, but these did not allay suspicion.

== 1938 mausoleum looting incident ==
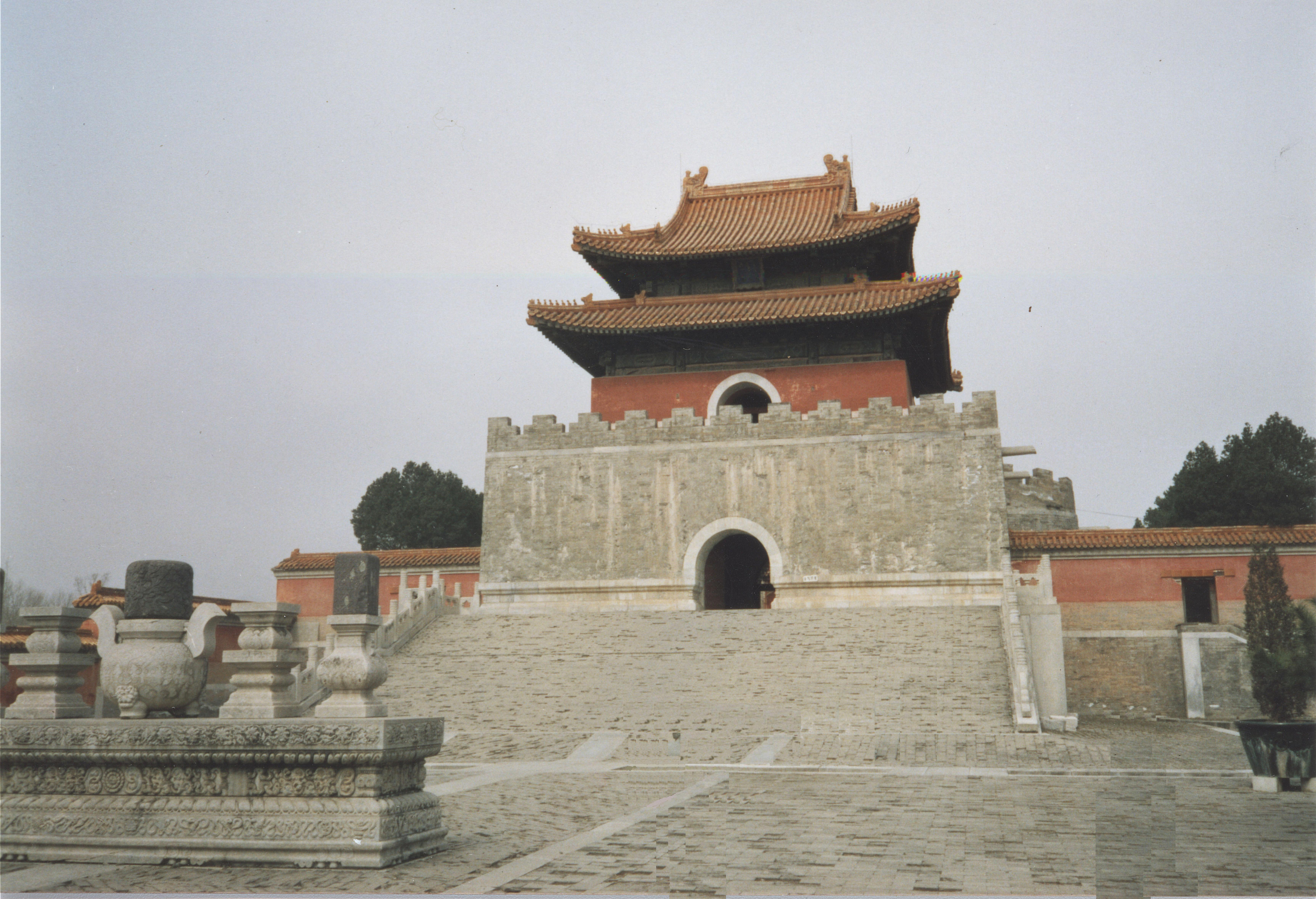
Chongling, mausoleum of the Guangxu Emperor

In 1938, the Chong Mausoleum was broken into and looted. Since the design and layout of the tomb and burial chamber shared very close similarities to the tombs of the Empress Dowager Cixi and the Qianlong Emperor respectively, which were both looted 10 years prior, the perpetrators entered and exited the burial chamber with more surgical precision; they did not use destructive methods such as dynamite, due to the published information gained from the 1928 Eastern Mausoleum looting investigations.

The looters dug a parallel tunnel to bypass the marble sealing wall, carved a hole into the front of the Guangxu Emperor's coffin, and subsequently stole all the burial objects therein. Due to the small scale of the operation, the looting was not discovered for some time and the identity of the perpetrators remains unknown. Emergency excavation, salvage, and restoration works of the burial chamber and coffins of both the Guangxu Emperor and the Empress Dowager Longyu were conducted by the Republican Government, and the mausoleum and burial chamber itself are now open to the public—the only mausoleum in the Western Qing burial complex to be so.

After the defeat and subsequent retreat of the Republican government to Taiwan, the responsibility of security, maintenance, excavation, and upkeep of both the Chong Mausoleum and all other existing imperial tombs sites were transferred to the Mainland government.

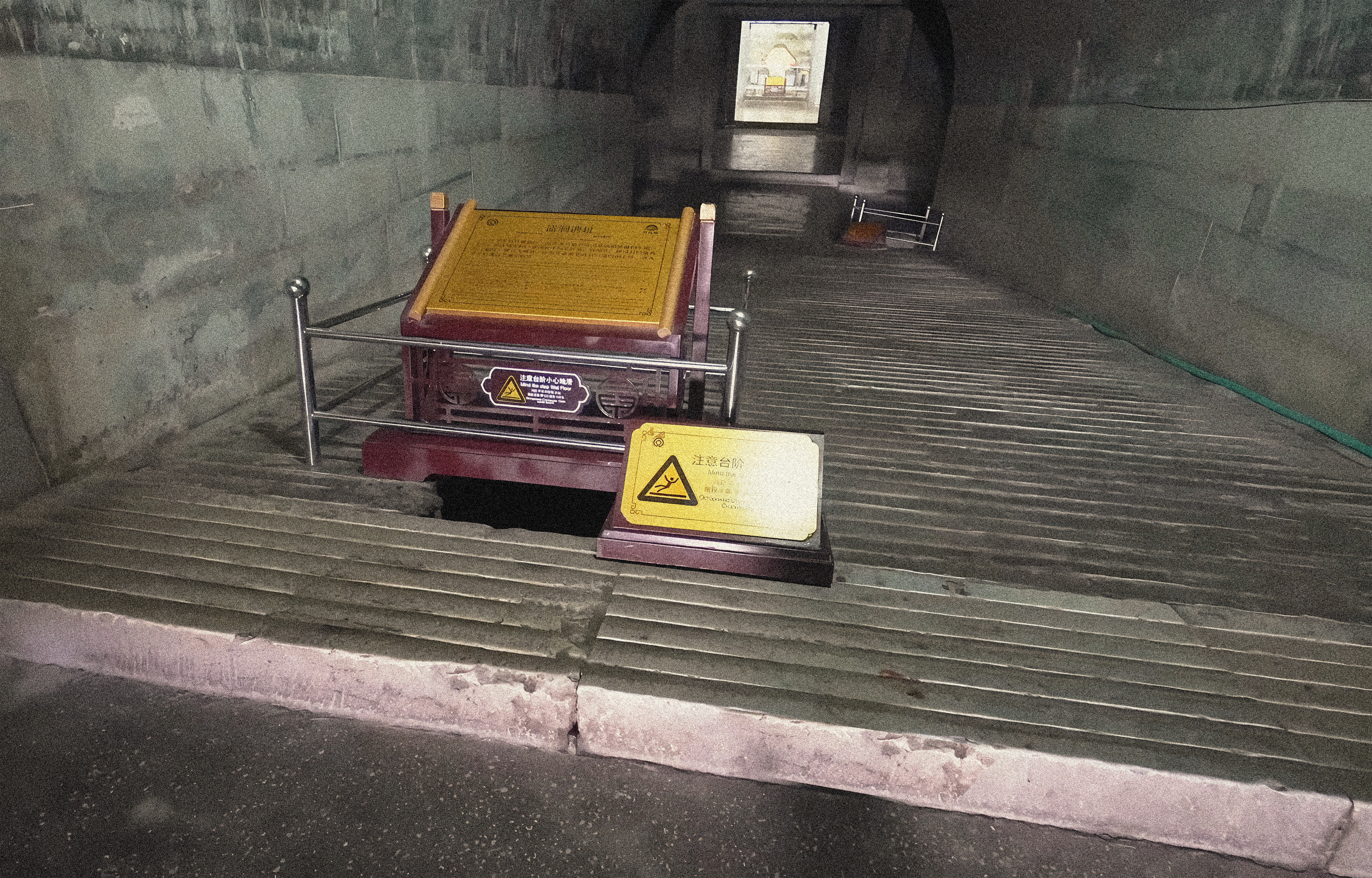
Entry and exit tunnel used by looters to breach the burial chamber

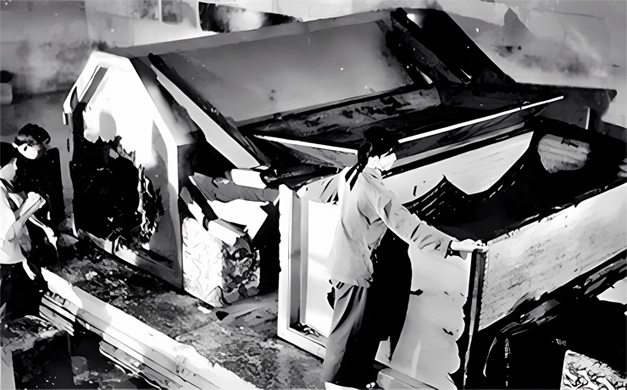
State of the damaged coffin, as photographed as part of the post-1938 looting investigations

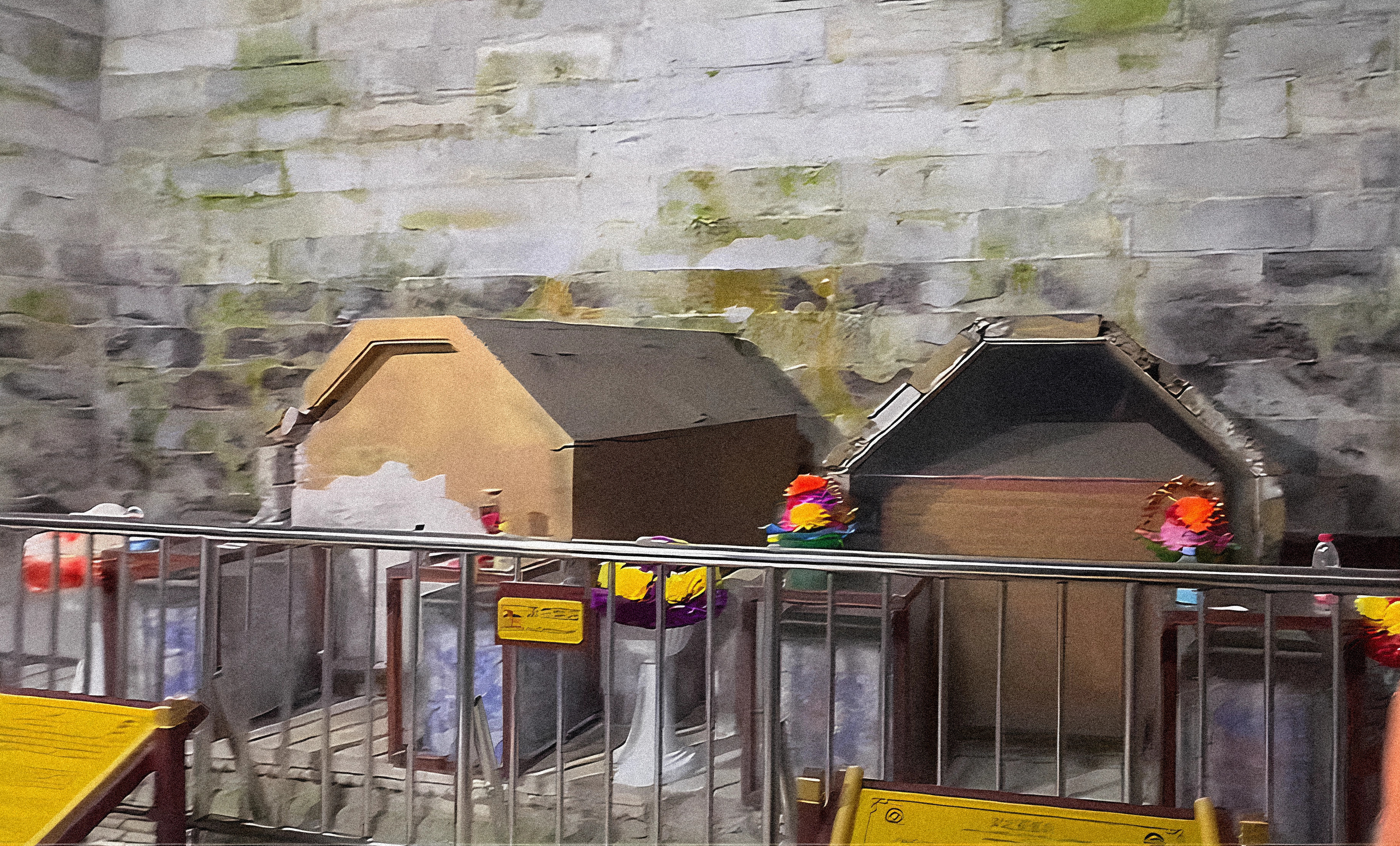
Restored coffin

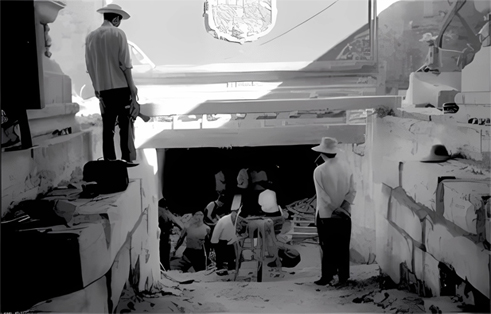
Republican emergency excavation and restoration work of the Guangxu Emperor's tomb after the 1938 looting incident. The burial chamber is now open to the public.

== Legacy ==
In 1912, Sun Yat-sen praised the Guangxu Emperor for his educational reform package that allowed China to learn more about Western culture. After the establishment of the People's Republic of China in 1949, historian Fan Wenlan (范文瀾) called the Guangxu Emperor "a Manchu noble who could accept Western ideas". Some historians believe that the Guangxu Emperor was the first Chinese leader to implement modernizing reforms and capitalism. Imperial power in the Qing dynasty saw its nadir under Guangxu, and he was the only Qing emperor to have been put under house arrest during his own reign.

== Honours ==
Styles of Guangxu Emperor
- Reference style: His Imperial Majesty
- Spoken style: Your Imperial Majesty
- Alternative style: Son of Heaven (天子)

=== Domestic honours ===
- Sovereign of the Order of the Peacock Feather
- Sovereign of the Order of the Blue Feather
- Sovereign of the Order of the Double Dragon

=== Foreign honours ===
- Belgium: Grand Cordon of the Order of Leopold (military), 18 July 1898
- German Empire: Knight of the Order of the Black Eagle, in Diamonds, 28 June 1898
- Kingdom of Hawaii: Knight Grand Cross of the Order of Kamehameha I, 1882
- Empire of Japan: Grand Cordon of the Order of the Chrysanthemum, 29 April 1899
- Kingdom of Portugal: Grand Cross of the Sash of the Three Orders, 1904
- Russian Empire: Order of St. Andrew

== Family ==
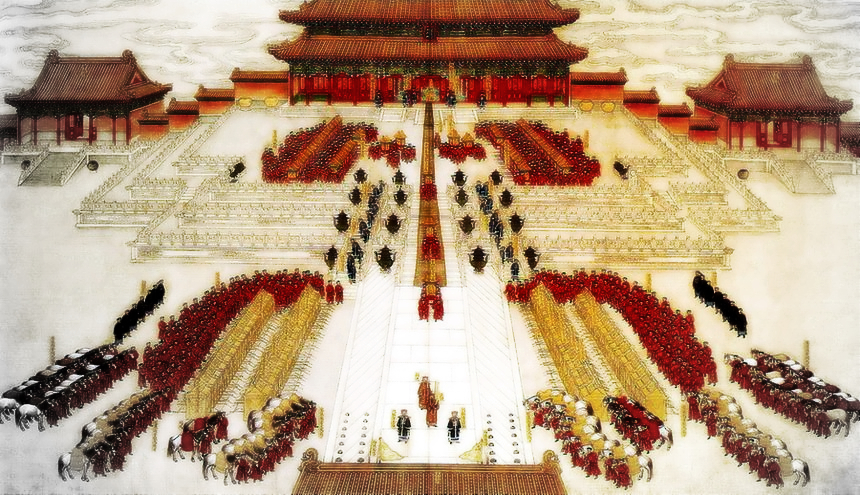
The wedding of the Guangxu Emperor and Empress Xiaodingjing

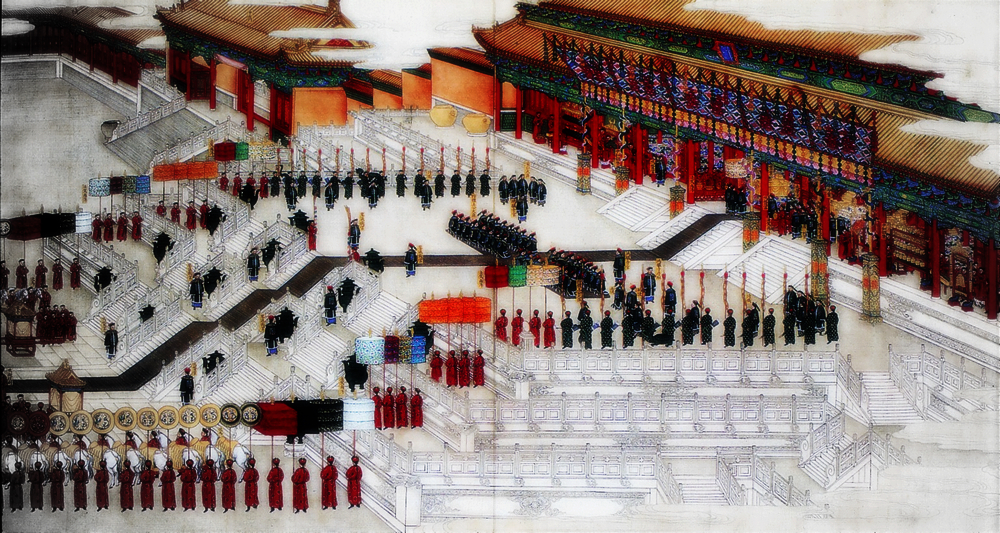
The wedding of the Guangxu Emperor and Empress Xiaodingjing

The Guangxu Emperor had one empress and two consorts in total. The emperor was forced by Empress Dowager Cixi to marry her niece (his cousin) Jingfen, who was two years his senior. Cixi and Jingfen's father, Guixiang (Cixi's younger brother), selected her to be the Guangxu Emperor's wife in order to strengthen the power of their own family. After the marriage, Jingfen was made empress and was granted the honorific title of "Longyu" (隆裕; lit. 'auspicious and prosperous') after the death of her husband.

However, the Guangxu Emperor detested his wife and spent most of his time with his favourite concubine, Consort Zhen (better known as the "Pearl Consort"). Rumours allege that in 1900, Consort Zhen was drowned by being thrown into a well on Cixi's order after she begged Empress Dowager Cixi to let the Guangxu Emperor stay in Beijing for negotiations with the foreign powers. That incident happened when the Imperial Family was preparing to leave the Forbidden City due to the occupation of Beijing by the Eight-Nation Alliance in 1900.

Like his predecessor, the Tongzhi Emperor, the Guangxu Emperor died without issue (an heir). After his death in 1908, Empress Dowager Longyu ruled in cooperation with Zaifeng.

- Empress Xiaodingjing (孝定景皇后), of the Yehe-Nara clan (葉赫那拉氏; 28 January 1868 – 22 February 1913) (Note: First cousin of the Guangxu Emperor.)
- Imperial Noble Consort Wenjing (溫靖皇貴妃), of the Tatara clan (他他拉氏; 6 October 1873 – 24 September 1924)
- Imperial Noble Consort Keshun (恪順皇貴妃), of the Tatara clan (他他拉氏; 27 February 1876 – 15 August 1900)

== See also ==
- Family tree of Chinese monarchs (late)
- List of unsolved murders (1900–1979)

== Bibliography ==
- Elleman, Bruce A. (2001). Modern Chinese Warfare, 1795–1989. Routledge. ISBN 978-0-415-21474-2.
- Kwong, Luke S. K. (1984). A Mosaic of the Hundred Days: Personalities, Politics and Ideas of 1898. Harvard University Press. ISBN 0-674-58742-1.
- Kwong, Luke S. K. (2000). "Chinese Politics at the Crossroads: Reflections on the Hundred Days Reform of 1898". Modern Asian Studies. 34 (3): 663–695. doi:10.1017/S0026749X00003814. JSTOR 313144.
- McCord, Edward A. (1993). The Power of the Gun: The Emergence of Modern Chinese Warlordism. Berkeley, Calif.: University of California Press. ISBN 978-0-520-08128-4.
- Morse, Hosea Ballou (1918a). The International Relations of the Chinese Empire. Vol. II: The Period of Submission, 1861–1893. Longmans, Green, and Company.
- Morse, Hosea Ballou (1918b). The International Relations of the Chinese Empire. Vol. III: The Period of Subjugation, 1894–1911. Longmans, Green, and Company.
- Paine, S. C. M. (2003). The Sino-Japanese War of 1894–1895: Perceptions, Power, and Primacy. Cambridge University Press. ISBN 978-0-521-81714-1.
- Rhoads, Edward J. M. (2000). Manchus and Han: Ethnic Relations and Political Power in Late Qing and Early Republican China, 1861–1928. Seattle: University of Washington Press. ISBN 978-0-295-99748-3.
- Seagrave, Sterling (1992). Dragon Lady: The Life and Legend of the Last Empress of China. Knopf. ISBN 978-0-679-40230-5.
- Shan, Patrick Fuliang (2018). Yuan Shikai: A Reappraisal. Vancouver: University of British Columbia Press. ISBN 978-0-7748-3778-1.

Guangxu Emperor House of Aisin Gioro Born: 14 August 1871 Died: 14 November 1908
Regnal titles
| Preceded by Tongzhi Emperor | Emperor of China; Emperor of the Qing dynasty 1875–1908 | Succeeded by Xuantong Emperor |
