= Bluebell M. Hunter =

English novelist (1878 – 1960)

Bluebell M. Hunter (1878 – 1960) was an English writer of science fiction, fantasy, and detective fiction who wrote under several pseudonyms.

She was born Matilda Maya Angela Antonia Williams and married civil servant Hugh Stewart Hunter. Their son was barrister Muir Hunter.

She was an acquaintance of H.G. Wells, who wrote to her that her name was 'at the heart' of his library and that 'Never if I live to be a thousand years old shall I have so PERFECTLY LOVELY a book dedicated to me again as Death Turns the Tide [sic].'

== Works ==
=== As George Lancing: Science fiction and historical fiction set in China ===
- Infamous Conduct (1934)
- Fraudulent Conversion: A Romance of the Gold Standard (1935)
- Madame Manchu
- The Eunuch
- Mating of the Dragon (1946)
- Dragon in Chains (1947)

=== As John Guildford: Fantasy and detective fiction ===
- The Death Cat
- Big Ben Looks On
- Death Dams the Tide

She also wrote as Basil Hunter and as Boris M. Hunter for magazines.
