= Consorts of the Xianfeng Emperor =

The Xianfeng Emperor of the Qing dynasty of China had eighteen imperial consorts, including three empresses, two imperial noble consorts, two noble consorts, four consorts, four concubines and three first class attendants.

== Empresses ==
1. Empress Xiaodexian, of the Sakda clan
2. Empress Xiaozhenxian, of the Niohuru clan
3. Empress Xiaoqinxian, of the Yehe Nara clan

== Imperial Noble Consorts ==
1. Imperial Noble Consort Zhuangjing, of the Tatara clan
2. Imperial Noble Consort Duanke, of the Tunggiya clan

== Noble Consorts ==
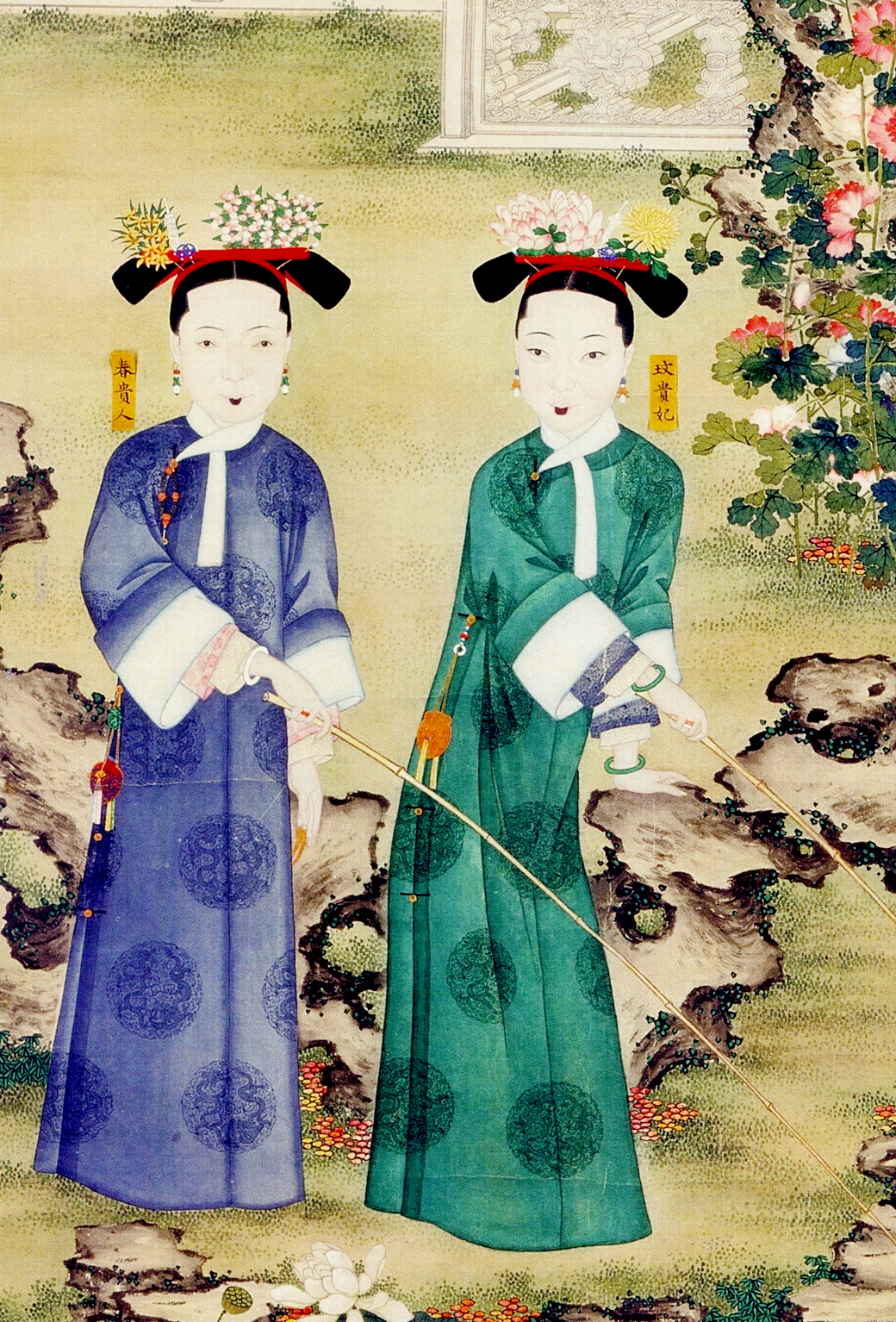
Noble Consort Mei fishing with Noble Lady Chun

1. Noble Consort Mei, of the Xu clan
2. Noble Consort Wan, of the Socoro clan

== Consorts ==
All consorts were palace maids known as Four Spring Ladies. The name of the clique was derived from their personal names and a poem line "When four springs follow upwards the wind, the copper fish swims in the water every five nights".

《袅袅四春随风撵，沈沈五夜递铜鱼》

The consorts were promoted together within one year. The highest title they held during the Xianfeng era was noble lady.

1. Consort Lu, of the Yehe Nara clan, personal name Mudanchun (牡丹春)
2. Consort Ji, of the Wang clan, personal name Xinghuachun (杏花春)
3. Consort Xi, of the Cahala clan, personal name Haitangchun (海棠春)
4. Consort Qing, of the Zhang clan, personal name Wulingchun (武陵春)

== Concubines ==
1. Concubine Yun, of the Ugiya clan, personal name Qiyun (綺雲)
1. Concubine Rong, of the Irgen Gioro clan
1. Concubine Shu, of the Yehe Nara clan
2. Concubine Yu, of the Yehe Nara clan

== First Class Attendants ==
=== 1. First Class Attendant Chun ===
First Class Attendant Chun (瑃常在 暝谙氏; 1835–1859), of the Ming'an clan, didn't have her name recorded in history.

==== Daoguang era ====
First Class Attendant Chun was born in 1835, which translates to 15th year of the Daoguang era. Her family background is not mentioned.

==== Xianfeng era ====
Lady Ming'an entered the palace at the same time as most of the Xianfeng Emperor's consorts, including Empress Dowager Cixi, Imperial Noble Consort Zhuangjing, Noble Consort Mei and Noble Consort Wan. She was granted a title of Noble Lady Chun (春贵人; meaning "spring") upon the entry in 1852. In 1853, she was demoted to First Class Attendant Chun (春常在). In 1855, the Head of Palace Administration Zhang Xin proclaimed an edict demoting her further to Second Class Attendant without the right to a honorific name. As a substitution for the honorific name, the two characters of her clan name were used. At that time, she had one personal maid and her allowance was 50 taels. In 1856, Lady Ming'an was restored as First Class Attendant Chun (瑃常在). She died in 1859 and was interred in the Ding Mausoleum of the Eastern Qing tombs in 1865.

=== 2. First Class Attendant Xin ===
First Class Attendant Xin (鑫常在 戴佳氏; d. 27 May 1859), of the Daigiya clan, was a member of Sinjeku caste of the Plain White Banner.

==== Family background ====
Father: Jilu (吉禄), served as a slave of Plain White Banner (披甲人)

Two brothers

==== Xianfeng era ====
Lady Daigiya entered the palace in 1852 and was bestowed a title of First Class Attendant Xin (鑫常在). As the first to enter the palace, Lady Daigiya was made an informal leader of first class attendants.

On 25 June 1857, her personal maid, Daniu, was expelled from palace because of leg ailment. However, it was suspected that the actual reason behind Daniu's removal from service differed from the declared recuperation.

Lady Daigiya died on 27 May 1859 and her coffin was interred in Ding Mausoleum of the Eastern Qing tombs.

=== 3. First Class Attendant Ping ===
First Class Attendant Ping (玶常在 伊尔根觉罗氏; d. 1856) of the Irgen Gioro clan, didn't have her name recorded in history.

==== Family background ====
- Father: Yanchang (彥昌, b. 1816), served as banquet manager in Guozijian and received a jinshi degree in 1847
  - Grandfather: Yingchun (英淳), served as 7th rank civil official (筆貼士)
  - Grandmother: Lady Ujaku (烏扎庫氏)
- Mother: Lady Donggo

==== Xianfeng era ====
Lady Irgen-Gioro entered the palace in 1852 and was given the title "Noble Lady Ying" (英貴人). In March 1852, Noble Lady Ying received one black lacquered copper clock. In October 1852, Lady Irgen-Gioro was promoted to Concubine Ying (英嬪). In October 1853, she was demoted to Noble Lady Yi (伊貴人) to fulfill the limit of six concubines. On 11 January 1855，during the burial of Concubine Yun all imperial consorts stayed in Tiancun Village. Noble Lady Yi, who arrived from Ji'an Studio, departed for the Forbidden City earlier than other consorts. In March 1855, she was demoted to First Class Attendant Yi because of her behavior during the funeral. In January 1857, Lady Irgen-Gioro was demoted to Second Class Attendant. Second Attendant Yi fell ill in May 1856 and was suddenly restored as First Class Attendant Ping (玶常在; "ping" meaning a kind of fine jade). First Class Attendant Ping died on 15 August 1856 and was buried in Xihua Garden in Tiancun on 27 August 1856. Her coffin was interred in the Ding Mausoleum in 1864.

== Gallery ==
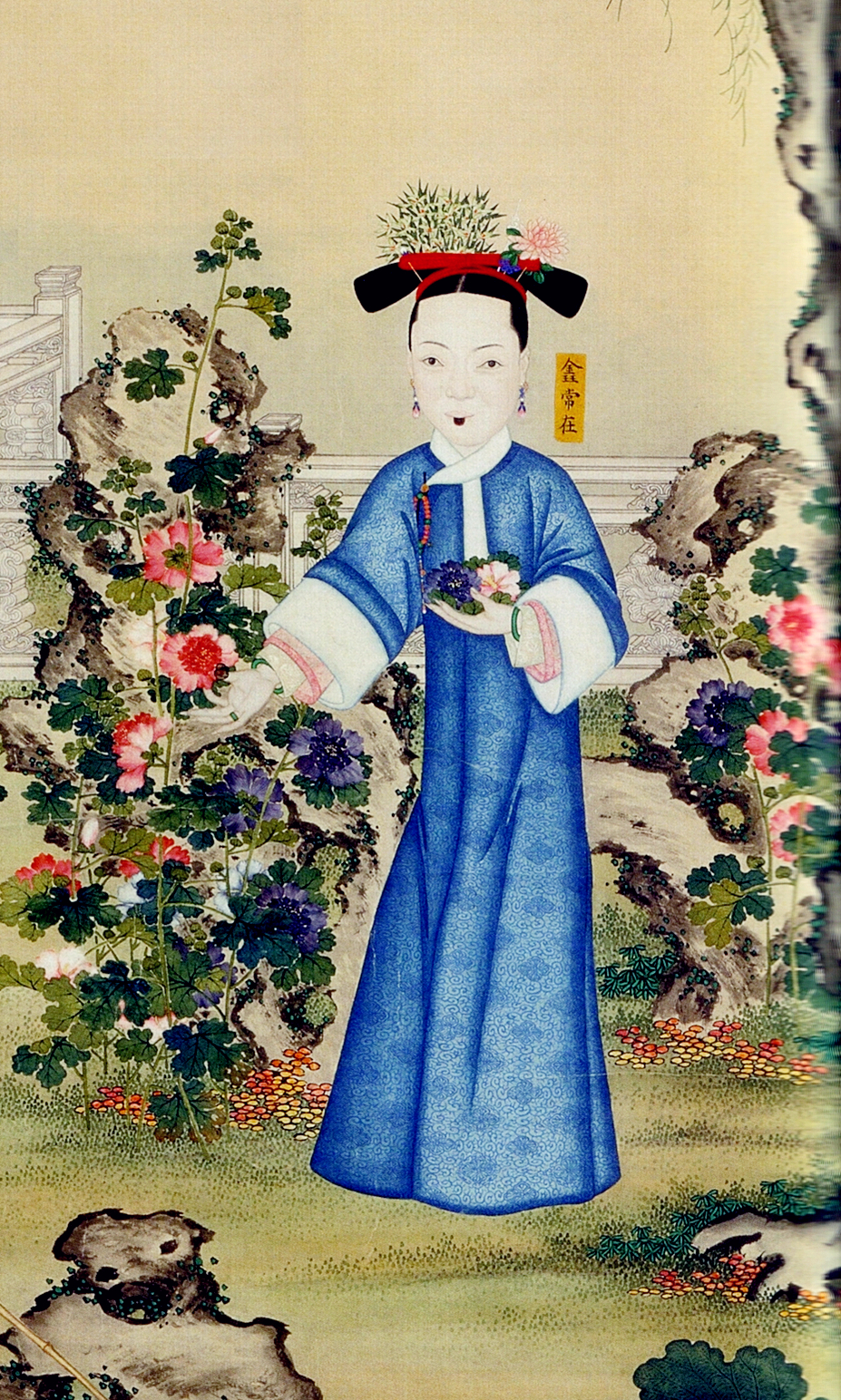
First Class Attendant Xin near the peonies

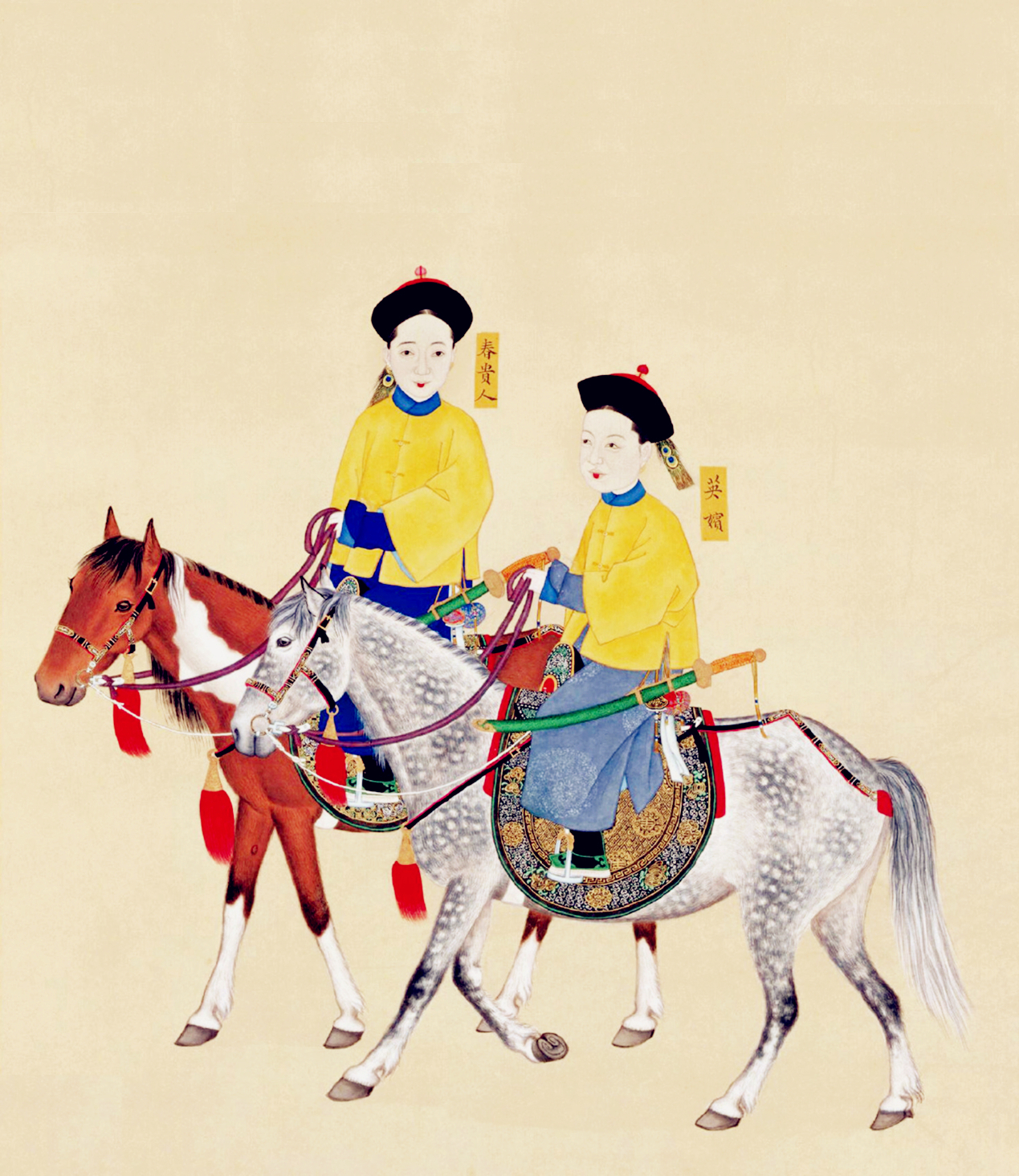
Concubine Ying and Noble Lady Chun during the imperial hunt

== Residences in the Forbidden City of the imperial consorts ==
Year	Imperial consort	Palace
1852–1861	Empress Dowager Ci'an	Palace of Accumulated Purity (锺粹宫; Zhōngcuì gōng)
1852–1853	Concubine Yun	Palace of Accumulated Purity (锺粹宫; Zhōngcuì gōng)
1858–1861	Consort Ji	Palace of Accumulated Purity (锺粹宫; Zhōngcuì gōng)
1852–1861	Imperial Noble Consort Zhuangshun	Palace of Eternal Harmony (永和宫; Yǒnghé gōng)
1853–1859	First Class Female Attendant Xin	Palace of Eternal Harmony (永和宫; Yǒnghé gōng)
1852–1861	Noble Consort Mei	Palace of Eternal Harmony (永和宫; Yǒnghé gōng)
1853–1855	Concubine Yun	Palace of Heavenly Grace (承乾宫; Chéngqián gōng)
1852–1855	Noble Consort Wan	Palace of Heavenly Grace (承乾宫; Chéngqián gōng)
1852	First Class Attendant Chun	Palace of Heavenly Grace (承乾宫; Chéngqián gōng)
1858–1861	Imperial Noble Consort Duanke	Palace of Heavenly Grace (承乾宫; Chéngqián gōng)
1852–1861	Empress Dowager Cixi	Palace of Gathering Elegance (储秀宫; Chǔxiù gōng)
1852–1856	First Class Attendant Ping	Palace of Gathering Elegance (储秀宫; Chǔxiù gōng)
1855–1861	Consort Lu	Palace of Gathering Elegance (储秀宫; Chǔxiù gōng)
1855–1861	Consort Xi	Palace of Gathering Elegance (储秀宫; Chǔxiù gōng)
1859–1861	Concubine Yu	Palace of Gathering Elegance (储秀宫; Chǔxiù gōng)
1856–1861	Concubine Shu	Palace of Gathering Elegance (储秀宫; Chǔxiù gōng)
1855–1861	Noble Consort Wan	Palace of Great Benevolence (景仁宫; Jǐngrén gōng)
1852–1859	First Class Attendant Chun	Palace of Earthly Honour (翊坤宫; Yìkūn gōng)
1852–1861	Concubine Rong	—N/a
