= Concubine Rong =

Consort of the Xianfeng Emperor

- 容嫔
- Born: 6 July 1837
- Died: 21 June 1869 (aged 31)
- Spouse: Xianfeng Emperor
- House: Irgen Gioro
- Father: Sarhanga (萨尔杭阿)
- Mother: Lady Luo (骆氏)

Concubine Rong, of the Irgen Gioro clan (容嬪 / 容嫔, 伊爾根覺羅氏 / 伊尔根觉罗氏; 6 July 1837 – 21 June 1869) was a consort of the Xianfeng Emperor.

== Life ==
=== Family background ===
Concubine Rong was a booi hehe of Bordered Yellow Banner.

- Father: Sarhangga (薩爾杭阿; 1796- June 1838), served as a teacher in Xian'an Palace (咸安宮) since 1826, was granted 7th civil rank in 1831, became promoted to 6th civil rank in 1836.
  - Paternal grandfather: Tuan'erhai (慱爾嗐), served as 6th rank tutor (教習) of Ministry of Personnel
- Mother: Lady Luo (駱氏)

=== Daoguang era ===
Lady Irgen Gioro was born on 6 July 1837. When her father died in June 1838, Lady Irgen Gioro and her mother, lady Luo, lived in poverty, enjoying an income of 1 tael monthly. Since 1839, Lady Irgen Gioro with her mother have been receiving a social rent consisting of money and crops.

=== Xianfeng Era ===
Lady Irgen Gioro entered the imperial harem in September 1853 and was bestowed a title of First Class Female Attendant Rong (容常在; tolerant, pretty). Her half-length portrait was hung in the Ruyi pavilion (如意舘) shortly after the entry. In November 1855, First Attendant Rong was promoted to Noble Lady Rong (容貴人) together with majority of Xianfeng Emperor's concubines. She remained childless during the Xianfeng era.

=== Tongzhi era ===
Noble Lady Rong was promoted to Dowager Concubine Rong (皇考容嬪) in 1861. Although Noble Lady Rong was conferred a title of Concubine, Ministry of Internal Affairs delayed production of sedan chair and gilded promotional document, which was investigated by Ministry of Rites in 1868.

Concubine Rong died on 21 June 1869. Her coffin was transferred to Ji'an study for lying in state. Consort Xi and Consort Qing left the Imperial Palace so as to guard Concubine Rong's coffin. The coffin was temporarily placed in the Tiancun village and thereafter interred in Ding Mausoleum of Eastern Qing tombs. Concubine Rong's personal maids were married off.
