= Consort Ji =

Consort Ji may refer to:

- Consort Ji (Hong Taiji) (fl. 17th century), concubine of Hong Taiji
- Consort Ji, of the Wang clan (1846–1905), concubine of the Xianfeng Emperor

== See also ==
- Consort Qi (disambiguation)
- Many consorts in ancient (pre-Qin) China were surnamed Ji, like Li Ji (concubine), Fan Ji, Xia Ji, etc.
