= First Class Attendant Chun =

Concubine of Emperor Xianfeng (died 1859)

Unknown
- First Class Attendant Chun
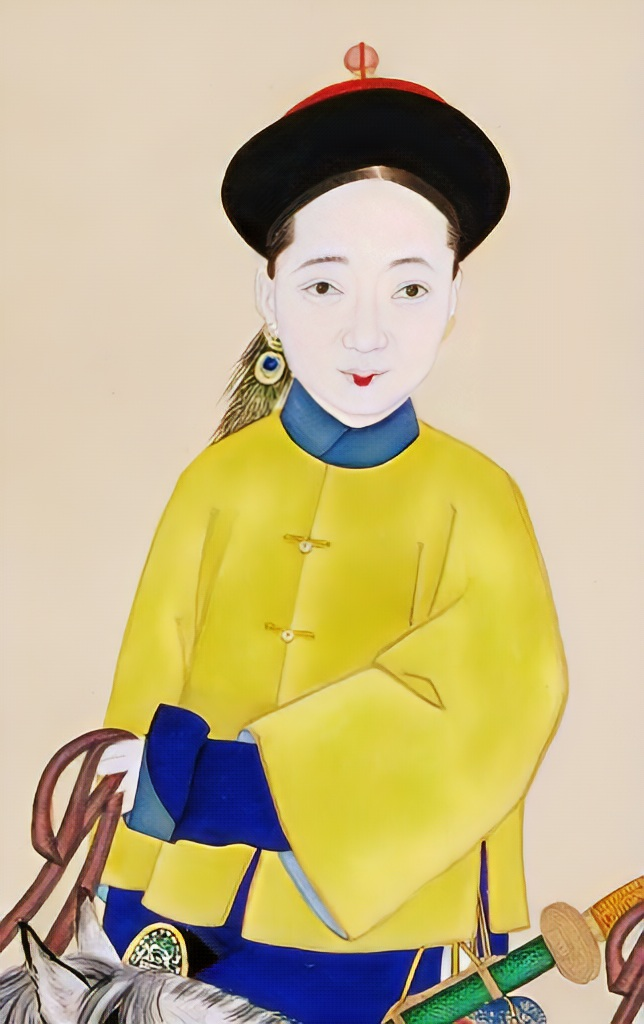
- Died: January 4, 1859
- Spouse: Emperor Xianfeng

First Class Attendant Chun (died January 4, 1859) was a concubine of Emperor Xianfeng during the Qing Dynasty. She was born into the Min'an clan (also known as the Ming'an clan) and was part of the Manchu Bordered Yellow Banner.

She was a concubine of Emperor Xianfeng.

== Life ==
She was selected as a consort of Emperor Xianfeng and initially granted the title Noble Lady Chun in 1852, during the second year of his reign. Between April and May 1852, she and five other concubines entered the Yuanmingyuan (Old Summer Palace), where Emperor Xianfeng resided.

On May 11, 1852, Noble Lady Chun and Attendant Wan were each assigned four new palace maids, and the next day, they officially entered Yuanmingyuan. Following their return to the main palace, She, First Class Attendant Wan, and Imperial Concubine Yun were housed together in Chengqian Palace. However, when Emperor Xianfeng distributed calligraphy of the characters "Fortune" (福) and "Longevity" (寿) to his consorts, Noble Lady Chun was notably absent from the recipient list.

On September 2, 1853, she was demoted to Attendant Chun. The following day, she was further demoted to Attendant Ming, while Imperial Concubine Ying was downgraded to Noble Lady Yi.

In October 1853, Attendant Ming became involved in an investigation regarding missing palace jewelry, including a pair of gold bracelets and a gold hair ornament. The inquiry revealed that eunuch Wang Lihua had taken the items, claiming they were needed as samples. Upon interrogation, Wang Lihua admitted that he had pawned the items due to debt but later repurchased them and sold them for silver. After failing to provide further explanations, he attempted to flee but was captured by authorities.

By 1855, Chun Changzai had moved to Jingren Palace and on February 24, 1855, she was further demoted to Acknowledged Lady Ming, while Noble Lady Yi was downgraded to Attendant Yi. Chun Changzai's new title, "Ming'an", was derived from the Manchu word for "one thousand" (minggan), which was also her surname. Although her rank dictated a lower allocation of palace servants, her allowance remained the same as an Attendant, rather than an Acknowledged Lady.

On May 25, 1856, Acknowledged Lady Ming was reinstated as Attendant Chun, while Acknowledged Lady Yi was elevated to Attendant Ping.

== Death and Burial ==
First Class Attendant Chun died on January 4, 1859. Following her death, her painted coffin was placed temporarily for mourning on January 15, 1859.

On September 25, 1865, during the fourth year of Emperor Tongzhi's reign, First Class Attendant Chun was officially interred in the Imperial Mausoleum for Concubines.
