= Consort Yun =

Consort Yun or Queen Yun may refer to:

== Korea ==
- Hui-bi Yun (died 1380), wife of Chunghye of Goryeo
- Queen Jeonghui (1418–1483), consort of Sejo of Joseon
- Deposed Queen Yun (1455–1482), second wife of Seongjong of Joseon
- Queen Jeonghyeon (1462–1530), third wife of Seongjong of Joseon
- Queen Janggyeong (Joseon) (1491–1515), second queen of Jungjong of Joseon
- Queen Munjeong (1501–1565), third queen of Jungjong of Joseon
- Crown Princess Gonghoebin (1553–1592), wife of Crown Prince Sunhoe
- Royal Noble Consort Hwabin Yun (1765–1824), concubine of Jeongjo of Joseon
- Empress Sunjeonghyo (1894–1966), wife of Emperor Yunghui

== China ==
- Concubine Yun (Qing dynasty) (died 1856), concubine of the Xianfeng Emperor
