= Consort Qing =

Consort Qing may refer to:

- Imperial Noble Consort Qinggong (1724–1774), concubine of the Qianlong Emperor
- Consort Qing (Xianfeng) (1840–1885), concubine of the Xianfeng Emperor
