= Imperial Noble Consort Zhuangjing =

Consort of the Xianfeng Emperor (1837–1890)

- Born: 2 April 1837 (道光十七年 二月 二十七日)
- Died: 26 December 1890 (aged 53) (光緒十六年 十一月 十五日); Forbidden City
- Burial: Ding Mausoleum, Eastern Qing tombs
- Spouse: Xianfeng Emperor (m. 1852; died 1861)
- Issue: Princess Rong'an of the First Rank
Posthumous name
- Imperial Noble Consort Zhuangjing (莊靜皇貴妃)
- House: Tatara (他他拉; by birth); Aisin Gioro (by marriage)
- Father: Qinghai

Imperial Noble Consort Zhuangjing
- Traditional Chinese: 莊靜皇貴妃
- Simplified Chinese: 庄静皇贵妃
Transcriptions
Standard Mandarin
- Hanyu Pinyin: Zhuāngjìng Huángguìfēi

Imperial Noble Consort Zhuangjing (2 April 1837 – 26 December 1890), of the Manchu Plain Red Banner Tatara clan, was a consort of the Xianfeng Emperor. She was six years his junior.

== Life ==
=== Family background ===
Imperial Noble Consort Zhuangjing's personal name was not recorded in history.

- Father: Qinghai (慶海), served as a sixth rank literary official (主事)

=== Daoguang era ===
The future Imperial Noble Consort Zhuangjing was born on the 27th day of the second lunar month in the 17th year of the reign of the Daoguang Emperor, which translates to 2 April 1837 in the Gregorian calendar.

=== Xianfeng era ===
On 26 June 1852, Lady Tatara entered the Forbidden City and was granted the title "Noble Lady Li" by the Xianfeng Emperor. During Lady Tatara's time as a consort of the Xianfeng Emperor, she was said to be the most beautiful woman in the Imperial City and was bestowed with a natural grace and allure. Written descriptions about the beauty of Lady Tatara are among the most illustrious and elaborate of Qing dynasty historical texts; they somewhat differ from the passive mentions of beauty and virtue in descriptions of other Qing dynasty imperial consorts and better resemble vivid descriptions of beauties in the historical records of earlier Han Chinese-led dynasties.

On 10 February 1855, Lady Tatara was elevated to "Concubine Li". On 20 June 1855, she gave birth to the emperor's only daughter, Princess Rong'an of the First Rank. Due to the emperor's intense and near monopolic love for her, their daughter was made a first rank princess against tradition. According to Qing dynasty imperial regulations, only the daughters of empresses were qualified to be first rank princesses; all other daughters of the emperor were to be second rank princesses.

On 4 February 1856, Lady Tatara was elevated to "Consort Li". It is said that Lady Tatara was the Xianfeng Emperor's favourite and most charming consort, and that he spent most of his nights with her. On the other hand, Lady Yehe Nara, another of the emperor's consorts, only caught the emperor's attention during and after Lady Tatara's pregnancy. This was because the emperor was not allowed to have sexual relations with Lady Tatara in the 100 days after she gave birth.

In 1860, Lady Tatara fled with the Xianfeng Emperor, his empress consort, and other consorts to Rehe Province when Anglo-French forces closed in on Beijing during the Second Opium War.

=== Tongzhi era ===
The Xianfeng Emperor died on 22 August 1861 and was succeeded by Lady Yehe Nara's son, Zaichun, who was enthroned as the Tongzhi Emperor. Because Lady Tatara had served the Xianfeng Emperor for many years, and was widely acknowledged as the emperor's favourite consort, she was elevated to " “Imperial Noble Consort Dowager Li". During this time, she lived in the Palace of Eternal Harmony (永和宮) in the eastern part of the Forbidden City.

=== Guangxu era ===
The Tongzhi Emperor died on 12 January 1875 and was succeeded by his cousin Zaitian, who was enthroned as the Guangxu Emperor. Lady Tatara's daughter died on 5 February 1875 after suffering a miscarriage upon hearing news of the death of her brother (the Tongzhi Emperor).

Official histories recorded that Lady Tatara was often sick and she died from illness on 26 December 1890. The Guangxu Emperor ordered members of the imperial clan and officials to wear mourning garments for a day. In 1893, Lady Tatara was buried in the Ding Mausoleum of the Eastern Qing tombs, alongside Noble Consort Wen, who died seven days before her. She was granted the posthumous title "Imperial Noble Consort Zhuangjing".

== Titles ==
- During the reign of the Daoguang Emperor (r. 1820–1850):
  - Lady Tatara (from 2 April 1837)
- During the reign of the Xianfeng Emperor (r. 1850–1861):
  - Noble Lady Li (麗貴人; from 26 June 1852), sixth rank consort
  - Concubine Li (麗嬪; from 10 February 1855), fifth rank consort
  - Consort Li (麗妃; from 4 February 1856), fourth rank consort
- During the reign of the Tongzhi Emperor (r. 1861–1875):
  - Imperial Noble Consort Dowager Li (麗皇貴太妃; from 12 November 1861), second rank consort
- During the reign of the Guangxu Emperor (r. 1875–1908):
  - Imperial Noble Consort Zhuangjing (莊靜皇貴妃; from 1890)

== Issue ==
- As Concubine Li:
  - Princess Rong'an of the First Rank (榮安固倫公主; 20 June 1855 – 5 February 1875), the Xianfeng Emperor's first daughter
    - Married Fuzhen (d. 1909) of the Manchu Gūwalgiya clan in September/October 1873

== In fiction and popular culture ==
- Portrayed by Chow Kit in The Burning of Imperial Palace (1983) and Reign Behind a Curtain (1983)
- Portrayed by Bai Qinglin in Sigh of His Highness (2006)

== See also ==
- Ranks of imperial consorts in China#Qing
- Royal and noble ranks of the Qing dynasty
