= Consort Qi =

Consort Qi may refer to:

== Consorts with the surname Qi ==
- Consort Qi (Han dynasty) (224–194 BC), concubine of Emperor Gaozu of Han
- Empress Qi (fl. 412), wife of Yao Xing (Emperor Wenhuan of Later Qin)

== Consorts with the title Consort Qi ==
- Consort Qi (Yongzheng) (1676–1739), concubine of the Yongzheng Emperor
- Imperial Noble Consort Duanke (1844–1910), concubine of the Xianfeng Emperor

== See also ==
- Empress Gi (1315–1369), empress of Toghon Temür of the Yuan dynasty, Gi is pronounced Qi in Chinese
