= Imperial Noble Consort Duanke =

Consort of the Xianfeng Emperor (1844–1910)

- Born: 3 December 1844; Jinling (present day Nanjing), Qing China
- Died: 7 May 1910 (aged 65); Forbidden City, Beijing, Qing China
- Burial: Ding Mausoleum, Western Qing tombs
- Spouse: Xianfeng Emperor (m. 1858; died 1861)
Posthumous name
- Imperial Noble Consort Duanke (端恪皇貴妃)
- House: Tunggiya (佟佳; by birth); Aisin Gioro (by marriage)
- Father: Yuxiang (裕祥)

Imperial Noble Consort Duanke
- Traditional Chinese: 端恪皇貴妃
- Simplified Chinese: 端恪皇贵妃
Transcriptions
Standard Mandarin
- Hanyu Pinyin: Duānkè Huángguìfēi

Imperial Noble Consort Duanke (3 December 1844 – 7 May 1910), of the Manchu Tunggiya clan, was a consort of the Xianfeng Emperor of the Qing dynasty of China.

== Life ==
=== Family background ===
Imperial Noble Consort Duanke was a member of a prominent Manchu Tunggiya clan. Her personal name wasn't recorded in history.

Father: Yuxiang (裕祥), served as a leader of imperial guards (Chinese: 头等侍卫; pinyin: Tóuděng shìwèi).

=== Daoguang era ===
Imperial Noble Consort Duanke was born on 3 December 1844 in Jinling (present day Nanjing).

=== Xianfeng era ===
Lady Tunggiya entered the Forbidden City in 1858 at the age of fourteen, and was granted the title "Concubine Qi" (棋嫔). According to the poem "鸿称通用“ (”Swangoose sees through needs") of the Ministry of Internal Affairs, "qi" means "fortune". Her residence in the Forbidden city was Palace of Celestial Favor (Chinese: 承乾宫; pinyin: Chéng gān gōng).

=== Tongzhi era ===
In November 1861, Concubine Qi was promoted to "Consort Qi" (棋妃). According to the medical records, lady Tunggiya suffered from depression and anemia in 1862. She moved to the Eastern Longevity palace as a concubine of former emperor. In December 1874, Consort Qi was promoted to "Noble Consort Qi" (棋贵妃).

=== Guangxu era ===
In 1908, Noble Consort Qi was promoted to "Dowager Imperial Noble Consort Qi" (棋皇贵太妃) by Empress Dowager Cixi.

=== Xuantong era ===
In 1910, lady Tunggiya fell critically ill before the sacrificial ceremony performed in Jingshan eastern grieving palace. She died on 7 May 1910. She was posthumously honoured as "Imperial Noble Consort Duanke" (端恪皇貴妃). Her newly created golden insignia were presented in front of the coffin by the suggestion of the Ministry of Rites, as it was done for Qianlong Emperor's Noble Consort Xin. In 1911, Imperial Noble Consort Duanke was interred in Ding Mausoleum in Eastern Qing tombs.

== Titles ==
- During the reign of the Daoguang Emperor (r. 1820–1850):
  - Lady Tunggiya (from 3 December 1844)
- During the reign of the Xianfeng Emperor (r. 1850–1861):
  - Concubine Qi (棋嫔; from 1858), fifth rank consort
- During the reign of the Tongzhi Emperor (r. 1861–1875):
  - Consort Qi (棋妃; from November 1861), fourth rank consort
  - Noble Consort Qi (棋贵妃; from December 1874), third rank consort
- During the reign of the Guangxu Emperor (r. 1875–1908):
  - Dowager Imperial Noble Consort Qi (棋皇贵太妃; from 1908)
- During the reign of Xuantong Emperor (r. 1908–1912)
  - Imperial Noble Consort Duanke (端恪皇貴妃; from 1910)

== See also ==
- Ranks of imperial consorts in China#Qing
- Royal and noble ranks of the Qing dynasty
