= Tatara clan =

Manchu clan and family name

Manchu name
- Manchu script: ᡨᠠᡨᠠᡵᠠ

Chinese name
- Traditional Chinese: 他塔喇氏
Transcriptions
Standard Mandarin
- Hanyu Pinyin: tā tǎ lá shì

Pronunciation respelling name
- Pronunciation respelling: TAH-tah-rah

Tatara was a clan of Manchu nobility. After the demise of the dynasty, some of its descendants sinicized their clan name to the Chinese surnames Tang (唐), Tan (譚), Shu (舒) or Song (松).

== Notable figures ==
=== Males ===
- Inggūldai (英俄爾岱/英俄尔岱; 1596–1648)
- Tanbai (譚拜/谭拜; d. 1650), political figure
- Sunahai (蘇納海/苏纳海; d. 1666), minister of national history academy (Shunzi Age)
- E'ersun (额尔孙)
- Suringga (蘇凌阿/苏凌阿; d. 1799), minister of justice
- Qinghai (慶海/庆海), a sixth rank literary official (主事, pinyin: zhushi), father of Imperial Noble Consort Zhuangjing
- Yutai (裕泰), the Viceroy of Shaan-Gan in 1851
- Zhirui (志銳/志锐; 1852–1911), political figure

Prince Consort

Date	Prince Consort	Princess
	Inggūldai	Abatai's second daughter by primary consort (Nara)
	Changxu (長敘/长敘)	Mianyu's daughter

=== Females ===
Imperial Consort

- Imperial Noble Consort
  - Imperial Noble Consort Zhuangjing (1837–1890), the Xianfeng Emperor's consort, the mother of Princess Rong'an (1855–1875)
  - Imperial Noble Consort Wenjing (1873–1924), the Guangxu Emperor's consort
  - Imperial Noble Consort Keshun (1876–1900), the Guangxu Emperor's consort
  - Noble Consort Mingxian (1920–1942), Puyi's noble lady

Princess Consort

- Primary Consort
  - Yunki's first primary consort
  - Shixia (1904–1993), Pujie's first wife
- Secondary Consort
  - Yongxing's secondary consort, the mother of sixth daughter (1793–1794) and Mianbin (1796–1841)

== See also ==
- List of Manchu clans
