= Fulata =

Fulata (Manchu: ᡶᡠᠯᠠᡨᠠ Fulata; died 1694) was a Qing official of the Irgen Gioro clan and a member of the Manchu Plain Yellow Banner. He served as Viceroy of Liangjiang and later as Minister of Justice during the reign of the Kangxi Emperor.

== Biography ==
Beginning his career as a bithe-si (筆帖式, imperial secretariat clerk), Fulata held a number of scholarly and administrative posts, including Lecturer of the Hanlin Academy, directors in several ministries, and Viceroy of Liangjiang from 1688.

As Viceroy, he became known for administrative reforms, the promotion of capable officials, and vigorous anti-corruption measures. He investigated and exposed misconduct by influential officials and their relatives, earning the trust and praise of the Kangxi Emperor. He also led several high-profile corruption inquiries, resulting in the dismissal of senior provincial officials.

After his death in 1694, the Kangxi Emperor praised him as the finest Viceroy of Liangjiang since Yu Chenglong. Fulata was posthumously awarded the title of Taizi Taibao (太子太保, "Grand Protector of Crown Prince"), granted the posthumous name Qingduan (清端, “Pure and Upright”), and awarded the hereditary noble rank of baitalabure hafan. During the Yongzheng reign, he was enshrined in the Temple of Worthies (賢良祠).

His son Shuangxi (雙喜) inherited the noble title and later served as Deputy Minister of Revenue in Mukden (盛京户部侍郞).
