= Noble Consort Wen =

Consort of the Xianfeng Emperor (1835–1890)

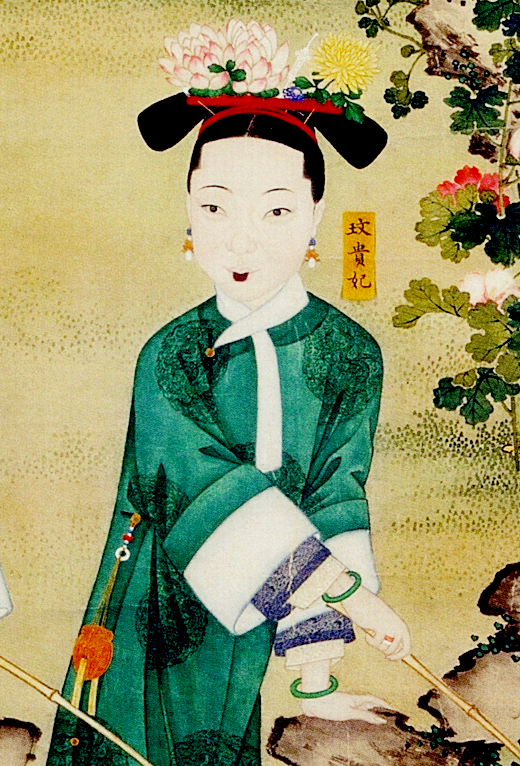
- Noble Consort Wen
- Born: 1835
- Died: 20 December 1890 (aged 54–55); Forbidden City
- Burial: Ding Mausoleum, Eastern Qing tombs
- Spouse: Xianfeng Emperor (m. 1853; died 1861)
- House: Xu (徐; by birth); Aisin Gioro (by marriage)
- Father: Chengyi (诚意)

Noble Consort Wen

Chinese name
- Traditional Chinese: 玟貴妃
- Simplified Chinese: 玟贵妃
Transcriptions
Standard Mandarin
- Hanyu Pinyin: Wén Guìfēi

Manchu name
- Manchu script: ᡤᡝᡥᡠᠩᡤᡝ ᡤᡠᠢᠢᡫᡝᡞ
- Romanization: gehungge guifei

Noble Consort Wen (simplified Chinese: 玟贵妃; traditional Chinese: 玟貴妃; pinyin: Wén Guìfēi; 1835 – 20 December 1890), of the Manchu Plain Yellow Banner Xu clan, was a consort of Xianfeng Emperor.

== Life ==
=== Family background ===
Noble Consort Wen was a Manchurian Booi Aha of the Plain Yellow Banner Xu clan, a branch of a prominent Šumuru clan.

Father: Chengyi (诚意), served as an official (Chinese: 领催; pinyin: Lǐng cuī).

=== Daoguang era ===
Noble Consort Wen was born in 1835.

=== Xianfeng era ===
Lady Xu entered the Forbidden city in 1853 and was granted a title "First Class Female Attendant Wen" (玟常在). Lady Xu was described as a beautiful and elegant woman. Thus, she was favoured by Xianfeng Emperor. In May 1854, she was promoted to "Noble Lady Wen" (玟贵人). Her residence in Forbidden City was Palace of Eternal Harmony.

In 1855, Noble Lady Wen was demoted for the first time to a "First Class Female Attendant Wen" (玟常在) from reasons unknown. In July 1855, she vented her anger on the palace maid. While the severe punishment was being performed, Lady Xu was joking with an eunuch. That incident infuriated Xianfeng Emperor so much that she was demoted to a chosen maid (官女子). The head eunuch of her residence, Sun Laifu (孙来福), was sent into slavery.

The demotion meant exclusion from the imperial harem because rank "chosen maid" was not included in the official list. Her clan was downgraded to Booi Aha (bondservants) in one month. Xianfeng Emperor restored lady Xu as "First Class Female Attendant Wen" (玟常在) on 25 July 1856, and to "Noble Lady Wen" (玟贵人) shortly after the previous promotion. Noble Lady Wen was promoted to "Concubine Wen" (玟嫔) in April 1858. On 8 January 1859, she gave birth to the second imperial prince.

=== Tongzhi era ===
In 1861, after the ascension to the throne of Tongzhi Emperor, Concubine Wen was promoted to "Consort Wen" (玟妃). In 1873, her son was posthumously honored as "Prince Min of the Second Rank" (悯郡王, "min" meaning "sympathy"). On 8 December 1874, Consort Wen was elevated to "Noble Consort Wen" (玟贵妃).

=== Guangxu era ===
Noble Consort Wen died on 20 December 1890. Her coffin was temporarily placed at Tiancun Immortal Palace and later interred in the Ding Mausoleum in the Eastern Qing tombs alongside Imperial Noble Consort Zhuangjing.

== Titles ==
- During the reign of the Daoguang Emperor (r. 1820–1850):
  - Lady Xu (from 1835)
- During the reign of the Xianfeng Emperor (r. 1850–1861):
  - First Class Female Attendant Wen (玟常在; from 1853), seventh rank consort
  - Noble Lady Wen (玟贵人; from May 1854), sixth rank consort
  - First Class Female Attendant Wen (玟常在; from 1855), seventh rank consort
  - Chosen Maid (官女子; from unknown date)
  - First Class Female Attendant Wen (玟常在; from 25 July 1856), seventh rank consort
  - Noble Lady Wen (玟贵人; from unknown date), sixth rank consort
  - Concubine Wen (玟嫔; from April 1858), fifth rank consort
- During the reign of the Tongzhi Emperor (r. 1861–1875):
  - Consort Wen (玟妃; from 1861), fourth rank consort
  - Noble Consort Wen (玟贵妃; from 8 December 1874), third rank consort

== Issue ==
- As Concubine Wen:
  - Prince Min of the Second Rank (憫郡王; 8 January 1859), second son

== See also ==
- Ranks of imperial consorts in China#Qing
- Royal and noble ranks of the Qing dynasty
