= Noble Consort Xin =

Consort of the Qiaolong Emperor (1737–1764)

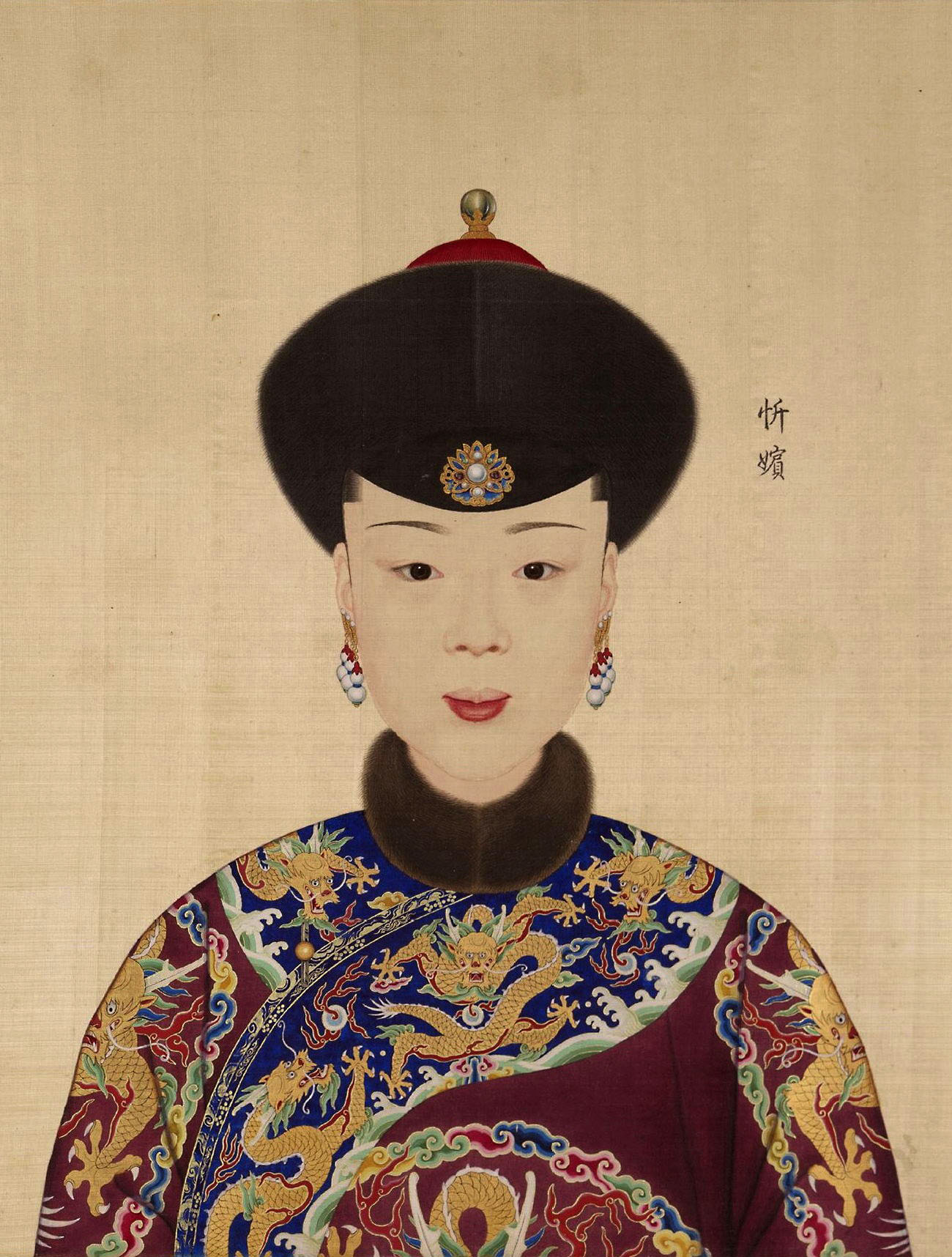
- Qing Dynasty portrait of Noble Consort Xin
- Born: 26 June 1737 (乾隆二年 五月 二十九日)
- Died: 28 May 1764 (aged 26) (乾隆二十九年 四月 二十八日); Zhongcui Palace, Forbidden City
- Burial: Yu Mausoleum, Eastern Qing tombs
- Spouse: Qianlong Emperor (before 1764)
- Issue: Sixth daughter Eighth daughter
Posthumous name
- Noble Consort Xin (忻貴妃)
- House: Daigiya (戴佳; by birth); Aisin Gioro (by marriage)
- Father: Nasutu
- Mother: Lady Janggiya

Noble Consort Xin
- Traditional Chinese: 忻貴妃
- Simplified Chinese: 忻贵妃
Transcriptions
Standard Mandarin
- Hanyu Pinyin: Xīn Guìfēi

Noble Consort Xin (26 June 1737 – 28 May 1764), of the Manchu Bordered Yellow Banner Daigiya clan, was a consort of the Qianlong Emperor. She was 26 years his junior.

== Life ==
=== Family background ===
Noble Consort Xin's personal name was not recorded in history.

- Father: Nasutu (那蘇圖; d. 1749), served as the Minister of War from 1736 to 1737, the Minister of Justice in 1737 and 1740, the Viceroy of Liangjiang from 1737 to 1739 and from 1741 to 1742 and the Viceroy of Liangguang from 1744 to 1745
  - Paternal grandfather: Daochan (道禅), served as superior censor (长史, pinyin: zhangshi)
  - Paternal great-great aunt: Consort Cheng, Kangxi Emperor's consort
- Mother: Lady Janggiya (章佳氏)
  - Maternal grandfather: Derui (德瑞)
  - Maternal great-great aunt: Imperial Noble Consort Jingmin, Kangxi Emperor's consort
- Three sisters:
  - First elder sister (b.1707): wife of deputy governor of Jiangsu You Anning (尤安宁)
  - Second elder sister: wife of fourth rank literary official Qichengge (期成额) of the Wanyan clan
  - Third elder sister: wife of the secretary of the Inner Court Fulongga (福隆阿) of the Niohuru clan.

=== Qianlong era ===
The future Noble Consort Xin was born on the 29th day of the fifth lunar month in the second year of the reign of the Qianlong Emperor, which translates to 26 June 1737 in the Gregorian calendar.

It is not known when Lady Daigiya entered the Forbidden City and became a mistress of the Qianlong Emperor. In May or June 1754, she was granted the title "Concubine Xin". She gave birth on 24 August 1755 to the emperor's sixth daughter, who would die prematurely on 27 September 1758, and on 16 January 1758 to his eighth daughter, who would die prematurely on 17 June 1767. On 16 October 1763, she was elevated to "Consort Xin".

Lady Daigiya died in childbirth on 28 May 1764 and was posthumously elevated to "Noble Consort Xin" and given a funeral befitting a Noble Consort. In 1765, she was interred in the Yu Mausoleum of the Eastern Qing tombs.

== Titles ==
- During the reign of the Qianlong Emperor (r. 1735–1796):
  - Lady Daigiya (from 26 June 1737)
  - Concubine Xin (忻嬪; from May/June 1754), fifth rank consort
  - Consort Xin (忻妃; from 16 October 1763), fourth rank consort
  - Noble Consort Xin (忻貴妃; from 22 March 1765), third rank consort

== Issue ==
- As Concubine Xin:
  - The Qianlong Emperor's sixth daughter (24 August 1755 – 27 September 1758)
  - The Qianlong Emperor's eighth daughter (16 January 1758 – 17 June 1767)
- As Consort Xin:
  - Obstructed labour or miscarriage at eight months (28 May 1764)

== See also ==
- Ranks of imperial consorts in China#Qing
- Royal and noble ranks of the Qing dynasty
