= Fuzhen =

Chinese politician (died 1908)

- Chinese: 符珍
Transcriptions
Standard Mandarin
- Hanyu Pinyin: Fúzhēn

Ruiyu
- Chinese: 瑞煜
Transcriptions
Standard Mandarin
- Hanyu Pinyin: Ruìyù

Fuzhen (符珍; died 1909), also known as Ruiyu, born of the Manchu Guwalgiya clan, was a noble of the Qing dynasty. Upon marrying the Xianfeng Emperor's daughter Gurun Princess Rong'an, he was granted the title of Prince Consort (額駙).

He was a member of the Bordered Yellow Banner of the Qing dynasty's Eight Banners, and a direct descendant of Fiongdon (費英東), who served under the Qing dynasty's founder Nurhaci. Fuzhen held the hereditary title of First Class Duke Xiongyong (一等雄勇公).
