= Xianfeng Emperor =

Emperor of China from 1850 to 1861

Xianfeng Emperor 咸豐帝
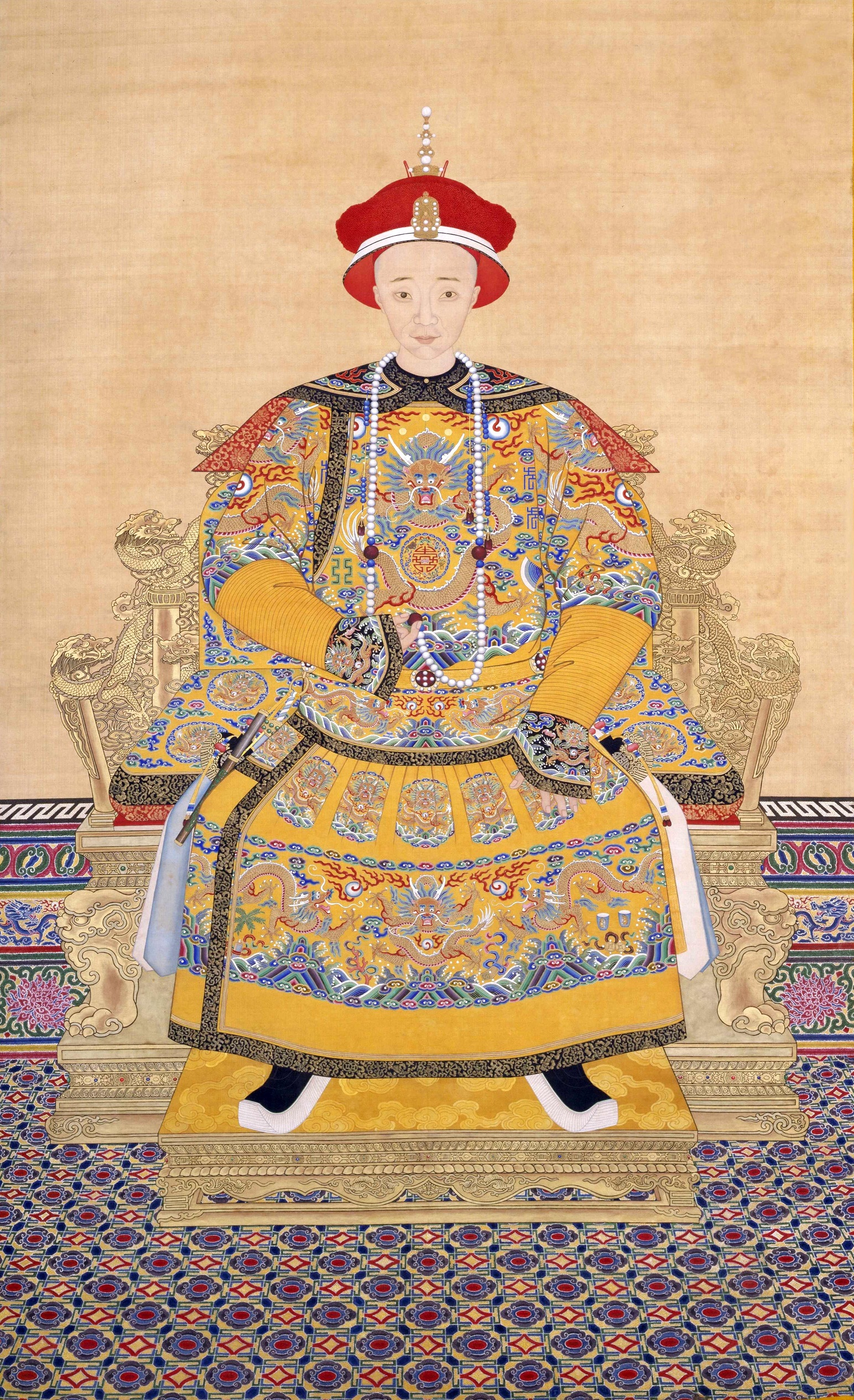
- State portrait, by anonymous court painter, currently in the collection of the Palace Museum

Emperor of the Qing dynasty
- Reign: 9 March 1850 – 22 August 1861
- Predecessor: Daoguang Emperor
- Successor: Tongzhi Emperor
- Born: 17 July 1831; Imperial Gardens (in present-day Beijing)
- Died: 22 August 1861 (aged 30); Mountain Estate (in present-day Chengde)
- Burial: Ding Mausoleum, Eastern Qing tombs
- Consorts: Empress Xiaodexian (m. 1848; died 1850) Empress Xiaozhenxian (m. 1852) Empress Xiaoqinxian (m. 1852)
- Issue Detail: Tongzhi Emperor; Princess Rong'an of the First Rank
Names
- Yizhu (奕詝); Manchu: I ju (ᡳ ᠵᡠ)
Era dates
- Xianfeng (咸豐): 1 February 1851 – 29 January 1862; Manchu: Gubci elgiyengge (ᡤᡠᠪᠴᡳ ᡝᠯᡤᡳᠶᡝᠩᡤᡝ); Mongolian: Түгээмэл Элбэгт (ᠲᠦᠭᠡᠮᠡᠯ ᠡᠯᠪᠡᠭᠲᠦ)
Posthumous name
- Emperor Xietian Yiyun Zhizhong Chuimo Maode Zhenwu Shengxiao Yuangong Duanren Kuanmin Zhuangjian Xian (協天翊運執中垂謨懋德振武聖孝淵恭端仁寬敏莊儉顯皇帝); Manchu: Abka de Aisilaha, Forgon de Wehiyehe, Dulimba be Tuwakiyaha, Bodogon be Tutabuha, Erdemu be Wesihulehe, Horon be Selgiyehe, Enduringge Hiyoošun, Mumin Gungnecuke, Tob Gosin, Onco Ulhisu Iletu Hūwangdi (ᠠᠪᡴᠠ ᡩᡝ ᠠᡳᠰᡳᠯᠠᡥᠠ᠈ ᡶᠣᡵᡤᠣᠨ ᡩᡝ ᠸᡝᡥᡳᠶᡝᡥᡝ᠈ ᡩᡠᠯᡳᠮᠪᠠ ᠪᡝ ᡨᡠᠸᠠᡴᡳᠶᠠᡥᠠ᠈ ᠪᠣᡩᠣᡤᠣᠨ ᠪᡝ ᡨᡠᡨᠠᠪᡠᡥᠠ᠈ ᡝᡵᡩᡝᠮᡠ ᠪᡝ ᠸᡝᠰᡳᡥᡠᠯᡝᡥᡝ᠈ ᡥᠣᡵᠣᠨ ᠪᡝ ᠰᡝᠯᡤᡳᠶᡝᡥᡝ᠈ ᡝᠨᡩᡠᡵᡳᠩᡤᡝ ᡥᡳᠶᠣᠣᡧᡠᠨ᠈ ᠮᡠᠮᡳᠨ ᡤᡠᠩᠨᡝᠴᡠᡴᡝ᠈ ᡨᠣᠪ ᡤᠣᠰᡳᠨ᠈ ᠣᠨᠴᠣ ᡠᠯᡥᡳᠰᡠ ᡳᠯᡝᡨᡠ ᡥᡡᠸᠠᠩᡩᡳ)
Temple name
- Wenzong (文宗); Manchu: Wendzung (ᠸᡝᠨᡯᡠᠩ)
- House: Aisin-Gioro
- Dynasty: Qing
- Father: Daoguang Emperor
- Mother: Empress Xiaoquancheng

Chinese name
- Traditional Chinese: 咸豐帝
- Simplified Chinese: 咸丰帝
Transcriptions
Standard Mandarin
- Hanyu Pinyin: Xiánfēng Dì
- Wade–Giles: Hsien^{2}-fêng^{1} Ti^{4}
- IPA: [ɕjɛ́nfə́ŋ tî]

The Xianfeng Emperor (17 July 1831 – 22 August 1861), also known by his temple name Emperor Wenzong of Qing, personal name Yizhu, was the eighth emperor of the Qing dynasty, and the seventh Qing emperor to rule over China proper. During his reign, the Qing dynasty experienced several wars and rebellions including the Taiping Rebellion, the Nian Rebellion, and the Second Opium War. He was the last Chinese emperor to exercise sole power.

The fourth son of the Daoguang Emperor, he assumed the throne in 1850 and inherited an empire in crisis. A few months after his ascension, the Taiping Rebellion broke out in southern China and rapidly spread, culminating in the fall of Nanjing in 1853. Contemporaneously, the Nian Rebellion began in the north, followed by ethnic uprisings (the Miao Rebellion and the Panthay Rebellion) in the south. The revolts ravaged large parts of the country, caused millions of deaths and would not be quelled until well into the reign of the Xianfeng Emperor's successor. Qing defeat during the first phase of the Second Opium War led to the Treaty of Tientsin and the Treaty of Aigun, the latter of which resulted in the cession of much of Manchuria to the Russian Empire. Negotiations broke down and hostilities resumed soon after, and in 1860 Anglo-French forces entered Beijing and burned the Old Summer Palace. The Xianfeng Emperor was forced to flee for the imperial estate at Jehol, and the Convention of Peking was negotiated in his absence.

His health was already in rapid decline in the face of mounting Qing losses. He died in 1861 in Jehol at the age of 30 and was succeeded by his six-year-old son, who assumed the throne as the Tongzhi Emperor. On his deathbed, the Xianfeng Emperor appointed eight men to a regency council to assist his young successor. A few months later, Empress Dowager Cixi and Empress Dowager Ci'an along with Prince Gong instigated the Xinyou Coup and ousted the regents. Cixi ultimately rose to sole power and consolidated control over the Qing government.

== Family and early life ==
Yizhu was born in 1831 at the Old Summer Palace, eight kilometres northwest of Beijing. He was from the Manchu Aisin Gioro clan, and was the fourth son of the Daoguang Emperor. His mother was the Noble Consort Quan, of the Manchu Niohuru clan, who was made Empress in 1834, and is known posthumously as Empress Xiaoquancheng. Yizhu was reputed to have an ability in literature and administration which surpassed most of his brothers, which impressed his father, who therefore decided to make him his successor.

== Early reign ==
Yizhu succeeded the throne in 1850, at age 19, and was a relatively young emperor. He inherited a dynasty that faced not only internal but also foreign challenges. Yizhu's reign title, "Xianfeng", which means "universal prosperity", did not reflect the situation. In 1850, the first of a series of popular rebellions began that would nearly destroy the Qing dynasty. The Taiping Rebellion began in December 1850, when Hong Xiuquan, a Hakka leader of a syncretic Christian sect, defeated local forces sent to disperse his followers. Hong then proclaimed the establishment of the Taiping Heavenly Kingdom and the rebellion spread to several provinces with amazing speed. The following year, the Nian Rebellion started in North China. Unlike the Christian-influenced Taiping rebels, the Nian movement lacked a clear political program, but they became a serious threat to the Qing capital, Beijing, with the mobility of their cavalry-based armies. The Qing imperial forces suffered repeated defeats at the hands of both rebel movements.

== Rebellions and wars ==
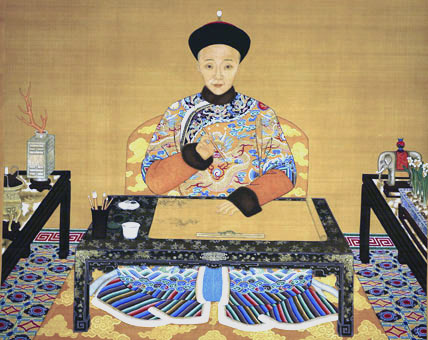
Xianfeng in court dress

In 1853, the Taiping rebels captured Nanjing and for a while it seemed that Beijing would fall next. They renamed Nanjing to Tianjing and declared it their capital. In response, the Xianfeng Emperor appointed Qing official Qishan to replace Ye Mingchen as Imperial Commissioner, and moved general Sengge Rinchen to the north to protect Beijing. Qishan sieged Nanjing and cut off supply lines to starve the city, but the ensuing Taiping Northern expedition broke through Qishan's defences and began heading for Beijing. Fortunately, it was defeated by Sengge Rinchen and the situation stabilized. The Xianfeng Emperor dispatched several prominent mandarins, such as Zeng Guofan and Sengge Rinchen, to crush the rebellions, but they only obtained limited success. The biggest revolt of the Miao people against Chinese rule in history started in 1854, and ravaged the region until finally put down in 1873. In 1856, an attempt to regain Nanjing was defeated and the Panthay Rebellion broke out in Yunnan.

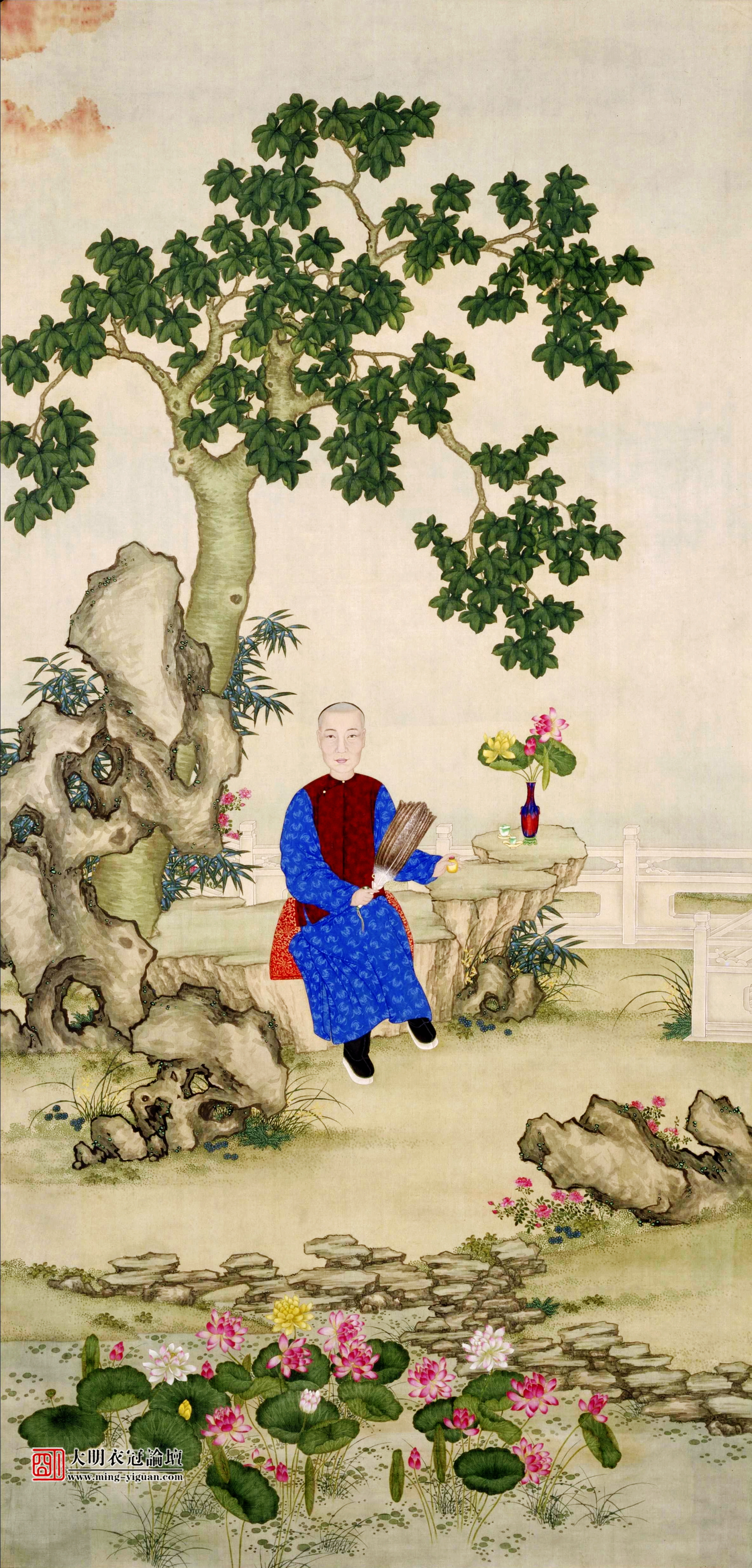
Portrait of the Xianfeng Emperor in his gardens

Meanwhile, an initially minor incident on the coasts triggered the Second Opium War. The British and French, after engaging in a number of minor military confrontations on the coast near Tianjin, attempted to start negotiations with the Qing government. The Xianfeng Emperor believed in Chinese superiority and would not agree to any demands from the European powers. He delegated Prince Gong for several negotiations but relations broke down completely when a British diplomat, Sir Harry Parkes, was taken hostage by Chinese forces during negotiations on 18 September.

Anglo-French forces clashed with Sengge Rinchen's Mongol cavalry on 18 September near Zhangjiawan before proceeding toward the outskirts of Beijing for a decisive battle in Tongzhou District, Beijing. On 21 September, at the Battle of Palikao, Sengge Rinchen's 10,000 troops, including his elite Mongol cavalrymen, were completely annihilated after several doomed frontal charges against the concentrated firepower of the Anglo-French forces, which entered Beijing on 6 October. On 18 October 1860, British and French forces sacked and burnt Old Summer Palace. Upon learning about this news, the Xianfeng Emperor's health quickly deteriorated.

During the Xianfeng Emperor's reign, China lost part of Manchuria to the Russian Empire. In 1858, according to the Treaty of Aigun, the territory between the Stanovoy Range and the Amur River was ceded to Russia, and in 1860, according to the Treaty of Beijing, the same thing happened also to the area east of the Ussuri River. After that treaty, the Russians founded the city of Vladivostok in the area they had annexed.

While negotiations with British, French and Russian officials were being held, the Xianfeng Emperor and his imperial entourage fled to Jehol province in the name of conducting the annual imperial hunting expedition. As his health worsened, the emperor's ability to govern also deteriorated, and competing ideologies in court led to the formation of two distinct factions — one led by the senior official Sushun and the princes Zaiyuan and Duanhua, and the other led by Noble Consort Yi, who was supported by the general Ronglu and the Bannermen of the Yehe Nara clan.

== Death ==
The Xianfeng Emperor died on 22 August 1861, from a short life of overindulgence, at the Chengde Mountain Resort, 230 kilometres northeast of Beijing. His successor was his surviving five-year-old son, Zaichun. A day before his death, the Xianfeng Emperor had summoned Sushun and his supporters to his bedside and gave them an imperial edict that dictated the power structure during his son's minority. The edict appointed eight men – Zaiyuan, Duanhua, Jingshou, Sushun, Muyin, Kuang Yuan, Du Han and Jiao Youying – as an eight-member regency council to aid Zaichun, who was later enthroned as the Tongzhi Emperor. The Xianfeng Emperor gave the eight men the power of regency, but their edicts would have to be endorsed by Empress Niohuru and Noble Consort Yi. Upon the Xianfeng Emperor's death, the two women became Empress Dowager Ci'an and Empress Dowager Cixi, respectively. By tradition, after the death of an emperor, the regents were to accompany his body to the capital. The empresses dowager travelled ahead to Beijing and planned a coup with Prince Gong that ousted the eight regents. Empress Dowager Cixi then effectively ruled China over the subsequent 47 years as a regent.

The Xianfeng Emperor was interred in the Eastern Qing Tombs, 125 kilometres/75 miles east of Beijing, in the Ding (定; lit. "Quietude") mausoleum complex.

== Legacy ==
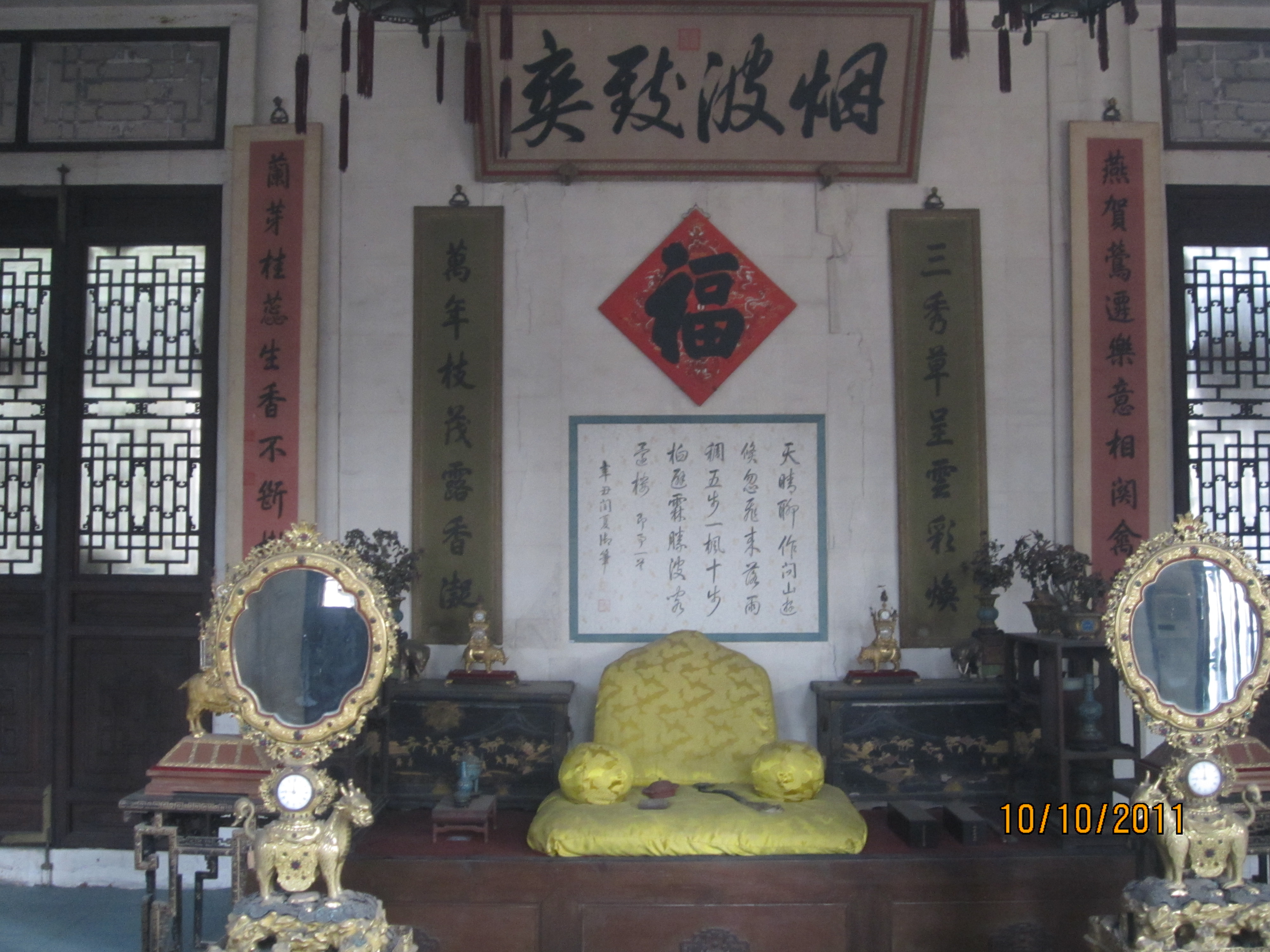
Yanbozhishuang Hall, where the Xianfeng Emperor died on 22 August 1861

The Qing dynasty continued to decline during the reign of the Xianfeng Emperor. Rebellions in the country, which began the first year of his reign, would not be quelled until well into the reign of the Tongzhi Emperor and resulted in millions of deaths. The Xianfeng Emperor also had to deal with the British and French and their ever-growing appetite to expand trade further into China. The Xianfeng Emperor, like his father, the Daoguang Emperor, understood very little about Europeans and their mindset. He viewed non-Chinese as inferior and regarded the repeated requests by the Europeans for the establishment of diplomatic relations as an offence. When the Europeans introduced the long-held concept of an exchanged consular relationship, the Xianfeng Emperor quickly rebuffed the idea. At the time of his death, he had not met with any foreign dignitary.

Despite his tumultuous decade of reign, the Xianfeng Emperor was commonly seen as the last Qing emperor to have held paramount authority, ruling in his own right. The reigns of his son and subsequent successors were overseen by regents, a trend present until the fall of the Qing dynasty.

== Family ==
- Empress Xiaodexian (孝德顯皇后), of the Sakda clan (薩克達氏; 12 April 1831 – 24 January 1850)
- Empress Xiaozhenxian (孝貞顯皇后), of the Niohuru clan (鈕祜祿氏; 12 August 1837 – 8 April 1881)
- Empress Xiaoqinxian (孝欽顯皇后), of the Yehe Nara clan (葉赫那拉氏; 29 November 1835 – 15 November 1908)
  - Zaichun (載淳), the Tongzhi Emperor (同治帝; 27 April 1856 – 12 January 1875), first son
- Imperial Noble Consort Zhuangjing (莊靜皇貴妃), of the Tatara clan (他他拉氏; 2 April 1837 – 26 December 1890)
  - Princess Rong'an of the First Rank (榮安固倫公主; 20 June 1855 – 5 February 1875), first daughter
    - Married Fuzhen (符珍; d. 1909), of the Gūwalgiya clan, in September/October 1873
- Imperial Noble Consort Duanke (端恪皇貴妃), of the Tunggiya clan (佟佳氏; 3 December 1844 – 7 May 1910)
- Noble Consort Wen (玟貴妃), of the Xu clan (徐氏; 1835 – 20 December 1890)
  - Prince Min of the Second Rank (憫郡王; b. 8 January 1859), second son
- Noble Consort Wan (婉貴妃), of the Socoro clan (索綽絡氏; 17 November 1835 – 20 June 1894)
- Consort Lu (璷妃), of the Yehe Nara clan (葉赫那拉氏; 2 March 1841 – 15 May 1895), personal name Mudanchun (牡丹春)
- Consort Ji (吉妃), of the Wang clan (王氏; 1846 – 12 November 1905), personal name Xinghuachun (杏花春)
- Consort Xi (禧妃), of the Cahala clan (察哈喇氏; 4 October 1842 – 26 June 1877), personal name Haitangchun (海棠春)
- Consort Qing (慶妃), of the Zhang clan (張氏; 25 October 1840 – 15 June 1885), personal name Wulingchun (武陵春)
- Concubine Yun (雲嬪), of the Wugiya clan (武佳氏; d. 11 January 1856), personal name Qiyun (绮云)
- Concubine Rong (容嬪), of the Irgen Gioro clan (伊爾根覺羅氏; 6 July 1837 – 21 June 1869)
- Concubine Shu (璹嬪), of the Yehe Nara clan (葉赫那拉氏; 27 March 1840 – 9 May 1874)
- Concubine Yu (玉嬪), of the Yehe Nara clan (葉赫那拉氏; 14 August 1843 – 26 December 1863)
- First Class Attendant Chun (瑃常在), of the Ming'an clan (暝谙氏; 1835–1859)
- First Class Attendant Xin (鑫常在), of the Daigiya clan (戴佳氏; d. 27 May 1859)
- First Class Attendant Ping (玶常在), of the Irgen Gioro clan (伊尔根觉罗氏; d. 1856)

== See also ==
- Family tree of Chinese monarchs (late)
- Second Opium War (1856–1860)
- Treaties of Tianjin (1858)
- Convention of Peking (1860)

Xianfeng Emperor House of Aisin Gioro Born: 17 July 1831 Died: 22 August 1861
Regnal titles
Preceded by Daoguang Emperor	Emperor of the Qing dynasty Emperor of China; 1850–1861	Succeeded by Tongzhi Emperor
