= Consort Xi =

Consort of Xianfeng Emperor

- Born: 4 October 1842
- Died: 26 June 1877 (aged 34); Forbidden City
- Burial: Ding Mausoleum, Western Qing tombs
- Spouse: Xianfeng Emperor (m. 1855; died 1861)
- House: Cahala (察哈喇; by birth); Aisin Gioro (by marriage)
- Father: Changshun

Consort Xi
- Traditional Chinese: 禧妃
- Simplified Chinese: 禧妃
Transcriptions
Standard Mandarin
- Hanyu Pinyin: Xī Fēi

Consort Xi (Chinese: 禧妃; pinyin: Xī Fēi; 4 October 1842 – 26 June 1877), of the Manchu Plain Yellow Banner Cahala clan, was a consort of Xianfeng Emperor.

== Life ==
=== Family background ===
Consort Xi was a booi aha of Manchu Plain Yellow Banner Cahala clan.

Father: Changshun, a cook in the Ministry of Internal Affairs (厨师).

=== Daoguang era ===
Consort Xi was born on 4 October 1842.

=== Xianfeng era ===
Haitangchun was one of the palace maids of Empress Dowager Cixi living in Changchun palace in the Forbidden City. In 1855, she was promoted to “Noble Lady Xi" (禧贵人，'xi' meaning "auspicious"). She formed a clique called "Four Spring Ladies" (四春娘娘) together with Noble Lady Lu, Noble Lady Ji and Noble Lady Qing. The name of the group corresponded personal names of ladies containing character "chun" (spring). In 1861, she was promoted to "Concubine Xi", but the promotion ceremony was held during Tongzhi era.

=== Tongzhi era ===
In 1874, lady Cahala was promoted to "Consort Xi".

=== Guangxu era ===
Cahala Haitangchun died on 26 June 1877. She was interred at the Ding Mausoleum in the Eastern Qing tombs.

== Titles ==
- During the reign of the Daoguang Emperor (r. 1820–1850):
  - Lady Cahala (from 4 October 1842)
- During the reign of the Xianfeng Emperor (r. 1850–1861):
  - Noble Lady Xi (禧贵人; from 1855), sixth rank consort
  - Concubine Xi (禧嫔; from 1861), fifth rank consort
- During the reign of the Tongzhi Emperor (r. 1861–1875):
  - Consort Xi (禧妃; from 1874), fourth rank consort

== See also ==
- Ranks of imperial consorts in China#Qing
- Royal and noble ranks of the Qing dynasty
