= Consort Lu (Xianfeng) =

Imperial consort of the Xianfeng Emperor (1841–1895)

- Born: 2 March 1841
- Died: 15 May 1895 (aged 54); Forbidden City
- Burial: Ding Mausoleum, Western Qing tombs
- Spouse: Xianfeng Emperor (m. 1855; died 1861)
- House: Yehe-Nara (葉赫那拉氏; by birth); Aisin-Gioro (by marriage)
- Father: Quanwen

Consort Lu
- Traditional Chinese: 璷妃
- Simplified Chinese: 璷妃
Transcriptions
Standard Mandarin
- Hanyu Pinyin: Lú Fēi

Consort Lu (Chinese: 璷妃; pinyin: Lú Fēi; 2 March 1841 – 15 May 1895), of the Manchu Yehe-Nara clan belonging to the Plain White Banner, was a consort of the Xianfeng Emperor.

== Life ==
=== Family background ===
- Father: Quanwen (全文), served as sixth rank literary official (主事).

=== Daoguang era ===
The future Consort Lu was born on 2 March 1841.

=== Xianfeng era ===
Lady Yehe-Nara entered Forbidden City in 1855, and was given the title "Noble Lady Lu" (璷贵人; "lu" meaning "exquisite"). She remained childless during the Xianfeng era and lived in Chuxiu Palace together with the future Empress Dowager Cixi. She was member of a clique called "Four Spring Ladies" (四春娘娘) together with Noble Lady Xi, Noble Lady Ji, and Noble Lady Qing.

=== Tongzhi era ===
In 1861, Noble Lady Lu was promoted to "Dowager Concubine Lu" (璷太嫔) according to imperial tradition. In 1874, she was elevated to "Dowager Consort Lu" (璷太妃).

=== Guangxu era ===
On 2 March 1891, Lady Yehe-Nara celebrated her 50th birthday (千秋; one thousand autumns). Consort Lu received five rolls of lotus root xiaojuan silk thread, five rolls of white moon xiaojuan silk thread, five rolls of grey xiaojuan silk and satin, five rolls of golden yellow xiaojuan silk and satin, five rolls of blue crepe and jiang soy sauce (brown) gauze. She was supposed to be promoted to the rank of dowager noble consort (貴太妃), but died from illness on 15 May 1895.

== Titles ==
- During the reign of the Daoguang Emperor (r. 1820–1850):
  - Lady Yehe-Nara (葉赫那拉氏)
- During the reign of the Xianfeng Emperor (r. 1850–1861):
  - Noble Lady Lu (璷贵人; from 1855), sixth rank imperial consort
- During the reign of the Tongzhi Emperor (r. 1861–1875):
  - Dowager Concubine Lu (璷太嫔; from 1861)
  - Dowager Consort Lu (璷太妃; from 1874)

== See also ==
- Imperial Chinese harem system#Qing
- Royal and noble ranks of the Qing dynasty
