= Irgen Gioro =

Manchu clan and family name

Irgen Gioro ᡳᡵᡤᡝᠨ ᡤᡳᠣᡵᠣ
- Clan and Family name
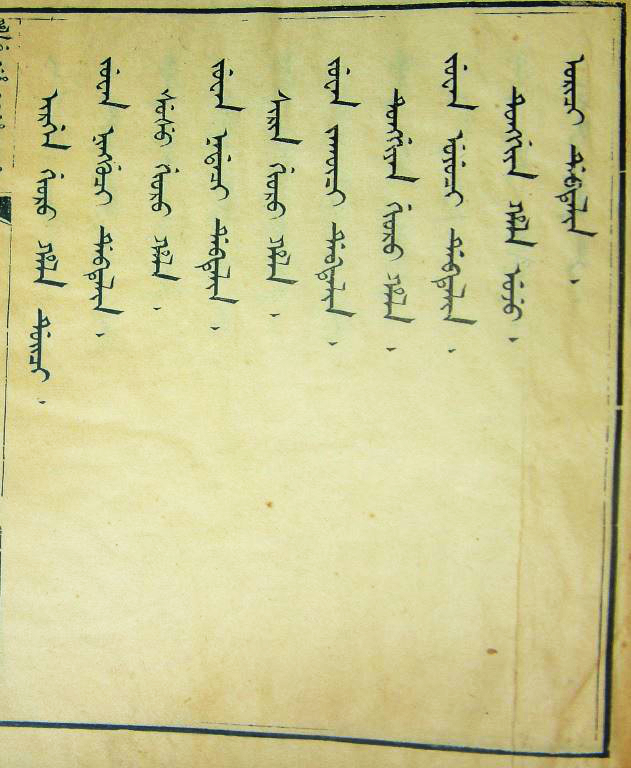
- Irgen Gioro (first two words on the left) in the Complete Genealogies of the Clans and Families of the Manchu Eight Banners
- Place of origin: Manchuria
- Founder: Various
- Connected members: See Notable figures
- Cadet branches: Donggo etc.

Irgen Gioro

Manchu name
- Manchu script: ᡳᡵᡤᡝᠨ ᡤᡳᠣᡵᠣ
- Möllendorff: irgen gioro

Chinese name
- Chinese: 伊尔根觉罗氏
Transcriptions
Standard Mandarin
- Hanyu Pinyin: yī ěr gēn jué luó shì

Pronunciation respelling name
- Pronunciation respelling: Eer-gən Ghee-ore-oh

Irgen Gioro is a Manchu clan, family name, and major component of the Gioro clan, which was officially categorized as a "prominent family" (著姓), and one of the eight great houses of the Manchu nobility in Qing dynasty. Sibe and Nanai people also have Irgen Gioro as one of their family names.

== Overview ==
The origin of Irgen Gioro does not have a decisive conclusion. A shared anecdote across Gioro clan stated that the ancestors of Irgen Gioro were allegedly the captive emperors Huizong and Qinzong and later assimilated by the Jurchens. The Manchu emperors had also bestowed their family name to the founding ministers or generals who rendered outstanding service to the empire. In order to differentiate from Aisin Gioro the Manchu imperial family, Irgen was added as a prefixed clan name with the implication of "regular tribesmen" or "non-imperial clansmen".

At the early period of Manchu Empire, Irgen Gioro were recorded as 340 households. They mainly distributed in Muki, Yehe, Giyamuhu, Hingkan, Sarhū, Hunehe, Yarhū, Girin Ula, Sunggari Ula, Akūli, Fe Ala, Hada, and various other areas across Manchuria. The whole clan had many famous hereditary noblemen in the empire, prime examples are Viscounts Asan and Arjin of Muki; Viscount Turusi and Baron Fiyangū of Yehe. Among these noble Irgen Gioro families, Muki family (also known as Muki Gioro) was particularly considered as the most politically influential one because of their important contribution to the Manchu Empire's founding. Irgen Gioro also earned numerous titles of minor nobility and 40 hereditary peers as nirui janggin in Banner Armies.

There were few instance of name change of the clan (e.g. The Manchu clan of Bayara, Donggo, Laibu, Monggero, and Siburu came from the Irgen Gioro who settled in these places.) at the early Qing Dynasty because of migration. Due to the adoption of Chinese culture during the mid to late Qing dynasty, most of Irgen Gioro chose Zhao (Chinese: 趙；Manchu: ᠵᠣᡠ, Möllendorff: Joo), the first surname in the famous Hundred Family Surnames, as their Sino family name. It was according to the Mandarin homophone of Gioro and the anecdotal House of Zhao origin. Other utilization of Sino family names, such as Tong, Gu, Yi, Sa (薩), Gong, Zhao (兆), Cao, Bao, Zhe (哲), Xi, Yu, Ge, Ma, Gao, Hu, Bai, and Chen, are also reported.

== Genealogy Research ==
Due to the variety of its origins, C-TYT61432,C-M504, and O-CTS723 have been reported as Irgen Gioro's Y-chromosome DNA haplogroups in modern research samples, which are not closely associated with the most likely candidate haplogroup of the House of Zhao (Q-MF10603). In fact, the current Irgen Gioro samples, for example C-F3830, an upper-clade of C-TYT61432, is typically Northeast Asia originated and considered as a haplogroup which made important genetic contributions to modern Mongolic- and Manchu-Tungusic speaking populations by molecular anthropologists.

== Notable figures ==
=== Others ===
==== Prince consort ====
| Name | Family Origin | Notes |
|---|---|---|
| Gahašan Hashū | Giyamuhu | Married Nurhaci's full sister |
| Kūwaja | Muki | Married Hong Taiji's sixth daughter |
| Fusengge | Warka | Married Hereditary Prince Yinxiang's second daughter |

==== Noble ladies ====
===== Imperial consorts & concubines =====
| Name | Family Origin | Notes |
|---|---|---|
| Lady Irgen Gioro | Hunehe | Nurhaci's secondary consort, Prince Abatai's mother |
| Lady Irgen Gioro | | Nurhaci's concubine |
| Lady Irgen Gioro | Muki(?) | Hongtaiji's concubine, Imperial Duke Cangšu's mother |
| Noble Consort Xun | Akūli | the Qianlong Emperor's noble consort; Viceroy Henian's daughter |
| Concubine Rong | | the Xianfeng Emperor's noble lady |
| First Class Attendant Ping | Warka | the Xianfeng Emperor's first class female attendant |

===== Princess consorts & concubines =====
| Name | Family Origin | Notes |
|---|---|---|
| Lady Irgen Gioro | | Prince Yunzhi's first primary consort |
| Lady Irgen Gioro | Neyen | Prince Yunhu's first primary consort, Prince Honglong's mother; Grand Secretary Fulata's granddaughter |
| Lady Irgen Gioro | Warka | Prince Yongcheng's step primary consort; Prince Consort Fusengge's daughter |
| Lady Irgen Gioro | | Prince Yunti's secondary consort |
| Lady Irgen Gioro | | Prince Yonghuang's secondary consort, Prince Mian'en's mother |
| Lady Irgen Gioro | | Prince Hooge's concubine |
| Lady Irgen Gioro | | Prince Yunzhi's concubine |
| Lady Irgen Gioro | | Prince Yunyou's concubine |
| Lady Irgen Gioro | | Prince Yunti's concubine |

==== Modern ====
| Name | Family Origin | Notes |
|---|---|---|
| Chang Shuhong | | the founder and head of Dunhuang Research Academy |
| Zhao Ermi | Ningguta | Herpetologist and a member of the Chinese Academy of Sciences |

==== Gallery ====
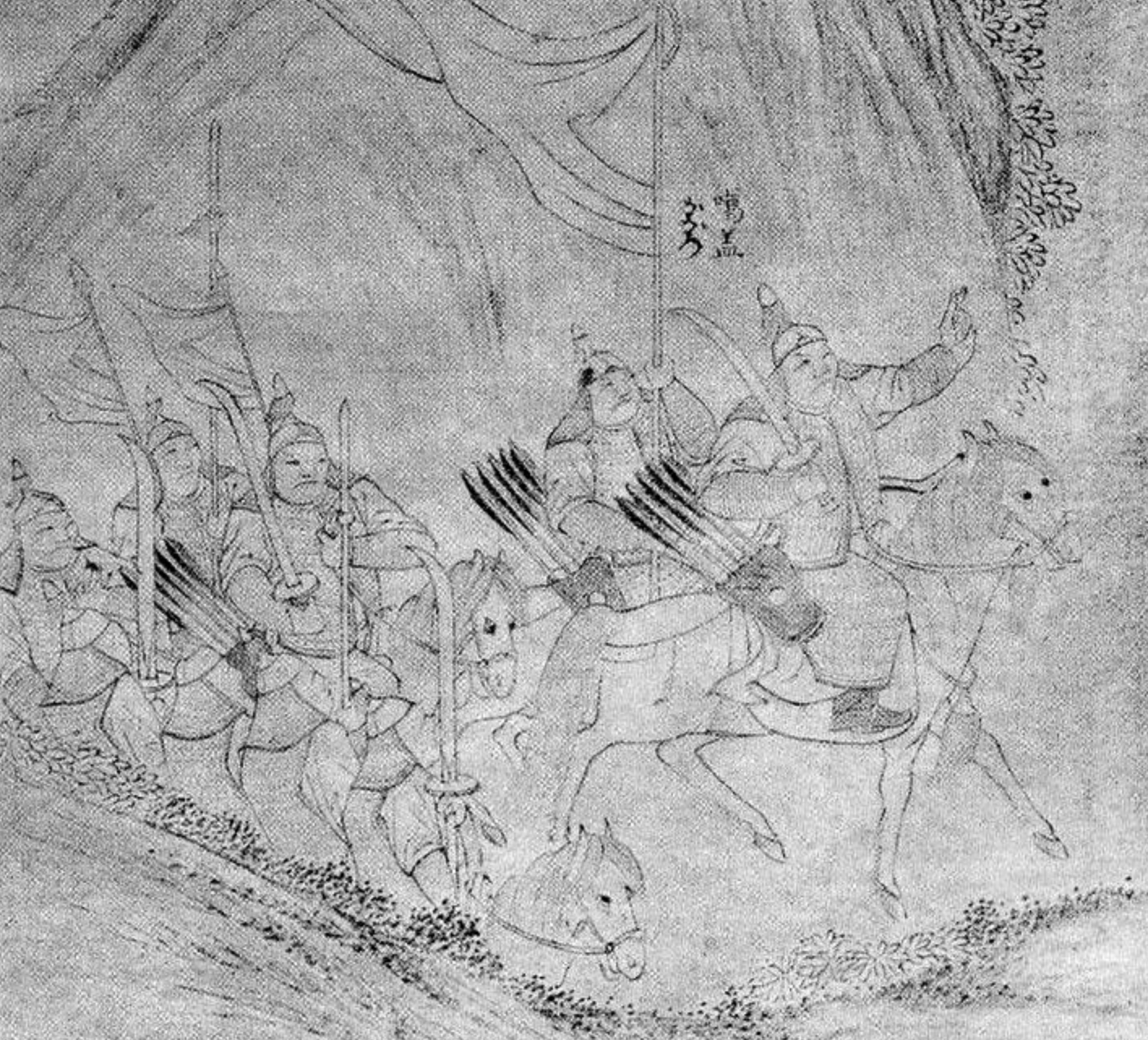
Manchu Veritable Record (滿洲實錄) depicted G'ag'ai Jargūci leading Jianzhou Jurchen forces as one of the three commanders in the Battle of Fodoho mountain fortress of Neyen tribe

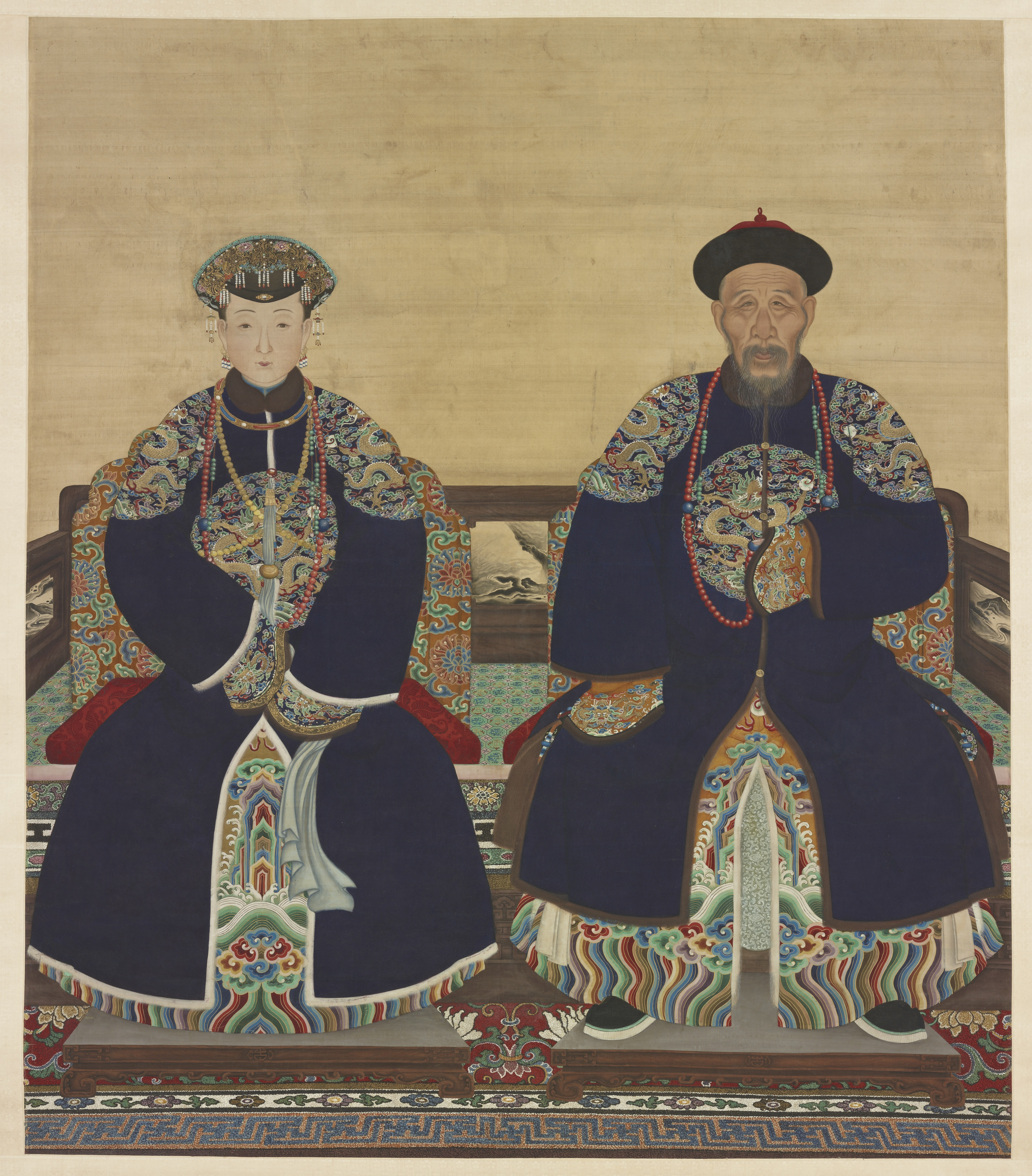
Princess consort Irgen Gioro with her husband Yinti, Prince Xun, son of Kangxi emperor

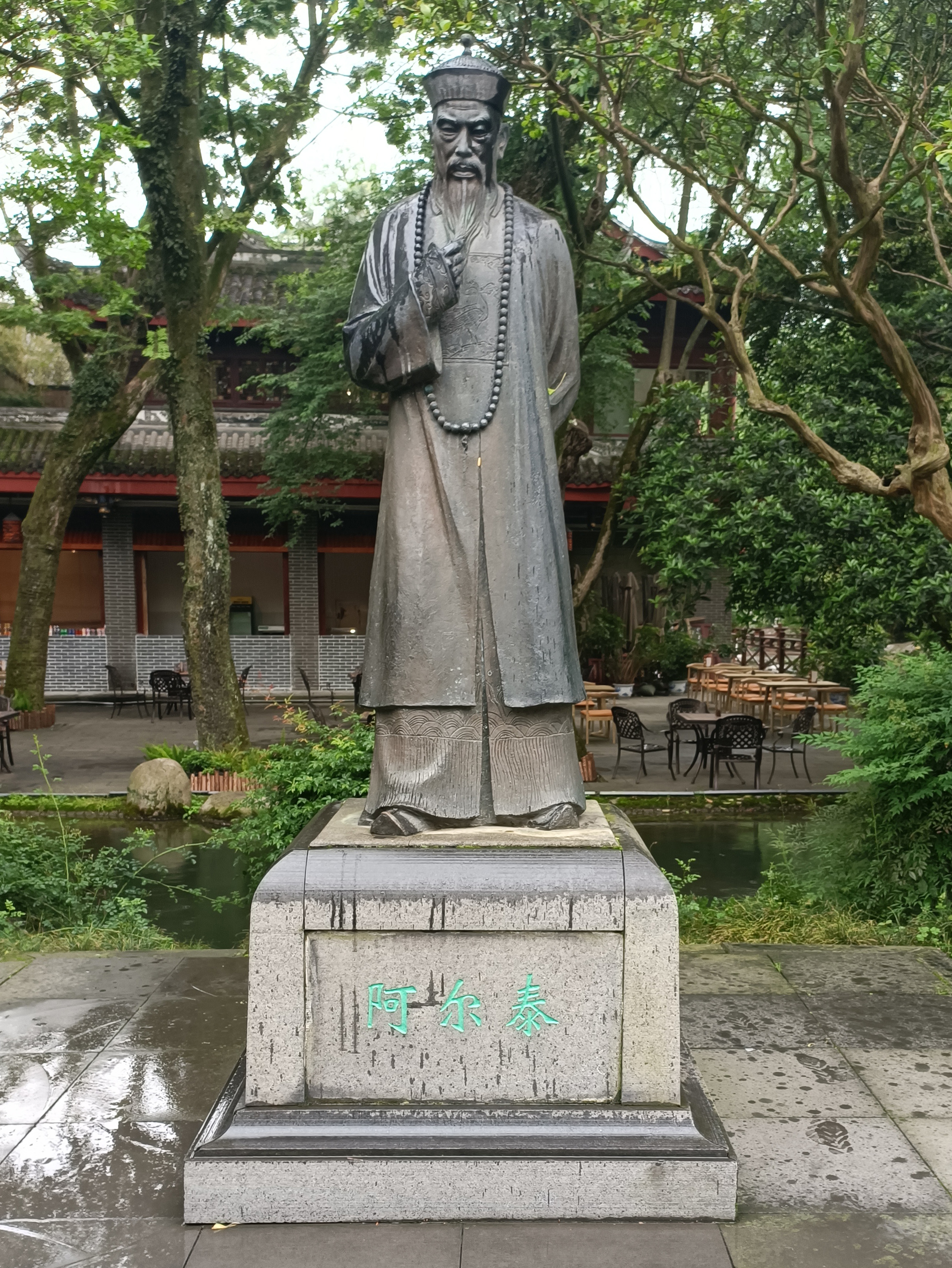
A statue of Artai, Viceroy of Sichuan during Qianlong reign, for commemorating his contributions to water conservancy

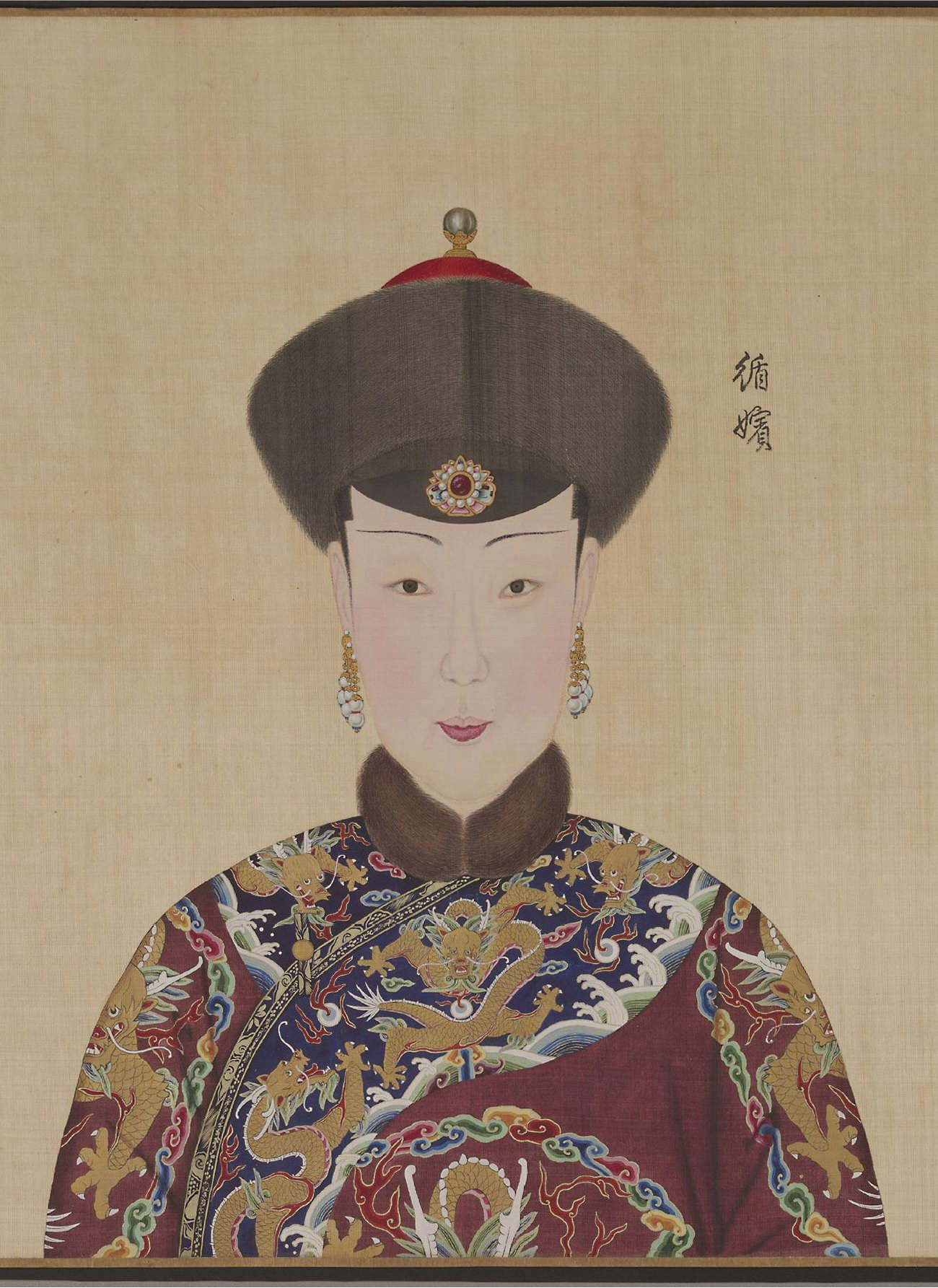
Noble Consort Xun of Akūli

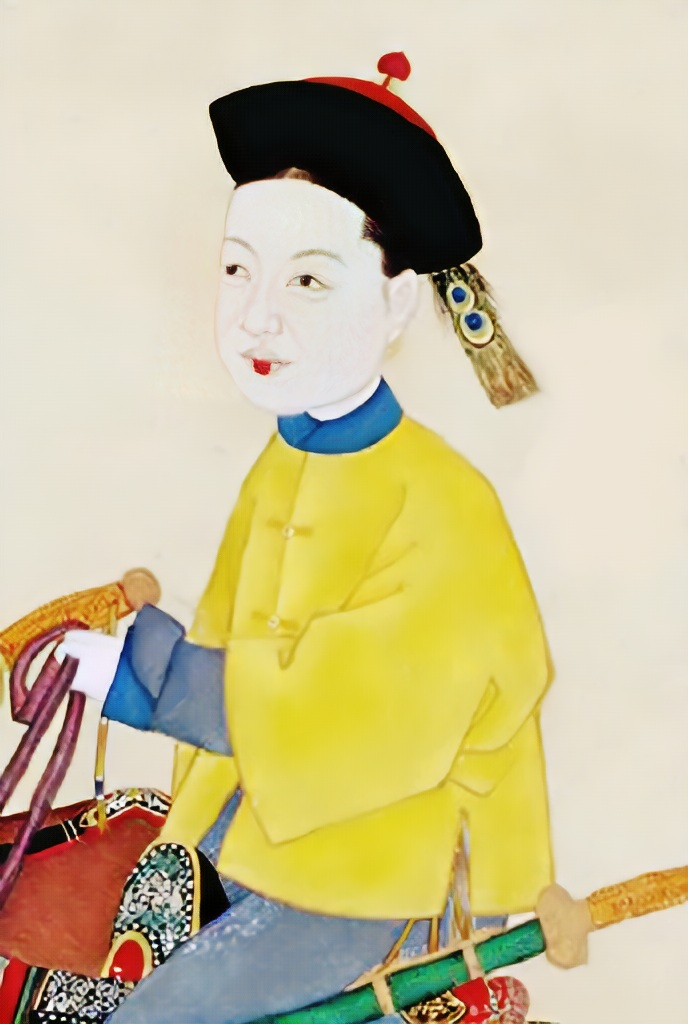
First Class Attendant Ping of Warka

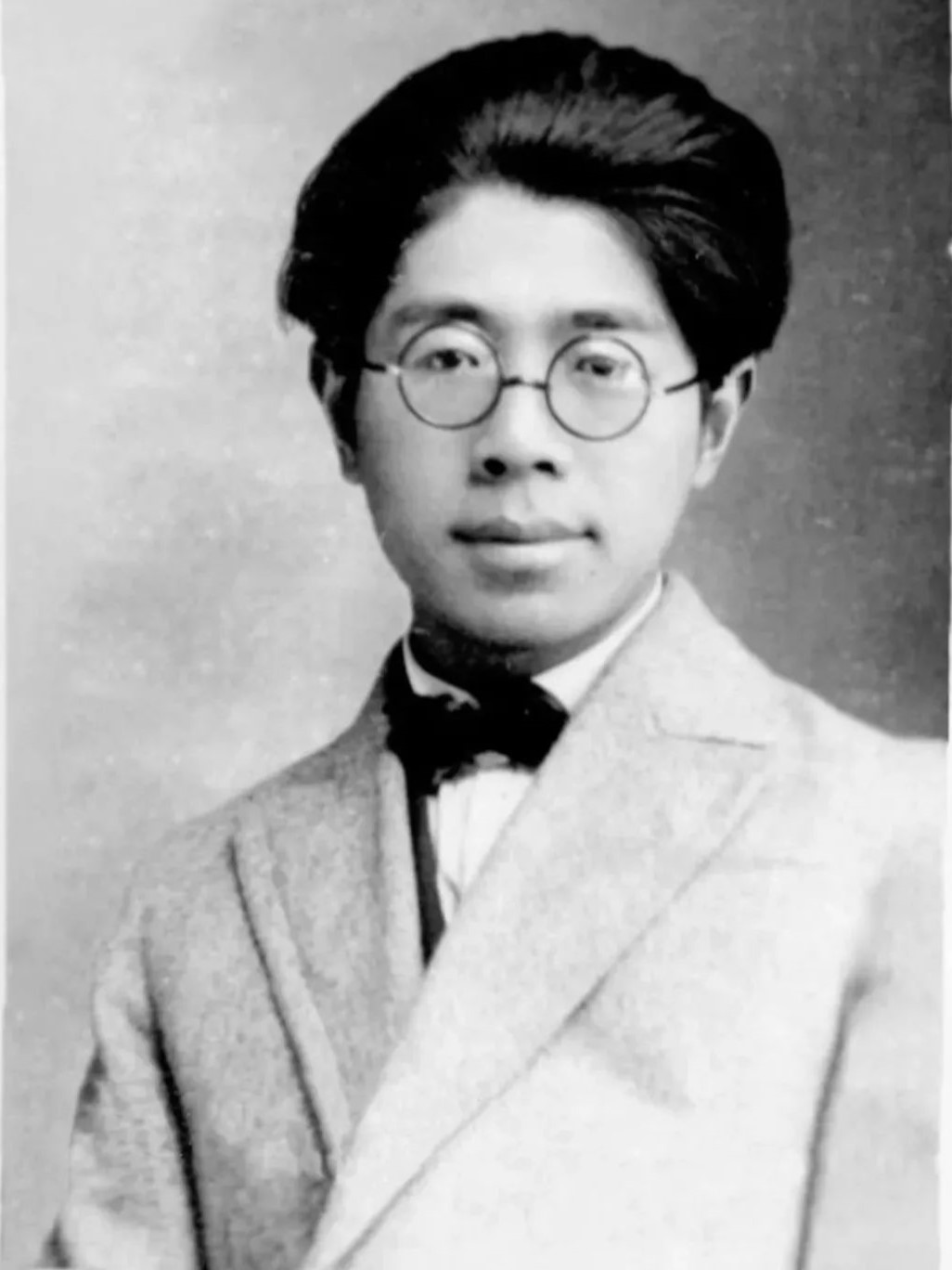
Chang Shuhong, the founder of Dunhuang Research Academy

== See also ==
- Gioro clan
- Manchu people
- Manchu name
- List of Manchu clans
