= Princess Rong'an =

Qing princess (1855–1875)

Gurun Princess Rong'an
- Born: 20 June 1855
- Died: 5 February 1875 (aged 19)
- Spouse: Gūwalgiya Fuzhen, Duke of Xiongyong
- House: Aisin Gioro (by birth); Gūwalgiya (by marriage)
- Father: Xianfeng Emperor
- Mother: Imperial Noble Consort Zhuangjing

Princess Rong'an
- Traditional Chinese: 榮安固倫公主
- Simplified Chinese: 荣安固伦公主
Transcriptions
Standard Mandarin
- Hanyu Pinyin: Róng'ān Gùlún Gōngzhǔ

Gurun Princess Rong'an (20 June 1855 – 5 February 1875) was a princess of the Qing Dynasty, and the only daughter of the Xianfeng Emperor and his Consort Li. She was born in the fourth year of the reign of the Xianfeng Emperor. She married Fuzhen of the Gūwalgiya clan in August 1873, on the order of Empress Dowager Cixi in accordance with Manchu imperial customs. She was pregnant when she heard news of the death of her half-brother, the Tongzhi Emperor. The emotional stress caused her to suffer a miscarriage. She died a month later at the age of 19 without any children.
