= Socoro =

Manchu clan and family name

Manchu name
- Manchu script: ᠰᠣᠴᠣᡵᠣ

Chinese name
- Chinese: 索绰罗
Transcriptions
Standard Mandarin
- Hanyu Pinyin: suǒ chuò luó shì

Pronunciation respelling name
- Pronunciation respelling: SOH-choh-roh

Socoro is a Manchu clan and surname in China. Socoro clan is a branch of Hešeri clan. The surname Suo (索), Cao (曹) and Shi (石) have been used for short for generations.

== Notable figures ==
=== Females ===
Imperial Consort

- Noble Consort
  - Zhaoge (招格), Noble Consort Wan (1835–1894), the Xianfeng Emperor's imperial concubine
- Noble Lady
  - Noble Lady Rui (d. 1765), the Qianlong Emperor's noble lady

Princess Consort

- Secondary Consort
  - Yongqi's secondary consort, the mother of first son (1759), third son (1762–1763), fourth son (1764) and Mianyi (1764–1815)

== See also ==
- List of Manchu clans
