= Concubine Yun (Xianfeng) =

Consort of Xianfeng Emperor (died 1856)

Consort Yun
- Born: Qiyun (绮云)
- Died: 11 January 1856; Forbidden City
- Burial: Ding Mausoleum, Western Qing tombs
- Spouse: Xianfeng Emperor (m. 1849)
- House: Wugiya (武佳; by birth); Aisin Gioro (by marriage)
- Father: Wude (五德)

Concubine Yun
- Traditional Chinese: 雲嬪
- Simplified Chinese: 雲嬪
Transcriptions
Standard Mandarin
- Hanyu Pinyin: Yún Pín

Concubine Yun (Chinese: 雲嬪; pinyin: Yún Pín; died 11 January 1856), from the Han Chinese Bordered Yellow Banner Wugiya clan, was a consort of Xianfeng Emperor.

== Life ==
=== Family background ===
Concubine Yun was a Han Chinese Booi Aha of the Bordered Yellow Banner Wugiya clan. Her personal name was Qiyun (绮云; meaning "impressive clouds"). Her ancestors initially were manufacturers.

- Father: Wude (五德), served as an official (领催)

=== Daoguang era ===
The date of birth of the future Concubine Yun is unknown. In 1849, Lady Wugiya was promoted from a maidservant of the fourth prince Yizhu to a mistress (庶福晋). Her father became an official in the Ministry of Internal Affairs.

=== Xianfeng era ===
In 1852, Lady Wugiya was granted the title of "Noble Lady Yun". Another elegant women, Lady Socoro was granted a title of First Attendant despite her illustrious family background. Noble Lady Yun lived under supervision of Concubine Zhen in the Palace of Accumulated Essence (钟粹宫). In April 1852, Lady Wugiya received a gift from Dowager Concubine Tong. In May 1852, Noble Lady Yun was promoted to "Concubine Yun", and moved to Chengqian palace. She supervised Noble Lady Wan there. In July 1852, court artisans painted her portrait in the Ruyi pavilion of Old Summer Palace. Lady Wugiya died on 11 January 1856. Her coffin was interred at the Ding Mausouleum of the Eastern Qing tombs in 1864, fourth year of Tongzhi era.

== Titles ==
- During the reign of the Daoguang Emperor (r. 1820–1850):
  - Lady Wugiya (from unknown date)
  - Servant (from unknown date)
  - Mistress (格格; from 1849)
- During the reign of the Xianfeng Emperor (r. 1850–1861):
  - Noble Lady Yun 雲貴人; from 1852)
  - Concubine Yun (雲嬪; from May 1852)

== See also ==
- Ranks of imperial consorts in China#Qing
- Royal and noble ranks of the Qing dynasty
