= Consort Ji (Xianfeng) =

Consort of the Xianfeng Emperor (Died 1861)

- Born: 1846
- Died: 12 November 1905 (aged 58–59); Forbidden City
- Burial: Ding Mausoleum, Western Qing tombs
- Spouse: Xianfeng Emperor (m. 1858; died 1861)
- House: Wang (王; by birth); Aisin Gioro (by marriage)
- Father: Qingyuan (清远)
- Mother: Lady Wu (伍氏)

Consort Ji
- Traditional Chinese: 吉妃
- Simplified Chinese: 吉妃
Transcriptions
Standard Mandarin
- Hanyu Pinyin: Jí Fēi

Consort Ji (Chinese: 吉妃; pinyin: Jí Fēi; 1846 – 12 November 1905), of the Han Chinese Plain Yellow Banner Wang clan, was a consort of the Xianfeng Emperor.

== Life ==
=== Family background ===
Consort Ji was a member of Han Chinese Plain Yellow Banner Wang clan.

Father: Qingyuan (清远), served as a guard in imperial gardens department.

Mother: Lady Wu (伍氏)

One brother:Wenyuan (文元)

=== Daoguang era ===
Consort Ji was born in 1846. Her father and grandfather died, leaving her together with mother, lady Wu, who received only one tael monthly.

=== Xianfeng era ===
In 1858, Lady Wang entered the Forbidden City, and was given the title of "Noble Lady Ji" (吉贵人; "ji" meaning "auspicious"). She lived under the supervision of Empress Xiaozhenxian in Zhongcui palace. Lady Wang joined a clique called "Four spring ladies" (Chinese: 四春娘娘; pinyin: Sì chūn niángniáng) together with Noble Lady Lu, Noble Lady Xi and Noble Lady Qing. According to the "Early years of Cixi" lady Wang and Consort Yi were holding crippled Xianfeng Emperor. Once, when Noble Lady Ji was pregnant, she was walking together with Lady Yehe Nara in Imperial Garden. Lady Nara accidentally kicked lady Wang causing her a miscarriage.

=== Tongzhi era ===
In 1861, Noble Lady Ji was promoted to "Concubine Ji" (吉嫔) together with other Four Spring ladies.

=== Guangxu era ===
In 1875, Concubine Ji was promoted to "Consort Ji" (吉妃). Consort Ji died on 12 November 1905. She was interred at the Ding Mausoleum in Eastern Qing tombs in 1907.

== Titles ==
- During the reign of the Daoguang Emperor (r. 1820–1850):
  - Lady Wang (from 1846)
- During the reign of the Xianfeng Emperor (r. 1850–1861):
  - Noble Lady Ji (吉贵人; from 1858), sixth rank consort
- During the reign of the Tongzhi Emperor (r. 1861–1875):
  - Concubine Ji (吉嫔; from 1861), fifth rank consort
- During the reign of the Guangxu Emperor (r. 1875–1908):
  - Consort Ji (吉妃; from 1875), fourth rank consort

== Issue ==
- As Noble Lady:
  - Miscarriage (male; 1859 or 1860)

== See also ==
- Ranks of imperial consorts in China#Qing
- Royal and noble ranks of the Qing dynasty
