= Noble Consort Wan (Xianfeng) =

- Born: 17 November 1835
- Died: 20 June 1894 (aged 58); Forbidden City
- Burial: Ding Mausoleum, Eastern Qing tombs
- Spouse: Xianfeng Emperor (m. 1858; died 1861)
- House: Socoro (索绰罗; by birth); Aisin Gioro (by marriage)
- Father: Kuizhao (奎照)

Noble Consort Wan
- Traditional Chinese: 婉貴妃
- Simplified Chinese: 婉贵妃
Transcriptions
Standard Mandarin
- Hanyu Pinyin: Wǎn Guìfēi

Noble Consort Wan (simplified Chinese: 婉贵妃; traditional Chinese: 婉貴妃; pinyin: Wǎn Guìfēi; 17 November 1835 – 20 June 1894), of the Manchu Plain White Banner Socoro clan, was a consort of Xianfeng Emperor.

== Life ==
=== Family background ===
Noble Consort Wan was a member of Manchu Plain White Banner Socoro clan. Her personal name was Zhaoge (招格)

Father: Kuizhao (奎照), served as a member of Grand Council in 1814 and first rank literary official (Chinese: 左都御史; pinyin: Zuǒ dōu yù shǐ) in 1842.

- Paternal grandfather: Yinghe (英和), a tutor of Crown Prince in 1793, a member of Grand Council and a secretary in the Ministry of Revenue.
- Paternal grandmother：Lady Sakda
- Paternal great aunt: Noble Lady Rui (瑞贵人)

One sister: a wife of supporter general Zaikun (辅国将军 载坤)

One elder brother: Xizhi (锡祉), an official (官员)

=== Daoguang era ===
Noble Consort Wan was born on 17 November 1835.

=== Xianfeng era ===
Lady Socoro entered the Forbidden city in 1851, and was given the title of "First class female attendant Wan" (婉常在; "wan" meaning "tactfull"). There was discussion in imperial court to bestow her a title "Noble Lady". Xianfeng Emperor cut on discussion assuming that lady Socoro didn't deserve a title "Noble Lady" in spite of her noble and illustrious family background. Instead, the emperor gave a title "Noble Lady" to Ugiya Qiyun, his former mistress. Lady Socoro lived in Chengqian palace under the supervision of Concubine Yun. In June 1852, she travelled to Yuanmingyuan with her servants. At that time, court painters were ordered to create portraits of imperial concubines. Her portrait was delivered to Ruyi Pavilion in the garden. In October 1852, she was promoted to "Noble Lady Wan" (婉贵人). In 1855, her status was elevated to "Concubine Wan" (婉嬪), but the ceremony was delayed until 1856 due to mourning period after Empress Dowager Kangci. She moved to Jingren palace after the promotion. She remained childless during Xianfeng era.

=== Tongzhi era ===
In 1861, after the coronation of Tongzhi Emperor, Lady Socoro and other consorts of the previous emperor were promoted. Lady Socoro was elevated to "Consort Wan" (婉妃). In 1874, she was promoted to "Noble Consort Wan" (婉貴妃).

=== Guangxu era ===
Noble Consort Wan died on 20 June 1894. Her coffin was interred in Ding Mausoleum of the Eastern Qing tombs in 1897.

== Titles ==
- During the reign of the Daoguang Emperor (r. 1820–1850):
  - Lady Socolo (from 17 November 1835)
- During the reign of the Xianfeng Emperor (r. 1850–1861):
  - First class female attendant Wan (婉常在; from 1851), seventh rank consort
  - Noble Lady Wan (婉贵人; from October 1852), sixth rank consort
  - Concubine Wan (婉嬪; from 1855), fifth rank consort
- During the reign of the Tongzhi Emperor (r. 1861–1875):
  - Consort Wan (婉妃; from 1861), fourth rank consort
  - Noble Consort Wan (婉貴妃; from 1874), third rank consort

== See also ==
- Ranks of imperial consorts in China#Qing
- Royal and noble ranks of the Qing dynasty
