= First Class Attendant Ping =

Member of the Irgen Gioro clan (died 1856)

unknown
- First Class Attendant Ping
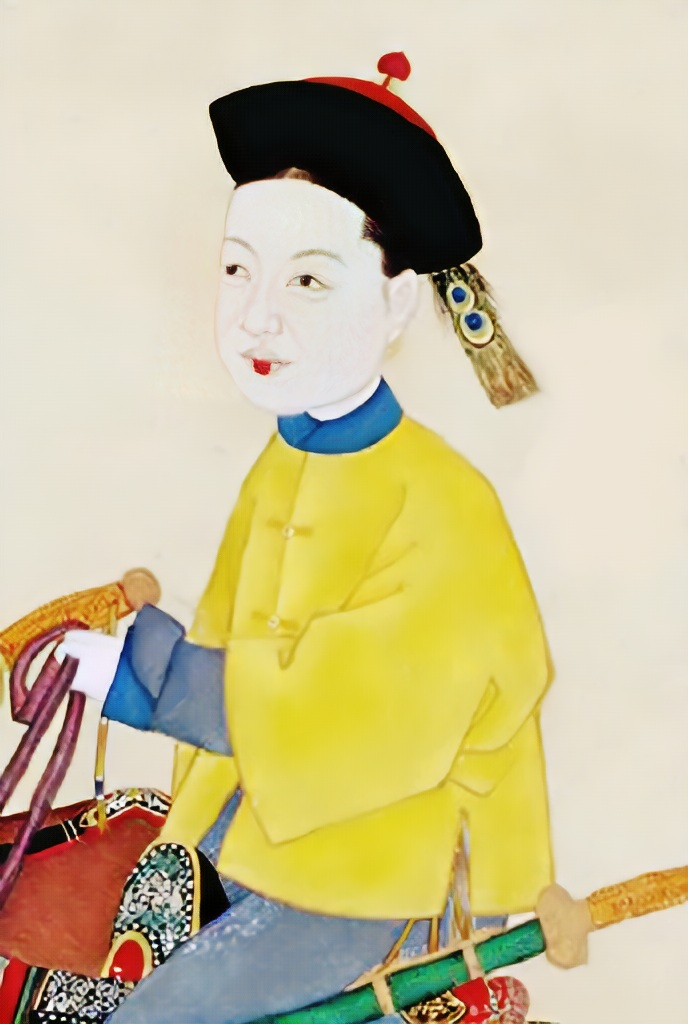
- Born: 19th century
- Died: 1856
- Spouse: Emperor Xianfeng
- Father: Ying Chun

First Class Attendant Ping (19th century – 1856),personal name unknown, was a member of the Irgen Gioro clan from the Manchu Bordered Yellow Banner. She was the eldest daughter of Yan Chang, a former sacrificial wine official at the Imperial Academy, and the granddaughter of Ying Chun, a court official. She was also the great-granddaughter of Cheng Ge, a Minister of War.

She was a concubine of the Emperor Xianfeng.

== Family background ==
First Class Attendant Ping's family descended from military officials. Her ancestor Hechen played a significant role in Qing conquests but his lineage did not inherit noble titles. However, in the Jiaqing era, her family regained prominence through success in the imperial examinations. Her father, Yan Chang, earned the Jinshi title (a high-ranking scholar) in 1847, while other family members also distinguished themselves academically and in official positions.

== Married life ==
In the second year of Emperor Xianfeng's reign, she was selected as Imperial Concubine Ying (a concubine title) through the Eight Banner selection process. She was officially granted the title in November of that year.

In the third year of Xianfeng's reign, she was demoted to Noble lady Yi (a lower-ranked concubine) along with another concubine, Noble lady Chun. Later, in the fifth year, she was further demoted to Yi Changzai, and eventually to Yi Daying (an even lower rank).

== Death and Burial ==
In the sixth year, she fell ill and was granted the title First Class Attendant Ping in May. However, she died in July of the same year. Her funeral rites were conducted according to imperial protocol, and she was later buried in the Imperial Mausoleum for Concubines in Dingling during the fourth year of Emperor Tongzhi's reign.
