= Consort Qing (Xianfeng) =

Consort of the Xianfeng Emperor (1840–1885)

- Born: 25 October 1840
- Died: 15 June 1885 (aged 44); Forbidden City
- Burial: Ding Mausoleum, Western Qing tombs
- Spouse: Xianfeng Emperor (m. 1855; died 1861)
- House: Zhang (張氏; by birth); Aisin Gioro (by marriage)
- Father: Yuanhu (园户)

Consort Qing
- Traditional Chinese: 慶妃
- Simplified Chinese: 慶妃
Transcriptions
Standard Mandarin
- Hanyu Pinyin: Qìng Fēi

Consort Qing (Chinese: 慶妃; pinyin: Qìng Fēi; 25 October 1840 – 15 June 1885), of the Han Chinese Zhang clan, was a consort of Xianfeng Emperor.

== Life ==
=== Family background ===
Consort Qing was a member of the Han Chinese Zhang clan.

- Father: Yuanhu (园户), served as a worker in the Imperial Gardens
  - Paternal grandfather: Yuanhu (苑户), a worker in the Imperial Gardens
- One younger brother and one elder brother.

=== Xianfeng era ===
Lady Zhang entered the Forbidden City in 1853 as a palace maid of Changchun palace. In 1855, she was granted a title of "Noble Lady Qing" (庆贵人; "qing" meaning "glad"). Wulingchun was one of the Four Spring Ladies (四春娘娘). The other ladies were : Noble Lady Lu, Noble Lady Ji and Noble Lady Xi. As a noble lady, she moved to Chuxiu palace and lived together with future Empress Dowager Cixi. She remained childless during Xianfeng era.

=== Tongzhi era ===
In 1861, Noble Lady Qing was promoted to "Concubine Qing" (庆嫔). In 1868, she moved to the Study of Happiness and Peace (吉安所) which had been a residence of Dowager Concubine Rong and lived there with Consort Xi.

=== Guangxu era ===
In 1875, Concubine Qing was further promoted to "Consort Qing" (慶妃). Zhang Wulingchun died on 15 June 1885 and was interred at Ding Mausoleum of the Eastern Qing tombs.

== Titles ==
- During the reign of the Xianfeng Emperor (r. 1850–1861):
  - Lady Zhang (from unknown date
  - Servant (from 1853)
  - Noble Lady Qing (慶貴人; from 1855), sixth rank consort
- During the reign of the Tongzhi Emperor (r. 1861–1875):
  - Concubine Qing (慶嬪; from 1861), fifth rank consort
- During the reign of the Guangxu Emperor (r. 1875–1908):
  - Consort Qing (慶妃; from 1875), fourth rank consort

== See also ==
- Ranks of imperial consorts in China#Qing
- Royal and noble ranks of the Qing dynasty
