= Eastern Qing tombs =

Imperial mausoleum complex of the Qing dynasty

Eastern Qing Tombs
UNESCO World Heritage Site
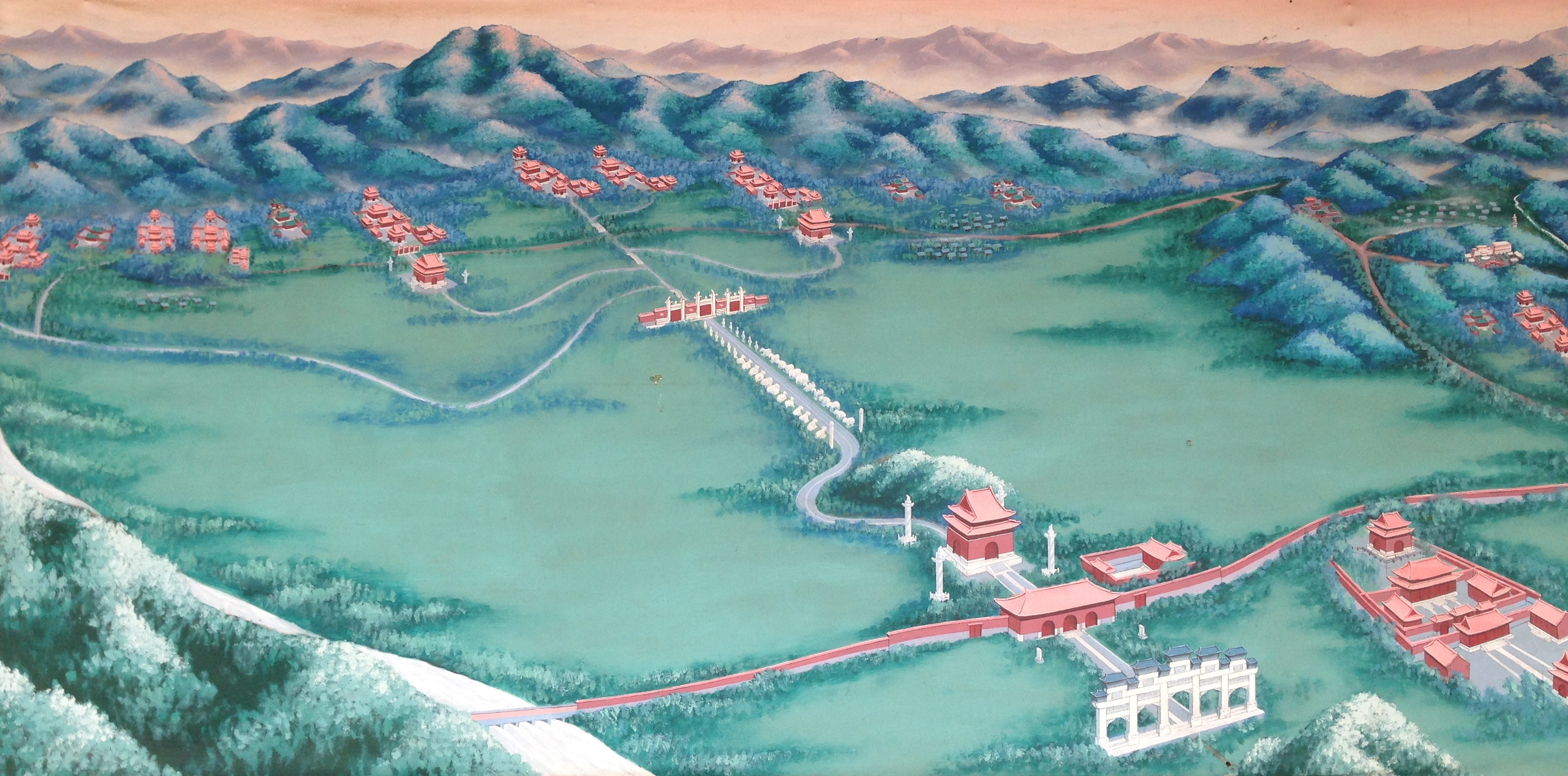
- Overhead impression map of the Qing Eastern mausoleums.

- Location within Hebei
- Location: Zunhua, Hebei, China
- Part of: Imperial Tombs of the Ming and Qing Dynasties
- Criteria: Cultural: (i)(ii)(iii)(iv)(vi)
- Reference: 1004ter-002
- Inscription: 2000 (24th Session)
- Extensions: 2003, 2004
- Area: 224 ha (550 acres)
- Buffer zone: 7,800 ha (19,000 acres)
- Website: http://www.qingdongling.com/
- Coordinates: 40°11′09″N 117°38′49″E

The Eastern Qing tombs (Chinese: 清東陵; pinyin: Qīng Dōng líng; Manchu: ᡩᡝᡵᡤᡳ
ᡝᡵᡤᡳ
ᠮᡠᠩᡤᠠᠨ, romanized: dergi ergi munggan) are an imperial mausoleum complex of the Qing dynasty located in Zunhua county of Tangshan in Hebei province, 125 kilometres (78 mi) northeast of Beijing. They are the largest, most complete, and best preserved extant mausoleum complex in China. Altogether, five emperors (Shunzhi, Kangxi, Qianlong, Xianfeng, and Tongzhi), 15 empresses, 136 imperial concubines, three princes, and two princesses of the Qing dynasty are buried here. Surrounded by Changrui Mountain, Jinxing Mountain, Huanghua Mountain, and Yingfei Daoyang Mountain, the tomb complex stretches over a total area of 80 square kilometres (31 sq mi).

== Description ==
Diagrammatic map of the Eastern Imperial mausoleums.

At the center of the Eastern Qing tombs lies Xiaoling, the tomb of the Shunzhi Emperor (1638–1661), who became the first Qing emperor to rule over China. Shunzhi was also the first emperor to be buried in the area. Buried with him are his empresses Xiaokangzhang (mother of the Kangxi Emperor) and Consort Donggo. The major tombs to the east of Shunzhi's mausoleum are Jingling (Kangxi Emperor) and Huiling (Tongzhi Emperor). To the west lie Yuling (Qianlong Emperor), Ding Dongling (Dowager Empresses Cixi and Ci'an), and Dingling (Xianfeng Emperor).

All imperial mausolea at the Eastern Qing tombs follow a pattern established by the Xiaoling mausoleum of the Shunzhi Emperor. The basic layout consists of three sections: spirit way, palaces, and offering kitchens. Xiaoling has the most elaborate spirit way and contains the following structures (from south to north): a stone archway, eastern and western dismounting stelae, grand palace gate, hall for changing clothes, divine merit stelae pavilion, stone sculptures, dragon-and-phoenix gate, one-arch bridge, seven-arch bridge, five-arch bridge, eastern and western dismounting stelae, three-way three-arch bridges and flat bridge. The palace section of Xiaoling contains the following structures (from south to north): spirit way stela pavilion, eastern and western halls for court officials, Long'en Gate, eastern and western sacrificial burners, eastern and western side halls, Long'en Hall (Chinese: 隆恩殿; pinyin: Lóng'ēn Diàn; lit. 'Hall of Enormous Grace'; Manchu: baili be ujelere deyen), gate of the burial chamber, two-pillar gate, stone altar-pieces, square city, memorial tower, glazed screen, crescent city, precious citadel, earth mound with the underground palace underneath. The north of the palace was closed off with walls. The section of the offering kitchens was positioned to the left of the palace section, it consists of a walled compound that contains the offering kitchens proper (i.e., where the sacrificial food was cooked), the southern and northern offering warehouses, and a slaughterhouse where the oxen and sheep were butchered.

Jingling is the tomb of the Kangxi Emperor. The spirit way leading to the tomb has a five-arch bridge; the guardian figures are placed on a curve close to the tomb itself, and are more decorated than earlier ones.

Yuling, the tomb of the Qianlong Emperor (the fourth emperor of the Qing dynasty), is one of the most splendid one of all royal tombs in Chinese history. Yuling has the finest tomb chamber, a series of nine vaults separated by four solid marble doors located at a depth of 54 metres (177 ft). Beginning with the first marble gate, all walls, vaulted ceilings, and gates are covered with Buddhist imagery such as the four heavenly kings, the eight bodhisattvas, the 24 buddhas, lions, the Eight Treasures, as well as ritual instruments and more than 30,000 words of Tibetan scripture and Sanskrit. The 3-ton doors themselves have reliefs of bodhisattvas (beings on the road to enlightenment) and the four protective kings usually found at temple entrances. The Qianlong Emperor (died 1799) selected the site of his mausoleum in 1742 and construction began in the following year. Construction was completed in 1752, but the mausoleum was expanded further in the years between 1755 and 1762. During this time, the square city, memorial tower, the precious citadel, as well as the two side halls were newly built.

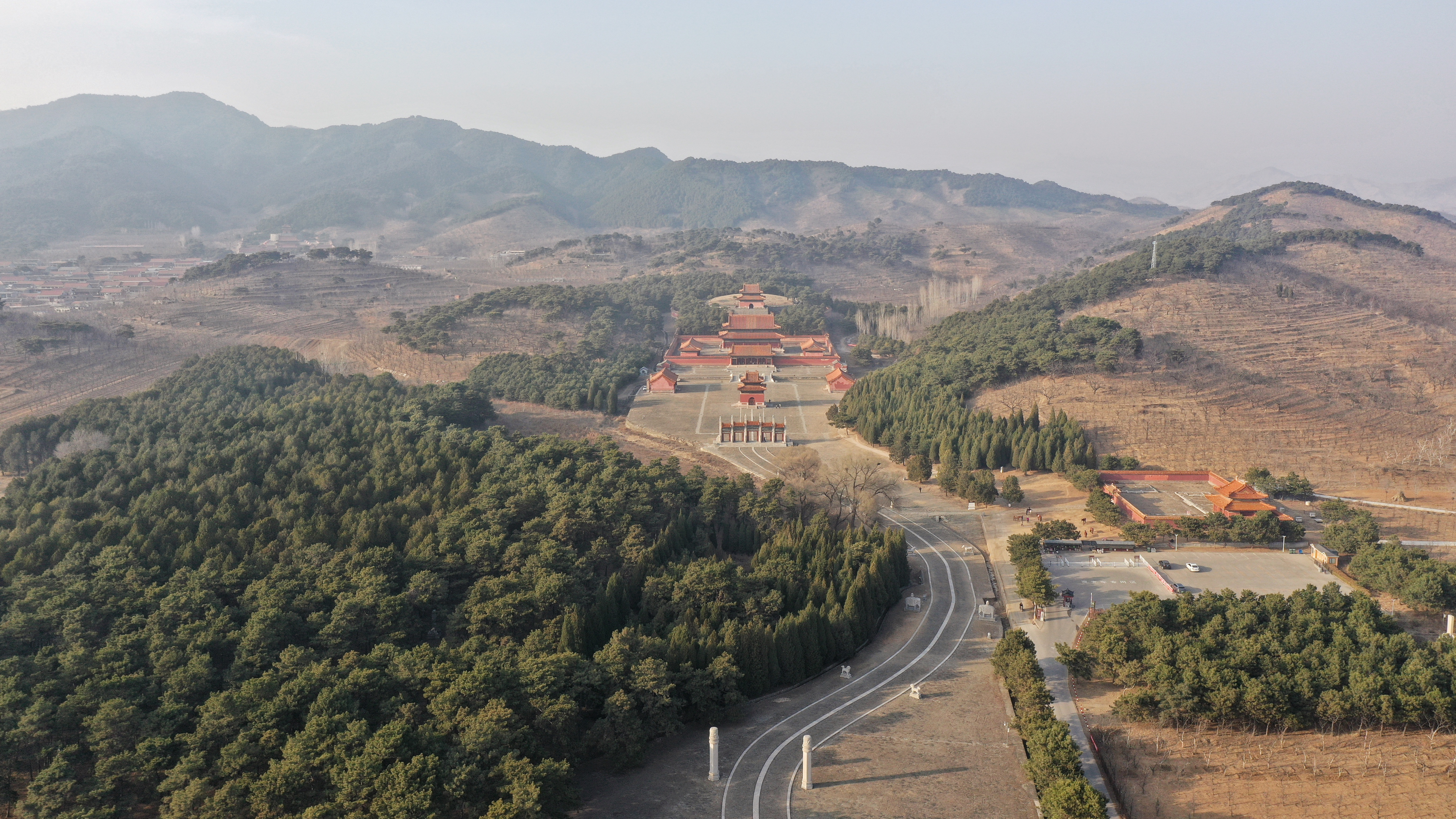
Yu Mausoleum, of the Qianlong Emperor.

Ding Dongling, the tomb of Empress Dowager Cixi stands out for its extremely lavish decoration. The Long'en Hall along with its eastern and western side halls is made from valuable red wood timbers. All three halls are decorated with gold-glazed paintings, gilded dragons, and carved stone rails. Today, the main hall contains reproductions of pictures produced in 1903 by Cixi's photo studio within the Summer Palace. Everywhere there are reminders of the Forbidden City, such as the terrace-corner spouts carved as water-loving dragons. The interior has motifs strikingly painted in gold on dark wood, a reminder of the buildings where she spent her last years. There are walls of carved and gilded brick, and wooden dragons writhe down the columns.

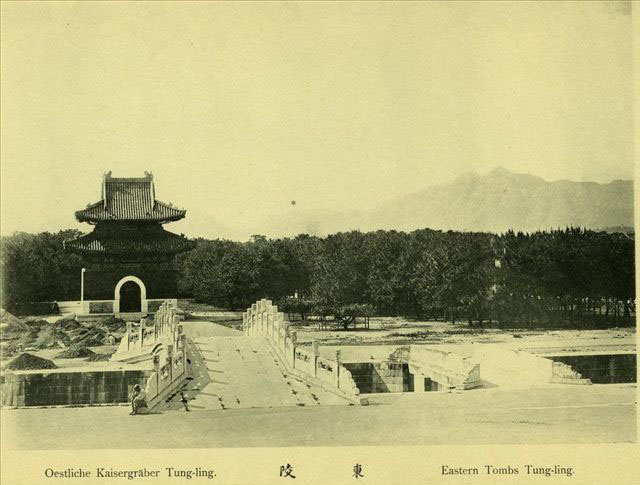
Eastern Qing tombs in 1900.

Zhaoxiling, the tomb of the Empress Dowager Xiaozhuang, the mother of the Shunzhi Emperor is located to the east of the entrance to the spirit way that leads to the tomb of Shunzhi. Xiaozhuang is believed to have played an important role in consolidating early Qing dynasty authority. The mausoleum was started as a temporary resting hall under the direction of the Kangxi Emperor, who was the grandson of Xiaozhuang and followed her wishes in making this arrangement. The temporary hall was converted into the Zhaoxiling mausoleum in 1725, during the reign of the Yongzheng Emperor.

The tombs of Empress Dowager Cixi and the Qianlong Emperor were looted by troops under the command of the warlord Sun Dianying in 1928. Other tombs were looted in the 1940s and 1950s, leaving only the tomb of the Shunzhi Emperor untouched. The burial chambers of four of the tombs, namely the Qianlong Emperor, Empress Dowager Cixi and two of the Qianlong Emperor's concubines, are open to the public.

== Main tombs ==
Visual tour of the Qing Dynasty Eastern Tombs, of the Empress Dowager Cixi.

- Xiaoling (Chinese: 孝陵; pinyin: Xiàolíng; lit. 'Tomb of Filial Piety'; Manchu: hiyoošungga munggan) for the Shunzhi Emperor (1638–1661, the 1st Qing emperor to rule over China)
- Jingling (Chinese: 景陵; pinyin: Jǐnglíng; lit. 'Tomb of Majestic'; Manchu: ambalinggū munggan) for the Kangxi Emperor (1654–1722, the 2nd emperor)
- Yuling (Chinese: 裕陵; pinyin: Yùlíng; lit. 'Tomb of Sedate'; Manchu: tomohonggo munggan) for the Qianlong Emperor (1711–1799, the 4th emperor)
- Dingling (Chinese: 定陵; pinyin: Dìnglíng; lit. 'Tomb of Stability'; Manchu: tokton munggan) for the Xianfeng Emperor (1831–1861, the 7th emperor)
- Huiling (Chinese: 惠陵; pinyin: Huìlíng; lit. 'Tomb of Kindness'; Manchu: fulehungge munggan) for the Tongzhi Emperor (1856–1875, the 8th emperor)
- Ding Dongling (Chinese: 定東陵; pinyin: Dìng Dōng Líng; lit. 'Eastern Tomb of Stability') composed of:
  - Putuo Yu Ding Dongling (Chinese: 菩陀峪定東陵; lit. 'Tomb east of Dingling in the Potala valley') for Empress Dowager Cixi (1835–1908)
  - Puxiang Yu Ding Dongling (Chinese: 普祥峪定東陵; lit. 'Tomb east of Dingling in the broad valley of good omens') for Empress Dowager Cian (1837–1881)

An abandoned construction site for the mausoleum of the Daoguang Emperor is also located in the Eastern Qing Tombs. The emperor decided to move his tomb (muling; 慕陵) to the Western Qing tombs after water seeped into the burial chamber at the original site. The already built structures were dismantled and moved to the Western Qing Tombs. Two sons and two daughters of Daoguang are buried in the Eastern Qing tombs (in the "Tomb of the Princess").

There has been pillaging taking place.

== See also ==
- Looting of the Eastern Mausoleum
- Western Qing tombs
- Imperial Tombs of the Ming and Qing Dynasties
