= List of Chinese princesses =

The following is a list of people holding the title of princess throughout the history of China by dynasty.

== Shang dynasty (商朝; c. 1600–1046/c. 1570—1045 BCE) ==
Princesses of the Shang dynasty
Name	Life	Parents		Spouse(s)/Children	Notes	Ref
Name	Life	Mother	Father	Spouse(s)/Children	Notes	Ref
Unknown	??? - ???	Fu Hao	Wu Ding	Unknown	She was the full sister of Zu Ji.	
Unknown	???-???	Fu Hao	Wu Ding	Unknown		
Xiao Chen Tuo (小臣妥)	???- 1100s BCE	Fu Tuo	Wu Ding	Unknown	She was a minister	

== Zhou dynasty (1046–256 BCE) ==
Princesses of the Zhou dynasty
Name	Life	Parents		Spouse(s)	Children	Notes	Ref
Name	Life	Mother	Father	Spouse(s)	Children	Notes	Ref
Daji (大姬)	???-???	Unknown	King Wu of Zhou	Duke Hu of Chen	Duke Shen of Chen; Chen Xianggong	She was the eldest daughter of King Wu of Zhou	

== Han Dynasty (202 BCE–220 CE) ==
Princesses of Western Han Dynasty
Name	Life	Parents		Spouse(s)	Children	Notes	Ref
Name	Life	Mother	Father	Spouse(s)	Children	Notes	Ref
Princess Yuan of Lu (魯元公主)	c.217 BC - May 187 BC	Empress Lü	Emperor Gaozu	Zhang Ao	Empress Xiaohui; Zhang Yan, Marquis of Nangong	She was the mother-in-law of Emperor Hui through her daughter's marriage.	
Piao,Eldest Princess Guantao (館陶長公主)	189 - 116 BCE	Empress Xiaowen	Emperor Wen	Chen Wu; Marquis Tangyi	Two sons; Empress Chen	She was the mother-in-law of Emperor Wu through her daughter's marriage.	
Princess Changping (昌平公主)	???-???	Unknown	Emperor Wen	Zhou Shengzhi	Unknown	Records of the Grand Historian refers to her only as “the princess,” while the Yuan dynasty's Comprehensive Examination of Literature identifies her as Princess Changping.	
Princess Pingyang (平陽公主)	2nd century BC - After 111 BC	Empress Xiaojing	Emperor Jing	Cao Shi, Marquess of Pingyang; Xiahou Po, Marquess of Ruyin; Wei Qing, Marquess Lie of Changping	Cao Xiang	Although her formal title was Grand Princess Yangxin (陽信長公主), she came to be commonly known as Princess Pingyang following the enfeoffment of her first husband, Cao Shi as Marquess of Pingyang.	
Princess Nangong (南宮公主)	???-???	Empress Xiaojing	Emperor Jing	Zhang Zuo, Marquis Nangong; Zhang Hou Yeshen	Unknown	She divorced her second husband due to him disrespecting her.	
Princess Longlü (隆慮公主)	???-???	Empress Xiaojing	Emperor Jing	Chen Jiao, Marquis Longlü	Zhaoping Jun	Emperor Wu of Han executed Zhao Ping jun.	
Grand Princess Wei (衛長公主)	138 BC - ???	Empress Xiaowusi	Emperor Wu	Cao Xiang, Marquis of Pingyang; Luan Da, Marquis of Letong	Cao Zong	She was also known as Princess Dangli	
Princess Zhuyi (諸邑公主)	???- 91 BC	Empress Xiaowusi	Emperor Wu	Unknown	Unknown	She was executed for witchcraft.	
Princess Shiyi (石邑公主)	???-???	Empress Xiaowusi	Emperor Wu	Unknown	Unknown	Princesses Shiyi maybe the same as Princess Yangshi but it is uncertain.	
Princess Eyi (鄂邑公主)	???-80 BCE	Unknown	Emperor Wu	Unknown	Wen Xin	Upon the accession of her younger brother, Emperor Zhao, at the age of eight, she took custody of the imperial seals and was granted the title of Grand Princess.	
Princess Yi'an (夷安公主)	???-???	Unknown	Emperor Wu	Zhaoping Jun	Unknown	She married her aunt Princess Longlü 's son, Zhaoping Jun.	
Princess Yangshi (阳石公主)	???- 91 BC	Unknown	Emperor Wu	Unknown	Unknown	She was executed for wicthcraft.	
Liu Shi,Princess Guantao (館陶公主)	71 BC-???	Jieyu, of the Hua clan	Emperor Xuan	Yu Yong, Marquis Xiping	Unknown	She was the adopted daughter of Huo Chengjun.	
Princess Jingwu (敬武公主)	???-3	Unknown	Emperor Xuan	Zhang Lin, Marquis Fuping; Zhao Qin, Marquis Linping; Xue Xuan, Marquis Gaoyang	Zhang Fang	Princess Jingwu was poisoned by Wang Mang.	
Princess Pingdu (平都公主)	???-???	Consort Fu	Emperor Yuan	Unknown	Unknown	She was the aunt of Emperor Ai of Han.	
Princess Pingyang (平陽公主)	???-???		Emperor Yuan	Unknown	Unknown		
Princess Yingyi (潁邑公主)	???-???	Unknown	Emperor Yuan	Du Ye (杜業)	None		

Princesses Of Xin Dynasty
Name	Life	Parents		Spouse(s)	Children	Notes	Ref
Name	Life	Mother	Father	Spouse(s)	Children	Notes	Ref
Empress Xiaoping (孝平王皇后)	9 BC - 23 AD	Empress Wang	Wang Mang	Emperor Ping of Han	None	She committed suicide by immolation.	
Wang Ye (王晔) Mu Xiuren (睦脩任)	?-?	Zengzhi	Wang Mang	Unknown	Unknown		
Wang Jie (王捷) Muzu Ren (睦逮任)	?-?	Kaiming	Wang Mang	Unknown	UnKnown		

Princesses Of Eastern Han Dynasty
Name	Life	Parents		Spouse(s)	Children	Notes	Ref
Name	Life	Mother	Father	Spouse(s)	Children	Notes	Ref
Liu Huang (刘黄) Princess Huyang (湖阳公主)	???-???	Fan Xiandu (樊嫻都)	Liu Qin	Unknown	Unknown		
Liu Yuan (劉元) Princess Xinye (新野公主)	???-22 CE	Fan Xiandu (樊嫺都)	Liu Qin	Deng Chen	1 Son 3 Daughters		

== Tang Dynasty (618–907 CE) ==
Princesses Of Tang Dynasty
Name	Life	Parents		Spouse(s)	Children	Notes	Ref
Name	Life	Mother	Father	Spouse(s)	Children	Notes	Ref
Princess Si of Anding (安定思公主)	654 - 654			None	None	She is the elder daughter of Wu zetain and suspected to be murdered either by Empress Wang or Wu Zetian	
Princess Taiping (太平公主)	After 662 - 2 August 713	Wu Zetian	Emperor Gaozong of Tang	Xue Shao; Wu Youji, Prince Zhongjian of Ding	Xue Chongxun; Xue Chongjian; Lady Wanquan; Wu Chongmin; Wu Chongxing; Lady Wu; Lady Yonghe (possibly)	She was prominent political figure during Wu Zetian's Zhou dynasty and the Tang dynasty during the reigns of Emperor Zhongzong and Emperor Ruizong,especially during Emperor Ruizong's second reign, when for three years until her death, she was the real power behind the throne.	

== Five Dynasties and Ten Kingdoms (907–960 CE) ==
Name/Title	Birthdate	Mother	Father	Spouse(s)	Children	Death date	Ref
Empress Li		Lady Cao	Li Siyuan	Shi Jingtang		October 7, 950	
Liu Hua	896		Liu Yin			May 31, 930	

== Song Dynasty (960–1279 CE) ==
Name/Title	Birthdate	Mother	Father	Spouse(s)	Children	Death date	Ref
Princess Xiansu		Empress Xiaohui	Emperor Taizu of Song	Wang Chengyan		1008	
Princess Xianjing		Empress Xiaohui	Emperor Taizu of Song	Shi Baoji		1009	
Princess Xianhui			Emperor Taizu of Song	Wei Xianxin		999	
Princess Anhui			Emperor Taizu of Song				
Princess Xianhui			Emperor Taizu of Song				
Princess Xuanhui			Emperor Taizu of Song				

== Liao Dynasty (907–1125 CE) ==
Name/Title	Birthdate	Mother	Father	Spouse(s)	Children	Death date	Ref.
Yelü Zhigu		Empress Chunqin	Abaoji	Xiao Shilu		911	
Lübugu,Princess of Yan			Abaoji	Xiao Siwen	Empress Ruizhi 2 daughters		
Yelü Chaogui			Abaoji	Xiao Hailuo	Xiao Tuyu	951	
Yelu Abuli		Empress Dowager Xiao (Shizong)	Abaoji	Xiao Han		949	

== Western Xia (1038–1227 CE) ==
Name/Title	Birthdate	Mother	Father	Spouse(s)	Children	Death date	Ref.
Princess Li			Emperor Jingzong				

== Jin Dynasty (1115–1234 CE) ==
Name/Title	Birthdate	Mother	Father	Spouse(s)	Children	Death date	Ref.
Princess of Bi			Emperor Taizu	Wugulun Elun (烏古論訛論)	one son		
Princess Wanyan			Emperor Taizu	Pucha Shijianu (蒲察石家奴			

== Yuan Dynasty (1271–1368 CE) ==
Name/Title	Birthdate	Mother	Father	Spouse(s)	Children	Death date	Ref.
Yuelie, Grand Princess of Zhao		Empress Zhaorui Shunsheng	Kublai Khan	Ay Buqa, Prince of Zhao	four sons		
Princess Ulujin, Grand Princess of Chang State		Empress Zhaorui Shunsheng	Kublai Khan	Buqa from the Ikires cla			
Chalun, Grand Princess of Chang State		Empress Zhaorui Shunsheng	Kublai Khan	Teliqian from the Ikires clan			
Öljei, Grand Princess of Lu		Empress Zhaorui Shunsheng	Kublai Khan	Ulujin Küregen of the Bosquur clan of Khongirad	A daughter		
Nangiajin, Grand Princess of Lu		Empress Zhaorui Shunsheng	Kublai Khan	Ulujin Küregen from the Khongirad clan			
Qutugh Kelmysh, Queen Jangmok of Goryeo		Empress Zhaorui Shunsheng	Kublai Khan	Wang Ko, Chungnyeol of Goryeo	two sons and one daughter		
Princess Chang			Temür Khan				
Princess Zhao			Temür Khan				
Princess Lu			Temür Khan				
Kökelün, Grand Princess of Lü State			Ayurbarwada Buyantu Khan	Duoluben Küregen			
Princess of Zheng State		Empress Consort Empress Munashiri	Toghon Temür	Bohon Müsütw, Prince Zhendong of Wucheng			
Princess of Chu State		Empress Consort Empress Munashiri	Toghon Temür	Seping Chimän Sitü, Prince of Liao (色坪持滿思特 遼王) of the Hongjila clan			
Princess of Yan State		Empress Consort Empress Munashiri	Toghon Temür	Prince Nan of Zhongcheng (南忠成王) of the Hongjila clan			
Princess of Wan State		Empress Consort Empress Munashiri	Toghon Temür	Empress Consort Empress Munashiri, of the Hongjila clan			
Princess of Shu State		Empress Consort Empress Munashiri	Toghon Temür	Bätöng Gemän, Prince of Anping (安平王)			

== Ming Dynasty (1368–1644 CE) ==
Name/Title	Birthdate	Mother	Father	Spouse(s)	Children	Death date	Ref.
Zhu Jingjing,Princess Lin'an	1360	Noble Consort Chengmu	Hongwu Emperor	Li Qi (李祺; d. 1402), a son of Li Shanchang	Two Sons	17 August 1421	
Zhu Changning,Princess Ningguo	1364	Empress Xiaocigao	Hongwu Emperor	Mei Yin, the nephew of Runan Hou Meisizu	two sons (maybe three)	7 September 1434	
Princess Chongning		Unknown	Hongwu Emperor	Niu Cheng (牛城)			
Princess Anqing		Empress Xiaocigao	Hongwu Emperor	Ouyang Lun (歐陽倫; d. 23 July 1397)			
Princess Runing		Consort Ning	Hongwu Emperor				
Princess Huaiqing	1366	Noble Consort Chengmu	Hongwu Emperor	Wang Ning, Marquis of Yongchun	two sons	15 July 1425	
Princess Daming	1368	Consort Ning	Hongwu Emperor			30 March 1426	
Princess Fuqing	1370	Consort An	Hongwu Emperor			28 February 1417	
Princess Shouchun	1370	Unknown	Hongwu Emperor	Fu Zhong, the son of Fu Youde, Duke of Ying			
Zhu Yuhua ,Princess Nankang	1373	Lin	Hongwu Emperor	Hu Guan, the son of Hu Hai, the Marquis of Dongchuan	Hu Zhong	November 15, 1438	
Princess Zhenyi of Yongjia	1455	Consort Guo	Hongwu Emperor	Guo Zhen, the eldest son of Guo Ying, the Marquis of Wuding			
Princess Hanshan	1381	"Han woman sent as tribute."	Hongwu Emperor	Yin Qing	Yoon Hoon, Yoon Ok	October 18, 1462	
Princess Ruyang		Consort Guo	Hongwu Emperor	Xie Da, the son of Xie Yan, a founding hero			
Princess Baoqing	1395	Unknown	Hongwu Emperor	Zhao Hui			
Zhu Yuying,Princess Yong'an	20 July 1377	Empress Renxiaowen	Yongle Emperor	Yuan Rong, Marquis of Guangping	Yuan Zhen Yuan Ningning Yuan Yaoying Yuan Shou'en	26 January 1417	
Yuegui,Princess Yongping			Yongle Emperor			22 April 1444	
Princess Ancheng			Yongle Emperor				
Princess Xianning			Yongle Emperor				
Princess Changning			Yongle Emperor				
Princess Jiaxing	1409	Empress Chengxiaozhao	Hongxi Emperor	Jing Yuan		March 9, 1439	
Zhu Yuantong,Princess Qingdu	September 1, 1409	Consort Zhao	Hongxi Emperor	Jiao Jing		1440	
Princess Qinghe			Hongxi Emperor				
Princess De'an			Hongxi Emperor				
Princess Yanping			Hongxi Emperor				
Princess Deqing			Hongxi Emperor				
Princess Zhending			Hongxi Emperor				
Princess Shunde	1420	Empress Hu	Xuande Emperor	Shi Jing		1443	
Princess Yongqing			Xuande Emperor			1433	
Princess Changde	1424	Empress Sun	Xuande Emperor	Xue Huan		1470	
Princess Chongqing			Emperor Yingzong of Ming				
Princess Jiashan			Emperor Yingzong of Ming				
Princess Chun'an			Emperor Yingzong of Ming				
Princess Guangde			Emperor Yingzong of Ming				
Princess Longqing			Emperor Yingzong of Ming				
Princess Yixing			Emperor Yingzong of Ming				
Princess Jiaxiang			Emperor Yingzong of Ming				
Princess Gu'an			Jingtai Emperor				
Princess Renhe			Chenghua Emperor				
Princess Yongkang			Chenghua Emperor				
Princess Deqing			Chenghua Emperor				
Princess Changtai			Chenghua Emperor				
Princess Xianyou			Chenghua Emperor				
Princess Taikang			Hongzhi Emperor				
Princess Chang'an			Jiajing Emperor				
Princess Sirou			Jiajing Emperor				
Princess Ning'an			Jiajing Emperor	Li He			
Princess Guishan			Jiajing Emperor				
Princess Jiashan			Jiajing Emperor	Xu Congcheng			
Princess Penglai			Wanli Emperor				
Princess Taihe			Wanli Emperor				
Yao’e,Princess Shouyang			Wanli Emperor	Hou Gongchen			
Yaoying,Princess Yongning			Wanli Emperor	Liang Bangrui			
Yaoyuan ,Princess Rui'an			Wanli Emperor	Wan Wei			
Yaoji ,Princess Yanqing			Wanli Emperor				
Princess Qixia			Wanli Emperor				
Princess Daoyi			Taichang Emperor				
Huijian,Princess Huaishu			Taichang Emperor				
Huixian,Princess Daoshun			Taichang Emperor				
Huijing,Princess Suiping			Taichang Emperor	Qi Zanyuan			
Huiti ,Princess Le'an			Taichang Emperor				
Huiyan,Liu Youfu			Taichang Emperor				
Huizheng,Princess Daowen			Taichang Emperor				
Shu'e ,Princess Yongning			Tianqi Emperor				
Shumo ,Princess Huaining			Tianqi Emperor				
Princess Kunyi			Chongzhen Emperor				
Princess Changping	2 May 1630	Empress Zhou	Chongzhen Emperor	Zhou Xian	Unborn Child	26 September 1647	
Princess Zhaoren	1639	Empress Zhou	Chongzhen Emperor			24 April 1644	

== Qing Dynasty (1644–1912 CE) ==
=== Ranks of Qing Princesses ===
In the Qing dynasty, An emperor's daughter was not automatically granted the title of princess at birth. Instead, the formal title was conferred usually when she reached the age of marriage—often following a specific ceremony. This practice meant that many daughters, despite being born to the emperor, did not receive the official title are thus excluded from this list that focuses solely on formally titled princesses.

In the Qing dynasty, the title of princess was mainly divided into two groups 公主(Gōngzhǔ) for the daughters of the emperor and 格格(GeGe) for the daughters of the princes (GeGe is from Manchuria language. This word means the unmarried girls of the noble families. At the same time, Gege was also a noble title for lower rank princess and the lower rank concubines of the Prince).

==== Ranks of The Daughters of the Emperor ====
1. 固倫公主 (Gùlún Gōngzhǔ) / ᡤᡠᡵᡠᠨ ᡳ ᡤᡠᠩᠵᡠ (Gurun-i Gungju): Translated as "State Princess" or "Princess of the First Rank." This was the highest rank and was typically bestowed upon daughters born to the Empress (皇后, Huánghòu). Gurun means "all under Heaven" in Manchu, signifying the high status of these princesses. Their husbands were titled 固倫額駙 (Gùlún Éfù).

Princesses of the First Rank (Qing Dynasty)
Name	Life	Parents		Spouse(s)/Gùlún Éfù	Children	Ref
Name	Life	Mother	Father	Spouse(s)/Gùlún Éfù	Children	Ref
Princess Aohan of the First Rank (敖漢固倫公主)	3 April 1621: February/March 1654	Consort Ji	Hong Taiji	Bandi (班第; ? – 1647) of the Mongol Aohan Borjigin clan	4 sons and 1 daughter	
Makata, Princess Wenzhuang of the First Rank (固倫溫莊公主)	10 September 1625: April/May 1663	Empress Xiaoduanwen	Hong Taiji	Ejei (額哲; ? – 1641) of the Chahar Borjigin clan Abunai (阿布奈; 1635–1675) of the Chahar Borjigin cla	Two sons	
Princess Jingduan of the First Rank (固倫靖端公主)	2 August 1628: June/July 1686	Empress Xiaoduanwen	Hong Taiji	Kitad (奇塔特; ? – 1653) of the Khorchin Borjigin clan	Erdeni, Prince of Khorchindoro	
Yatu, Princess Yongmu of the First Rank (固倫雍穆公主)	31 January 1629: February/March 1678	Empress Xiaozhuangwen	Hong Taiji	Birtakhar (弼爾塔哈爾; ? – 1667) of the Khorchin Borjigin clan		
Atu, Princess Shuhui of the First Rank (固倫淑慧公主)	2 March 1632: 28 February 1700	Empress Xiaozhuangwen	Hong Taiji	Suo'erha (索爾哈) of the Khalkha Borjigin clan Sabdan (色布騰; ? – 1667) of the Barin Borjigin clan		
Princess of the First Rank (固倫公主)	15 December 1633: April/May 1649	Unknown	Hong Taiji	Kūwaja (誇札; ? – 1649) of the Manchu Irgen Gioro clan		
Princess Shuzhe Duanxian of the First Rank (固倫淑哲端獻公主)	15 December 1633: April/May 1649	Empress Xiaozhuangwen	Hong Taiji	Lamasi (喇瑪思) of the Jarud Borjigin		
Princess Yong'an Duanzhen of the First Rank (固倫永安端貞公主)	7 October 1634: February/March 1692	Empress Xiaoduanwen	Hong Taiji	Bayasihulang (巴雅斯護朗) of the Khorchin Borjigin clan		
Princess Duanshun of the First Rank (固倫端順公主)	30 April 1636: July/August 1650		Hong Taiji	Garma Sodnam (噶爾瑪索諾木; ? – 1663) of the Mongol Abaga Borjigin clan		
Princess Rongxian of the First Rank	20 June 1673: 29 May 1728	Consort Rong	Kangxi Emperor	Urgun of the Mongolian Balin tribe		
Princess Kejing of the First Rank			Kangxi Emperor			
Princess Wenxian of the First Rank	10 November 1683: August/September 1702	Empress Xiaogongren	Kangxi Emperor	Shun'anyan (舜安顏; ? – 1724) of the Manchu Tunggiya clan		
Princess Chunque of the First Rank			Kangxi Emperor			
Princess Hejing of the First Rank	31 July 1731: 30 September 1792	Empress Xiaoxianchun	Qianlong Emperor	Septeng Baljur	Eleke Temur Babai; Four daughters	
Princess Hejing of the First Rank	10 August 1756: 9 February 1775	Empress Xiaoyichun	Qianlong Emperor	Lhawang Dorji		
Princess Hexiao of the First Rank	2 February 1775: 13 October 1823	Consort Dun	Qianlong Emperor	Fengšeninde		
Princess Zhuangjing of the First Rank	20 October 1784: 27 June 1811	Empress Xiaoshurui	Jiaqing Emperor	Manibadala (瑪尼巴達喇; ? – 1832) of the Mongol Tumed Borjigin clan		
Princess Huimin of the First Rank	18 February 1811: 28 June 1815	Imperial Noble Consort Gongshun	Jiaqing Emperor			
Princess Duanmin of the First Rank	29 July 1813: 7 December 1819	Empress Xiaoshencheng	Daoguang Emperor			
Princess Duanshun of the First Rank	8 April 1825: 27 December 1835	Empress Xiaoquancheng	Daoguang Emperor			
Princess Shou'an of the First Rank (固伦寿安公主)	12 May 1826: 24 March 1860	Empress Xiaoquancheng	Daoguang Emperor	Demchüghjab (德穆楚克扎布; ? – 1865) of the Mongol Naiman Borjigin clan		
Princess Shou'en of the First Rank (固伦寿恩公主)	20 January 1831: 15 May 1859	Empress Xiaojingcheng	Daoguang Emperor	Jingshou (景壽; 1829–1889) of the Manchu Fuca clan		
Princess Shouzhuang of the First Rank (固伦寿庄)	24 March 1842: 11 March 1884	Imperial Noble Consort Zhuangshun	Daoguang Emperor	Dehui (德徽) of the Manchu Bolod clan		
Princess Rong'an of the First Rank (固伦荣安公主)	20 June 1855: 5 February 1875	Imperial Noble Consort Zhuangjing	Xianfeng Emperor	Fuzhen (符珍; ? – 1909) of the Manchu Gūwalgiya clan	A miscarriage	

- 和碩公主 (Héshuò Gōngzhǔ) / ᡥᠣᡧᠣᡳ ᡤᡠᠩᠵᡠ (Hošo-i Gungju): Translated as "Heshuo Princess" or "Princess of the Second Rank." This rank was usually granted to daughters born to Imperial Consorts (妃, Fēi) or other high-ranking concubines or the emperor foster daughter. Hošo means "four corners, four sides" in Manchu. Their husbands were titled 和碩額駙 (Héshuò Éfù).

List of Princess of the Second Rank (Qing Dynasty)
Name/Title	Life Span		Parents		Spouse(s)	Children	Ref.
Name/Title	Birthdate	Death date	Mother	Father	Spouse(s)	Children	
Princess of the Second Rank	30 November 1635	August/September 1661		Hong Taiji	Huisai (輝塞; ? – 1651) of the Manchu Gūwalgiya clan		
Princess Kechun of the Second Rank (和碩恪純公主)	7 January 1642 – December 1704	December 1704 or January 1705		Hong Taiji	Wu Yingxiong (吳應熊; 1634 – 18 May 1674)	Three sons and one daughter.	
Princess Gongque of the Second Rank	19 January 1654	26 November 1685		Shunzhi Emperor	Na'erdu of the Manchu Gūwalgiya clan		
Princess Duanjing of the Second Rank			Bu Guiren Zhaojia	Kangxi Emperor	Galzang of Kharachin tribe of Mongolia		
Princess Wenke of the Second Rank	31 December 1687	27 July 1709	Imperial Noble Consort Jingmin Zhangjia	Kangxi Emperor	Cangjin, the Prince of Duleng of the Mongolian Ongniud tribe	twin daughters	
Princess Quejing of the Second Rank				Kangxi Emperor			
Princess Dunke of the Second Rank	3 February 1691	2 January 1710	Imperial Noble Consort Jingmin Zhangjia	Kangxi Emperor			
Princess Huaike of the Second Rank	15 August 1695	April/May 1717	Consort Qi	Yongzheng Emperor	Xingde of the Manchu Nara clan		
Princess Hejia of the Second Rank	24 December 1745	29 October 1767	Imperial Noble Consort Chunhui	Qianlong Emperor	Fulong'an	Fengshenjilun Fengshenguolemin	
Princess Heke of the Second Rank	17 August 1758	14 December 1780	Empress Xiaoyichun	Qianlong Emperor	Jalantai (扎兰泰) of the Uya clan	1 daughter	
Princess Zhuangjing of the Second Rank	30 January 1782	4 April 1811	Imperial Noble Consort Heyu	Jiaqing Emperor	Sodnamdorji (索特納木多布濟; ? – 1825) of the Mongol Khorchin Borjigin		
Princess Hui'an of the Second Rank	31 December 1786	June/July 1795	Concubine Xun	Jiaqing Emperor			
Princess Shouzang of the Second Rank (和硕寿臧公主)	15 November 1829	9 August 1856	Consort Xiang	Daoguang Emperor	Enchong (恩崇; ? – 1864) of the Manchu Namdulu clan		
Princess Shouxi of the Second Rank (和硕寿禧公主)	7 January 1842	10 September 1866	Noble Consort Tong	Daoguang Emperor	Jalafungga (扎拉豐阿; ? – 1898) of the Manchu Niohuru clan		

==== EXCEPTIONS ====
1. The Ninth Princess of Hong Taiji: Because her birth mother Lady Jarud Borjigit was divorced by Hong Taiji , she did not receive any princess title during her lifetime. She was married at the age of 14 to Hashang (哈尚; ? – 1651) of the Mongol Borjigin clan and died at the age of 18.
2. Princess of the Third Rank(鄉君): Because the rule "Emperor's daughters must be 1st or 2nd rank was not set in stone yet, this daughter of Hong Taiji's was a Princess of the Third Rank despite being a daughter of the emperor, she married Bandi (班迪; ? – 1700) of the Mongol Borjigin clan.

==== Ranks of The Daughters of the Prince ====
- 郡主 (Jùnzhǔ) / ᡥᠣᡧᠣᡳ ᡤᡝᡤᡝ (Hošo-i Gege): Translated as "Princess of a Commandery" or "Princess of the Third Rank." This title was typically given to the daughters of Princes of the First Rank (親王, Qīnwáng) with their wife. They were also sometimes referred to as 和碩格格 (Héshuò Gége) or 親王格格 (Qīnwáng Gége), literally "lady of a prince of the blood." In special circumstances, daughters of lower-ranking princes or even adopted daughters of the Emperor could be elevated to this rank or even higher. Their husbands were titled 郡額駙 (Jùn Éfù).
- 縣主 (Xiànzhǔ) / ᡩᠣᡵᠣ ᡳ ᡤᡝᡤᡝ (Doro-i Gege): Translated as "Princess of a County" or "Princess of the Fourth Rank." This rank was usually granted to the daughters of Princes of the Second Rank (郡王, Jùnwáng)/Princes of the Third Rank (多罗贝勒) with their wife or the daughters of Heirs Apparent of Princes of the First Rank (世子, Shìzǐ) or the daughters of Princes of the First Rank (親王, Qīnwáng) with their concubines. They were also called 多羅格格 (Duōluō Gége) or 郡王格格 (Jùnwáng Gége), meaning "lady of a prince of a commandery." They could be promoted to Junzhu under special circumstances. Their husbands were titled 縣額駙 (Xiàn Éfù).
- Gushan Gege (固山格格): Translated as "Princess of the Fifth Rank." This title was typically given to the daughters of Princes of the Second Rank (郡王, Jùnwáng) with their concubines or Prince of the Fourth Rank(固山贝子) with their wives.
- Gege(格格):"Princess of the Sixth Rank. This title was typically given to the daughters of Prince of the Princes of the Third Rank (多罗贝勒)with their concubines.

There was also 宗女 (Zōngnǚ) which could be used to refer to the daughter of Prince of the Fourth Rank(固山贝子) with their concubines or the daughter of other men from the royal clan, but it was not a princess or noble title just meant that this girl is from the royal clan.
