= Consort Sun =

Consort Sun may refer to:

== China ==
- Princess Sun (fl. 409), wife of Feng Ba (Emperor Wencheng of Northern Yan)
- Noble Consort Cheng Mu (1343–1374), concubine of the Hongwu Emperor
- Empress Sun (c. 1399–1462), wife of the Xuande Emperor

== Korea ==
- Royal Consort Sunbi Heo (1271–1335), wife of Chungseon of Goryeo
- Royal Consort Sunbi No (died 1394), wife of Gongyang of Goryeo
- Deposed Crown Princess Bong (1414–?), wife of Munjong of Joseon before he took the throne

== See also ==
- Lady Sun (fl. 209–211), spouse of Liu Bei before he took the throne
