= Princess Chongning =

Princess Chongning 崇寧公主
- Born: 1364/1365/1366/1367
- Died: After 1384
- Spouse: Niu Cheng
- Father: Hongwu Emperor

Chinese name
- Traditional Chinese: 崇寧公主
- Simplified Chinese: 崇宁公主
Transcriptions
Standard Mandarin
- Hanyu Pinyin: Chóngníng Gōngzhǔ

Princess Chongning (崇寧公主, 1364/1365/1366/1367 – after 1384), personal name unknown, was a princess of the Ming dynasty. She was the third daughter of Hongwu Emperor and Her mother’s identity remains unrecorded.

In November 9, 1384, she was formally conferred the title Princess Chongning and married to Niu Cheng. Shortly after their union, Niu Cheng was convicted of a crime and sentenced to military exile at Jinchi Garrison in Yunnan. The princess chose to accompany him on the journey but passed away on the route.

Upon receiving word of her death, Hongwu Emperor ordered Niu Cheng to be sent to Jinchiwei for execution.

== Life ==
Princess Chongning's birth year is not unknown, but based on the birth year of Princess Ningguo (1364) and Princess Huaiqing (1367), the sixth daughter of the Hongwu Emperor, there are only four years in which the princess could have been born, which are 1364,1365,1366, and 1367. During the 1360s, Zhu Yuanzhang, based in Nanjing, emerged as the principal leader of the Red Turban Rebellion, an uprising aimed at overthrowing the Mongol-led Yuan dynasty and restoring Han Chinese sovereignty. Through a series of military campaigns, he secured key territories, dismantled Yuan garrisons, and united various rebel factions under his command. In 1368, he became the founding emperor of the Ming dynasty and ascended the throne as its first emperor.

In late 1384, on the ninth day of the eleventh lunar month, the emperor bestowed upon her the title “Princess Chongning” and arranged her marriage to the commander-in-chief Niu Cheng. but he was exiled for after being convicted of an unknown crime to Yunnan, the princess was not required to go but she chose to follow her husband but died on the way, when the Hongwu Emperor heard of her death he ordered Niu Cheng to be executed.
