= Li Qi (Ming dynasty) =

Ming dynasty person

Li Qi (? -1402, Chinese: 李祺) was originally from Dingyuan County, Fengyang Province (now Dingyuan County, Anhui Province) during the early Ming Dynasty. He was the son of Li Shanchang, a founding general in Ming Dynasty.

== Biography ==
In 1376, Li Qi was selected by Zhu Yuanzhang to be a son-in-law, the Princess Lin'an's husband (Chinese: 临安公主). He received accolades from Emperor Zhu Yuanzhang and was assigned significant responsibilities. In 1390, Li Shanchang was involved in the Hu Weiyong case and subsequently took his own life. Li Qi was rescued from death due to Princess Lin'an and then confined at home. Upon Emperor Huizong's ascension to the throne of the Ming Dynasty, Li Qi was granted clemency and sent to oversee Jiangpu (Chinese: 江浦). When King Zhu Di commanded his forces to breach the city, Li Qi plunged into the water and perished.
