= Asan (Irgen Gioro) =

Asan (Manchu: ᠠᠰᠠᠨ, romanized: Asan; died 1647) was a military commander of the Later Jin and Qing dynasties. A member of the Irgen Gioro clan of the Plain Blue Banner, he was also known as a member of the Muki Gioro (穆奇覺羅) branch because his family had resided for generations at Muki (Manchu: ᠮᡠᡴᡳ, romanized: Muki). During the reign of Hong Taiji, he was appointed as one of the Sixteen Grand Ministers(十六大臣).

== Biography ==
Asan's father, Altasi, joined Nurhaci's forces during the early period of the latter's rise among the Jianzhou Jurchen, bringing with him the population of the "Seven Villages" (七村人口). Asan and his brothers Adahai, Jirhai, and Galai also entered Nurhaci's service at that time. Altasi subsequently married a female cousin of Nurhaci and became an efu (imperial son-in-law, later: Prince Consort) of the Aisin Gioro house. Asan was assigned to serve under Daišan, Nurhaci's second son. Dissatisfied with the lack of recognition he received, he fled to the Ming dynasty together with his brothers and sons. Nurhaci sent his nephew Amin in pursuit, and two of Asan's sons were killed during the chase. Ultimately, only Asan and Adahai succeeded in entering Ming territory. However, Asan soon returned voluntarily. When questioned by Nurhaci about his defection, he replied that his family had submitted in order to win distinction through military service rather than perform menial duties. Nurhaci thereafter retained him as a personal guard. In 1621, Asan distinguished himself during the battle and occupation of Liaoyang and was awarded the hereditary rank of Adaha hafan Second-Class.

During the reign of Hong Taiji, Asan became one of the Sixteen Grand Ministers and assisted the banner prince of the Plain White Banner in handling military and administrative affairs. He also distinguished himself in campaigns against the Mongol Baarin tribe. During the Qing invasion of Joseon in 1636, he led troops in the capture of Uiju. After his brother Adahai was executed for a criminal offense, Asan attempted once again to defect to the Ming, but failed. Hong Taiji nevertheless pardoned him. Over the following decade, Asan served as one of the principal Qing commanders in campaigns against the Ming dynasty, the peasant regimes of Shun (順) and Xi (西), and the Chahar Mongols. He was particularly noted for being among the first to scale the city walls during the Battle of Yongping in 1630 and the assault on Ka Island in 1637. In 1645, he accompanied Prince Dodo in the Qing conquest of Nanjing and participated in the capture of the Hongguang Emperor of Southern Ming.

For his military achievements, Asan was originally granted the title of Third-Class Duke. However, in 1646, he was stripped of his title after unjustly blaming a subordinate on the basis of accusations made by Shaman. The following year he was reinstated as a First-Class Viscount, but died of illness shortly thereafter.

His eldest son, Sehe, inherited his title. Another son, Kūwaja, became an imperial son-in-law by marrying Hong Taiji's sixth daughter. His younger cousin was Arjin, a general and hereditary viscount.
