= Jisi (Irgen Gioro) =

Jisi (Manchu: ᠵᡳᠰᡳ, romanized: Jisi; died 1669) was a Qing official and nobleman of the Irgen Gioro clan of the Plain Blue Banner. He was the son of the general Arjin. Jisi rose to the position of Minister of Works (工部尚書) but was later executed after being implicated as an associate of Oboi.

== Life ==
In 1658, following the death of his father Arjin, Jisi inherited the hereditary title of First-Class Viscount. He subsequently served as Commander of the Plain Blue Banner Manchu Corps (正藍旗満洲都統). In 1668, with the support of the powerful regent Oboi, Jisi was appointed Minister of Works. In 1669, after Oboi was removed from power by the Kangxi Emperor, Jisi was identified as a member of Oboi's political faction. He was accused of having privately deliberated and decided matters of state together with Oboi's younger brother Murima, the imperial clansman Bamburšan, and more than ten other associates before formally implementing government policies. As a result, Jisi was sentenced to immediate execution by decapitation and put to death.

After Jisi's death, the hereditary title of First-Class Viscount passed to his nephew Zhuolin (卓林).
