= Arjin (Irgen Gioro) =

Arjin (Manchu: ᠠᡵᠵᡳᠨ, romanized: Arjin; died 1658) was a Manchu military commander of the Irgen Gioro clan of the Plain Blue Banner (Also known as Muki Gioro due to the fact that his family had resided for generations at Muki (Manchu: Manchu: ᠮᡠᡴᡳ, romanized: Muki). His father, Cimata, gained prominence after following his elder brother Altasi in joining Nurhaci's military campaign during the early rise of the Jianzhou Jurchen state. Together they brought the population of the "Seven Villages" (七村人口) under Nurhaci's authority and were subsequently entrusted with important responsibilities.

== Biography ==
Arjin accompanied Hong Taiji on a number of military campaigns and took part in battles at Yongping, Luanzhou, and Qian'an. He also distinguished himself during the campaigns against the Chahar Mongols. During the Qing invasion of Joseon in 1636, when Qing forces besieged King Injo at Namhansanseong, Arjin commanded an elite Manchu force in pursuit of Joseon troops. He defeated a Joseon reinforcement army that had been assigned to break the siege.

After the Qing armies entered China proper in 1644, Arjin participated in the Battle of Shanhai Pass and contributed to the defeat of the forces of Li Zicheng. During the following decade, he commanded major Qing forces in campaigns across China, pursuing and suppressing the forces of Li Zicheng, Zhang Xianzhong, and the remaining loyalists of the Southern Ming. In 1651, Arjin was promoted to the hereditary title of First-Class Viscount. In 1655, he was appointed General-in-Chief of Pacifying the South and Suppressing Bandits (寧南靖寇大將軍) and led Qing forces into Hubei. Arjin died of illness in 1658. He received the posthumous name Duanguo (端果, Upright and Resolute). His son Jisi inherited his title.

His older cousin Asan was one of the Sixteen Grand Ministers(十六大臣) and also held the hereditary title of First-Class Viscount.
