= Princess Shou'en =

Qing dynasty princess (1830–1859)

Princess Shou'en of the First Rank
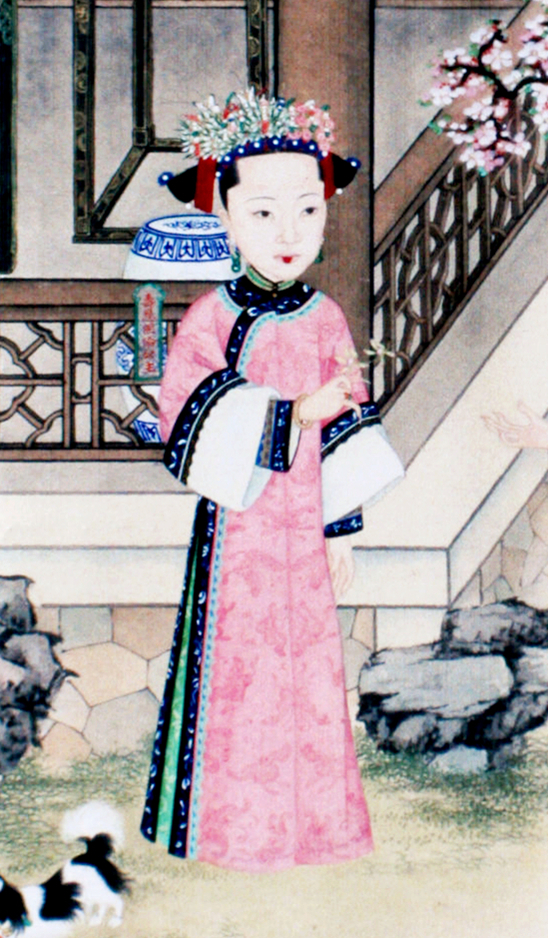
- Born: January 20, 1831
- Died: May 15, 1859 (aged 28)
- Spouse: Jingshou (景壽)
- House: Aisin Gioro
- Father: Emperor Daoguang
- Mother: Empress Xiaojingcheng

Princess Shou'en of the First Rank (Chinese: 壽恩固倫公主; January 20, 1831 – May 15, 1859), personal name unknown, was a princess of the Qing dynasty of China. She was the sixth daughter of the Daoguang Emperor by Empress Xiaojingcheng. Initially a princess of the second rank, but she was later granted the title of princess of the first rank.

She was married to Jingshou, a member of the Manchu elite.

== Early life ==
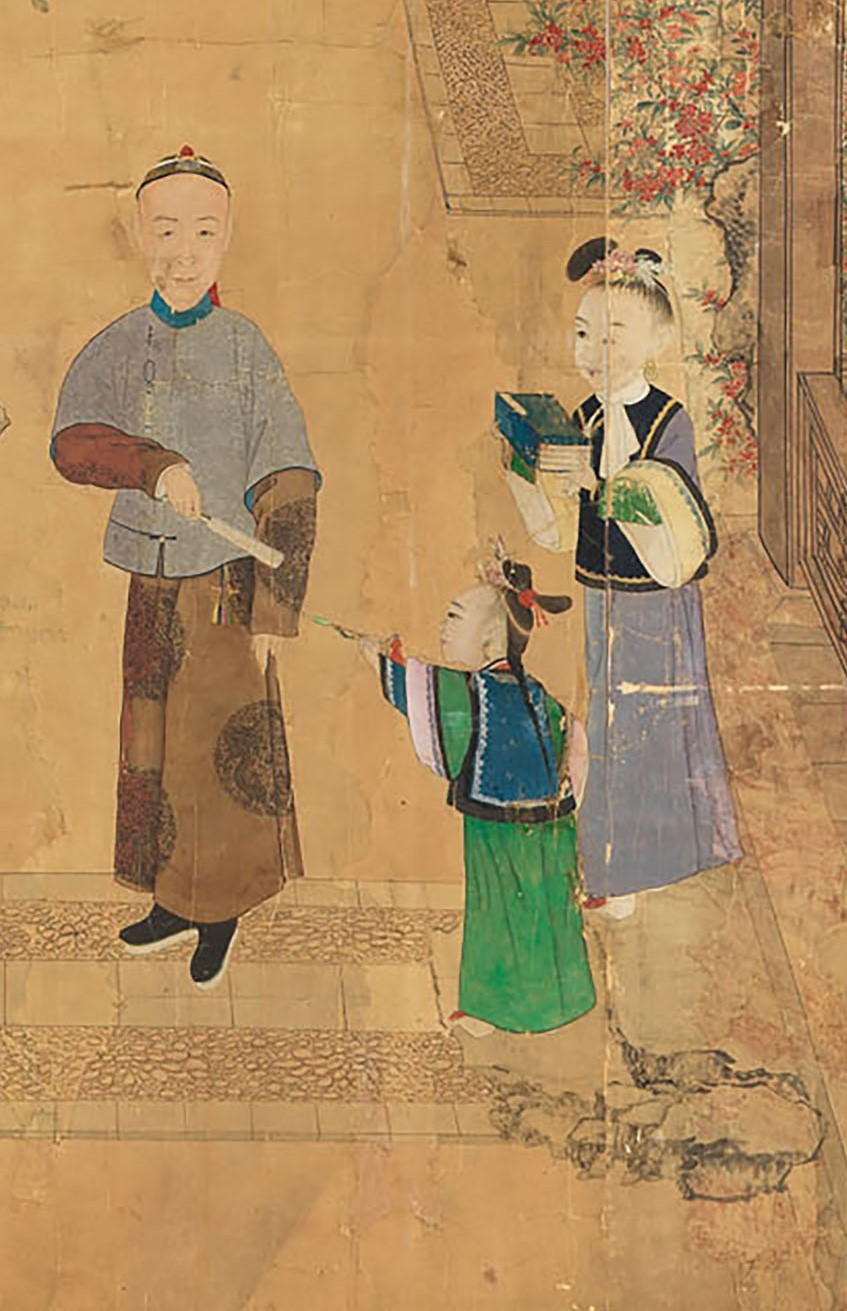
Princess Shou'en playing with Yixin and a palace maid holding books

Princess Shou'en Gurun was born on January 20, 1831 (or December 7, 1830 in the lunar calendar) as the sixth daughter of Emperor Daoguang, and only daughter of her mother, Consort Jing of the Borjigit clan. Initially, she held the title of Heshuo Princess until 1844, when she was granted the higher title of Shou'en Gurun Princess.

== Married life ==
In 1845, she officially married Jingshou, whose family belonged to the Bordered Yellow Banner of the Manchu Eight Banners. After marriage, Jing Shou was granted an official position, and later inherited the rank of First Class Duke due to his elder brother's passing without heirs. The imperial court allocated an annual silver stipend to the princess instead of direct property management to simplify financial matters.

Despite her elevated status, Princess Shou'en's marriage and financial privileges were inferior to those of her elder sister, Princess Shou'an. She received a dowry of silver, real estate, and an apothecary with a substantial capital.

During the reign of Emperor Xianfeng, she and her sister offered silver to support military expenses, but their brother, the emperor, declined, citing the need to maintain their household.

== Death ==
In April 1859, Princess Shou'en died at the age of 30 (though some historical records mistakenly list her age as 38). Upon her death, her husband returned her estate as per regulations. Records show that many of her household servants were elderly or ill, prompting an investigation to verify their health conditions.

Jing Shou had at least four sons and six daughters, one of whom married the eldest daughter of Prince Gong. However, no historical evidence suggests that Princess Shou'en was the biological mother of any of his children.
