= Mei Yin =

Chinese prince consort (d. 1405)

Mei Yin 梅殷
- Commandant-escort
- Died: 1405; Nanjing
- Spouse: Princess Ningguo (m. 1378)
- Issue: Mei Shunchang; Mei Jingfu; Mei Yongzhen
Posthumous name
- Rongding (Note: Simplified Chinese: 荣定; traditional Chinese: 榮定; pinyin: Róngdìng)

Chinese name
- Chinese: 梅殷
Transcriptions
Standard Mandarin
- Hanyu Pinyin: Méi Yīn

Mei Yin (Note: Courtesy name: Boyin (Chinese: 伯殷; pinyin: Bó Yīn)) (died 1405) was the son-in-law of the Hongwu Emperor, the founding emperor of the Ming dynasty of China. In 1378, the Hongwu Emperor arranged for his second daughter, Princess Ningguo, to marry Mei Yin. Among his sons-in-law, the Hongwu Emperor held Mei in particularly high regard and entrusted him with assisting his grandson and successor, the Jianwen Emperor. When Mei Yin's brother-in-law Zhu Di, Prince of Yan, launched a rebellion against the Jianwen Emperor, the Emperor ordered Mei to defend Huai'an against the advancing rebel forces and refused to allow them passage through the city on their way to Nanjing. After Zhu Di seized the throne, Mei fell out of imperial favor due to his loyalty to the Jianwen Emperor. In 1405, while on his way to the imperial palace, Mei was pushed from a bridge in Nanjing by two officers and drowned. Afterwards, they falsely reported that Mei had committed suicide.

== Marriage and early career ==
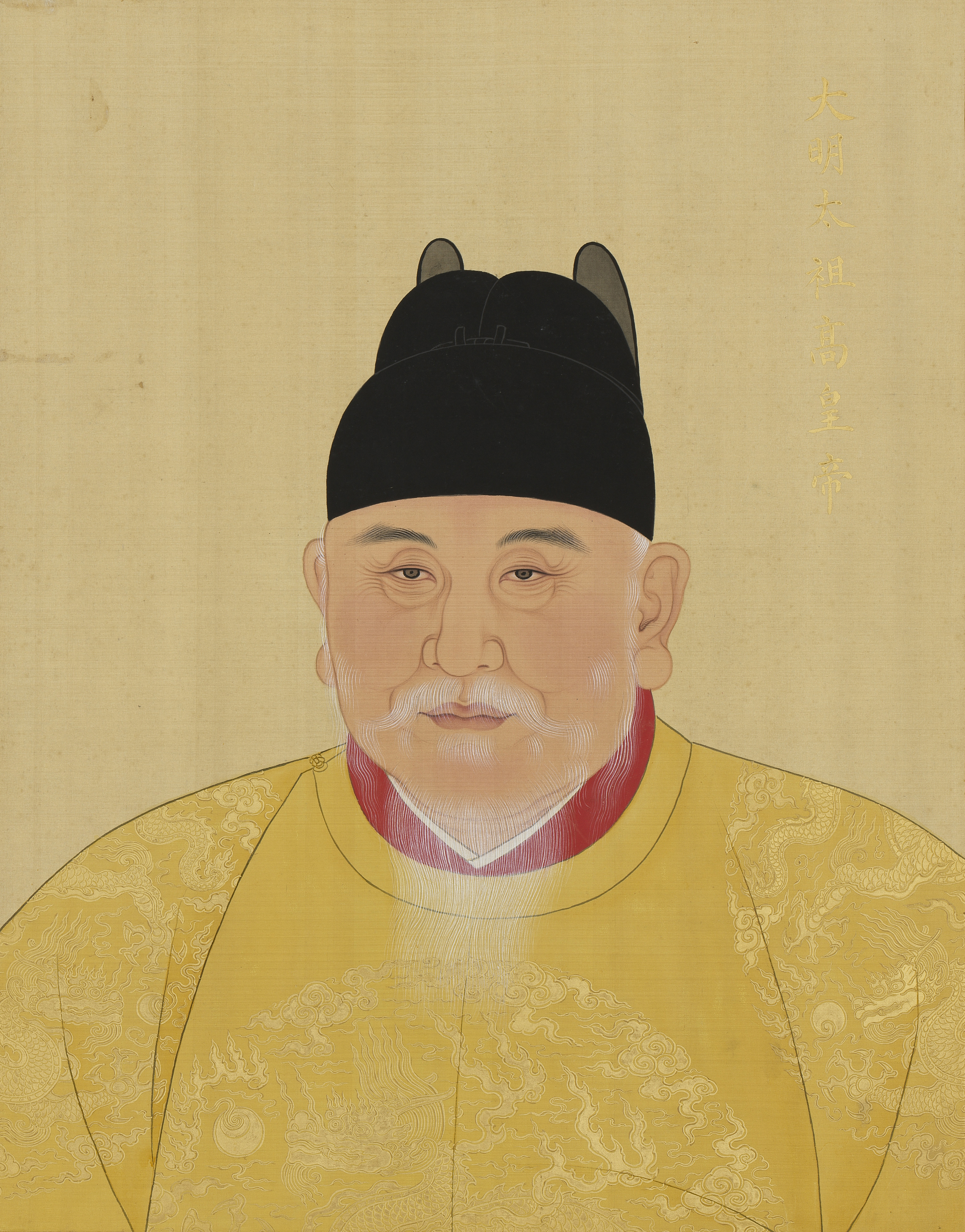
The Hongwu Emperor, the father-in-law of Mei Yin, in his old age, c. 1397

Little is known about Mei Yin's early life. He was the nephew of Mei Sizu (梅思祖), Marquis of Runan, one of the founding generals of China's Ming dynasty. In 1378, Mei married Princess Ningguo, the second daughter of the Hongwu Emperor. He was granted the title of commandant-escort (駙馬都尉). Among his sixteen sons-in-law, the Hongwu Emperor highly favored Mei. He was appointed provincial educational commissioner of Shandong. The Emperor issued an edict praising Mei's knowledge of the Confucian classics and history, which earned him considerable respect among court officials. Mei Yin and Princess Ningguo had three sons: Mei Shunchang (梅順昌), Mei Jingfu (梅景福), and Mei Yongzhen (梅永貞).

In 1379, Mei's annual stipend was set at 600 dan of grain. He was further granted a residence and 2,000 dan of land revenues from Jiangxi in 1382. In November 1384, he was dispatched to Beiping (present-day Beijing) to oversee disaster relief efforts following severe flooding. In 1395, he was assigned to inspect the troops stationed at the Ming central Fengyang.

== Civil war ==
Map showing the Jingnan campaign, with the location of Huai'an, where Mei was stationed, marked.

During the later years of the Hongwu Emperor's reign, his sons, who had been appointed as princes (王; wang) and granted military authority over their own fiefs, became an increasingly serious political concern. The Emperor entrusted Mei with supporting his grandson and designated heir, Zhu Yunwen. After the Hongwu Emperor's death in 1398, Zhu Yunwen ascended the throne as the Jianwen Emperor. The new ruler sought to weaken the power of the feudal princes through his policy of "reducing the feudatories", which provoked a rebellion in August 1399 led by his uncle Zhu Di, Prince of Yan. Princess Ningguo was Zhu Di's younger sister and was also one of his favored siblings. In December 1401, the Jianwen Emperor ordered Mei Yin to defend Huai'an, where he enforced strict military discipline and implemented rigorous defensive measures against the Yan forces.

In May 1402, Zhu Di decisively defeated the Jianwen Emperor's forces and captured several imperial generals. He then requested Mei Yin to allow his forces passage through Huai'an, but Mei refused. He ordered that Zhu Di's envoy have his nose and ears cut off. Zhu Di therefore bypassed the city and marched through Yangzhou on his way to Nanjing.

On 13 July 1402, Zhu Di captured Nanjing, during which the Jianwen Emperor disappeared. Four days later, Zhu Di ascended the throne as the Yongle Emperor. At that time, Mei Yin continued to command a large army stationed along the Huai River, and refused to accept orders from the new regime. The Yongle Emperor pressured Princess Ningguo to write a letter urging her husband to surrender. Upon reading the letter sealed with the princess's own blood, Mei wept bitterly and proceeded to Nanjing. As Mei remained loyal to the former regime and was unwilling to fully submit to the new regime, the Yongle Emperor secretly directed his close associates to seek an opportunity to implicate him.

== Death ==
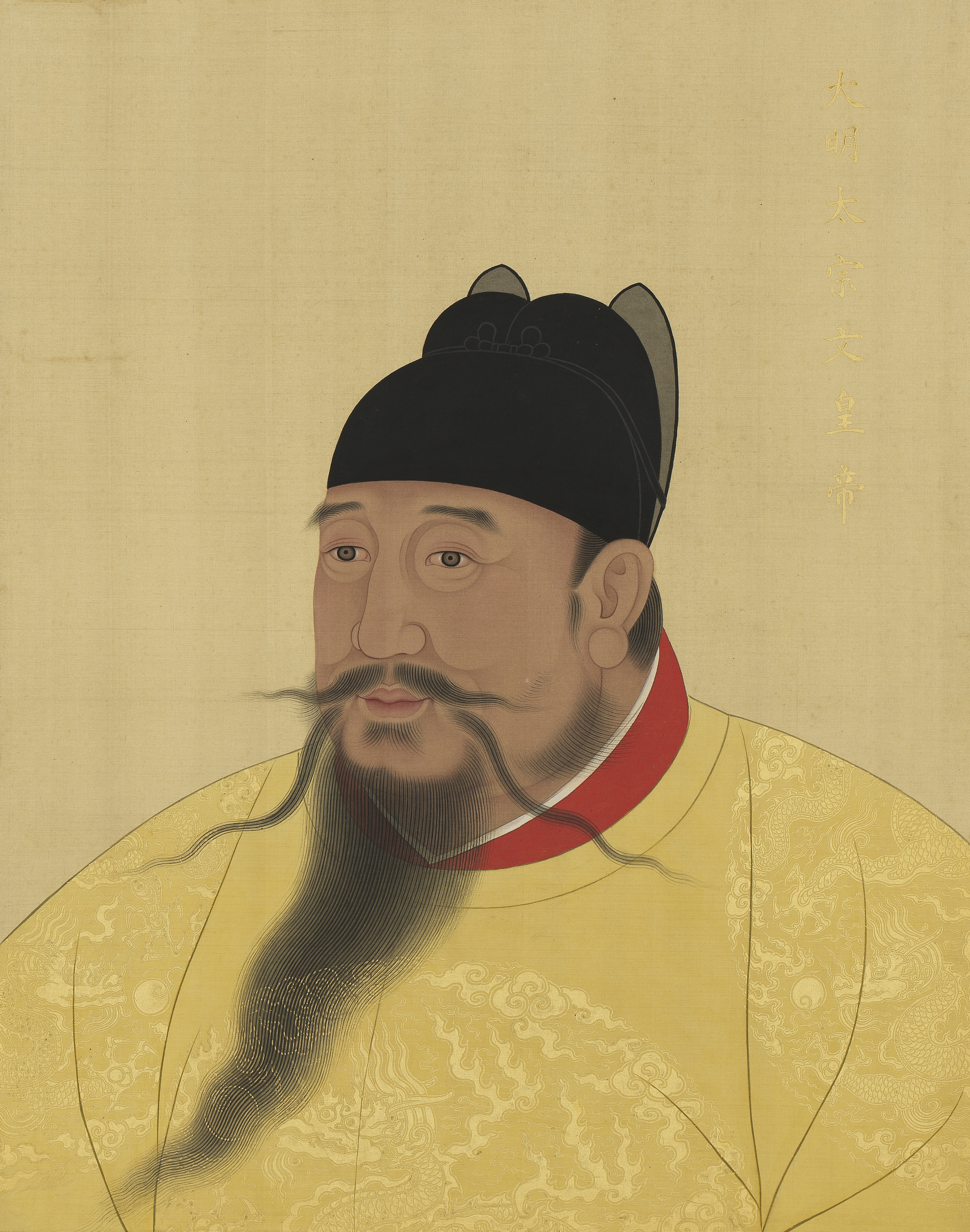
A Ming dynasty portrait of the Yongle Emperor, Mei's brother-in-law who was suspected of being behind his death.

In 1404, Censor-in-Chief Chen Ying (陳瑛) accused Mei of sheltering fugitives and engaging in witchcraft. The Yongle Emperor then instructed the Ministry of Revenue to review the quotas of attendants and guards allocated to dukes, marquises, prince consorts, and barons. He also ordered the Embroidered Uniform Guard to escort Mei's family to Liaodong.

In October 1405, while Mei Yin was crossing a bridge on way to the capital, two junior military commanders, Tan Shen (譚深) and Zhao Xi (趙曦), pushed him into the river and he drowned. Although Tan and Zhao initially reported that Mei had taken his own life, the official Xu Cheng (許成) later revealed that Mei had been killed in an attack. The Yongle Emperor ordered the execution of Tan and Zhao, confiscated their families' properties, and dispatched officials to supervise Mei's funeral. Mei was granted the posthumous name "Rongding".

Mei Yin's sons, Mei Shunchang and Mei Jingfu, were also granted military appointments. After Mei Yin's drowning, Princess Ningguo was deeply grieved and remained a widow for the rest of her life. She never forgave her brother for Mei Yin's death during the thirty years that followed, until her own death.
