= Noble Consort Chengmu =

Ming dynasty imperial consort (1343–1374)

Noble Consort Sun 孫貴妃
- Born: 1343; Chen Prefecture, Huaiyang County, Henan, China
- Died: 1374 (aged 30–31); China
- Burial: Xiaoling Mausoleum, Nanjing
- Spouse: Hongwu Emperor
- Issue: Princess Lin'an; Princess Huaiqing; Tenth daughter Thirteenth daughter
Posthumous name
- Noble Consort Chengmu (成穆貴妃)
- Clan: Sun (孫)
- Father: Sun Heqing (孫和卿)
- Mother: Lady Chao (晁氏)

Noble Consort Chengmu (simplified Chinese: 成穆贵妃孙氏; traditional Chinese: 成穆貴妃孫氏, 1343–1374) of the Sun clan, was an imperial consort of the Ming dynasty. She was a concubine of Emperor Hongwu (Zhu Yuanzhang), the first ruler of the Ming dynasty.

== Life ==
Her personal name was not recorded in history.

Lady Sun's father, Sun Heqing, was an official of the Yuan dynasty. Sun Heqing moved from Chen Prefecture to Changzhou together with his wife and children. Lady Sun had two older brothers: Sun Dashi (孙大石) and Sun Fan (孫藩). Both of her parents died during the war in the late Yuan dynasty. She was adopted by Marshal Ma Shixiong (馬世熊)

At the age of 18, because of her outstanding beauty, Sun was accepted as a concubine by Zhu Yuanzhang, who was still fighting in the Red Turban Rebellions. In 1360, she gave birth to Zhu Yuanzhang's first daughter, named Zhu Jingjing. In 1366, she gave birth to his sixth daughter, named Zhu Funing .

After Zhu Yuanzhang ascended the throne and established the Ming dynasty, Lady Sun was given the rank of Noble Consort (貴妃). As a noble consort, she gave birth to two more daughters, who did not survive to adulthood.

In addition to her beauty, Concubine Sun was good at etiquette, behaved well, and assisted Empress Ma in managing the harem. Empress Ma also praised Noble Consort Sun to Zhu Yuanzhang as a rare virtuous woman.

Noble Consort Sun died in the 9th month of the seventh year of Hongwu (1374) and was given the posthumous title of Noble Consort Chengmu (成穆貴妃) at the age of thirty-two. Later, she was buried in Xiaoling Mausoleum.

== Titles ==
- During the reign of the Emperor Shun of Yuan (r. 1333–1368):
  - Lady Sun (孫氏; from 1343)
  - Concubine (from 1360)
- During the reign of the Hongwu Emperor (r. 1368–1398):
  - Noble Consort (貴妃; from 1368)
  - Noble Consort Chengmu (成穆貴妃; from 1374)

== Issue ==
As Concubine:

- Princess Lin'an (臨安公主; 1360 – 17 August 1421), personal name Jingjing (鏡靜), the Hongwu Emperor's first daughter
- Princess Huaiqing (懷慶公主; 1366 – 15 July 1425), personal name Funing, the Hongwu Emperor's sixth daughter.

As Noble Consort:

- The Hongwu Emperor's tenth daughter
- The Hongwu Emperor's thirteenth daughter
