= Chen Prefecture (Henan) =

Prefecture of imperial China

Chenzhou or Chen Prefecture (陳州) was a zhou (prefecture) in imperial China seated in modern Huaiyang County, Henan, China. It existed (intermittently) from the 6th century to 1913.

Between 1734 and 1913 during the Qing dynasty it was known as Chenzhou Prefecture (陳州府).

== Geography ==
The administrative region of Chenzhou in the Tang dynasty is under the administration of modern Zhoukou in eastern Henan:

- Huaiyang County
- Zhoukou
- Xiangcheng City
- Shangshui County
- Taikang County
- Xihua County
- Shenqiu County
