= Empress Xiaojingcheng =

Chinese empress dowager (1812–1855)

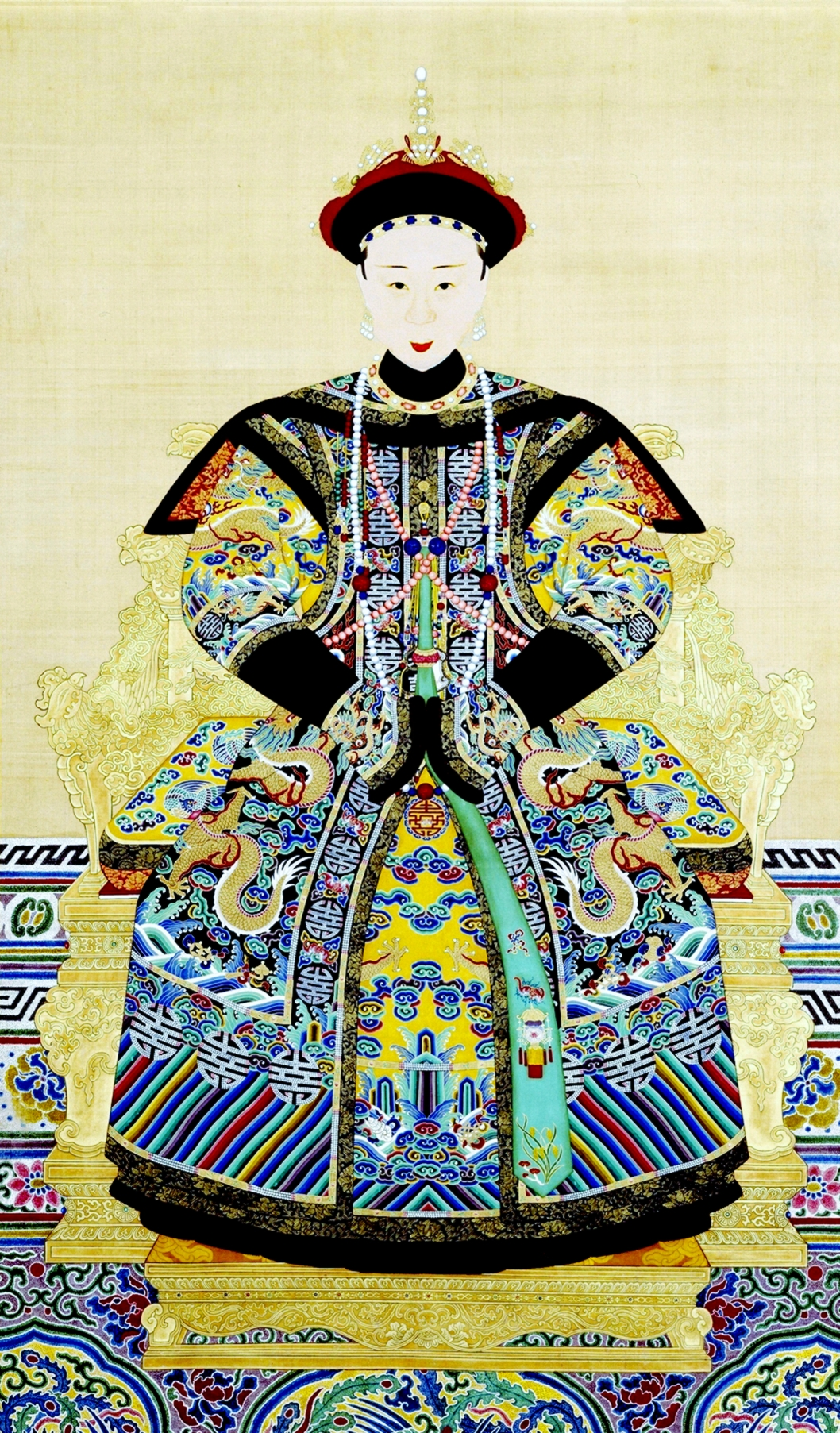
- Qing dynasty portrait of Empress Xiaojingcheng

Empress dowager of the Qing dynasty
- Tenure: 13 – 21 August 1855
- Predecessor: Empress Dowager Gongci
- Successor: Empress Dowager Ci'an
- Born: 19 June 1812 (嘉慶十七年 五月 十一日)
- Died: 21 August 1855 (aged 43) (咸豐五年 七月 九日); Shoukang Palace, Elegant Spring Garden, Old Summer Palace, Beijing, Qing China
- Burial: Mu Mausoleum, Western Qing tombs
- Spouse: Daoguang Emperor (m. 1825; died 1850)
- Issue: Yigang; Yiji; Princess Shou'en of the First Rank; Yixin, Prince Gongzhong of the First Rank
Posthumous name
- Empress Xiaojing Kangci Yizhao Duanhui Zhuangren Heshen Bitian Fusheng Cheng (孝靜康慈懿昭端惠莊仁和慎弼天撫聖成皇后)
- House: Borjigit (博爾濟吉特)
- Father: Hualiang'a (花良阿)
- Mother: Lady Aisin Gioro

Empress Xiaojingcheng

Chinese name
- Traditional Chinese: 孝靜成皇后
- Simplified Chinese: 孝静成皇后
Transcriptions
Standard Mandarin
- Hanyu Pinyin: Xiàojìngchéng Huánghòu

Manchu name
- Manchu script: ᡥᡳᠶᠣᠣᡧᡠᠩᡤᠠ ᠴᡳᠪᠰᡝᠨ ᡧᠠᠩᡤᠠᠨ ᡥᡡᠸᠠᠩᡥᡝᠣ
- Romanization: hiyoošungga cibsen šanggan hūwangheo

Empress Xiaojingcheng (19 June 1812 – 21 August 1855) was a consort of the Daoguang Emperor of China's Qing dynasty. She was honoured as Empress Dowager Kangci (Chinese: 康慈皇太后) during the reign of her step-son, the Xianfeng Emperor. She was the only Qing empress dowager who was neither her husband's empress consort nor the reigning emperor's mother.

== Life ==
=== Family background ===
Empress Xiaojingcheng's personal name was not recorded in history. She was a Khorchin Mongol of the Plain Blue Banner by birth.

- Father: Hualiang'a (花良阿), served as a fifth rank literary official (員外郎) in the Ministry of Justice, and held the title of a first class duke (一等公)
  - Paternal grandfather: Kunshan (崑山)
- Mother: Lady Aisin Gioro
  - Maternal grandfather: Yongxi (永錫; d. 1821), held the title Prince Su of the First Rank from 1778 to 1821, Hooge's great-great-grandson
  - Maternal grandmother: Lady Namdulu (那木都鲁氏), Yongxi's primary consort
- One brother
- One sister

=== Jiaqing era ===
The future Empress Xiaojingcheng was born on the 11th day of the fifth lunar month in the 17th year of the reign of the Jiaqing Emperor, which translates to 19 June 1812 in the Gregorian calendar.

=== Daoguang era ===
In 1825, Lady Borjigit entered the Forbidden City and was granted the title "Noble Lady Jing" by the Daoguang Emperor. On 22 November 1826, she gave birth to the emperor's second son, Yigang, who would die prematurely on 5 March 1827.

Noble Lady Jing was elevated on 29 December 1826 to "Concubine Jing", and on 15 May 1827 to "Consort Jing". She gave birth on 2 December 1829 to the emperor's third son, Yiji, who would die prematurely on 22 January 1830, on 20 January 1831 to his sixth daughter, Princess Shou'en of the First Rank, and on 11 January 1833 to his sixth son, Yixin. On 17 September 1834, she was elevated to "Noble Consort Jing".

The Daoguang Emperor's second empress consort, Empress Xiaoquancheng, died on 13 February 1840, and Noble Consort Jing was placed in charge of the emperor's harem. On 9 January 1841, she was elevated to "Imperial Noble Consort".

=== Xianfeng era ===
When the Daoguang Emperor died on 26 February 1850, his fourth son, Yizhu, who was enthroned as the Xianfeng Emperor, refused to make Lady Borjigit the empress dowager. Instead, the Xianfeng Emperor honoured her with the title "Imperial Noble Consort Dowager Kangci". She and her only surviving son, Yixin, were not satisfied with this arrangement. According to imperial customs, Imperial Noble Consort Dowager Kangci had no right to claim the position of empress dowager because she was neither the birth mother of the Xianfeng Emperor, nor did she hold the rank of Empress while the Daoguang Emperor was still living. Although the Xianfeng Emperor ignored her appeals to become empress dowager, he treated her respectfully like a stepmother.

In 1852, Imperial Noble Consort Dowager Kangci, as the highest ranked living consort of the previous emperor, was allowed to exercise her privilege to select potential candidates to be the Xianfeng Emperor's consorts. Among those she chose were the future Empress Dowager Ci'an and Empress Dowager Cixi.

Imperial Noble Consort Dowager Kangci became seriously ill in August 1855. Fearing that she had little time left, she conspired with her son, Yixin, to earn her the title of empress dowager before she died. Yixin then issued an imperial edict to honor his mother without full consent of the Xianfeng Emperor. In order to save himself from public embarrassment, the Emperor, although being displeased, reluctantly acknowledged the title later.

She became Empress Dowager Kangci on 13 August 1855 and died eight days later. The Xianfeng Emperor appointed two princes, one of whom was Yixin, to take charge of the funeral arrangements, and announced that he would spend the mourning period in the Hall of Mental Cultivation.

In 1857, Empress Dowager Kangci was interred in the Mu Mausoleum of the Western Qing tombs. She was also granted the posthumous title "Empress Xiaojing". The Xianfeng Emperor did not add the character cheng – indicating her status as an empress consort of the Daoguang Emperor, as were Empresses Xiaomucheng, Xiaoshencheng and Xiaoquancheng – to her posthumous title because he wanted to highlight his belief that Empress Dowager Kangci never qualified as an empress consort. He also did not give her a place in the Imperial Ancestral Temple, which meant that she would not be included in ancestral worship rites.

=== Tongzhi era ===
When the Xianfeng Emperor died on 22 August 1861, his first son and successor, the Tongzhi Emperor, was still too young to rule. In the Xinyou Coup that followed, the Empresses Dowager Ci'an and Cixi collaborated with Yixin to overthrow and seize power from a group of eight regents appointed by the Xianfeng Emperor on his deathbed. The two empresses dowager thus became the regents for the Tongzhi Emperor, with Yixin assisting as Prince-Regent. On 6 May 1862, in order to secure Yixin's allegiance towards the Tongzhi Emperor, the two empresses dowager issued an imperial decree that added the character cheng to Empress Dowager Kangci's posthumous title. Empress Dowager Kangci was also given a place in the Imperial Ancestral Temple and included in ancestral worship rites.

== Titles ==
- During the reign of the Jiaqing Emperor (r. 1796–1820):
  - Lady Borjigit (博爾濟吉特氏; from 19 June 1812)
- During the reign of the Daoguang Emperor (r. 1820–1850):
  - Noble Lady Jing (靜貴人; from 1825), sixth rank consort
  - Imperial Concubine Jing (靜嬪; from 29 December 1826), fifth rank consort
  - Consort Jing (靜妃; from 15 May 1827), fourth rank consort
  - Noble Consort Jing (靜貴妃; from 17 September 1834), third rank consort
  - Imperial Noble Consort (皇貴妃; from 9 January 1841), second rank consort
- During the reign of the Xianfeng Emperor (r. 1850–1861):
  - Dowager Imperial Noble Consort Kangci (康慈皇貴太妃; from April 1851)
  - Empress Dowager Kangci (康慈皇太后; from 13 August 1855)
  - Empress Xiao Jing (孝靜皇后; from 20 September 1855)
- During the reign of the Tongzhi Emperor (r. 1861–1875):
  - Empress Xiao Jing Cheng (孝靜成皇后; from 6 May 1862)

== Issue ==
- As Noble Lady Jing:
  - Yigang (奕綱; 22 November 1826 – 5 March 1827), the Daoguang Emperor's second son
- As Consort Jing:
  - Miscarriage at four months (28 June 1828)
  - Yiji (奕繼; 2 December 1829 – 22 January 1830), the Daoguang Emperor's third son
  - Princess Shou'en of the First Rank (壽恩固倫公主; 20 January 1831 – 15 May 1859), the Daoguang Emperor's sixth daughter
    - Married Jingshou (景壽; 1829–1889) of the Manchu Fuca clan in May/June 1845
  - Yixin (奕䜣; 11 January 1833 – 29 May 1898), the Daoguang Emperor's sixth son, granted the title Prince Gong of the First Rank in 1850, posthumously honoured as Prince Gongzhong of the First Rank

== Gallery ==
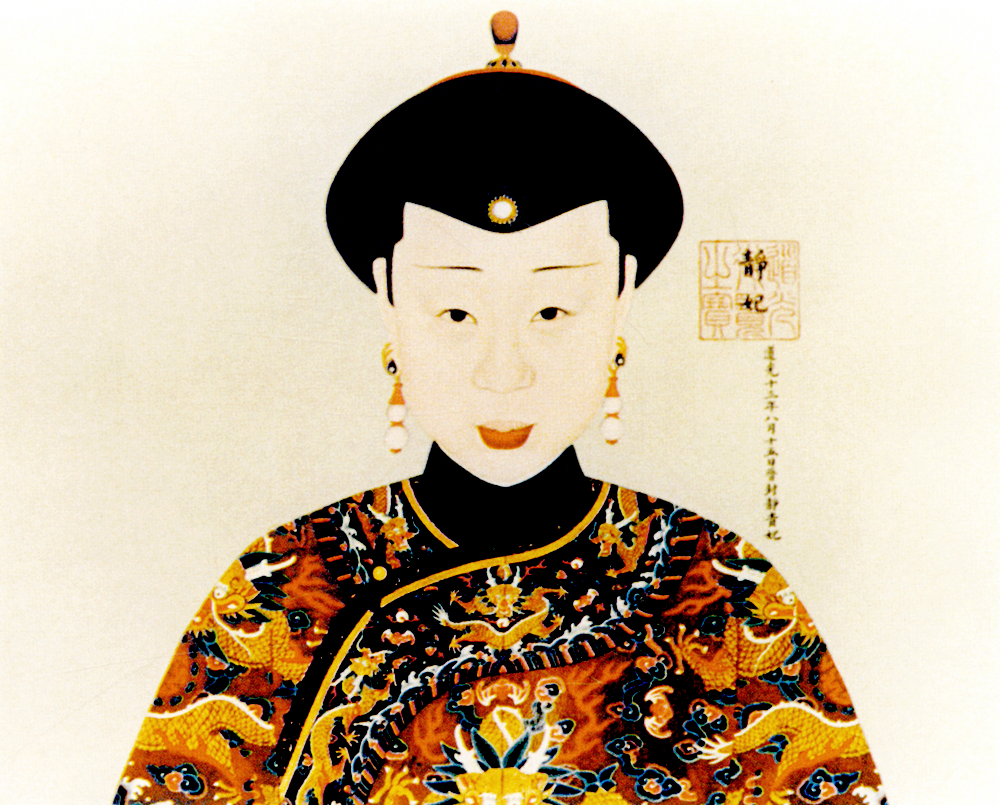
In ceremonial dress

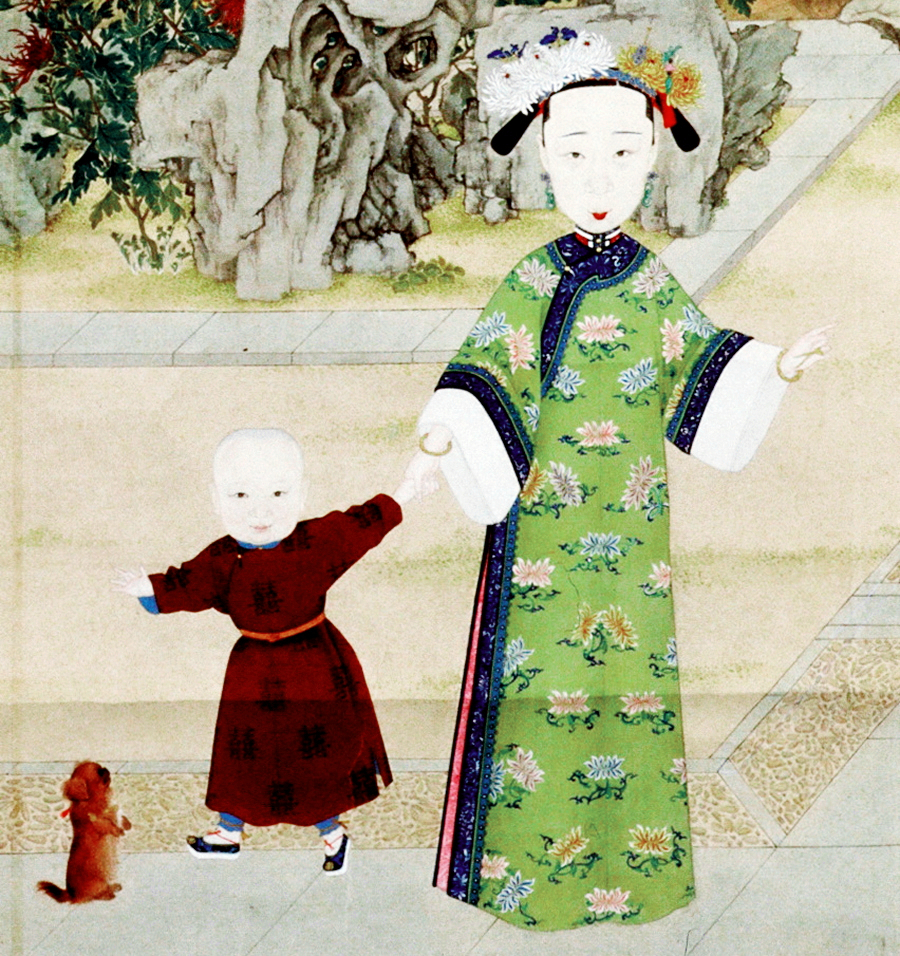
In daily dress, with Yixin

== In fiction and popular culture ==
- Portrayed by Wan Suet-kei in The Rise and Fall of Qing Dynasty (1988)
- Portrayed by Alice Fung So-bor in The Rise and Fall of Qing Dynasty (1990)
- Portrayed by Nancy Wu in Curse of the Royal Harem (2011)

== See also ==
- Ranks of imperial consorts in China § Qing
- Royal and noble ranks of the Qing dynasty

== Notes ==
Empress Xiaojingcheng Borjigin Clan
Chinese royalty
Preceded by Empress Dowager Gongci (Xiaoherui) of the Niohuru clan	Empress dowager of China; 13 – 21 August 1855	Succeeded by Empress Dowager Ci'an (Xiaozhenxian) of the Niohuru clan ----------- Xingzhen, Empress Dowager Cixi (Xiaoqinxian) of the Yehe-Nara clan
