= Princess =

Regal rank and the feminine equivalent of prince

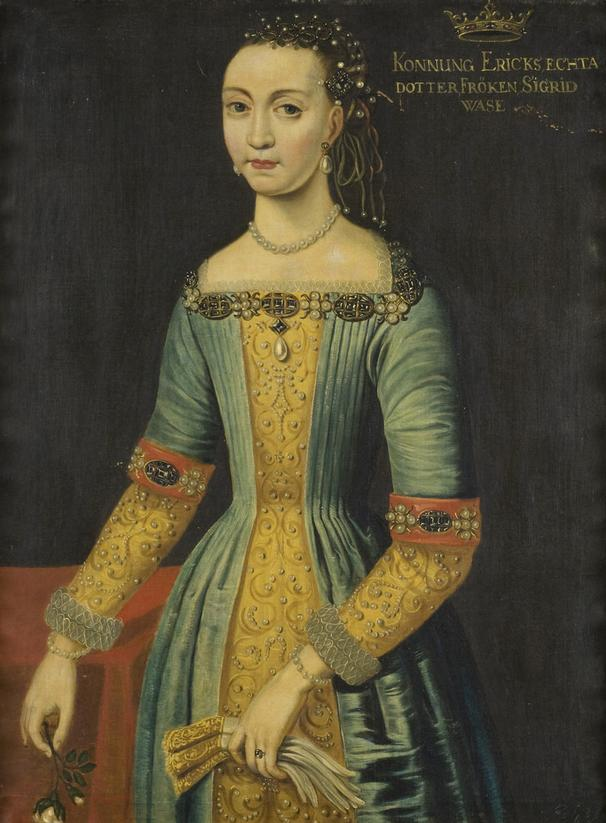
Princess Sigrid Vasa of Sweden (1566–1633)

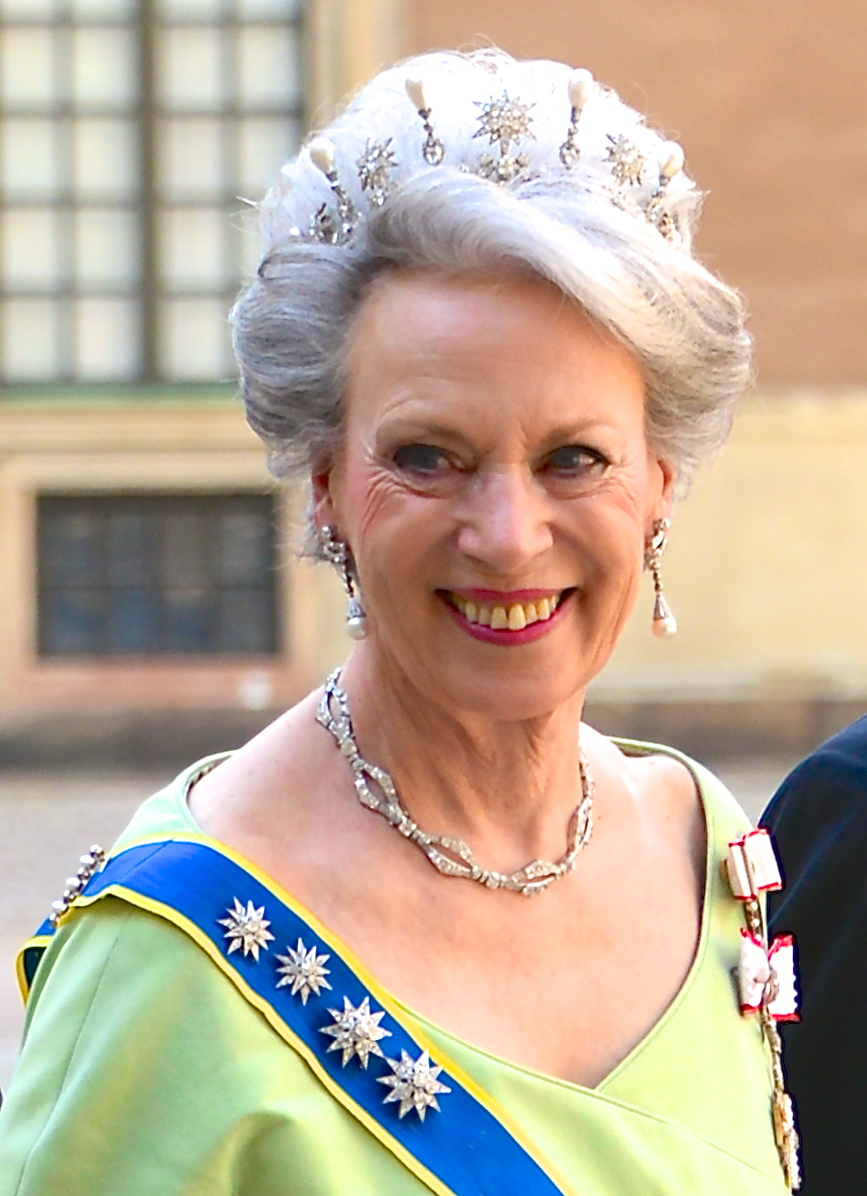
Princess Benedikte of Denmark wearing insignia of the Order of the Polar Star (Sweden) and various Danish orders' insignia while in Stockholm, 2013

Princess is a title used by a female member of a regnant monarch's family or by a female ruler of a principality. The male equivalent is a prince (from Latin princeps, meaning principal citizen). Most often, the term has been used for the consort of a prince, or for the daughter of a monarch. A crown princess can be the heir apparent to the throne or the spouse of the heir apparent.

== Princess as a substantive title ==
Some princesses are reigning monarchs of principalities. There have been fewer instances of reigning princesses than reigning princes, as most principalities excluded women from inheriting the throne. An example of a princess regnant is Constance of Antioch, princess regnant of Antioch in the 12th century. Since the president of France, an office for which women are eligible, is ex-officio a co-prince of Andorra, then Andorra could theoretically be jointly ruled by a princess.

== Princess as a courtesy title ==
=== Descendants of monarchs ===
For many centuries, the title "princess" was not regularly used for a monarch's daughter, who, in English, might simply be called "Lady". Old English had no female equivalent of "prince", "earl", or any other royal or noble title aside from queen. Royal women were simply addressed or referred to as "The Lady [Firstname]". For example, Mary and Elizabeth, daughters of Henry VIII of England, were often simply referred to as "the Ladies Mary and Elizabeth". This practice, however, was not consistent. In the marriage contract between Prince George of Denmark and Anne, daughter of James II of England, Anne is referred to as "The Princess Anne".

Practice in Britain began to change in the 18th century. After the accession of King George I to the British throne, the children, grandchildren, and male-line great-grandchildren of the British sovereign were automatically titled "Prince or Princess of Great Britain and Ireland" and styled "Royal Highness" (in the case of children and grandchildren) or "Highness" (in the case of male line great-grandchildren). Queen Victoria confirmed this practice in letters patent dated 30 January 1864 (the first Act of the Prerogative dealing with the princely title in general terms). On 31 December 2012, Queen Elizabeth II issued letters patent enabling all children of the eldest son of the Prince of Wales to enjoy the princely title and style of "Royal Highness", as opposed to only the eldest son.

=== Wives of princes ===
In European countries, a woman who marries a prince will almost always become a princess, but a man who marries a princess will almost never become a prince, unless specifically created so. From 1301 onward, the eldest sons of the kings of England (and later Great Britain and the United Kingdom) have generally been created Prince of Wales and Earl of Chester, and their wives have been titled Princess of Wales.

Queen Elizabeth II issued letters patent dated 21 August 1996, stating that any woman divorced from a Prince of the United Kingdom would no longer be entitled to the style "Royal Highness". This has so far applied to Diana, Princess of Wales, and Sarah, Duchess of York. Similarly, in Denmark, Alexandra, Countess of Frederiksborg, lost her status as princess upon her second marriage after divorcing Prince Joachim of Denmark (Danish: Grevinde af Frederiksborg).

== As term of endearment ==
In some cases, "princess" is used as a term of endearment to express love for a woman. For example, throughout the 1997 film Life Is Beautiful the protagonist Guido calls his beloved Dora "principessa", Italian for "princess".

== See also ==
- British princess
- Indian princess
- List of Chinese princesses
- List of fictional princesses
- Lists of princesses
