= Princess Shou'an =

Qing Dynasty princess (1826–1860)

Gurun Princess Shou'an
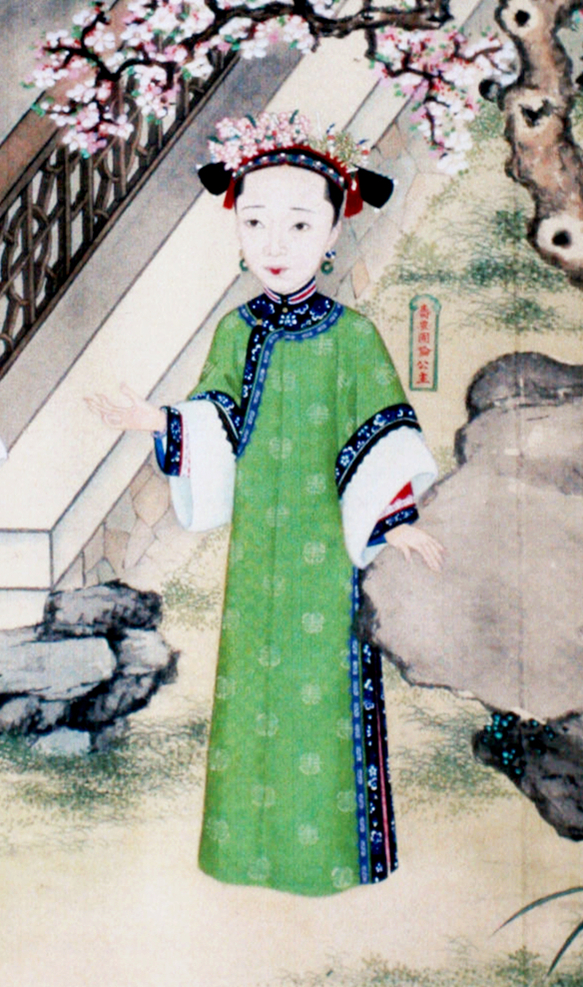
- Born: 12 May 1826
- Died: 24 March 1860 (aged 33)
- Spouse: Demchüghjab, Prince Zhan of the Blood
- House: Aisin Gioro (by birth); Borjigit (by marriage)
- Father: Daoguang Emperor
- Mother: Empress Xiaoquancheng

Princess Shou'an
- Traditional Chinese: 壽安固倫公主
- Simplified Chinese: 寿安固伦公主
Transcriptions
Standard Mandarin
- Hanyu Pinyin: Shòu'ān Gùlún Gōngzhǔ

Gurun Princess Shou'an (12 May 1826 – 24 March 1860) was a princess of the Qing dynasty. She was born to the Daoguang Emperor and Empress Xiaoquancheng.

== Biography ==
Gurun Princess Shou'an was born on the sixth day of the fourth lunar month in the sixth year of the reign of the Daoguang Emperor. She was the fourth daughter of Daoguang and Empress Xiaoquancheng. She had two full siblings – Gurun Princess Duanshun and Yizhu (the future Xianfeng Emperor).

In 1841 she married Demchüghjab (d. 1865) of the Borjigit clan and was granted the title of Gurun Princess Shou'an. She died in the 10th year of the reign of the Xianfeng Emperor. In 1862 Demchüghjab requested permission to move his wife's coffin from Beijing but his request was rejected by the empress dowagers Cixi and Ci'an. Demchüghjab did not remarry and died in 1865.
