= Princess Lin'an =

Chinese princess (1360–1421)

Zhu Jingjing
- Princess Lin'an
- Born: 15 December 1360
- Died: 30 July 1421 (aged 60)
- Burial: Tiexinqiao, Yuhuatai, Nanjing
- Spouse: Li Qi
- Issue: Li Fang; Li Mao
- Father: Hongwu Emperor
- Mother: Noble Consort Chengmu

Chinese name
- Traditional Chinese: 臨安公主
- Simplified Chinese: 临安公主
Transcriptions
Standard Mandarin
- Hanyu Pinyin: Lín'ān Gōngzhǔ

Personal name
- Traditional Chinese: 朱鏡靜
- Simplified Chinese: 朱镜静
Transcriptions
Standard Mandarin
- Hanyu Pinyin: Zhū Jìngjìng

Princess Lin'an (15 December 1360 (Note: The "Epitaph of Princess Lin'an" records that she was born on the 7th day of the 10th month in the Gengzi year. This date corresponds to 15 December 1360 on the Julian calendar.) – 30 July 1421), personal name Zhu Jingjing, (Note: According to the "Epitaph of Princess Lin'an", the princess's personal name was recorded as Zhu Jingjing.) was a princess of the Ming dynasty. She was the eldest daughter of the Hongwu Emperor and Noble Consort Chengmu.

== Biography ==
China in 1360, the year Lin'an was born.

Zhu Jingjing was born on 15 December 1360, as the eldest daughter of Zhu Yuanzhang. Her mother was Zhu Yuanzhang's concubine, Lady Sun (later Noble Consort Chengmu), and she was the full older sister of Princess Huaiqing. At this time, Zhu Yuanzhang was based in Nanjing and had emerged as a leading commander of the Red Turban Rebellion, a movement directed against the Mongol-led Yuan dynasty. The rebellion sought to restore Han Chinese rule after nearly a century of foreign domination. By the 1360s, Zhu Yuanzhang consolidated his conquests, established the Ming dynasty, and proclaimed himself emperor. He is commonly known by his era name as the Hongwu Emperor.

On 26 July 1376, Zhu Jingjing was married to Li Qi, the son of Li Shanchang, Duke of Han, and was granted the title of Princess Lin'an. As this was a time when the marriage protocols for Ming princesses were still being formalized, the ceremony was particularly elaborate: Li Qi first received ceremonial headgear, court robes, and an official commission, followed by a grand procession. Princess Lin'an was praised for her strict observance of the Confucian moral codes expected of imperial women. Li Qi, as the son of a founding statesman and the emperor's eldest son-in-law, enjoyed the Hongwu Emperor's deep trust and was frequently tasked with providing relief in times of flood and drought across the empire.

In 1390, Li Shanchang was implicated in the Hu Weiyong case and executed. Although Li Qi, by virtue of his marriage, was spared from execution, he was stripped of his rank and exiled to Jiangpu (modern Pukou, Nanjing). Princess Lin'an chose to accompany her husband into exile, where he eventually died. (Note: The History of Ming contains conflicting accounts regarding the death of Li Qi. The "Biography of Princess Lin'an" states that Li Qi died before his father, Li Shanchang, was executed in the Hu Weiyong case. However, the "Biography of Li Shanchang" records that Li Qi was still alive when his father was executed for his involvement in the case, subsequently moving with Princess Lin'an to Jiangpu, where he died years later.) Their sons were granted immunity from punishment.

On 30 July 1421, Princess Lin'an died at the age of 60. Her elder brother, the Yongle Emperor, mourned her deeply, suspending court sessions for four days. Her tomb, discovered in May 2018 in Tiexinqiao Subdistrict of Yuhuatai District, Nanjing, was recognized in September 2023 as a municipal-level cultural heritage protection site.
