= Empress Xiaoquancheng =

Empress of China from 1834 to 1840

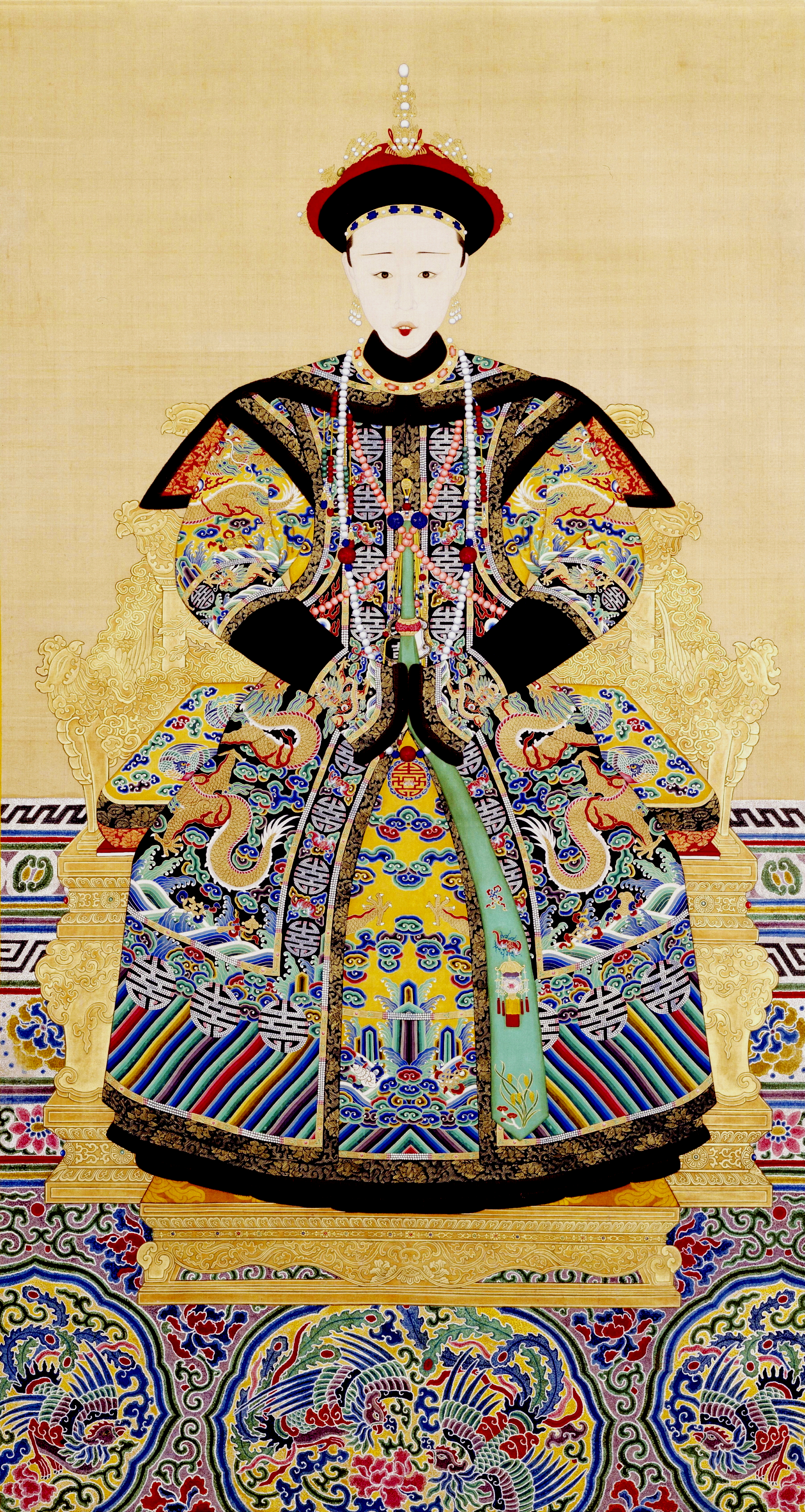
- Qing dynasty portrait of Empress Xiaoquancheng

Empress consort of the Qing dynasty
- Tenure: 18 November 1834 – 13 February 1840
- Predecessor: Empress Xiaoshencheng
- Successor: Empress Xiaozhenxian
- Born: 24 March 1808 (嘉慶十三年 二月 二十八日); Suzhou, Qing China
- Died: 13 February 1840 (aged 31) (道光二十年 正月 十一日); Old Summer Palace, Shuntian Prefecture, Qing China
- Burial: Mu Mausoleum, Western Qing tombs
- Spouse: Daoguang Emperor (m. 1821)
- Issue: Princess Duanshun of the First Rank; Princess Shou'an of the First Rank; Xianfeng Emperor
Posthumous name
- Empress Xiaoquan Cijing Kuanren Duanque Anhui Chengmin Futian Dusheng Cheng (孝全慈敬寬仁端愨安惠誠敏符天篤聖成皇后)
- House: Niohuru (鈕祜祿)
- Father: Yiling (颐龄)
- Mother: Lady Uya (乌雅)
- Religion: Buddhism

Empress Xiaoquancheng

Chinese name
- Traditional Chinese: 孝全成皇后
- Simplified Chinese: 孝全成皇后
Transcriptions
Standard Mandarin
- Hanyu Pinyin: Xiàoquánchéng Huánghòu

Manchu name
- Manchu script: ᡥᡳᠶᠣᠣᡧᡠᠩᡤᠠ ᡤᡝᠮᡠᠩᡤᡝ ᡧᠠᠩᡤᠠᠨ ᡥᡡᠸᠠᠩᡥᡝᠣ
- Romanization: hiyoošungga gemungge šangga hūwangheo

Empress Xiaoquancheng (24 March 1808 – 13 February 1840), of the Manchu Bordered Yellow Banner Niohuru clan, was the second empress consort of the Daoguang Emperor of the Qing dynasty of China from 1834 until her death in 1840.

== Life ==
=== Family background ===
Empress Xiaoquancheng's personal name was not recorded in history. Her family originally belonged to the Plain Red Banner.

- Father: Yiling (頤齡), served as a first rank military official (駐防將軍) in Suzhou, and held the title of a third class duke (三等公)
  - Paternal grandfather: Mukedengbu (穆克登布; d. 1803)
- Mother: Lady Uya
- One brother: Enxu (恩绪)

=== Jiaqing era ===
The future Empress Xiaoquancheng was born on the 28th day of the second lunar month in the 13th year of the reign of the Jiaqing Emperor, which translates to 24 March 1808 in the Gregorian calendar. She spent her early youth in Suzhou.

=== Daoguang era ===
In 1821, Lady Niohuru attended the Elegant Ladies' Selections and when the Daoguang Emperor first saw her, he fell in love immediately. She entered the Forbidden City and was granted the title "Noble Lady Quan" by the Emperor. She was elevated on 28 December 1822 to "Concubine Quan", and on 26 December 1823 to "Consort Quan". On 8 April 1825, she gave birth to the emperor's third daughter, Princess Duanshun of the First Rank, who would die prematurely on 27 December 1835.

On 30 May 1825, Consort Quan was elevated to "Noble Consort Quan". She gave birth on 12 May 1826 to the emperor's fourth daughter, Princess Shou'an of the First Rank, and on 17 July 1831 to his fourth son, Yizhu. Reports on her pregnancy in 1831 suggest that the bulk of the medical attention she received was during the last five weeks, when a physician and a midwife were in constant attendance to await the onset of labour.

The Daoguang Emperor's first empress consort, Empress Xiaoshencheng, died on 16 June 1833, and Noble Consort Quan was placed in charge of the emperor's harem as the highest rank concubine in that time. On 28 September 1833, during the Mid Autumn Festival, Noble Consort Quan was elevated to "Imperial Noble Consort". On 18 November 1834, she was officially instated as the new empress consort.

The young Empress was greatly favored by the Emperor, and this caused him to often ignore the other palace women. As Empress, it was expected of her to encourage the Emperor to visit multiple women, but she never did this. Lady Niohuru always found excuses to punish the palace women, and her behavior was frowned upon. The only woman who stood a threat to her in the Forbidden City was Empress Xiaojingcheng, who was greatly favored and had given birth to a large amount of imperial children.

The Empress died on 13 February 1840. Her exact cause of death was not recorded in history, and many believe that she was murdered by Empress Xiaoherui, the Empress Dowager during Daoguang's reign, because of her bad behavior and their rocky relationship. On 2 May 1840, she was granted the posthumous title "Empress Xiaoquan". On 20 November 1840, she was interred in the Mu Mausoleum of the Western Qing tombs.

=== Xianfeng era ===
The Daoguang Emperor died on 26 February 1850 and was succeeded by Yizhu, who was enthroned as the Xianfeng Emperor. On 26 October 1850, he honoured his mother with the posthumous title "Empress Xiaoquancheng".

== Titles ==
- During the reign of the Jiaqing Emperor (r. 1796–1820):
  - Lady Niohuru (from 24 March 1808)
- During the reign of the Daoguang Emperor (r. 1820–1850):
  - Noble Lady Quan (全貴人; from 1821), sixth rank consort
  - Imperial Concubine Quan (全嬪; from 28 December 1822), fifth rank consort
  - Consort Quan (全妃; from 26 December 1823), fourth rank consort
  - Noble Consort Quan (全貴妃; from 30 May 1825), third rank consort
  - Imperial Noble Consort (皇貴妃; from 28 September 1833), second rank consort
  - Empress (皇后; from 18 November 1834)
  - Empress Xiaoquan (孝全皇后; from 2 May 1840)
- During the reign of the Xianfeng Emperor (r. 1850–1861):
  - Empress Xiaoquancheng (孝全成皇后; from 26 October 1850)

== Issue ==
- As Consort Quan:
  - Miscarriage (2 January 1824)
  - Princess Duanshun of the First Rank (端順固倫公主; 8 April 1825 – 27 December 1835), the Daoguang Emperor's third daughter
- As Noble Consort Quan:
  - Princess Shou'an of the First Rank (壽安固倫公主; 12 May 1826 – 24 March 1860), the Daoguang Emperor's fourth daughter
    - Married Demchüghjab (德穆楚克扎布; d. 1865) of the Naiman Borjigit clan on 15 November 1841
  - Yizhu (奕詝; 17 July 1831 – 22 August 1861), the Daoguang Emperor's fourth son, enthroned on 9 March 1850 as the Xianfeng Emperor

== Gallery ==
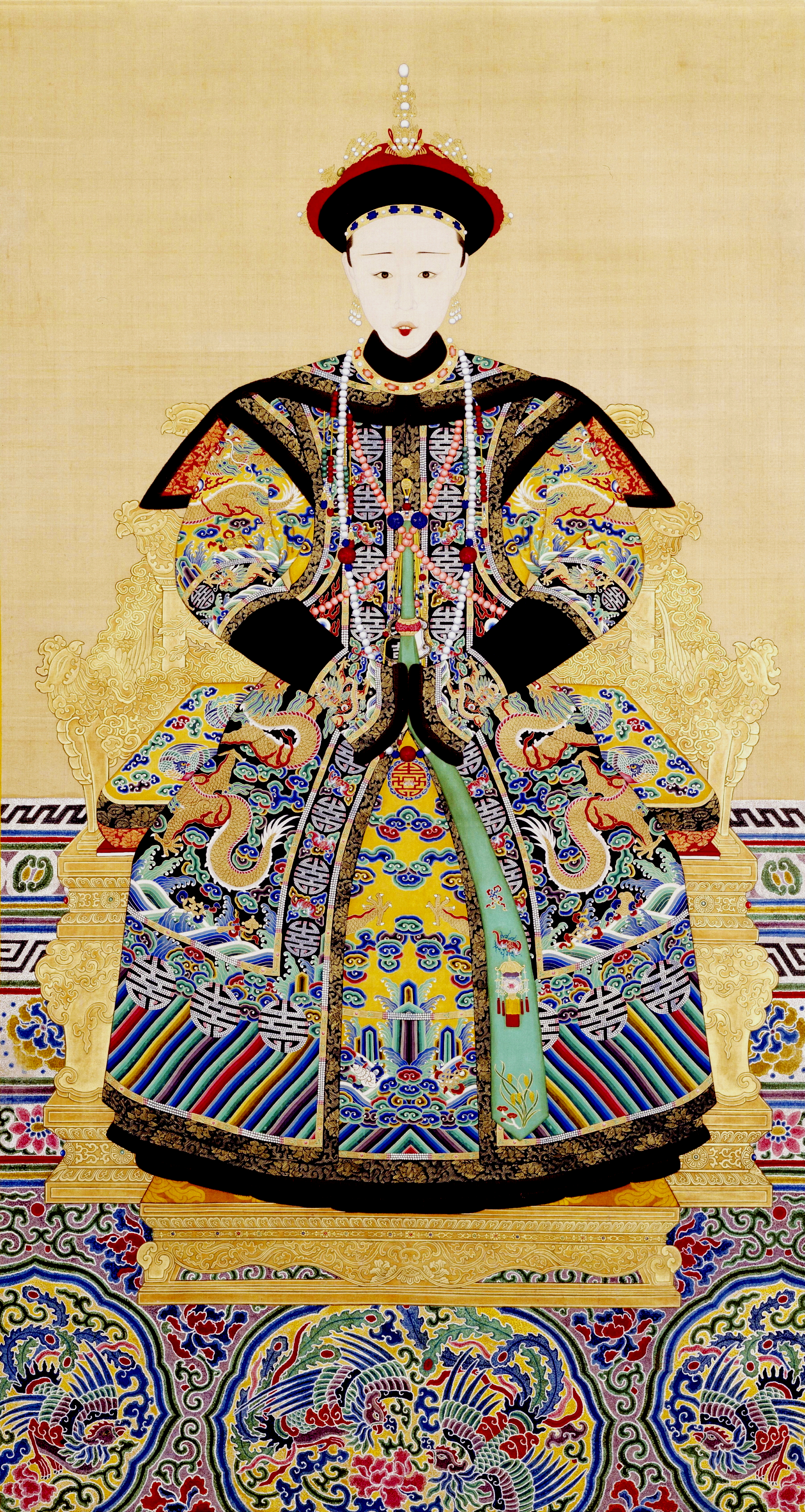
In court dress

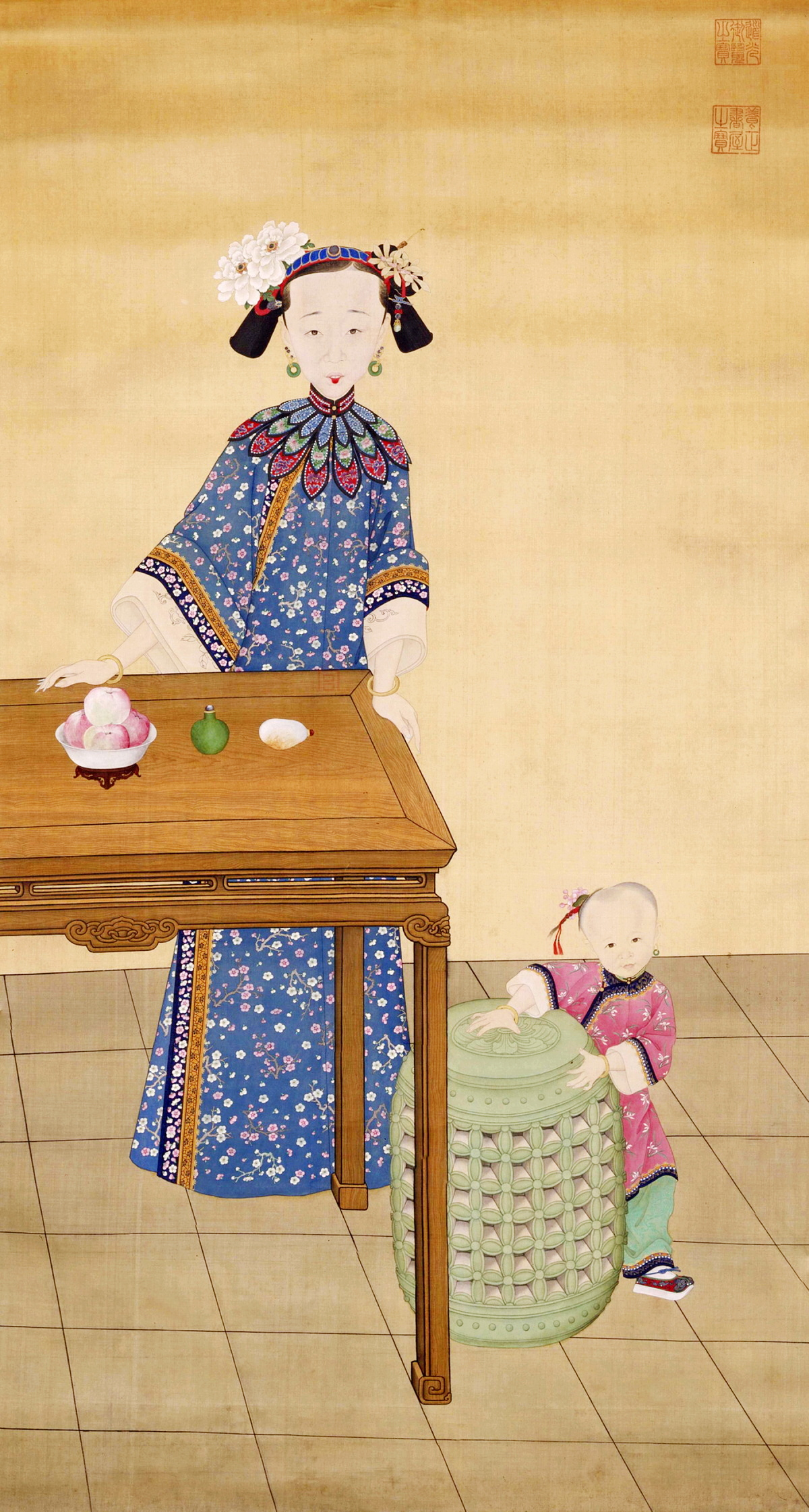
In daily dress, with Princess Shou'an of the First Rank

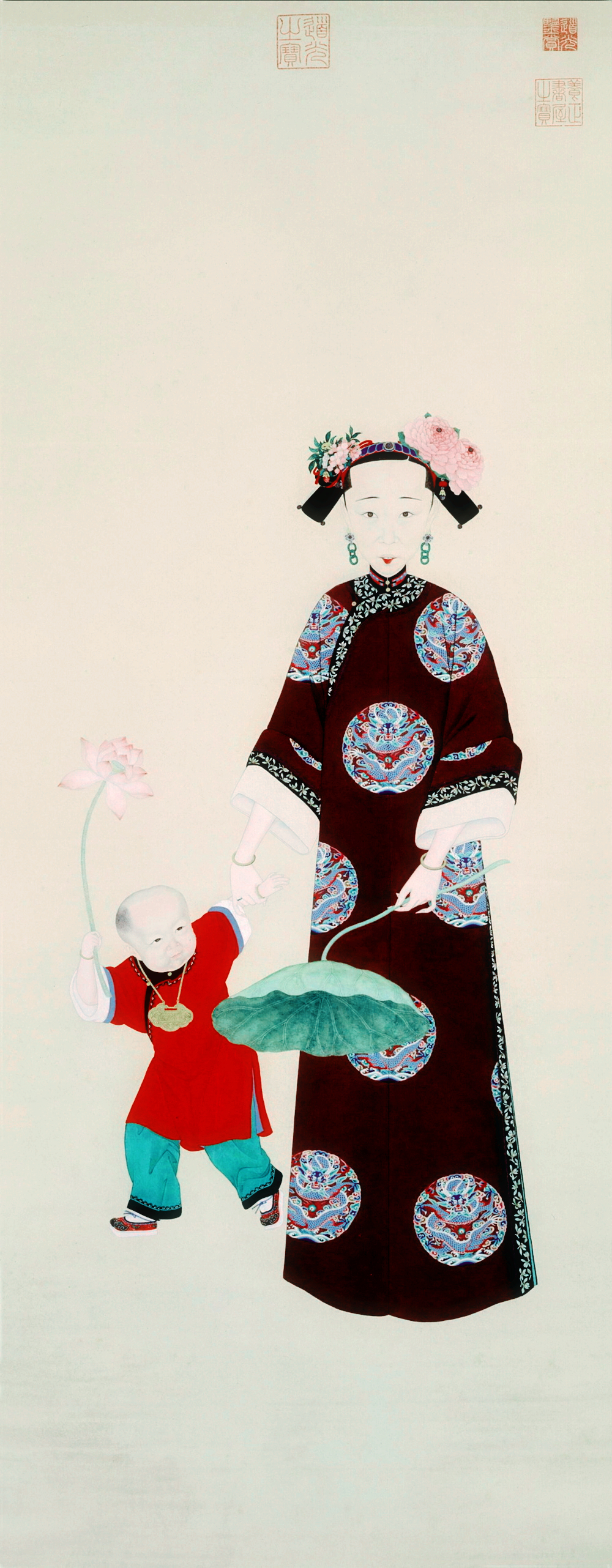
In daily dress, with Yizhu

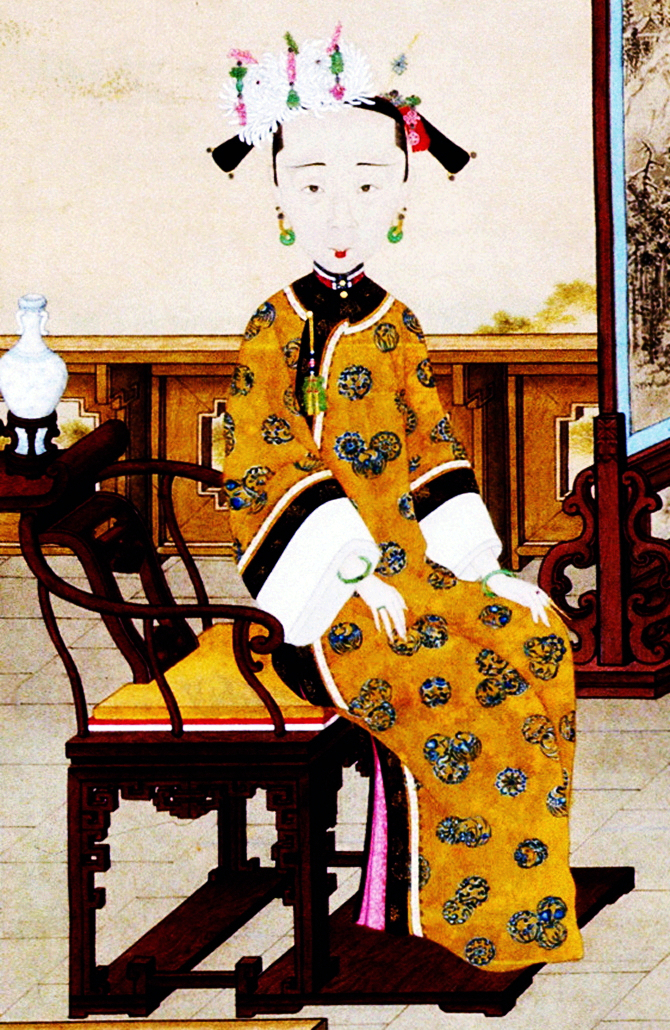
In daily dress

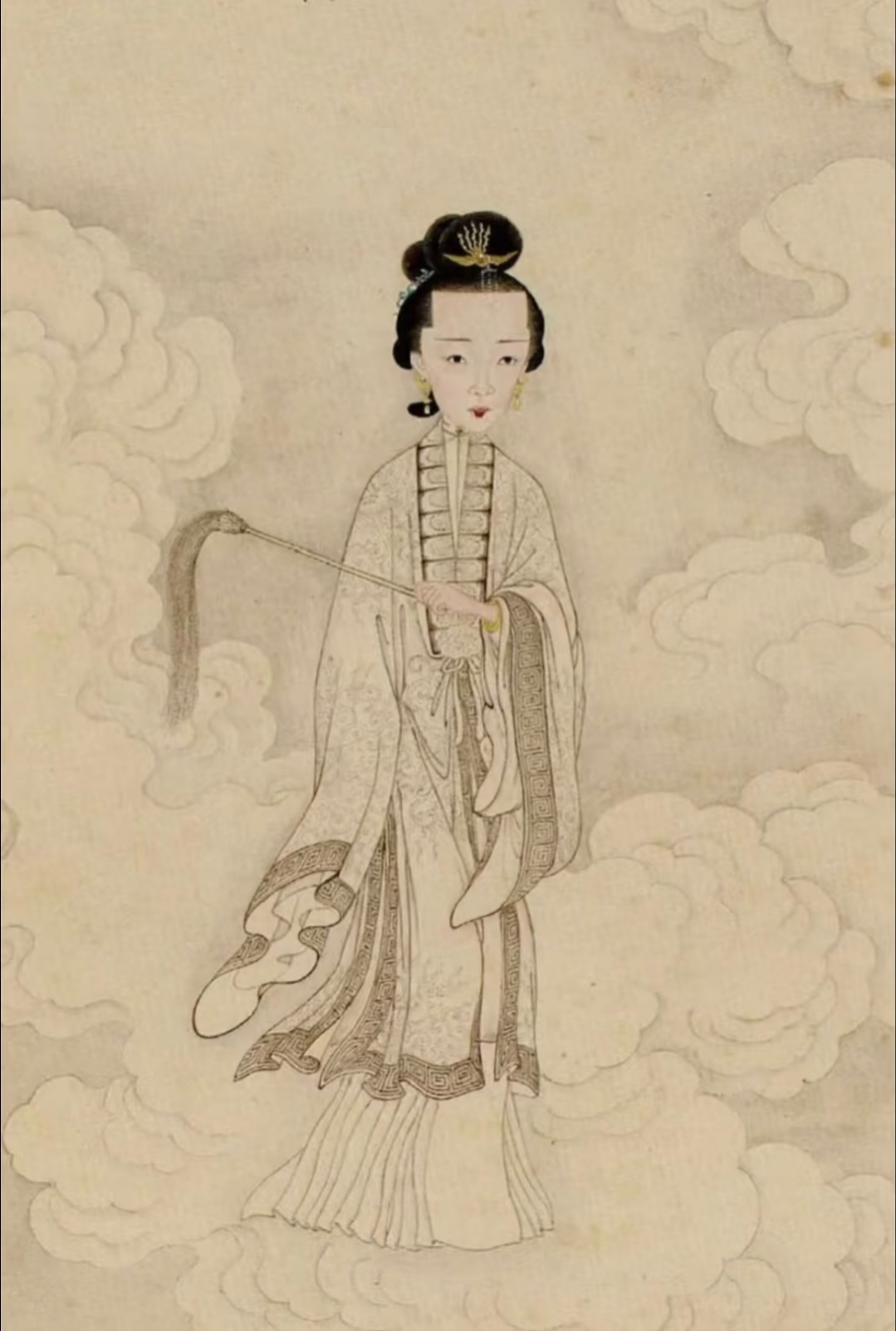
In Taoist costume

== In fiction and popular culture ==
- Portrayed by Choi Sin-yu in The Rise and Fall of Qing Dynasty (1988)
- Portrayed by Dai Chunrong in Sigh of His Highness (2006)
- Portrayed by Jessica Hsuan in Curse of the Royal Harem (2011)

== See also ==
- Ranks of imperial consorts in China#Qing
- Royal and noble ranks of the Qing dynasty

== Notes ==
Empress Xiaoquancheng Niohuru Clan
Chinese royalty
| Preceded by Empress Xiaoshencheng of the Tunggiya clan | Empress consort of China; 18 November 1834 – 13 February 1840 | Succeeded by Empress Xiaozhenxian of the Niohuru clan |
