= Kūwaja (Prince Consort) =

Kūwaja (Manchu: ᡴᡡᠸᠠᠵᠠ, romanized: Kūwaja; died 1649) was a Qing nobleman of the Irgen Gioro clan of the Plain Blue Banner. He was a son of Asan, a founding contributor to the Qing dynasty who held the hereditary title of First-Class Viscount. In 1644, Kūwaja accompanied the Qing's main forces during their entry through Shanhai Pass and subsequent conquest of China proper. In December of the same year, he married a Gurun Princess, the sixth daughter of Hong Taiji, thereby becoming an imperial son-in-law (efu, prince consort). In 1648, he was punished for an unspecified offense. In 1649, the Gurun Princess died, and Kūwaja himself died of illness one month later.
