= Princess Ningguo =

Chinese princess (1364–1434)

Princess Ningguo 寧國公主
- Born: 10 October 1364
- Died: 7 September 1434 (aged 69)
- Spouse: Mei Yin (m. 1378; died 1405)
- Issue: Mei Shunchang; Mei Jingfu; Mei Yongzhen
- Father: Hongwu Emperor
- Mother: Empress Ma

Chinese name
- Traditional Chinese: 寧國公主
- Simplified Chinese: 宁国公主
- Literal meaning: Princess of the State of Ning
Transcriptions
Standard Mandarin
- Hanyu Pinyin: Níngguó gōngzhǔ

Princess Ningguo (10 October 1364 – 7 September 1434) was a princess of the Ming dynasty, the second daughter of the Hongwu Emperor and his eldest by Empress Ma. In 1378, the Hongwu Emperor bestowed upon his daughter the title of Princess Ningguo and arranged her marriage to Mei Yin, nephew of Mei Sizu, Marquis of Runan. She bore Mei Yin three sons. After her father's death in 1398, Princess Ningguo and her husband became caught up in the civil war that followed, as they supported their nephew, the Jianwen Emperor, against her brother Zhu Di, Prince of Yan. After Zhu Di's victory in 1402, he ascended the throne as the Yongle Emperor. Later, Mei Yin was killed by two officers, and the Yongle Emperor was suspected of ordering the killing. The widowed princess was elevated to Grand Princess Ningguo in 1406 by the Yongle Emperor, and to Princess Supreme Ningguo in 1424 by his son, the Hongxi Emperor. She died in 1434.

== Background and marriage ==
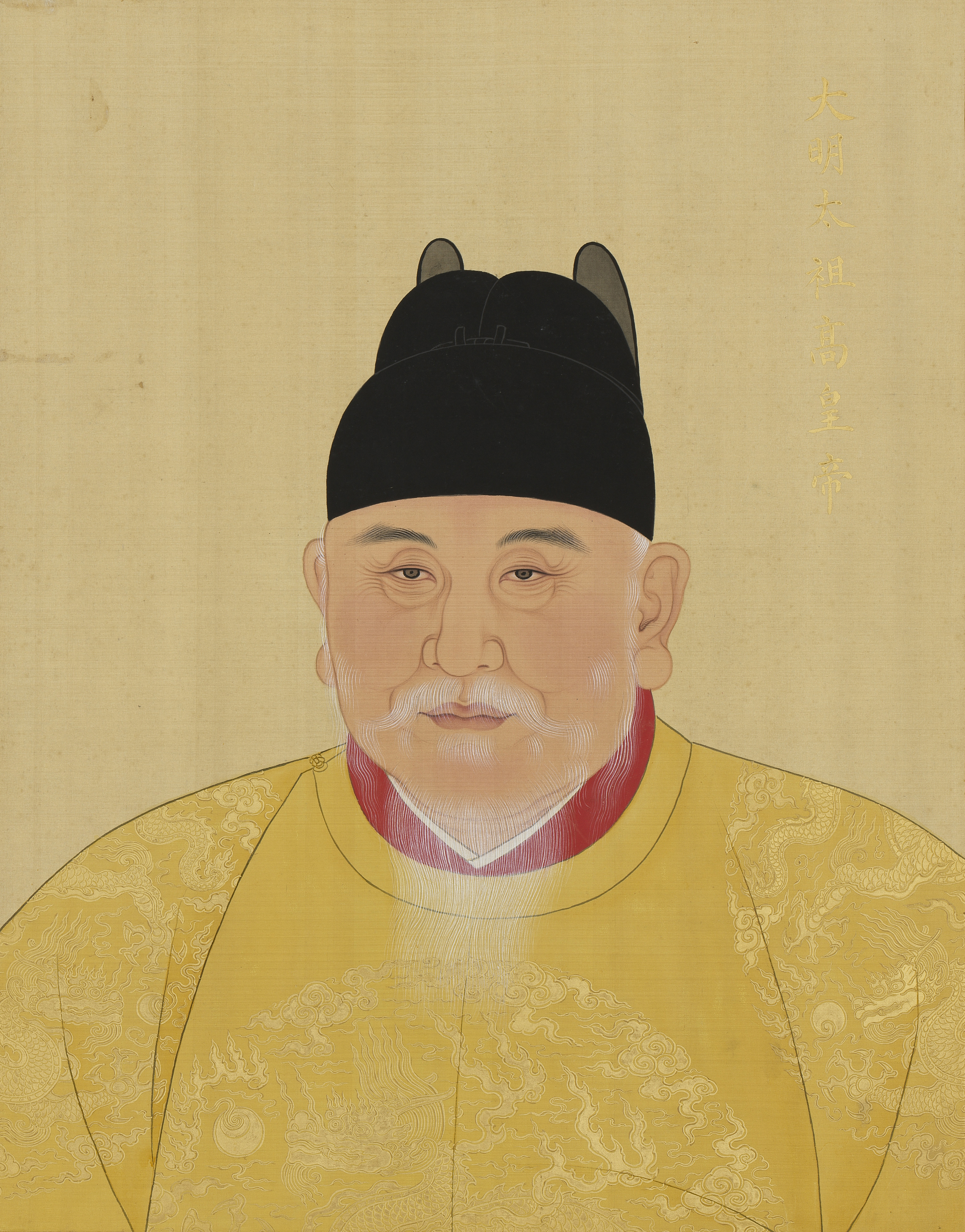
The Hongwu Emperor, the father of Princess Ningguo, in his old age, c. 1397

Princess Ningguo was born on 10 October 1364, as the second daughter of Zhu Yuanzhang. Her mother was Lady Ma, Zhu's primary consort. At this time, Zhu Yuanzhang was based in Nanjing and had emerged as a leading rebel figure in the Red Turban Rebellion, a movement directed against the Mongol-led Yuan dynasty. The rebellion sought to restore Han Chinese rule after nearly a century of foreign domination. By the 1360s, he consolidated his conquests, established the Ming dynasty, and proclaimed himself emperor, with the era name Hongwu.

In 1378, the Hongwu Emperor bestowed upon his second daughter the title of Princess Ningguo and arranged her marriage to Mei Yin, nephew of Mei Sizu (梅思祖), Marquis of Runan. The Emperor held particular respect for Mei Yin among his sixteen sons-in-law. Mei was appointed provincial educational commissioner of Shandong. The Emperor issued an edict praising Mei's knowledge of the Confucian classics and history, which earned him considerable respect among court officials. Princess Ningguo and Mei Yin had three sons: Mei Shunchang (梅順昌), Mei Jingfu (梅景福), and Mei Yongzhen (梅永貞). In the later years of the Hongwu Emperor's reign, the Emperor's sons grew very powerful as princes (王; wang) and military commanders, so he entrusted Mei Yin with supporting his grandson and designated heir, Zhu Yunwen.

== Later life ==
Following the Hongwu Emperor's death in 1398, Zhu Yunwen ascended the throne as the Jianwen Emperor. The new ruler sought to weaken the power of the feudal princes through his policy of "reducing the feudatories", which led his uncle Zhu Di, Prince of Yan, to launch a rebellion in August 1399. In December 1401, the Emperor ordered Mei Yin to defend Huai'an, where he enforced strict military discipline and implemented rigorous defensive measures against Zhu Di's forces. As the Jianwen Emperor's aunt and Zhu Di's younger sister, Princess Ningguo was caught between the opposing sides of the imperial family. She sided with the Jianwen Emperor, opposed her brother's bid for the throne, and wrote to him urging him to withdraw. Zhu Di, however, ignored her appeals and continued his southward advance. In May 1402, he decisively defeated the Jianwen Emperor's forces and captured several imperial generals. He then requested Mei Yin to allow his forces passage through Huai'an, but Mei refused. Zhu Di therefore bypassed the city and marched through Yangzhou on his way to Nanjing.

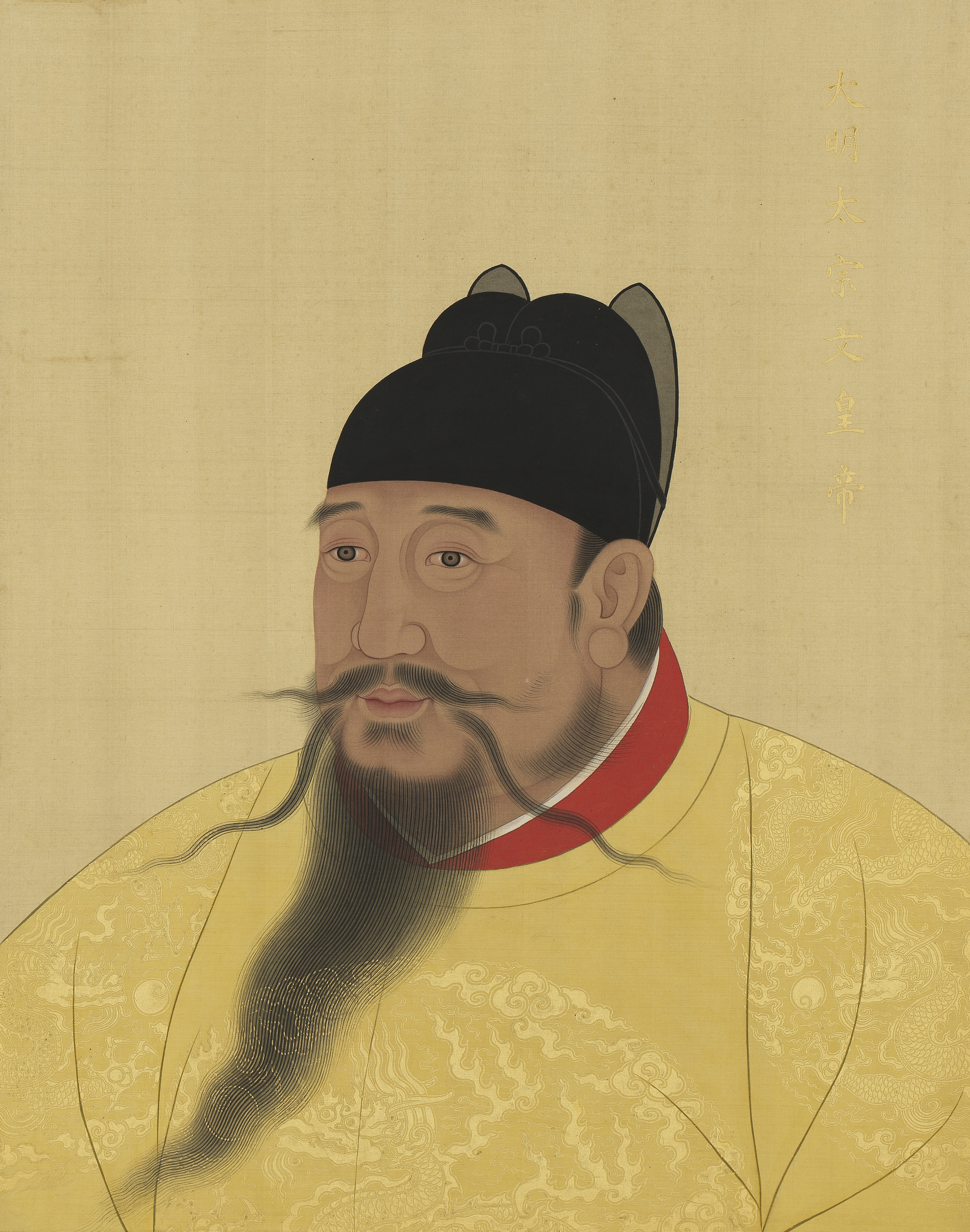
A Ming dynasty portrait of the Yongle Emperor, Princess Ningguo's brother who was suspected of being behind her husband's death.

On 13 July 1402, Zhu Di captured Nanjing, during which the Jianwen Emperor disappeared. Four days later, Zhu Di ascended the throne as the Yongle Emperor. At that time, Mei Yin continued to command a large army stationed along the Huai River. The new emperor pressured Princess Ningguo to write a letter urging her husband to surrender. Princess Ningguo initially refused, but as the situation grew increasingly hopeless and she sought to prevent further conflict between her husband and her natal family, she bit her finger and wrote a letter in her own blood urging him to submit. Upon receiving the letter, Mei Yin wept bitterly and proceeded to Nanjing. As Mei Yin remained loyal to the former regime and was unwilling to fully submit to the new regime, the Yongle Emperor secretly directed his close associates to seek an opportunity to implicate him.

In 1404, Censor-in-Chief Chen Ying (陳瑛) accused Mei Yin of sheltering fugitives and engaging in witchcraft. The Emperor then instructed the Ministry of Revenue to review the quotas of attendants and guards allocated to dukes, marquises, prince consorts, and barons. He also ordered the Embroidered Uniform Guard to escort Mei Yin's family to Liaodong.

In October 1405, as Mei Yin crossed a bridge on way to the capital, two junior military commanders, Tan Shen (譚深) and Zhao Xi (趙曦), pushed him into the river and he drowned. Although Tan and Zhao initially reported that Mei Yin had taken his own life, the official Xu Cheng (許成) later revealed that he had been killed in an attack. The Yongle Emperor had Tan and Zhao executed, confiscated their families' properties, and dispatched officials to supervise Mei's funeral. Mei Yin was granted the posthumous name "Rongding".

When Princess Ningguo learned of her husband's death, she expressed her grief and held the Yongle Emperor responsible. The Emperor later appointed his nephews Mei Shunchang and Mei Jingfu to military positions and stated in a letter to the princess that he had previously tolerated Mei Yin's faults because of their familial relationship. He further stated that he had suspected foul circumstances surrounding Mei Yin's death, had rewarded Xu Cheng after he uncovered those circumstances, and had punished those responsible.

In 1406, the Yongle Emperor elevated Princess Ningguo to Grand Princess Ningguo (寧國長公主). In 1424, the Yongle Emperor's son and successor, the Hongxi Emperor, further elevated his aunt to Princess Supreme Ningguo (寧國大長公主). The princess died on 7 September 1434.
