= Princess Huaiqing =

Chinese princess (1368–1425)

Zhu Funing 朱福寧
- Princess Huaiqing
- Born: 5 February 1368
- Died: 15 July 1425 (aged 57)
- Burial: Jiangning, Nanjing
- Spouse: Wang Ning
- Father: Hongwu Emperor
- Mother: Noble Consort Chengmu

Chinese name
- Traditional Chinese: 懷慶公主
- Simplified Chinese: 怀庆公主
Transcriptions
Standard Mandarin
- Hanyu Pinyin: Huáiqìng Gōngzhǔ

Personal name
- Traditional Chinese: 朱福寧
- Simplified Chinese: 朱福宁
Transcriptions
Standard Mandarin
- Hanyu Pinyin: Zhū Fúníng

Princess Huaiqing (5 February 1368 (Note: The "Epitaph of Princess Supreme Huaiqing" records that she was born on the 17th day of the first month in the Wushen year of the Hongwu era. This date corresponds to 5 February 1368 on the Julian calendar.) – 15 July 1425), personal name Zhu Funing, (Note: According to the "Epitaph of Princess Supreme Huaiqing", the princess's personal name was recorded as Zhu Funing.) was a Ming dynasty princess and the sixth daughter of the Hongwu Emperor. Her mother was Noble Consort Chengmu, and she was the full younger sister of Princess Lin'an. In 1382, she was granted the title Princess Huaiqing and married Wang Ning, with whom she had two sons. In 1424, she was elevated to Princess Supreme Huaiqing.

== Biography ==
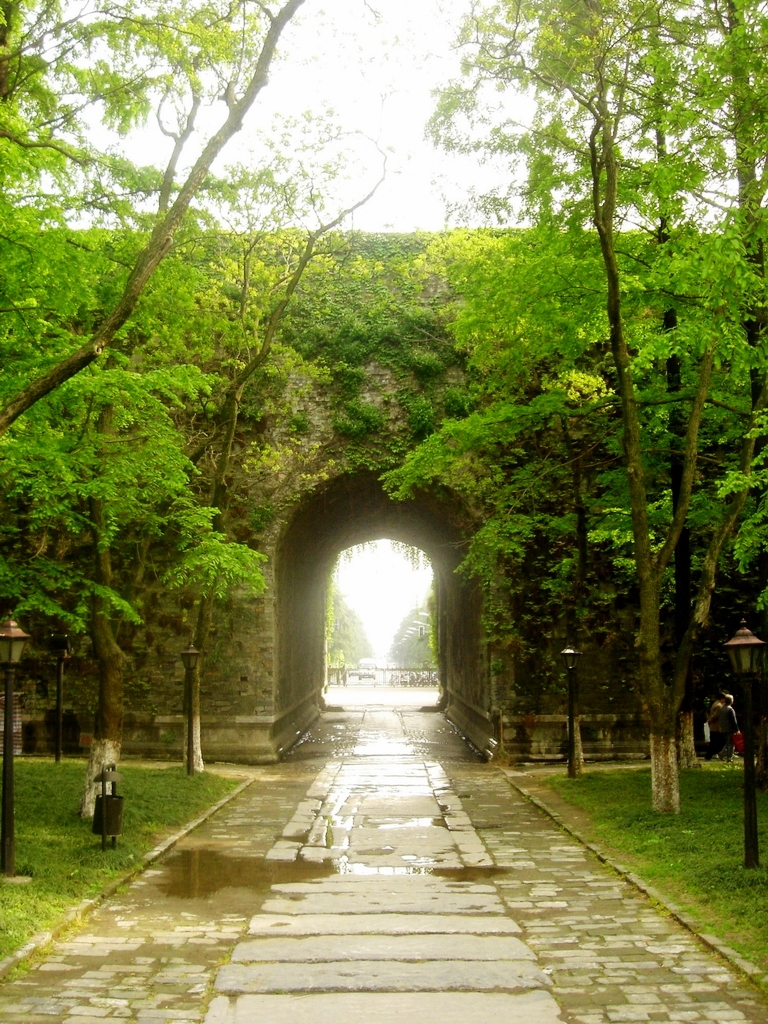
Ruins of the Ming Palace in Nanjing, where Huaiqing was born.

On 11 September 1382, Princess Huaiqing was married to Wang Ning (王寧). Following the wedding, Wang was promoted to the position of Commissioner of the Rear Military Commission. In 1398, upon the death of the Hongwu Emperor, his grandson Zhu Yunwen ascended the throne as the Jianwen Emperor. The new emperor soon introduced the policy of "reducing the feudatories", seeking to curtail the power of imperial princes. This measure provoked the rebellion of his uncle Zhu Di, the Prince of Yan and Princess Huaiqing's elder brother, in August 1399. During the ensuing civil war, Wang betrayed court secrets to Zhu Di, which led to the confiscation of the princess's household property and Wang's imprisonment by the Embroidered Uniform Guard.

In June 1402, Zhu Di seized Nanjing, and the Jianwen Emperor disappeared under mysterious circumstances. The following month, Zhu Di ascended the throne as the Yongle Emperor. He proclaimed that Wang had been "filial to Taizu [the Hongwu Emperor], loyal to the state, upright and unyielding, yet falsely incriminated", and ennobled him as Marquis of Yongchun (永春侯). Later, however, Wang was implicated in another case and imprisoned, though he received an imperial pardon. He died soon after his release.

On 21 November 1424, Princess Huaiqing was elevated to the rank of Princess Supreme Huaiqing (懷慶大長公主). She died on 15 July 1425. Her tomb was unearthed in September 2017 in Jiangning District, Nanjing, and in September 2023 it was designated a municipal-level cultural heritage protection site.

Princess Huaiqing and her husband had two sons: Wang Zhenliang (王貞亮) and Wang Zhenqing (王貞慶). Wang Zhenqing was one of the Ten Talents of the Jingtai era. However, according to the "Epitaph of Grand Princess Imperial Huaiqing", the couple had three sons: Wang Zhenliang, Wang Zhenji and Wang Zhenqing.
