= Young Yang Chung =

South Korean textile historian

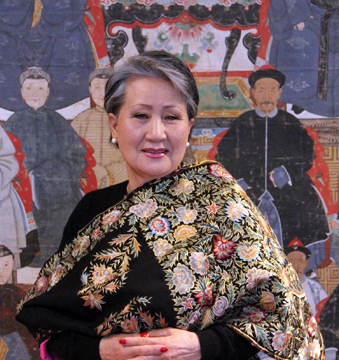
- Chung, textile historian

Korean name
- Hangul: 정영양
- Hanja: 鄭英陽
- RR: Jeong Yeongyang
- MR: Chŏng Yŏngyang

Young Yang Chung is a textile historian and embroiderer. She earned a Ph.D. at New York University in 1976, with a doctoral dissertation on the origins of embroidery and its historical development of China, Japan, and Korea, and has lectured worldwide on the topic of East Asian embroidery. Through lectures, demonstrations, writings, teaching, workshops, and exhibitions of her work, she has endeavored to foster appreciation of an art form often stigmatized as "women's work" and to challenge the notion of textiles as "minor arts".

Chung received an honorary doctorate degree from Sookmyung University, Seoul, South Korea in 2001 and she was awarded a Distinguished Alumna Achievement Award by New York University's Steinhardt School of Culture, Education, and Human Development at the 2013 Doctoral Convocation.

Chung has dedicated her life to the textile arts, not only as an embroiderer and teacher of this art form but also as a historian of traditional East Asian textiles and a collector of outstanding examples. Her embroideries are included in the collections of numerous museums in the world including the Smithsonian Institution and the presidential palaces.

Her legacy includes a body of groundbreaking publications such as The Art of Oriental Embroidery (1979) and Silken Threads: A History of Embroidery in China, Korea, Japan, and Vietnam (2005), as well as the Chung Young Yang Embroidery Museum (C.E.M.), an exhibition, educational, and research facility she inaugurated in May 2004 at Sookmyung Women's University in Seoul.

Chung was the curator of The Chung Young Yang Embroidery Museum's inaugural exhibition, which traces the origins of silk embroidery in China and its dissemination throughout East Asia, and she will remain at the Museum as a director and curator, in addition to being a professor of graduate school of arts and designs.

== The Dawn of Embroidery Art ==
In her book Painting with a Needle (2003), she wrote: "Small needles and homespun threads proved to be powerful, life-changing tools that provided me and other Korean women with a viable vocation as well as an expressive and rewarding creative outlet... needlework carried me from a small Korean village of 30 families along a fascinating pathway across time and geographic region."

Chung is a teacher of embroidery, and during the economically difficult period of South Korea's post-war reconstruction, She was able to harness this art form to positively impact many South Korean women's lives. In 1965 she founded her own institute, the International Embroidery School, and produced a new generation of Korean embroidery artists.

In 1967, under the auspices of the Ministry of Social Work, she established South Korea's first vocational embroidery center, The Women's Center. This school provided opportunities for numerous young women who needed gainful work.

In the same year, she was invited by the Japan Handicraft Association to present an exhibition of her and her students' embroidery at the prestigious Ikenobo Women's Finishing School in Japan. When Chung announced that entrance fee proceeds would be donated to provide embroidery supplies for schools teaching handicapped children in Tokyo, this was seen as remarkable gesture for a Korean woman, and the exhibition was extended with the financial support of a local hotel. Recognition such as this opened a valuable route to marketing the works created by her students, which in turn enabled the school to support itself financially.

Her mission to promote Korean embroidery led to her to Iran in 1968, where she exhibited her work in conjunction with the Tehran World's Fair. The exhibition of her embroidery in Cairo, Egypt, supported by the Korea Trade Association, also served to elevate South Korea's national prestige in this area of the world.

In the late 1960s, Chung was featured in a documentary produced by the South Korean television station KBS on young women of achievement. This publicity eventually led to more invitations to exhibit her embroidery abroad, from the U.S. to Japan and Europe, which garnered her international fame.

== Scholastic Achievement in the Art of Embroidery ==
In the U.S., she devoted considerable time and effort to the study of Western and Eastern embroideries in the Textile Study Room at the Metropolitan Museum of Art. The affirmation of East Asian identity and history remained one of the main objectives in Young Yang Chung's embroidery as well as her scholarly activities. She completed her master's degree and Ph.D. in art education at New York University. Her Ph.D. dissertation, entitled The Origins and Historical Development of Embroidery in China, Japan, and Korea was the first in-depth academic study of this topic, providing the foundation for embroidery as an academic field. As a rare reference on this little-studied subject, her doctoral dissertation was published in 1978 in book form by UMI Dissertation Services.

Through her work activities and academic research, Chung has established the distinctiveness and history of East Asian embroidery. For example, through her screen depicting ancient musical instruments, she not only produced an accurate visual representation of the subject, but also evoked deeply felt cultural ideals, as these traditional musical instruments fully capture the spirit of the Korean people, who value tradition highly.

In the 1970s, Chung was called in as a consultant for an exhibition of Chinese dragon robes at the Metropolitan Museum, and had the opportunity to study the response of the visitors. This inspired Chung to set forth on a campaign – through lectures, demonstrations, writings, teaching, workshops, and exhibitions of her work – to elevate the public conception and knowledge of embroidery.

Her first book, The Art of Oriental Embroidery (published in 1979), became a standard reference in the field, and in it she emphasized embroidery's antiquity, and challenged the notion that textiles are "minor arts." She explained that embroidery vividly records the technological and socio-economic milieu in which it was produced, and provides evidence of cultural exchange, regional aesthetics, and the maker's individual creativity. These pioneering efforts introduced East Asian embroidery to Western audiences, and fostered an ever-increasing appreciation of and interest in the art of silk embroidery.

Western enthusiasm for Asian embroidery eventually led, for example, to the establishment of the Japanese Embroidery Center in Atlanta, which teaches traditional Asian techniques to American students. Chung's works have been acquired by museums such as the Smithsonian Institution. Silken Threads, published in 2005 in the United States, summarizes the history of the embroiderers' art; it is the result of her lifetime of study, and can be viewed as the only comprehensive academic textbook on embroidery.

== The Future of Embroidery Art ==
C.E.M. opened in May 2004 through the combined efforts of Chung, an active figure in the international arena, and Sookmyung Women's University, which maintains a forward-thinking cultural vision.

The museum's collection includes hundreds of historical examples, ranging from a 4th to 3rd century BCE bronze mirror with an embroidered silk cover, right up to the present day. Also included are forms such as embroidered Chinese votive textiles, ecclesiastical robes, military uniforms, folding screens, wedding garments, chair and table coverings, Chinese court costumes, and rank insignia, as well as Japanese embroidery. The wide scope of the collection illuminates the cross-cultural dialogues in technique and style that have enriched textile arts worldwide.

Housed in a newly constructed building that includes exhibition galleries, a library, conservations studios (including the C.E.M. Textile Study Center), classrooms, and a 300-seat auditorium equipped with earphones for simultaneous translation, the museum aims to become a leading center for scholarship in embroidery and other textile arts. The Chung Young Yang Embroidery Museum aims to become both a cultural and academic center where the legacy of Chung and her global collection can be appreciated by a wide audience.

== Works ==
Her numerous publications remain standard references in this field, and include:

- The Origins and Historical Development of Embroidery in China, Japan, and Korea, 1976
- The Art of Oriental Embroidery, 1979
- Painting with a Needle: Learning The Art of Silk Embroidery With Young Yang Chung, 2003
- Silken Threads-Embroidered Court Costume, And Rank Insignia of China, Japan Korea, And Vietnam, 2004
