= Imperial Noble Consort Sunheon =

Korean imperial consort (1854–1911)

- Imperial Noble Consort
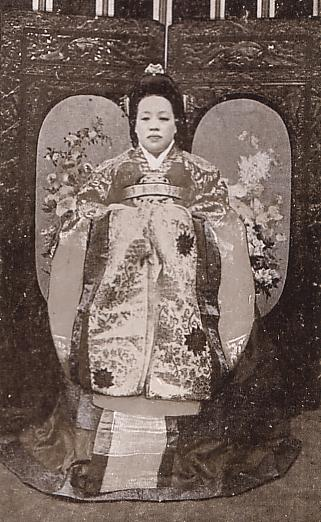
- Photograph in ceremonial attire
- Born: Eom Seon-yeong (엄선영; 嚴善英); 2 February 1854; Souimun-bang, Hanseong, Joseon
- Died: 20 July 1911 (aged 57); Hamnyeongjeon Hall, Deoksugung, Keijō, Chōsen
- Burial: Yeonghwiwon, Seoul, South Korea
- Consort of: Gojong of Korea
- Issue: Crown Prince Euimin
Names
- Ranks: Noble Lady (귀인; 貴人; from 1897) → Concubine Sun (순빈; 淳嬪; from 1900) → Consort Sun (순비; 淳妃; from 1901) → Imperial Noble Consort (황귀비; 皇貴妃; from 1902)
Posthumous name
- Sunheon (순헌황; 純獻皇)
- Clan: Yeongwol Eom (by birth); Jeonju Yi (by marriage)
- Dynasty: Yi
- Father: Eom Jin-sam
- Mother: Lady, of the Miryang Park clan

Korean name
- Hangul: 순헌황귀비
- Hanja: 純獻皇貴妃
- RR: Sunheon Hwanggwibi
- MR: Sunhŏn Hwanggwibi

Imperial Noble Consort Sunheon (Korean: 순헌황귀비; 2 February 1854 – 20 July 1911), of the Yeongwol Eom clan, personal name was Eom Seon-yeong, was a consort of Gojong of Korea and the biological mother of Crown Prince Uimin.

== Biography ==
=== Early life ===
Lady Eom was the eldest daughter and the third of the five children of Eom Jin-sam and his wife, a lady from the Miryang Park clan. Her father served as an officer at Changdeokgung during the early years of Gojong's reign.

She entered the palace at the age of 8 in January 1861, and was assigned to serve as a maid within Gyeongbokgung.

Because her elder brothers had died young, her father had no heir to carry on his lineage. Her cousin Eom Jun-won, the second son of her father's elder brother Eom Jin-il, was adopted by her father. Eom Jun-won himself had to adopt a son from within their clan.

=== Palace life ===
During the Imo Incident of 1882, when Queen Min (posthumously Empress Myeongseong) was forced to flee the palace, Lady Eom demonstrated extreme loyalty to Gojong. She was rewarded with a fifth rank promotion (the highest rank for palace ladies). In her new position as jimil sanggung (지밀상궁), also known as daeryeong sanggung (대령상궁), she was responsible for attending the king, the queen, the queen dowager, or a royal consort, and received direct orders from the person she served.

In 1885, Queen Min expelled Lady Eom from the palace after discovering that she had been favored by Gojong; however, Yun Yong-seon, a high-ranking official, interceded on her behalf and she kept her position. Lady Eom never forgot Yun Yong-seon's grace.

After Queen Min was assassinated in October 1895, Lady Eom returned to the palace and became the king's favorite concubine.

In 1897, she gave birth to Yi Un, and two days later, she officially became a royal consort, with the rank of noble lady (귀인; 貴人; gwiin). In 1900, Lady Eom was promoted to the rank of concubine (빈; 嬪; bin) with the honorific title sun (순; 淳), meaning "honest"; the following year, she was raised to consort (비; 妃). In 1903, she was appointed imperial noble consort (황귀비; 皇貴妃).

Gojong then attempted to install Lady Eom as his empress. However, Yi Jun-yong, the emperor's nephew, opposed the idea.

In April 1899, Yi Jun-yong had joined the campaign against Lady Eom's reprimand against the Japanese asylum seekers. As a result of discussions with Yu Gil-jun, Kwon Dong-jin, Jo Jung-eung, and two or three others, he resolved to oppose Lady Eom's elevation to empress. Yi stated that her humble origins would diminish the imperial family's prestige, which would in turn jeopardize the country, and decided to send a letter of advice to Lee Jae-soon, the Minister of the Household.

In addition, Yi Jun-yong sent a letter to his father (Emperor Gojong's elder brother), Prince Imperial Heung, stating that treacherous officials were attempting to have Lady Eom appointed as empress in order to gain government positions. He argued that at such a time, those associated with the imperial family must clearly express their opposition. It was said that Yi Jun-yong campaigned so ardently against Lady Eom's elevation to empress because she had dismissed Yi Jun-yong and his son Yi Kang, who were in exile in Japan, to secure the succession of her own son. Because Crown Prince Cheok had no son and was severely ill due to a poisoning plot, Lady Eom started to raise her son, Yi Un, as the next crown prince. However, as Yi Kang figured out her plan, he opposed her and they came into conflict.

Due to the death of Crown Princess Min in 1907, and remembering the help she received from Yun Yong-seon, she recommended his adoptive great-granddaughter, Yun Jeung-sun (posthumously Empress Sunjeonghyo), as the second wife of Yi Cheok.

Lady Eom eventually succeeded in making her son the successor of Emperor Sunjong, but Crown Prince Un was taken by Ito Hirobumi to Japan under the pretext of raising him.

=== Later years and death ===
Lady Eom founded Yangchunguisuk (now Yangchung High School) in 1905, and Jinmyeong Girls' School (now Jinmyeong Girls' High School) and Myeongshin Girls' School (now Sookmyeong Women's University) in 1906.

She later suffered from typhoid fever in 1911, and eventually died on 20 July, at the age of 57, in Hamnyeongjeon Hall, Deoksugung. At the time, Yi Un was living in Japan and wasn't told about her death until later.

After her death, Lady Eom was given the posthumous name Sunheon (순헌; 純獻) by Emperor Sunjong.

Her tomb is called Yeonghwiwon, and her elder grandson, Yi Jin, was later buried within the grounds. Her spirit tablet was additionally enshrined in Chilgung (칠궁; 七宮).

== Family ==
- Father: Eom Jin-sam (엄진삼; 嚴眞三; 9 October 1812 – 28 July 1879)
- Mother: Lady, of the Miryang Park clan (밀양 박씨; 1824–1895)
- Sibling(s)
  - Elder brother: Eom Bong-won (엄봉원; 嚴鳳源)
  - Elder brother: Eom Hak-won (엄학원; 嚴鶴源)
  - Adopted younger brother: Eom Jun-won (엄준원; 嚴俊源; 1855 – 13 February 1938)
  - Younger sister: Lady, of the Yeongwol Eom clan (영월 엄씨)
- Husband
  - Yi Hui, Emperor Gojong (고종황제 이희; 8 September 1952 – 21 January 1919)
- Son
  - Yi Un, Crown Prince Uimin (의민태자 이은; 20 October 1897 – 1 May 1970)
    - Daughter-in-law: Yi Bangja, Crown Princess Euimin (의민황태자비 이방자; née Princess Masako of Nashimoto; 4 November 1901 – 30 April 1989)
      - Grandson: Yi Jin (이진; 李晉; 18 August 1921 – 11 May 1922)
      - Grandson: Yi Ku (이구; 李玖; 29 September 1931 – 16 July 2005)
        - Granddaughter-in-law: Julia Mullock (18 March 1923 – 26 November 2017)
          - Adopted great-granddaughter: Eugenia Yi Eunsuk (이은숙; 李恩淑; b. 1959)
          - Adopted great-grandson: Yi Won (이원; 李源; b. 23 September 1962)

== In popular culture ==
- Portrayed by Um Aing-ran in the 1959 film Independence Association and young Rhee Syung-Man.
- Portrayed by Um Aing-ran in the 1964 film The Sino-Japanese War and Queen Min the Heroine.
- Portrayed by Kim Eun-jeong and Shin So-min in the 1990 MBC TV series Daewongun.
- Portrayed by Oh Ji-yeong in the 1995 KBS1 TV series Dazzling Dawn.
- Portrayed by Seo Mi-ae in the 2001–2002 KBS2 TV series Empress Myeongseong.
- Portrayed by Kim Ja-ok in the 2002 MBC TV series Do You Know Your Country.
- Portrayed by Kim Ju-ryeong in the 2018 tvN TV series Mr. Sunshine.
