= Imperial Chinese harem system =

Hierarchy in Imperial China

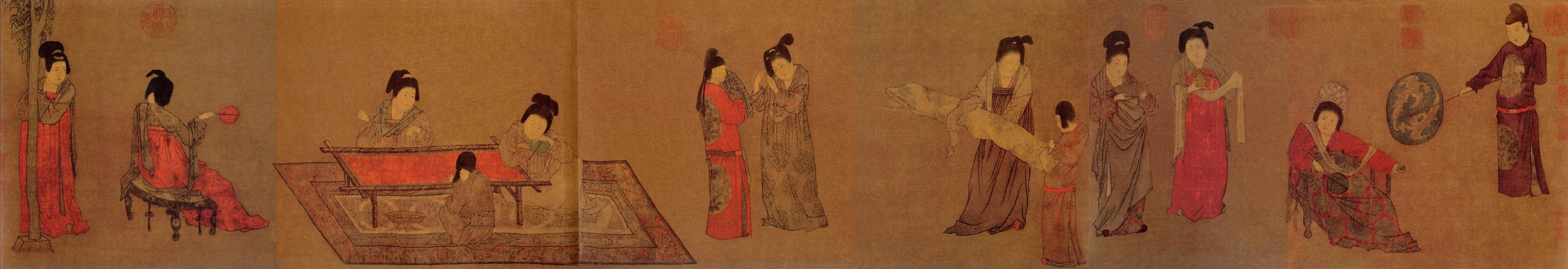
Imperial concunbines and their servants of the Tang period, Zhou Fang, VIII century

The ranks of imperial consorts have varied over the course of Chinese history but remained important throughout owing to its prominence in the management of the inner court and in imperial succession, which ranked heirs according to the prominence of their mothers in addition to their birth order. Regardless of the age, however, it is common in English translation to simplify this hierarchy into the three ranks of empress, consorts, and concubines. It is also common to use the term "harem", an Arabic loan word used in recent times to refer to imperial women's forbidden quarters in many countries. In later Chinese dynasties, these quarters were known as the inner palace (內宮; nèigōng) or the rear palace (後宮; hòugōng). In Chinese, the system is called the "rear palace system" (後宮制度; hòugōng zhìdù).

No matter the dynasty, the empress (皇后; huánghòu) held the highest rank and was the legal wife of the emperor, as well as the chief of the imperial harem and "mother of [all] under Heaven" (母后天下; mǔhòu tiānxià) which translates to ”imperial mother of all under heaven”. She was also known as the "central palace" (中宮; zhōnggōng). In addition, the emperor would typically have other imperial women (嬪妃; pínfēi). Every dynasty had its set of rules regarding the numerical composition of the harem.

== Early history ==
There existed a class of royal consorts called ying (媵; yìng) during early historical times in China. These were people who came along with brides as a form of dowry. It could be a female cousin or sister of the bride, or people from other countries.

Worth noting is the fact that during the Shang dynasty, there were times when two queens existed at the same period.

The Rites of Zhou contains great details of a royal consort ranking system. However, as the Rites of Zhou is considered by modern scholars to be merely a fictitious constitution for a utopian society, the system listed in that work of literature cannot be taken word for word. Rather, it offers a rough glimpse into the inner palace during the time.

=== Ranking system for kings ===
The Rites of Zhou states that kings are entitled to the following:

1. 1 Queen (王后; wánghòu)
2. 2 Consorts (妃; fēi)
3. 3 Madames (夫人; fūrén)
4. 9 Concubines (嬪; pín)
5. 27 Hereditary Ladies (世婦; shìfù)
6. 81 Royal Wives (御妻; yùqī)

It was suggested that a system (not necessarily resembling the one listed above) was set up to prevent the situation of having two queens/empresses.

=== Ranking system for others ===
According to the Rites of Zhou, under the feudal fengjian governance system, aristocratic feudal lords were entitled to nine consorts in total, and cannot marry again after having nine consorts, which makes for one wife and eight concubines. For other officers, they are entitled to one wife and one concubine. For normal citizens, only one wife is allowed.

== Qin ==
Under the Qin dynasty, from the reign of King Huiwen:

1. Queen (王后; wánghòu), which became Empress (皇后; huánghòu) from the reign of Qin Shi Huang
2. Madame (夫人; fūrén)
3. Lady of Beauty (美人; měirén)
4. Lady of Gentleness (良人; liángrén)
5. Learned Lady (八子; bāzi)
6. Harmonious Lady (七子; qīzi)
7. Senior Waiting Lady (長使; zhǎngshǐ)
8. Junior Waiting Lady (少使; shàoshǐ)

== Han ==
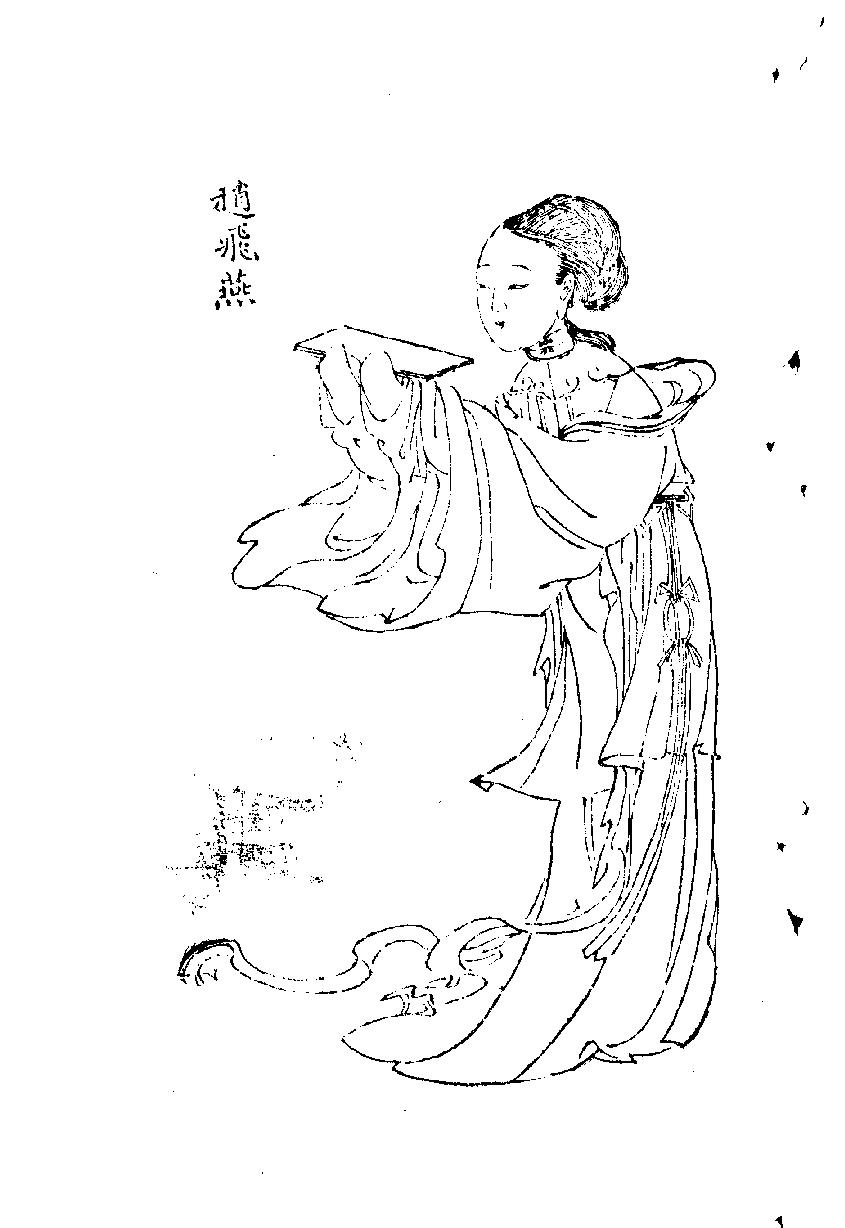
Zhao Feiyan

=== Western Han ===
During the reign of Gaozu of the Western Han dynasty:

1. Empress (皇后; huánghòu)
2. Madame (夫人; fūrén)

Later, during the reign of Emperor Wu:

1. Empress (皇后; huánghòu)
2. Lady of Handsome Fairness (婕妤; jiéyú)
3. Lady of Youthful Fairness (娙娥; xíng‘é)
4. Lady of Splendid Countenance (容華; rónghuá)
5. Lady of Complete Deportment (充衣; chōngyī)
6. Lady of Beauty (美人; měirén)
7. Lady of Gentleness (良人; liángrén)
8. Learned Lady (八子; bāzi)
9. Harmonious Lady (七子; qīzi)
10. Senior Waiting Lady (長使; zhǎngshǐ)
11. Junior Waiting Lady (少使; shàoshǐ)

From the reign of Emperor Yuan:

1. Empress (皇后; huánghòu)
2. Lady of Bright Deportment (昭儀; zhāoyí)
3. Lady of Handsome Fairness (婕妤; jiéyú)
4. Lady of Youthful Fairness (娙娥; xíng‘é)
5. Lady of Splendid Countenance (容華; rónghuá)
6. Lady of Complete Deportment (充衣; chōngyī)
7. Lady of Beauty (美人; měirén)
8. Lady of Gentleness (良人; liángrén)
9. Learned Lady (八子; bāzi)
10. Harmonious Lady (七子; qīzi)
11. Senior Waiting Lady (長使; zhǎngshǐ)
12. Junior Waiting Lady (少使; shàoshǐ)
13. Courtier of Miscellaneous Uses (五官; wǔguān)
14. Lady of Complaisant Constancy (順常; shùncháng)
15. Lady Without Impurity (舞涓; wǔjuān)
  Lady of Reverent Gentleness (共和; gònghé)
  Lady Who Pleases the Spirit (娛靈; yúlíng)
  Lady Who Can Safeguard a Multitude (保林; bǎolín)
  Gentle Waiting Lady (良使; liángshǐ)
  Lady of Night Attendance (夜者; yèzhě)

The crown prince:

1. Consort (妃; fēi)
2. Bride of Excellence (良娣; liángdì)
3. Dear Lady (孺人; rúrén)

=== Eastern Han ===
In the Eastern Han dynasty:

1. Empress (皇后; huánghòu)
2. Noble Lady (貴人; guìrén)
3. Lady of Beauty (美人; měirén)
4. Lady of the Palace (宮人; gōngrén)
5. Talented Woman (才女; cǎinǚ)

No limits were set for these imperial consorts. This later created situations when more than 20,000 women were living in the palace during the reigns of Emperor Huan and Emperor Ling.

== Three Kingdoms ==
During the Three Kingdoms period, Cao Wei used the following system:

=== Cao Wei ===
During the reign of Cao Cao (who was not an emperor but a king):

1. Queen (王后; wánghòu)
2. Madame (夫人; fūrén)
3. Lady of Bright Deportment (昭儀; zhāoyí)
4. Lady of Handsome Fairness (婕妤; jiéyú)
5. Lady of Splendid Countenance (容華; rónghuá)
6. Lady of Beauty (美人; měirén)

During the reign of Emperor Wen:

1. Empress (皇后; huánghòu)
2. Madame (夫人; fūrén)
3. Noble Concubine (貴嬪; guìpín)
4. Lady of Pure Beauty (淑媛; shūyuàn)
5. Lady of Bright Deportment (昭儀; zhāoyí)
6. Lady of Cultivated Countenance (修容; xiūróng)
7. Lady of Handsome Fairness (婕妤; jiéyú)
8. Lady of Splendid Countenance (容華; rónghuá)
9. Lady of Humble Accomplishments (順成; shùnchéng)
10. Lady of Beauty (美人; měirén)
11. Lady of Gentleness (良人; liángrén)

During the reign of Emperor Ming:

1. Empress (皇后; huánghòu)
2. Madame (夫人; fūrén)
3. Noble Concubine (貴嬪; guìpín)
4. Pure Consort (淑妃; shūfēi)
5. Lady of Pure Beauty (淑媛; shūyuàn)
6. Lady of Bright Deportment (昭儀; zhāoyí)
7. Lady of Flowering Luminance (昭華; zhāohuá)
8. Lady of Cultivated Countenance (修容; xiūróng)
9. Lady of Cultivated Deportment (修儀; xiūyí)
10. Lady of Handsome Fairness (婕妤; jiéyú)
11. Lady of Splendid Countenance (傛華; rǒnghuá)
12. Lady of Beauty (美人; měirén)
13. Lady of Gentleness (良人; liángrén)
14. Lady of Value (鹺人; cuórén)

== Jin ==
During the Jin dynasty, the ranks were as follows:

1. 1 Empress (皇后; huánghòu)
2. 3 Madames (夫人; fūrén)
  1. Noble Concubine (貴嬪; guìpín)
  2. Madame (夫人; fūrén)
  3. Noble Lady (貴人; guìrén)
3. 9 Concubines (嬪; pín)
  1. Pure Consort (淑妃; shūfēi)
  2. Lady of Pure Beauty (淑媛; shūyuàn)
  3. Lady of Pure Ceremony (淑儀; shūyí)
  4. Lady of Splendid Cultivation (修華; xiūhuá)
  5. Lady of Cultivated Countenance (修容; xiūróng)
  6. Lady of Cultivated Deportment (修儀; xiūyí)
  7. Lady of Handsome Fairness (婕妤; jiéyú)
  8. Lady of Splendid Countenance (容華; rónghuá)
  9. Lady of Sufficient Splendidness (充華; chōnghuá)
4. Lady of Beauty (美人; měirén)
5. Lady of Talent (才人; cáirén)
6. Lady of Mediocre Talent (中才人; zhōngcáirén)

== Northern and Southern dynasties ==
=== Liu Song ===
1. 1 Empress (皇后; huánghòu)
2. 3 Madames (夫人; fūrén)
  1. Noble Concubine (貴嬪; guìpín)
  2. Madame (夫人; fūrén)
  3. Noble Lady (貴人; guìrén)
3. 9 Concubines (嬪; pín)
  1. Pure Consort (淑妃; shūfēi)
  2. Lady of Pure Beauty (淑媛; shūyuàn)
  3. Lady of Pure Ceremony (淑儀; shūyí)
  4. Lady of Splendid Cultivation (修華; xiūhuá)
  5. Lady of Cultivated Countenance (修容; xiūróng)
  6. Lady of Cultivated Deportment (修儀; xiūyí)
  7. Lady of Handsome Fairness (婕妤; jiéyú)
  8. Lady of Everlasting Splendidness (傛華; yǒnghuá)
  9. Lady of Sufficient Splendidness (充華; chōnghuá)
4. Lady of Beauty (美人; měirén)

From the reign of Emperor Xiaowu:

1. 1 Empress (皇后; huánghòu)
2. 3 Madames (夫人; fūrén)
  1. Noble Consort (貴妃; guìfēi)
  2. Noble Concubine (貴嬪; guìpín)
  3. Noble Lady (貴人; guìrén)
3. 9 Concubines (嬪; pín)
  1. Pure Consort (淑妃; shūfēi)
  2. Lady of Pure Beauty (淑媛; shūyuàn)
  3. Lady of Pure Ceremony (淑儀; shūyí)
  4. Lady of Bright Deportment (昭儀; zhāoyí)
  5. Lady of Bright Countenance (昭容; zhāoróng)
  6. Lady of Flowering Luminance (昭華; zhāohuá)
  7. Lady of Handsome Fairness (婕妤; jiéyú)
  8. Lady of Flowering Countenance (容華; rónghuá)
  9. Lady of Sufficient Splendidness (充華; chōnghuá)
4. Lady of Beauty (美人; měirén)
5. Lady of Mediocre Talent (中才人; zhōngcáirén)
6. Favoured Assistant (充衣; chōngyī)

From the reign of Emperor Ming:

1. 1 Empress (皇后; huánghòu)
2. 3 Madames (夫人; fūrén)
  1. Noble Consort (貴妃; guìfēi)
  2. Noble Concubine (貴嬪; guìpín)
  3. Noble Beauty (貴姬; guìjī)
3. 9 Concubines (嬪; pín)
  1. Lady of Pure Beauty (淑媛; shūyuàn)
  2. Lady of Pure Deportment (淑儀; shūyí)
  3. Lady of Pure Countenance (淑容; shūróng)
  4. Lady of Flowering Luminance (昭華; zhāohuá)
  5. Lady of Bright Deportment (昭儀; zhāoyí)
  6. Lady of Bright Countenance (昭容; zhāoróng)
  7. Lady of Cultivated Splendidness (修華; xiūhuá)
  8. Lady of Cultivated Deportment (修儀; xiūyí)
  9. Lady of Cultivated Countenance (修容; xiūróng)
4. 5 Post Holders (職; zhí)
  1. Lady of Handsome Fairness (婕妤; jiéyú)
  2. Lady of Flowering Countenance (容華; rónghuá)
  3. Lady of Sufficient Splendidness (充華; chōnghuá)
  4. Lady of Inherit Glory (承徽; chénghuī)
  5. Lady of Propitious Honour (列榮; lièróng)
5. Lady of Beauty (美人; měirén)
6. Lady of Mediocre Talent (中才人; zhōngcáirén)
7. Lady of Talent (才人; cáirén)
8. Lady of Gentleness (良人; liángrén)
9. Favoured Assistant (充衣; chōngyī)

=== Southern Qi ===
From the reign of Emperor Gao:

1. 1 Empress (皇后; huánghòu)
2. 3 Madames (夫人; fūrén)
  1. Noble Concubine (貴嬪; guìpín)
  2. Madame (夫人; fūrén)
  3. Noble Lady (貴人; guìrén)
3. 9 Concubines (嬪; pín)
  1. Lady of Splendid Cultivation (修華; xiūhuá)
  2. Lady of Cultivated Deportment (修儀; xiūyí)
  3. Lady of Cultivated Countenance (修容; xiūróng)
  4. Pure Consort (淑妃; shūfēi)
  5. Lady of Pure Beauty (淑媛; shūyuàn)
  6. Lady of Pure Deportment (淑儀; shūyí)
  7. Lady Handsome Fairness (婕妤; jiéyú)
  8. Lady of Flowering Countenance (容華; rónghuá)
  9. Lady of Sufficient Splendidness (充華; chōnghuá)
4. Lady of Beauty (美人; měirén)
5. Lady of Mediocre Talent (中才人; zhōngcáirén)
6. Lady of Talent (才人; cáirén)

In 483, when Emperor Wu ascended to the throne, the positions of noble consort (貴妃; guìfēi) and pure consort (淑妃; shūfēi) were elevated to independent categories, just beneath the empress. In 489, the position of lady of bright countenance (昭容; zhāoróng) was added to fill the gap created upon the elevation of pure consort (淑妃; shūfēi).

The crown prince:

1. Bride of Excellence (良娣; liángdì)
2. Lady Who Can Safeguard a Multitude (保林; bǎolín)
3. Lady of Talent (才人; cáirén)

=== Liang ===
During the reign of Emperor Wu:

1. 1 Empress (皇后; huánghòu)
2. 3 Madames (夫人; fūrén)
  1. Noble Consort (貴妃; guìfēi)
  2. Noble Concubine (貴嬪; guìpín)
  3. Noble Beauty (貴姬; guìjī)
3. 9 Concubines (嬪; pín)
  1. Lady of Pure Beauty (淑媛; shūyuàn)
  2. Lady of Pure Deportment (淑儀; shūyí)
  3. Lady of Pure Countenance (淑容; shūróng)
  4. Lady of Flowering Brightness (昭華; zhāohuá)
  5. Lady of Bright Countenance (昭容; zhāoróng)
  6. Lady of Bright Deportment (昭儀; zhāoyí)
  7. Lady of Cultivated Splendidness (修華; xiūhuá)
  8. Lady of Cultivated Deportment (修儀; xiūyí)
  9. Lady of Cultivated Countenance (修容; xiūróng)
4. 5 Post Holders (職; zhí)
  1. Lady of Handsome Fairness (婕妤; jiéyú)
  2. Lady of Flowering Countenance (容華; rónghuá)
  3. Lady of Sufficient Splendidness (充華; chōnghuá)
  4. Lady of Inherit Glory (承徽; chénghuī)
  5. Lady of Propitious Honour (列榮; lièróng)
5. Lady of Beauty (美人; měirén)
6. Lady of Gentleness (良人; liángrén)
7. Lady of Talent (才人; cáirén)

The crown prince:

1. Bride of Excellence (良娣; liángdì)
2. Lady Who Can Safeguard a Multitude (保林; bǎolín)

=== Chen ===
Initially, during the reign of Emperor Wu, no specific ranking system for imperial consorts were devised, due to his desire to live a simple life. It was only during Emperor Wen's reign that a ranking system came into being:

1. 1 Empress (皇后; huánghòu)
2. 3 Madames (夫人; fūrén)
  1. Noble Consort (貴妃; guìfēi)
  2. Noble Concubine (貴嬪; guìpín)
  3. Noble Beauty (貴姬; guìjī)
3. 9 Concubines (嬪; pín)
  1. Lady of Pure Beauty (淑媛; shūyuàn)
  2. Lady of Pure Deportment (淑儀; shūyí)
  3. Lady of Pure Countenance (淑容; shūróng)
  4. Lady of Flowering Brightness (昭華; zhāohuá)
  5. Lady of Bright Countenance (昭容; zhāoróng)
  6. Lady of Bright Deportment (昭儀; zhāoyí)
  7. Lady of Cultivated Splendidness (修華; xiūhuá)
  8. Lady of Cultivated Deportment (修儀; xiūyí)
  9. Lady of Cultivated Countenance (修容; xiūróng)
4. 5 Post Holders (職; zhí)
  1. Lady of Handsome Fairness (婕妤; jiéyú)
  2. Lady of Flowering Countenance (容華; rónghuá)
  3. Lady of Sufficient Splendidness (充華; chōnghuá)
  4. Lady of Inherit Glory (承徽; chénghuī)
  5. Lady of Propitious Honour (列榮; lièróng)
5. Lady of Beauty (美人; měirén)
6. Lady of Talent (才人; cáirén)
7. Lady of Gentleness (良人; liángrén)

=== Northern Wei ===
During the reign of Emperor Daowu, the ranking system was very simple, and only contained the rank of madame (夫人; fūrén). However, there existed an unwritten, subjective system of prestige. It was during the reign of Emperor Taiwu that the system listed below came into existence:

1. Empress (皇后; huánghòu)
2. Left Lady of Bright Deportment (左昭儀; zuǒzhāoyí)
  Right Lady of Bright Deportment (右昭儀; yòuzhāoyí)
3. Noble Lady (貴人; guìrén)
4. Lady of the Pepper Chamber (椒房; jiāofáng)
5. Passing Attendant (中式; zhōngshì)

During the sinicization of Northern Wei, Emperor Xiaowen reformed the ranking system to the system below:

1. 1 Empress (皇后; huánghòu)
2. Left Lady of Bright Deportment (左昭儀; zuǒzhāoyí)
  Right Lady of Bright Deportment (右昭儀; yòuzhāoyí)
3. 3 Madames (夫人; fūrén)
4. Third Concubine (三嬪; sānpín)
5. Sixth Concubine (六嬪; liùpín)
6. Hereditary Lady (世婦; shìfù)
7. Imperial Wife (御妻; yùqī)

=== Northern Qi ===
In the beginning, there were only three ranks:

1. Madame (夫人; fūrén)
2. Concubine (嬪; pín)
3. Lady (禦; yù)

From the reign of Emperor Wucheng:

1. 1 Empress (皇后; huánghòu)
2. 1 Left Lady of Beautiful Blooming (左娥英; zuǒéyīng)
  1 Right Lady of Beautiful Blooming (右娥英; yòuéyīng)
3. 1 Pure Consort (淑妃; shūfēi)
4. 1 Left Lady of Bright Deportment (左昭儀; zuǒzhāoyí)
  1 Right Lady of Bright Deportment (右昭儀; yòuzhāoyí)
5. 3 Madames (夫人; fūrén)
  1. Madame of Great Moral (弘德; hóngdé)
  2. Madame of Just Moral (正德; zhèngdé)
  3. Madame of High Moral (崇德; chóngdé)
6. Upper Concubines (上嬪; shàngpín)
  1. Upper Concubine of Great Honor (隆徽; lónghuī)
  2. Upper Concubine of Light Plan (光猷; guāngyóu)
  3. Upper Concubine of Bright Instruction (昭訓; zhāoxùn)
7. Lower Concubines (下嬪; xiàpín)
  1. Lower Concubine of Proclaimed Honor (宣徽; xuānhuī)
  2. Lower Concubine of Proclaimed Brightness (宣明; xuānmíng)
  3. Lower Concubine of Congealed Brightness (凝暉; nínghuī)
  4. Lower Concubine of Congealed Splendidness (凝華; nínghuá)
  5. Lower Concubine of Conducive Splendidness (順華; shùnhuá)
  6. Lower Concubine of Light Instruction (光訓; guāngxùn)
8. 27 Hereditary Ladies (世婦; shìfù)
9. Lady of Talent (才人; cáirén)
10. Selected Lady (採女; cǎinǚ)

=== Northern Zhou ===
1. 1 Empress (皇后; huánghòu)
2. 3 Madames (夫人; fūrén), later 3 Consorts (妃; fēi)
  1. Noble Consort (貴妃; guìfēi)
  2. Great Noble Consort (長貴妃; zhǎngguìfēi)
  3. Virtuous Consort (德妃; défēi)
3. 3 Lady Officials (㚤; yì)
4. 6 Concubines (嬪; pín)
  1. Lady of Bright Splendidness (昭化; zhāohuà)
5. Lady of Imperial Beauty (禦媛; yùyuàn)
  1. Lady of Upper Beauty (上媛; shàngyuàn)
  2. Lady of Middle Beauty (中媛; zhōngyuàn)
  3. Lady of Lower Beauty (下媛; xiàyuàn)
6. Lady of Imperial Gracefulness (禦婉; yùwǎn')
  1. Lady of Upper Gracefulness (上婉; shàngwǎn)
  2. Lady of Middle Gracefulness (中婉; zhōngwǎn)
  3. Lady of Lower Gracefulness (下婉; xiàwǎn)

During the reign of Emperor Xuan, five empresses were created (unprecedented by Chinese standards):

1. Yang Lihua (楊麗華), Primary Great Heavenly Empress (天元大皇后; tiānyuándàhuánghòu)
2. Zhu Manyue (朱滿月), Great Heavenly Empress (天大皇后; tiāndàhuánghòu)
3. Chen Yueyi (陳月儀), Great Central Heavenly Empress (天中大皇后; tiānzhōngdàhuánghòu)
4. Yuchi Chifan (尉遲熾繁), Great Left Heavenly Empress (天左大皇后; tiānzuǒdàhuánghòu')
5. Yuan Leshang (元樂尚), Great Right Heavenly Empress (天右大皇后; tiānyòudàhuánghòu)

In addition, there was an innumerable number of women in the palace.

== Sui ==
At the beginning of the Sui dynasty, there existed a simple system of ranking:

1. 1 Empress (皇后; huánghòu)
2. 4 Concubines (嬪; pín)
3. 9 Hereditary Ladies (世婦; shìfù)
4. 38 Ladies of His Majesty (禦女; yùnǚ)

There also existed a system of female palace officers (女官; nǚguān) to manage ceremonial affairs in the inner palace. The system was based on similar systems of the past.

After the death of Empress Dugu, Emperor Wen expanded the ranks to the following:

1. 1 Empress (皇后; huánghòu)
2. 3 Noble Ladies (貴人; guìrén)
3. 9 Concubines (嬪; pín)
4. 27 Hereditary Ladies (世婦; shìfù)
5. 81 Ladies of His Majesty (禦女; yùnǚ)

During the reign of Emperor Yang, the ranking system was expanded yet again:

1. 1 Empress (皇后; huánghòu)
2. 3 Consorts (妃; fēi')
  1. Noble Consort (貴妃; guìfēi)
  2. Pure Consort (淑妃; shūfēi)
  3. Virtuous Consort (德妃; défēi)
3. 9 Concubines (嬪; pín)
  1. Lady of Conducive Wellness (順儀; shùnyí)
  2. Lady of Supportive Wellness (順容; shùnróng)
  3. Lady of Splendid Wellness (順華; shùnhuá)
  4. Lady of Cultivated Deportment (修儀; xiūyí)
  5. Lady of Cultivated Countenance (修容; xiūróng)
  6. Lady of Cultivated Splendidness (修華; xiūhuá)
  7. Lady of Complete Deportment (充儀; chōngyī)
  8. Lady of Complete Countenance (充容; chōngróng)
  9. Lady of Complete Splendidness (充華; chōnghuá)
4. 12 Ladies Handsome Fairness (婕妤; jiéyú)
5. 15 Hereditary Ladies (世婦; shìfù)
  1. Lady of Beauty (美人; měirén)
  2. Lady of Talent (才人; cáirén)
6. 24 Ladies of Treasure (寶林; bǎolín)
7. 24 Ladies of His Majesty (禦女; yùnǚ')
8. 37 Ladies of Elegance (採女; cǎinǚ)

== Tang ==
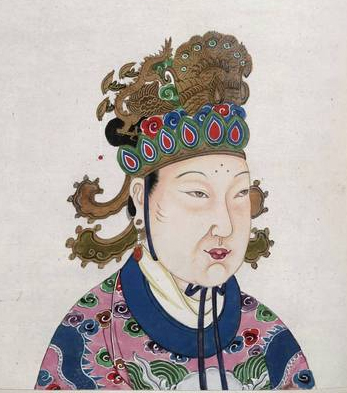
Empress Wu, better known as Wu Zetian, was a consort of Emperors Taizong and Gaozong, as well as the only female emperor in Chinese history

Imperial consorts of the Tang dynasty were organized in eight or nine ranks, in addition to the empress. They were also called the "inner officials" (內官; nèiguān), as opposed to "palace officials" (宮官; gōngguān), the bureaucracy.

1. 1 Empress (皇后; huánghòu)
2. 4 Consorts (妃; fēi)
  1. Noble Consort (貴妃; guìfēi)
  2. Pure Consort (淑妃; shūfēi)
  3. Virtuous Consort (德妃; défēi)
  4. Worthy Consort (賢妃; xiánfēi)
3. 9 Concubines (嬪; pín)
  1. Lady of Bright Deportment (昭儀; zhāoyí)
  2. Lady of Bright Countenance (昭容; zhāoróng)
  3. Lady of Bright Beauty (昭媛; zhāoyuàn)
  4. Lady of Cultivated Deportment (修儀; xiūyí)
  5. Lady of Cultivated Countenance (修容; xiūróng)
  6. Lady of Cultivated Beauty (修媛; xiūyuàn)
  7. Lady of Complete Deportment (充儀; chōngyí)
  8. Lady of Complete Countenance (充容; chōngróng)
  9. Lady of Complete Beauty (充媛; chōngyuàn)
4. 9 Ladies of Handsome Fairness (婕妤; jiéyú)
5. 9 Ladies of Beauty (美人; měirén)
6. 9 Ladies of Talent (才人; cáirén)
7. 27 Ladies of Treasure (寶林; bǎolín)
8. 27 Ladies of His Majesty (禦女; yùnǚ)
9. 27 Selected Ladies (採女; cǎinǚ)

During the reign of Emperor Gaozong:

1. 1 Empress (皇后; huánghòu)
2. 4 Consorts (妃; fēi)
  1. Noble Consort (貴妃; guìfēi)
  2. Pure Consort (淑妃; shūfēi)
  3. Virtuous Consort (德妃; défēi)
  4. Worthy Consort (賢妃; xiánfēi)
3. 9 Concubines (嬪; pín)
  1. Lady of Bright Deportment (昭儀; zhāoyí)
  2. Lady of Bright Countenance (昭容; zhāoróng)
  3. Lady of Bright Beauty (昭媛; zhāoyuàn)
  4. Lady of Cultivated Deportment (修儀; xiūyí)
  5. Lady of Cultivated Countenance (修容; xiūróng)
  6. Lady of Cultivated Beauty (修媛; xiūyuàn)
  7. Lady of Complete Deportment (充儀; chōngyí)
  8. Lady of Complete Countenance (充容; chōngróng)
  9. Lady of Complete Beauty (充媛; chōngyuàn)
4. 9 Ladies of Handsome Fairness (婕妤; jiéyú)
5. 9 Ladies of Beauty (美人; měirén)
6. 9 Ladies of Talent (才人; cáirén)

Emperor Gaozong wanted to create and promote Lady Wu, who was then ranked as Lady Wu of Bright Deportment (武昭儀; Wū Zhāoyí) to Royal Consort (宸妃; chēnfei) because the 4 ranks of consorts were already occupied. The court officials opposed this idea, saying that it was unprecedented; the emperor can only have four consorts and the character chēn (宸) was used to refer the power of the emperor. Emperor Gaozong would not carry out his plan. In 662, the titles were temporarily changed to be devoid of feminine quality. This seemingly feminist change was reverted in the twelfth month of 670. The rationales were not explained in official records in both instances. However, some scholars have speculated it to be the suggestion of Empress Wu to her husband.

Rank	Old titles	New titles
1a	Consort (妃; fēi)	Patroness in Virtue (贊德; zàndé)
2a	Concubine (嬪; pín)	Propagator of Deportment (宣儀; xuānyí)
3a	Lady Handsome Fairness (婕妤; jiéyú)	Recipient from the Inner Chamber (承閨; chéngguī)
4a	Lady of Beauty (美人; měirén)	Recipient of Edicts (承旨; chéngzhǐ)
5a	Lady of Talent (才人; cáirén)	Guardian Immortal (衛仙; wèixiān)
6a	Lady of Treasure (寶林; bǎolín)	Consecrated Provider (供奉; gòngfèng)
7a	Lady of His Majesty (御女; yùnǚ)	Coiffure Attendant (恃櫛; shìzhì)
8a	Selected Lady (采女; cǎinǚ)	Towel Attendant (恃巾; shìjīn)

From the reign of Emperor Xuanzong:

1. 1 Empress (皇后; huánghòu)
2. 3 Consorts (妃; fēi)
  1. Consort of Conferred Kindness (惠妃; huìfēi)
  2. Magnificent Consort (麗妃; lìfēi)
  3. Splendid Consort (華妃; huáfēi)
3. 6 Ladies of Ceremony (儀; yí)
  1. Lady of Pure Ceremony (淑儀; shūyí)
  2. Lady of Virtuous Ceremony (德儀; déyí)
  3. Lady of Worthy Ceremony (賢儀; xiányí)
  4. Lady of Conducive Ceremony (順儀; shùnyí)
  5. Lady of Graceful Ceremony (婉儀; wǎnyí)
  6. Lady of Fragrant Ceremony (芳儀; fāngyí)
4. 4 Ladies of Beauty (美人; měirén)
5. 7 Ladies of Talent (才人; cáirén)

The crown prince:

1. Crown Princess (太子妃; tàizǐfēi)
2. 2 Ladies of Excellence (良娣; liángdì)
3. 6 Ladies of Filial Excellence (良嬡; liángyuàn)
4. 10 Ladies of Inherent Excellence (承徽; chénghuī)
5. 16 Ladies of Clear Instruction (昭訓; zhāoxùn)
6. 24 Ladies of Decorous Service (奉儀; fèngyí)

== Five Dynasties and Ten Kingdoms ==
During the Five Dynasties and Ten Kingdoms, governments were replaced frequently, and as a result, it is difficult for modern scholars to derive any solid information on ranking systems during these times.

However, it is known that the Later Tang used the following system:

1. Lady of Bright Countenance (昭容; zhāoróng)
2. Lady of Bright Deportment (昭儀; zhāoyí)
3. Lady of Bright Beauty (昭媛; zhāoyuàn)
4. Missionary Lady (出使; chūshǐ)
5. First Lady of His Majesty (禦正; yùzhèng)
6. True Servant (侍眞; shìzhēn)
7. Lady of Honorable Talent (懿才; yìcái)
8. Lady of Unity (咸一; xiányī)
9. Precious Flower (瑤芳; yáofāng)
10. Lady of Honorable Moral (懿德; yìdé)
11. Lady of Promise (宣一; xuānyī)

Whether there were any limits to the holders of these titles are unknown.

== Song, Liao, Jin ==
=== Song ===
1. 1 Empress (皇后; huánghòu)
2. 4 Consorts (妃; fēi)
  1. Noble Consort (貴妃; guìfēi)
  2. Pure Consort (淑妃; shūfēi)
  3. Virtuous Consort (德妃; défēi)
  4. Able Consort (賢妃; xiánfēi)
  5. Imperial Consort (宸妃; chénfēi), created by Emperor Renzong
3. Concubine (嬪; pín)
  1. Lady of Highest Ceremony (太儀; tàiyí)
  2. Lady of Noble Ceremony (貴儀; guìyí)
  3. Lady of Imperial Ceremony (妃儀; fēiyí)
  4. Lady of Warm Ceremony (淑儀; shūyí)
  5. Lady of Graceful Ceremony (婉儀; wǎnyí)
  6. Lady of Conducive Ceremony (順儀; shùnyí)
  7. Lady of Conducive Appearance (順容; shùnróng)
  8. Lady of Warm Appearance (淑容; shūróng)
  9. Lady of Graceful Appearance (婉容; wǎnróng)
  10. Lady of Bright Deportment (昭儀; zhāoyí)
  11. Lady of Bright Countenance (昭容; zhāoróng)
  12. Lady of Bright Beauty (昭媛; zhāoyuàn)
  13. Lady of Cultivated Deportment (修儀; xiūyí)
  14. Lady of Cultivated Countenance (修容; xiūróng)
  15. Lady of Cultivated Beauty (修媛; xiūyuàn)
  16. Lady of Complete Deportment (充儀; chōngyí')
  17. Lady of Complete Countenance(充容; chōngróng)
  18. Lady of Complete Beauty (充媛; chōngyuàn)
4. Lady of Handsome Fairness (婕妤; jiéyú)
5. Lady of Beauty (美人; měirén)
6. Lady of Talent (才人; cáirén)
7. Noble Lady (貴人; guìrén)

=== Liao ===
1. 1 Empress (皇后; huánghòu)
2. 2 Ladies of Beautiful Ceremony (麗儀; lìyí)
3. 3 Ladies of Warm Ceremony (淑儀; shūyí)
4. 4 Ladies of Bright Ceremony (昭儀; zhāoyí)
5. 5 Ladies of Conducive Ceremony (順儀; shùnyí)
6. 6 Ladies of Fragrant Ceremony (芳儀; fāngyí)
7. 7 Ladies of Peaceful Ceremony (和儀; héyí)

=== Jin ===
1. 1 Empress (皇后; huánghòu)
2. 2 Primary Consorts (元妃; yuánfēi)
3. 4 Consorts (妃; fēi)
  1. Noble Consort (貴妃; guìfēi)
  2. Pure Consort (淑妃; shūfēi)
  3. Virtuous Consort (德妃; défēi)
  4. Able Consort (賢妃; xiánfēi)
4. 9 Concubines (嬪; pín)
  1. Lady of Bright Deportment (昭儀; zhāoyí)
  2. Lady of Bright Countenance (昭容; zhāoróng)
  3. Lady of Bright Beauty (昭媛; zhāoyuàn)
  4. Lady of Cultivated Deportment (修儀; xiūyí)
  5. Lady of Cultivated Countenance (修容; xiūróng)
  6. Lady of Cultivated Beauty (修媛; xiūyuàn)
  7. Lady of Complete Deportment (充儀; chōngyí)
  8. Lady of Complete Countenance (充容; chōngróng)
  9. Lady of Complete Beauty (充媛; chōngyuàn)
5. 9 Ladies of Handsome Fairness (婕妤; jiéyú)
6. 9 Ladies of Beauty (美人; měirén)
7. 9 Ladies of Talent (才人; cáirén)
8. 27 Ladies of Treasure (寶林; bǎolín)
9. 27 Ladies of His Majesty (禦女; yùnǚ)
10. 27 Selected Ladies (採女; cǎinǚ)

== Yuan ==
The Yuan dynasty ranking system was at its simplest, and only consisted of empress, consort, and concubine. While there was only one empress at a time, there were no limits on the number of consorts or concubines.

Although the number of ranks were few, there existed a sub-system of ranking by prestige inside the Yuan harem. An imperial consort's tent (Chinese: 宮帳; gōngzhàng; translated from the Mongolian term for yurts: 斡兒垜; wòérkàng) determined her status; multiple women often lived in the same one. In the many tents that existed, the imperial consort of the first tent was considered to be the most prestigious woman.

As with all parts of the Mongol Empire, Goryeo provided women to the Yuan dynasty. One of them was Empress Gi, who, through her political command and incorporation of Korean females and eunuchs in the court, spread Korean clothing, food, and lifestyle in the capital. The entry of Korean women into the Yuan court was reciprocated by the entry of Yuan princesses into the Goryeo court, beginning with the marriage of King Chungnyeol and a daughter of Kublai Khan; in total, nine princesses of the Yuan imperial family married into the Goryeo royal family.

Emperor Gong of Song surrendered to the Mongols in 1276 and was married off to a Yuan princess of the Borjigin clan; they had one son, Zhao Wanpu, who was only exiled after Emperor Gong's death due to his mother's ancestry. Paul Pelliot and John Andrew Boyle identified references to Zhao Xian in The Successors of Genghis Khan chapter of Rashid al-Din Hamadani's Jami' al-tawarikh; he mentions a Chinese ruler who was an "emir" and son-in-law to the "qan" (khan) after being removed from his throne by the Mongols and he is also called "monarch of Song" (宋主; sòngzhŭ) in the book.

== Ming ==
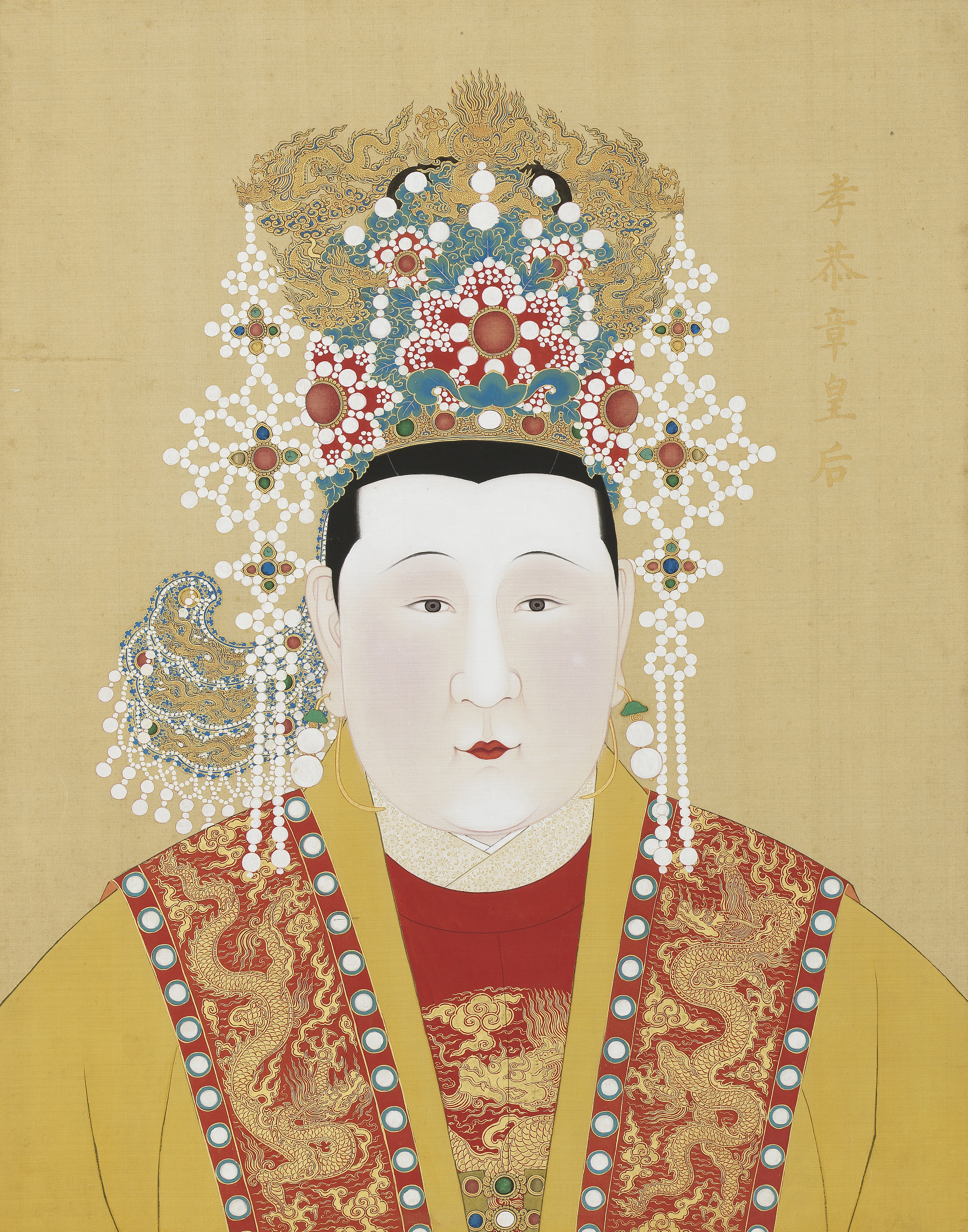
Empress Sun, better known as Empress Xiaogongzhang, was the second empress of the Xuande Emperor.

The Ming dynasty system was simple with five commonly used ranks:

1. Empress (皇后; huánghòu)
2. Imperial Noble Consort (皇貴妃; huángguìfēi)
3. Noble Consort (貴妃; guìfēi)
4. Consort (妃; fēi)
5. Concubine (嬪; pín)

Other known titles:

1. Lady of Handsome Fairness (婕妤; jiéyú)
2. Lady of Bright Deportment (昭儀; zhāoyí)
3. Lady of Bright Countenance (昭容; zhāoróng)
4. Noble Lady (貴人; guìrén)
5. Lady of Beauty (美人; měirén)

For the crown prince:

1. Crown Princess (太子妃; tàizǐfēi)
2. Lady of Talent (才人; cáirén)
3. Lady of Selected Service (選侍; xuǎnshì)
4. Woman of Gentleness (淑女; shūnǚ)

Human tribute, including servants, eunuchs, and virgin girls came from China's various ethnic tribes, as well as Mongolia, Korea, Vietnam, Cambodia, Central Asia, Siam, Champa, and Okinawa.

Joseon sent a total of 114 women to the Ming dynasty, consisting of 16 virgin girls (accompanied by 48 female servants), 42 cooks, and 8 performers. The women were sent to the Yongle and Xuande emperors in a total of seven missions between 1408 and 1433. Xuande was the last Ming emperor to receive human tribute from Korea; with his death in 1435, 53 Korean women were repatriated. There was much speculation that the Yongle Emperor's real mother was a Korean or Mongolian concubine. Relations between Ming China and Joseon Korea improved dramatically and became much more amicable and mutually profitable during Yongle's reign. Both Yongle and Xuande are said to have had a penchant for Korean cuisine and women.

Central Asian concubines, mostly of Uighur and Mongol origin, were provided to the Zhengde Emperor by a Muslim guard and Sayyid Hussein from Hami. The speculation about Zhengde becoming a Muslim is remembered alongside his excessive and debauched behavior with his concubines of foreign origin. Muslim Central Asian women were favored by Zhengde like how Korean women were favored by Yongle and Xuande.

== Qing ==
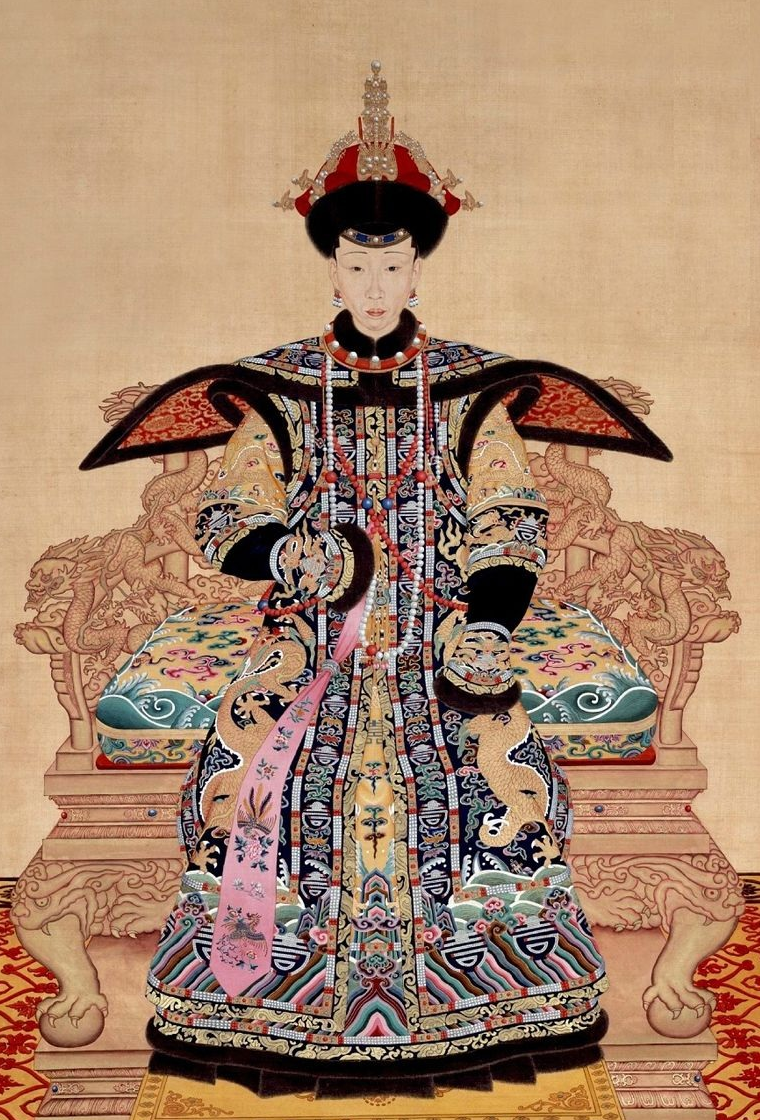
Empress Xiaoyichun, better known as Consort Ling, was the third empress of the Qianlong Emperor

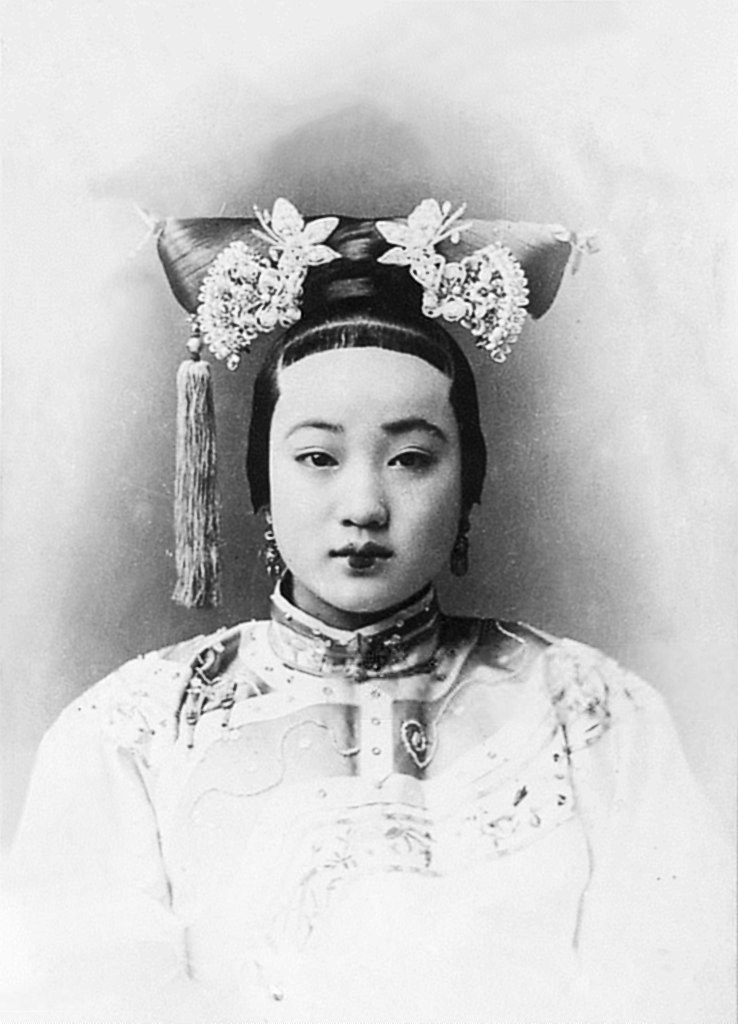
Imperial Noble Consort Keshun, better known as Consort Zhen or popularly as the Pearl Consort, was an imperial consort of the Guangxu Emperor

The Qing dynasty system was one of the simplest systems in Chinese history. Officially, there were eight ranks:

1. Empress (皇后; huánghòu)
2. Imperial Noble Consort (皇貴妃; huángguìfēi)
3. Noble Consort (貴妃; guìfēi)
4. Consort (妃; fēi)
5. Concubine (嬪; pín)
6. Noble Lady (貴人; guìrén)
7. First Class Attendant (常在; chángzài)
8. Second Class Attendant (答應; dāyìng)

Lady-in-waiting (官女子; guānnǘzǐ) was typically used to refer the palace maids who has been favored by the emperor and were kept at his side but without a formal/proper title. It was not part of the official ranking.

The system was solid, but the number of imperial consorts an emperor actually had during the Qing dynasty is subject to wild variations. The Kangxi Emperor holds the record for having the most imperial consorts with 79, while the Guangxu Emperor holds the record for having the fewest, with one empress and two consorts, a total of three imperial consorts.

There were limits placed on how many imperial consorts could hold the ranks of concubine and above. An emperor could have one empress, one imperial noble consort, two noble consorts, four consorts and six concubines at a time. The ranks of noble lady, first class attendant and second class attendant were unlimited.

An imperial consort who had attained the rank of concubine or above would be given a residence in the main section of a palace in the inner court of the Forbidden City and become its mistress (主位; zhǔwèi), while imperial consorts holding the three lower ranks could only live in the side rooms of the palaces.

Imperial consorts of concubine rank and above could ride in sedan chairs. The empress' entourage was called yíjià (仪驾), the imperial noble consort and noble consorts' entourage was called yízhàng (仪仗), and the consorts and concubines' entourage was called cǎizhàng (彩仗).

The empress was the only wife of the emperor, while his other women were considered concubines. The empress' children were the legitimate heirs and they had a higher chance of inheriting the throne.

When the crown prince ascended to the throne, he was allowed to posthumously promote his late consorts (even the consorts of the late emperor) in the ranks. A primary consort could be honored as empress, while secondary consorts and mistresses could be elevated to any of the seven other ranks (from second class attendant to imperial noble consort).

A posthumous name (谥号; shìhào) was given to empresses and imperial noble consorts after their deaths. The total characters in an empress' posthumous name was 16 while, there were 2 characters in an imperial noble consort's. The initial character of an empress' posthumous name was always 孝 (xiào), meaning "filial", and the final character was the emperor's own posthumous name. The posthumous name given to an imperial noble consort used her honorific name (封号; fēnghào) and added another character (either initial or final).

An emperor would be careful when promoting an imperial consort to the rank of imperial noble consort because this rank was considered a deputy empress (副后; fùhòu). As such, the promotions mostly happened when an imperial consort (usually a noble consort) was hopelessly ill and the emperor wanted to console her (it was believed that a promotion was a blessing and could aid in dispelling the sickness), when the empress needed someone to assist her in managing the inner court or when the empress was dead and someone else was needed to manage the inner court.

An empress who outlived her husband would become empress dowager (皇太后; huángtàihòu) and would be known as imperial mother, empress dowager (母后皇太后; mŭhòu huángtàihòu). In the cases when the new emperor's birth mother was one of the former emperor's imperial consorts, she would also become empress dowager and would be known as holy mother, empress dowager (聖母皇太后; shèngmŭ huángtàihòu), as well as being posthumously honored as empress. An empress who lived through the reigns of at least two subsequent emperors would be called grand empress dowager (太皇太后; tàihuángtàihòu).

The other imperial consorts of the former emperor would be addressed as dowager (太; tài) according to their rank, but it was not required. A concubine would be called dowager concubine (太嬪; tàipín), a consort would be called dowager consort (太妃; tàifēi), a noble consort would be called dowager noble consort (貴太妃; guìtàifēi), and an imperial noble consort would be called dowager imperial noble consort (皇貴太妃; huángguìtàifēi). The empress and imperial consorts were expected to pay respect to the elders who held the positions above. However, the former emperor's low-ranked imperial consorts (noble lady, first class attendant and second class attendant) would simply be referred to as palace woman of the late emperor (先帝宮女; xiāndì gōngnü).

A prince's harem consists of only three ranks:

1. Primary Consort (嫡福晋; dífújìn)
2. Secondary Consort (侧福晋; cèfújìn)
3. Mistress (格格; gégé)

As the primary consort was the only wife of a prince, only one woman could hold this position, while there could be two secondary consorts at a time and there wasn't a limit on the number of mistresses a prince could have.
