= Chung Young Yang Embroidery Museum =

Museum in Seoul, South Korea

- Established: 2004
- Location: Sookmyung Women's University, Seoul, South Korea
- Coordinates: 37.5448°N 126.9641°E
- Website: home.sookmyung.ac.kr/sites/chungyoungyang/index.do

Korean name
- Hangul: 정영양 자수 박물관
- Hanja: 鄭英陽 刺繡 博物館
- RR: Jeong Yeongyang jasu bangmulgwan
- MR: Chŏng Yŏngyang chasu pangmulgwan

The Chung Young Yang Embroidery Museum (Korean: 정영양 자수 박물관) is a textile museum in Seoul, South Korea.

It was founded by Dr. Young Yang Chung and inaugurated in May 2004 by Sookmyung Women's University. It was closed for renovations from December 2017 until 2019, and is running exhibitions as of late 2025.

Its exhibits are not limited to Korean embroidery; there are also items from other areas in East Asia (notably Chinese embroidery on imperial robes) and elsewhere.

== See also ==
- Han Sang Soo Embroidery Museum, also in Seoul
