= Won-sik =

Korean given name

- Hangul: 원식
- RR: Wonsik
- MR: Wŏnsik

Won-sik, also spelled Won-shik, is a Korean given name.

- Min Won-sik (1886–1921), Joseon Dynasty official and journalist
- Im Won-sik (1919–2002), Korean conductor, composer, and musical pedagogue
- Chung Won-shik (born 1928), South Korean politician, 23rd Prime Minister
- Woo Won-shik (born 1957), South Korean politician with the Minjoo Party of Korea
- Lee Won-shik (born 1973), South Korean footballer
- Kim Won-sik (born 1991), South Korean footballer
- Ravi (rapper) (born Kim Won-shik, 1993), South Korean singer and rapper, ex-member of boy band VIXX

== See also ==
- List of Korean given names
