= Min Wŏnsik =

Korean writer and politician (1886–1921)

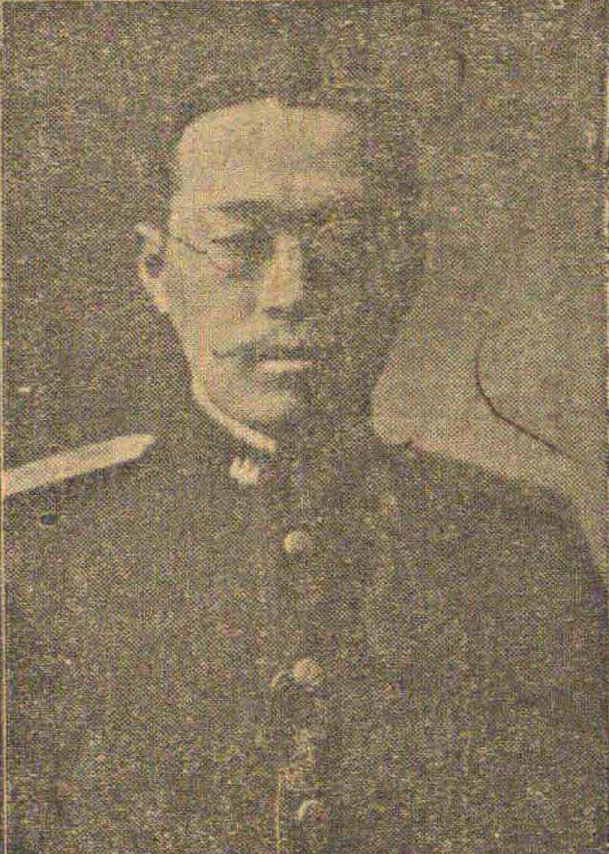
- Min Wŏnsik, 1913
- Born: July 12, 1886; Yangpyeong County, Gyeonggi Province, Joseon
- Died: February 17, 1921 (aged 34); Tokyo, Empire of Japan
- Cause of death: Assassination
- Resting place: Gaeunsa, Anam, Seoul, South Korea
- Occupations: Korean politician and political rights of Korean activists and right of autonomy of Korean activists.
- Spouse: Eom Chae-deok (m. 1906–1921)
- Children: 1 daughter 1 adoptive son
- Father: Min Young-jun
- Relatives: Min Young-ok (adoptive father) Empress Myeongseong Empress Sunmyeong Queen Inhyeon Min Young-hwan Min Yeong-chan
- Family: Yeoheung Min

Min Wŏnsik (Korean: 민원식; Hanja: 閔元植, July 12, 1886 – February 17, 1921) was a politician and journalist during the late Joseon dynasty and the Japanese colonial era. He was an advocate for Korean political rights and autonomy. Also a noted writer and poet, he used the art names of Chŏngam (정암; 正菴), Nan'gok (난곡; 蘭谷), Handong (한동; 韓東), and Yangha (양하; 養何).

Min believed in the Japanese support of Korean interests. Until his assassination, he supported a system of Korean autonomy within the Japanese imperial system.

== Biography ==
=== Under the Korean Empire ===
Min was born in Yangpyeong County, Gyeonggi Province, Joseon. His real father was Min Young-jun, but he was adopted by a relative, Min Young-woo ( real name Min Young-ok). His family belonged to the Yeoheung Min clan, a famous noble family of the Joseon period, and he was distantly related to Empress Myeongseong and Empress Sunmyeong. It was said that his family was poor for a while. He married Eom Chae-deok in October 1906, after his first wife died, who was a niece of Imperial Noble Consort Sunheon of the Yeongwol Eom clan; King Gojong's concubine.

In 1899, Min went to Japan to teach Korean language at the East Asia Foreign Language School (동아어학교). In February 1905, he returned to Korea and was appointed to a police post (Gyeongmucheong Chongsun (경무청 총순; 警務廳總巡), but he resigned after a year. Under the Japanese protectorate over Korea, he was rapidly promoted under the sponsorship of Ito Hirobumi and Hasegawa Yoshimichi, later becoming Secretary of the Ministry of Interior in July 1906, and Hygiene manager of the Bureau of Health and Sanitation within the Ministry of Interior in August 1906. As part of his efforts to improve the control of infectious diseases and hygiene in Korea, he introduced a system of state-regulated prostitution with mandatory testing for venereal disease.

In March 1907, he was appointed as acting director of the hospital Gwangjewon (광제원 廣濟院). From April 1 to 25, 1907, he was appointed as the director of Gwangjewon hospital, with a concurrent position as the Hygiene Department Director of the Ministry of Internal Affairs.

On January 1, 1910, he took office as CEO of Sisa Sinmun. In 1910, he joined Club Jeongwu (정우회), a political club of Japanophilism.

=== Under the Japanese general government ===
In 1910, after the annexation of Korea by Japan, Min served on the Central Advisory Institute of the Governor-General of Korea. From the beginning of the Japanese period, Min argued for increased Korean autonomy and political rights within the Japanese Empire. In July 1911, he was appointed Governor of Yangji County, and in March 1914, he was appointed Governor of Icheon County. On several occasions, he petitioned the Japanese Governor-General for Korean suffrage, but his petitions were rejected. From 1915 to 1917, Min served as Commissioner of the Land Survey Committee of Gyeonggi Province, and in September 1917, he was appointed Governor of Goyang County. In 1919, he spoke out against the March First Movement, believing that Korean independence at that time was impossible. He thought that the Korean independence movement only created needless violence and was detrimental to the cause of increased Korean autonomy, which he felt could be attained under the existing Japanese legal system.

In November 1919, Min resigned as Governor of Goyang County, and he was immediately reappointed to the Central Advisory Institute of the Governor-General of Korea.

In July and November 1920, and again from January to February 1921, Min went to Japan to speak with lawmakers in the Diet of Japan, both in the House of Representatives of Japan and the House of Peers, to promote the cause of Korean autonomy. He stayed in Tokyo, and also met with other Japanese intellectuals. However, Min's efforts to promote autonomy and better rights for Koreans under Japanese rule were strongly opposed by the Korean independence movement.

=== Death ===
On February 16, 1921, while Min was staying at the Imperial Hotel in Tokyo, he was stabbed with a dagger by Korean independence activist Yang Keun-hwan, who was disguised as a carpenter. Min was taken to the Tokyo Imperial University hospital, but died the following day.

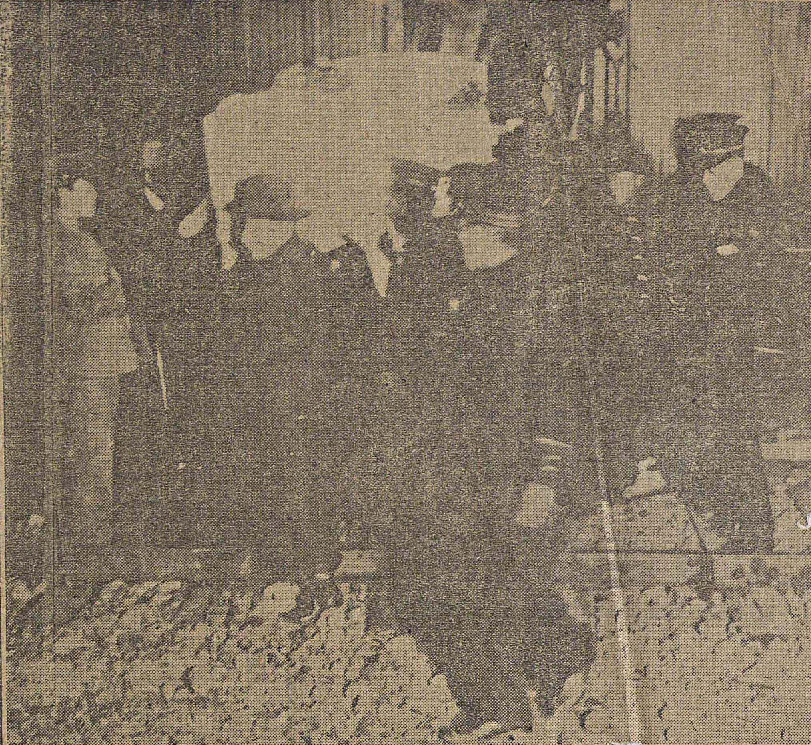
His body is moved, in Namdaemun.

Min's coffin was moved by boat and train for the funeral service. After an hour-long service, his body was taken to Namdaemun. His entire funeral lasted for three days and was hosted by Eom Ju-myeong (his brother in-law) and Eon Jun-won (his father in-law). His body was buried in neighboring hill of Hongreung.

After a few years, his grave was then moved to the temple compound of Gaeunsa, in the Anam-dong neighborhood of Seoul.

== Family ==
- Father
  - Min Yŏngjun (민영준; 閔泳駿; ?–1910s)
    - Adoptive father: Min Yŏngok (민영억; 閔泳億; ? – May 21, 1918)
- Brother
  - Older brother: Min Yunsik (민윤식; 閔允植)
  - Adoptive brother: Min Tosŏk (민도식; 閔道植)
- Wives
  - Unnamed wife
  - Ŏm Ch'aedŏk of the Yeongwol Eom clan (1889–?)
    - Father-in-law: Ŏm Chunwŏn (엄준원; 嚴俊源; 1855 – February 13, 1938)
    - Mother-in-law: Lady Chang of the Indong Jang clan
    - Sister-in-law: Lady Ŏm of the Yeongwol Eom clan (영월 엄씨)
    - Brother-in-law: Ŏm Chumyŏng (엄주명; 嚴柱明; November 19, 1896 – February 6, 1976)
- Daughter
  - Min Ch'unja (민춘자; 閔春子; 1903–?); from his first marriage
- Son
  - Adoptive son: Min Pyŏngsŏng (민병성; 閔丙星)

== Work ==
=== Literature ===
- Matter of governing in Korea (조선 통치문제; 朝鮮統治問題), 1920

=== Works of art ===
- Mungnando (묵란도; 墨蘭圖)
- Mungmaedo (묵매도; 墨梅圖)
- Mukchukto (묵죽도; 墨竹圖), 1914
- Kukhwa (국화; 菊花)
