= Yangchung High School =

Private school in Seoul, South Korea

Information
- Type: Private
- Motto: Through training the mind become more physically fit, through enlightenment we save and liberate our people
- Established: 1905

Korean name
- Hangul: 양정고등학교
- Hanja: 養正高等學校
- RR: Yangjeong godeunghakgyo
- MR: Yangjŏng kodŭnghakkyo

Yangchung High School (Korean: 양정고등학교) is one of the oldest private secondary schools of South Korea. Throughout its history, the school has moved three times and is currently situated in Mok-dong, Yangcheon District, Seoul.

== History ==
Yangchung High School originates from an educational institution called yangchunguisuk in 1905, sponsored by Queen Eom, in Jongno. The school was temporarily disbanded at the start of the Japanese occupation of Korea, but was reopened after 9 years. During this period the school produced many fighters against the Japanese, as well as national heroes, including the marathon runner Sohn Kee-Chung.

After the Japanese withdrew from the Korean Peninsula and with the onset of the Cold War, the school continued to operate until the outbreak of the Korean Civil War, at the start of which Seoul - where the school was and still is situated - was overrun by communist forces. The school set up temporary facilities in the South of the country, but relocated to Seoul once the war ended.

In 1988, the school moved to Mok-dong. from the original building that was located in Man-li dong.

== Sport ==
As the history of the school is very old, it started many traditions in high school.

=== Rugby ===
Yangchung school is known for its annual rugby match with Pai chai high school (an institution that started from the Pai chai Hakdang founded by American missionary Henry Appenzeller in 1885, which also started Pai Chai University) that has been going on since 1946, nicknamed the "Baeyangjeon" or "Yangbae Jeon".

=== Hiking ===
Yangchung has the oldest school hiking organizations in Korea. Although private mountaineering clubs existed such as the 1926 group "Muresane", the official mountaineering club for the school was founded in 1937.In 2005 the members of the club went on an expedition to Mount Everest commemorating the 100th anniversary of the school.

== Notable alumni ==
The school has over 50,000 former students and graduates.

- Jo O-ryeon
- Sohn Kee-chung
