= Sookmyung Gayageum Orchestra =

- Korean name
- Hangul: 숙명여대 가야금 연주단
- Hanja: 淑明女大伽倻琴演奏團
- Revised Romanization: Sungmyeong Yeodae Gayageum Yeonjudan
- McCune–Reischauer: Sungmyŏng Yŏdae Kayagŭm Yŏnjudan

The Sookmyung Gayageum Orchestra (Korean: 숙명여대 가야금 연주단) is a musical ensemble from South Korea. It was formed in 1999 by music students at Sookmyung Women's University. The ensemble comprises up to 24 gayageum, often accompanied by Korean and Western percussion instruments. The group is often led by a conductor, and its performances sometimes features soloists on instruments such as the haegeum, as well as a cappella groups and breakdance groups such as Last For One.

The group performs music ranging from interpretations of ancient cheongak repertoire, to contemporary compositions by Korean composers, arrangements of Russian, South American, and Japanese folk songs, and arrangements of Beatles songs and Western classical works such as the Pachelbel Canon.

The Sookmyung Gayageum Orchestra has released 12 CDs.

== Discography ==
- 2000 - Sookmyung Gayageum Orchestra
- 2001 - Gayasong
- 2003 - Let it be
- 2005 - Oriental Move Of Gayageum
- 2006 - Lovely Gayageum
- 2006 - For You (Best Collection)
- 2007 - Singing & Dancing (Single)
- 2007 - Nobody know Tears (Single)
- 2011 - Water Garden
- 2012 - Sweet yawning
- 2012 - Lovely Christmas (EP)
- 2017 - Nostalgia
