= Gaeunsa =

Buddhist temple in Seoul, South Korea

Coordinates: 37.5900°N 127.0283°E

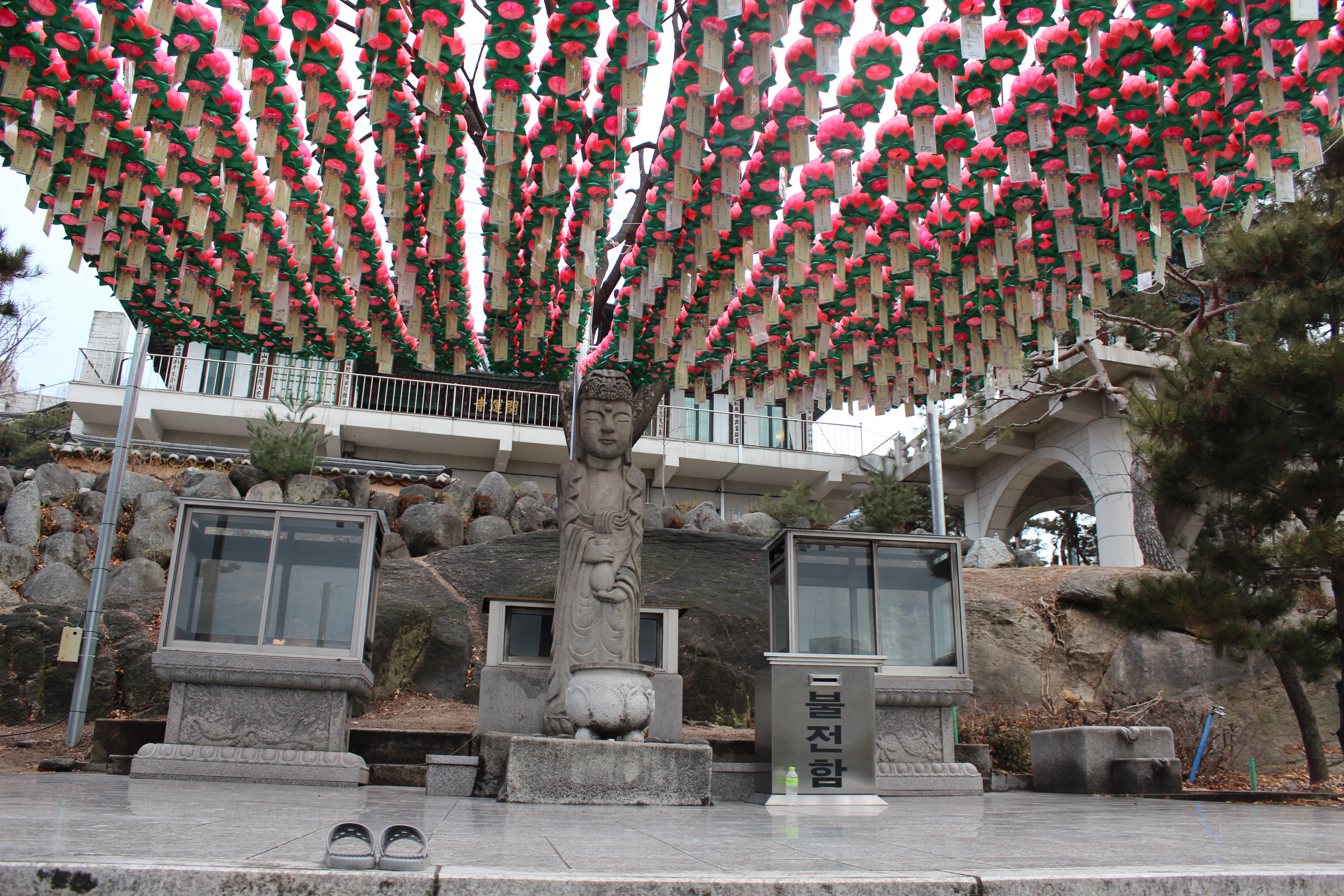

Korean name
- Hangul: 개운사
- Hanja: 開運寺
- RR: Gaeunsa
- MR: Kaeunsa

Site of Gaeunsa

Gaeunsa (Korean: 개운사) is a Buddhist temple of the Jogye Order in Seoul, South Korea. Founded in 1396 by the Buddhist monk Muhak, it is located at 15 Anam 5-dong in the Seongbuk District area of the city.

== Gallery ==
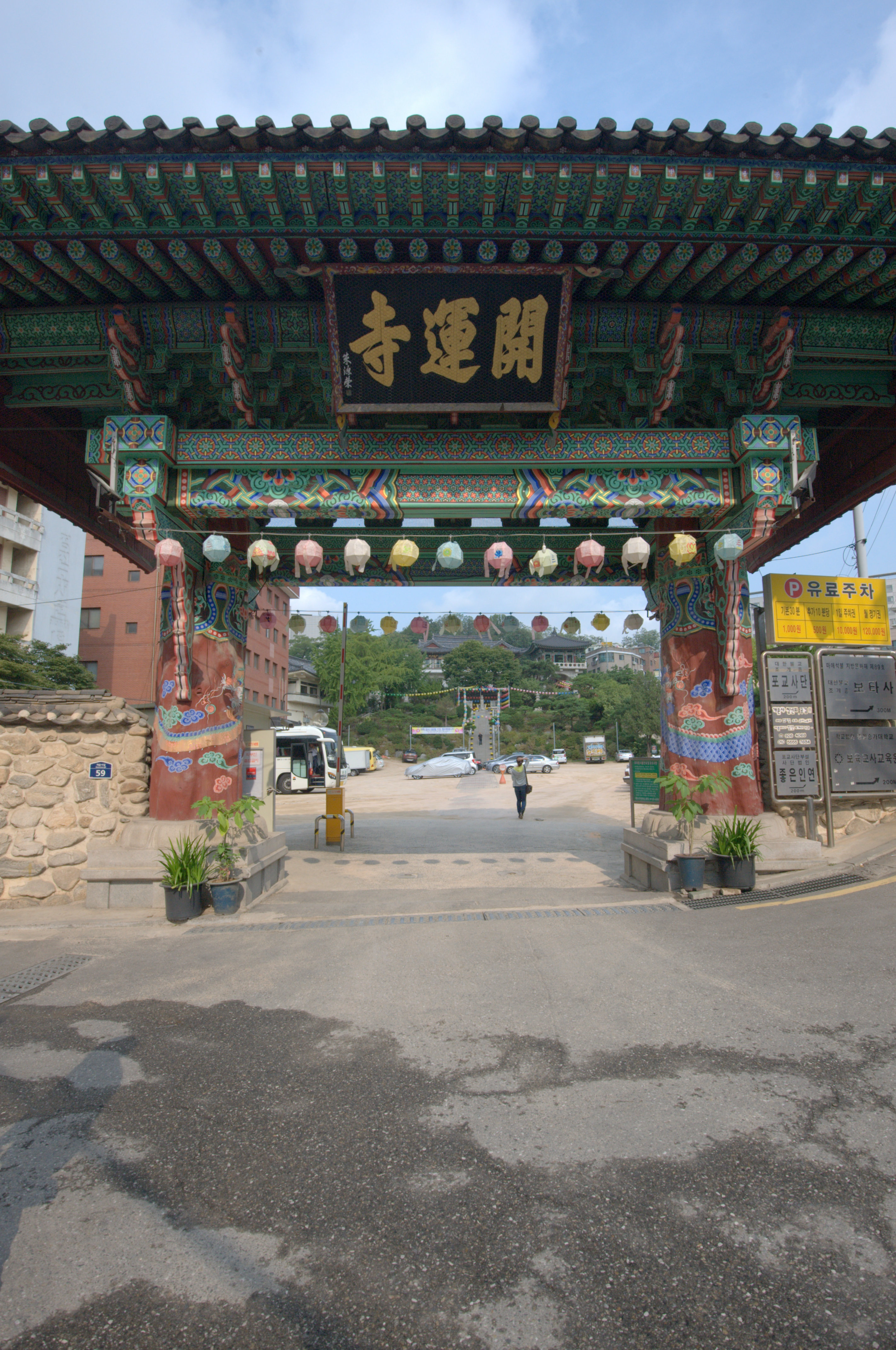
Front gate

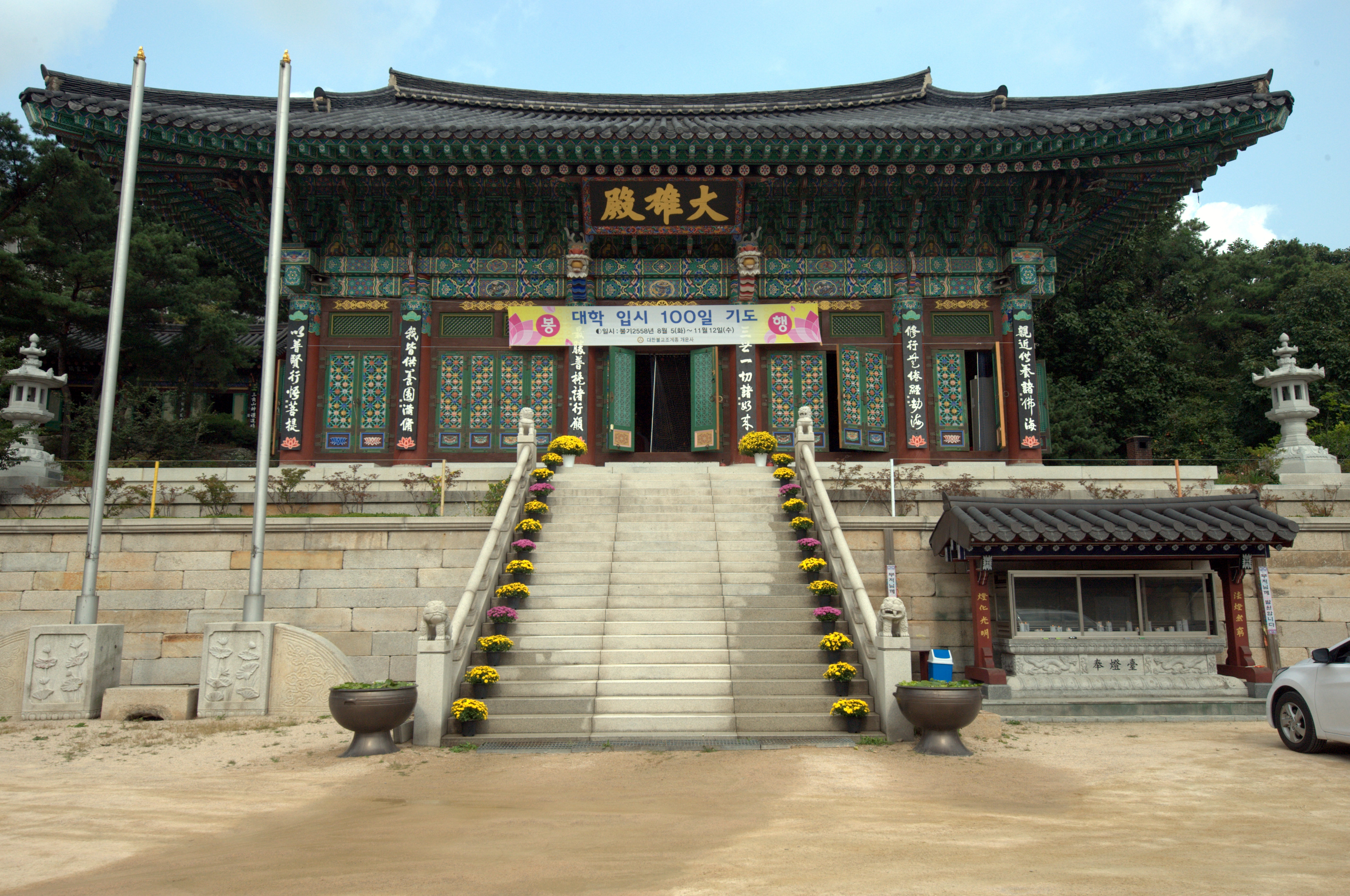

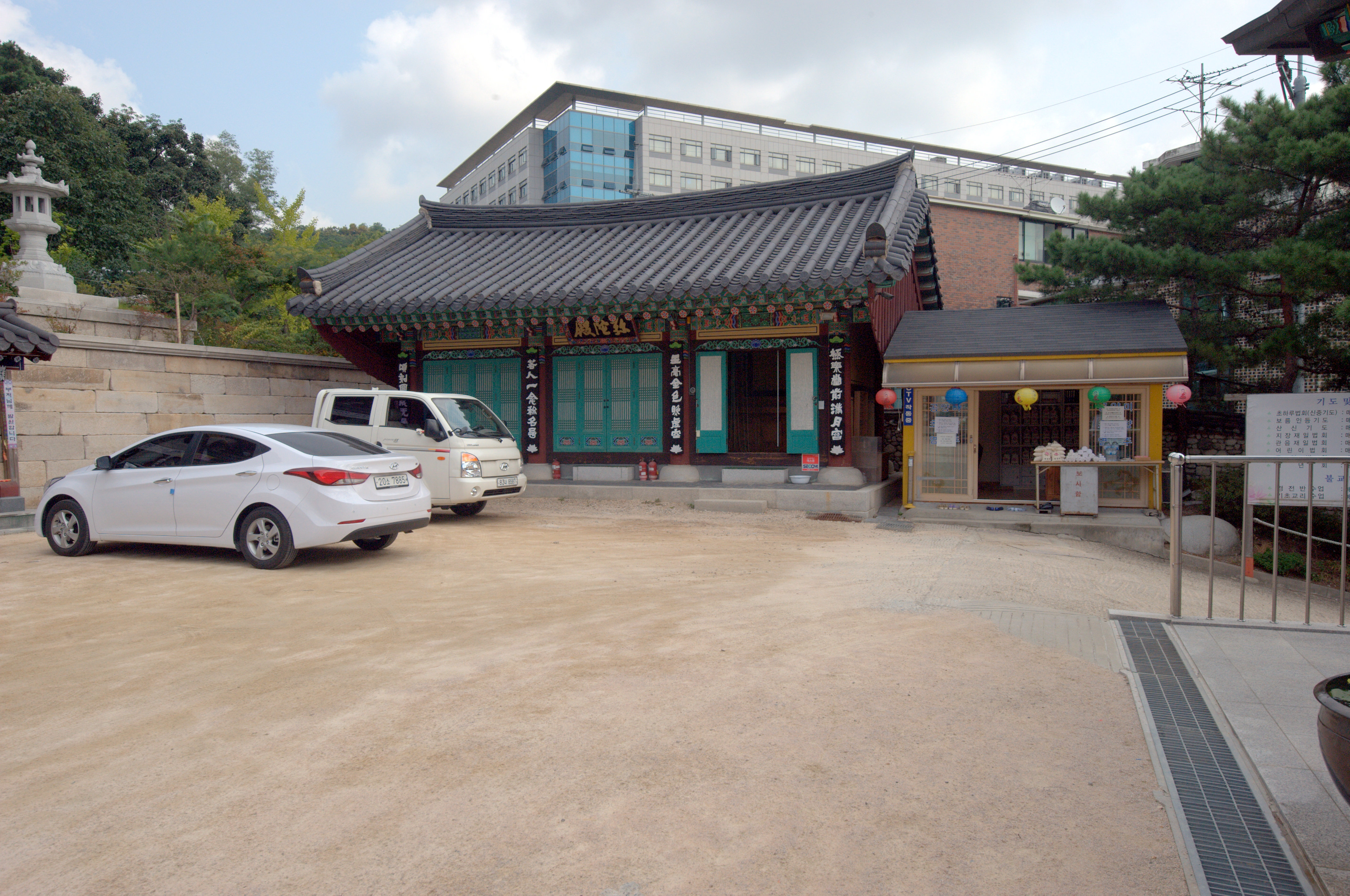

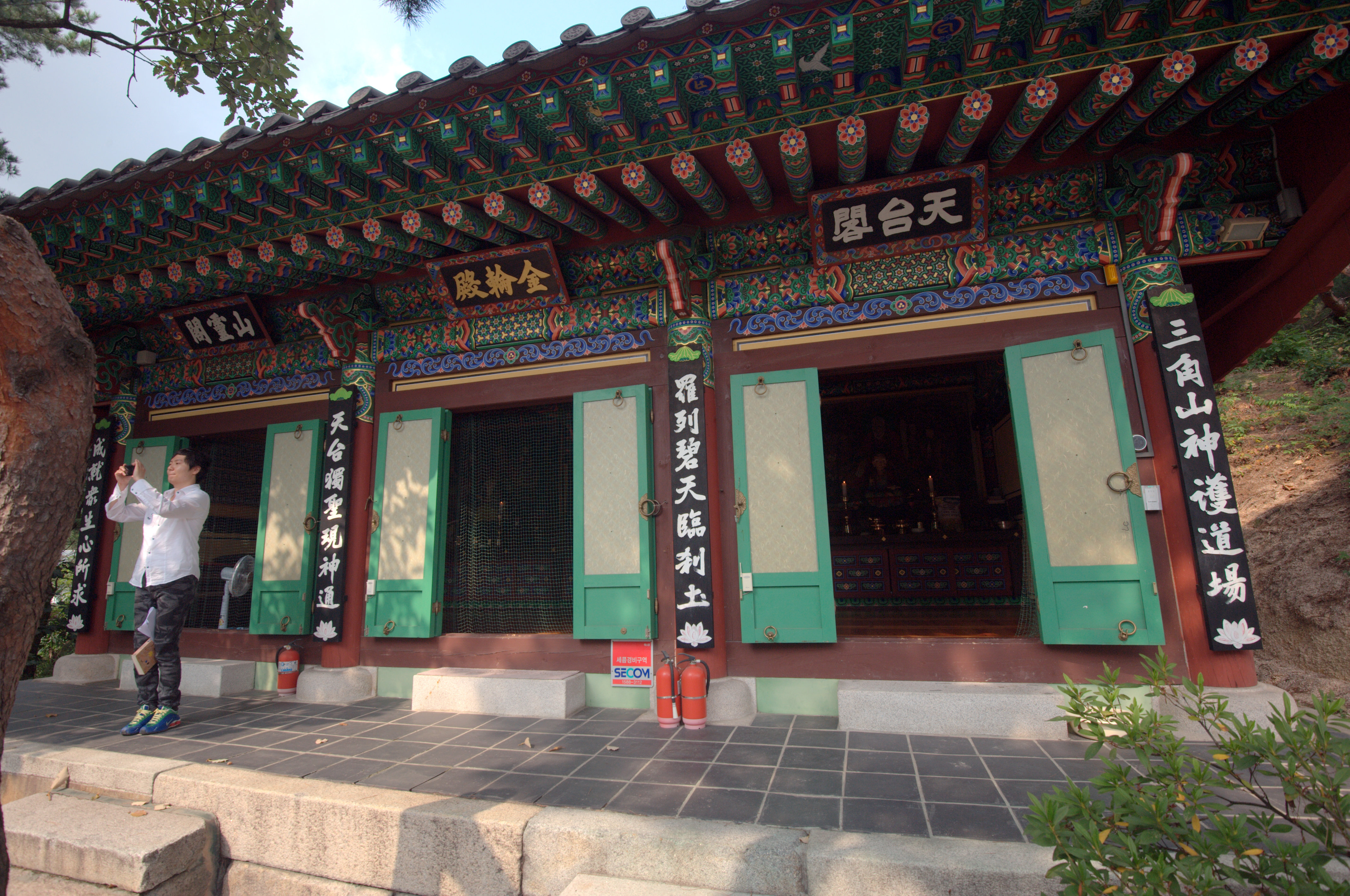

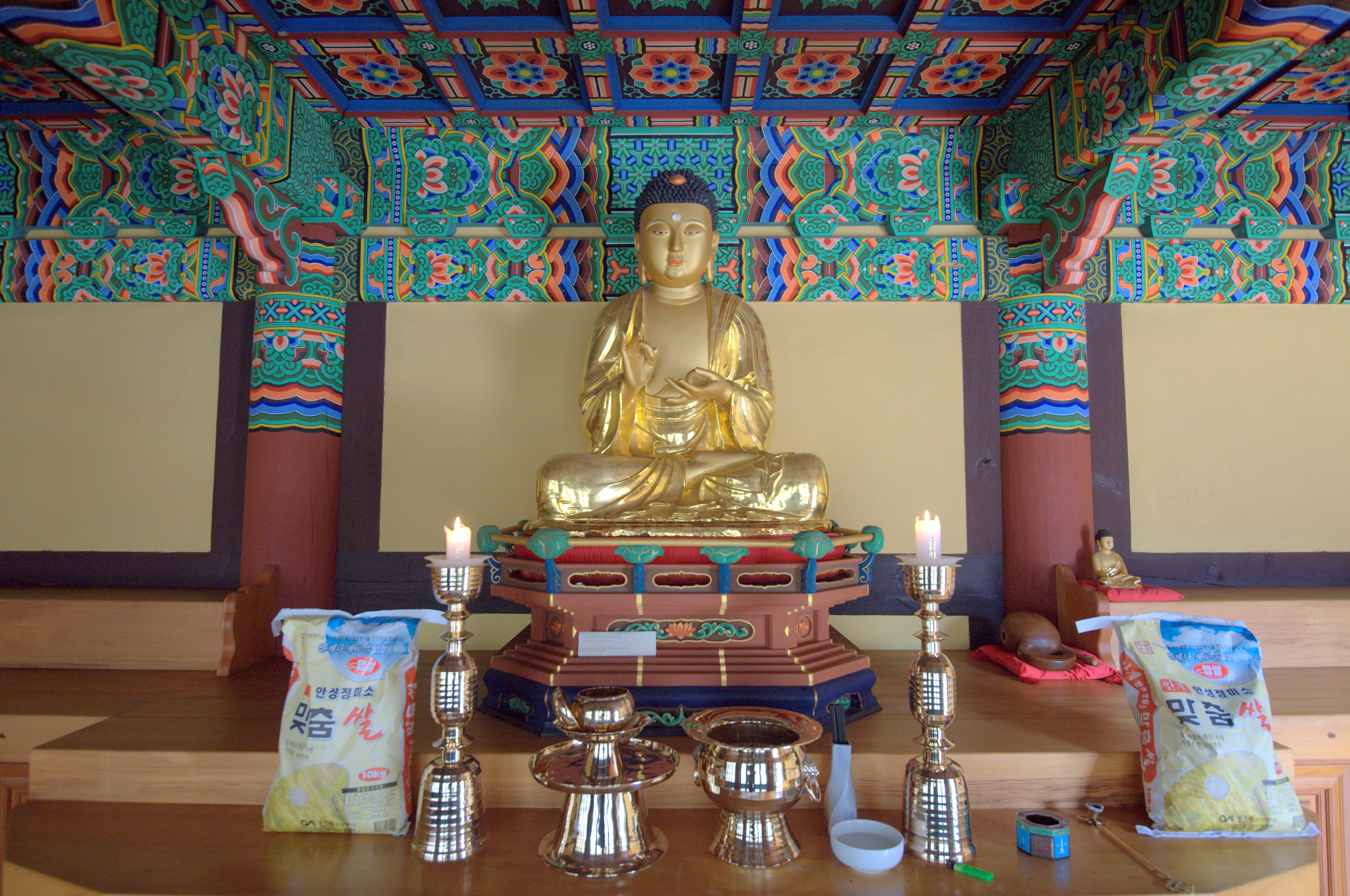

== See also ==
- List of Buddhist temples in Seoul
