= Sookmyung Women's University =

Private university in Seoul, South Korea

Coordinates: 37.545419°N 126.964649°E

- 숙명여자대학교
- Motto: Modesty, Wisdom, and Justice 정숙•현명•정대 (貞淑•賢明•正大)
- Type: Private
- Established: May 22, 1906; 120 years ago as Myeongshin Girls' School, renamed to Sookmyung Women's College on December 1, 1909, re-established as a university on May 22, 1948; 78 years ago
- Founders: Emperor Gojong and Imperial Consort Sunheon of the Korean Empire
- President: Moon Si Yeun (문시연)
- Faculty: 460 (2018)
- Students: 10,492 (2018)
- Undergraduates: 2,209 (2018)
- Location: Yongsan, Seoul, South Korea
- Campus: Urban
- Mascot: Nunsong-i (Snowflake)
- Website: www.sookmyung.ac.kr

Korean name
- Hangul: 숙명여자대학교
- Hanja: 淑明女子大學校
- RR: Sungmyeong yeoja daehakgyo
- MR: Sungmyŏng yŏja taehakkyo

Sookmyung Women's University (Korean: 숙명여자대학교) is a private women's research university in Yongsan-gu, Seoul, South Korea. Founded by the royal family in 1906, Sookmyung is Korea's first royal private educational institution for women. Sookmyung is one of the world's largest female educational institutes. The university's name is derived from Hanja characters of sook and Myung, which mean "elegant" and "bright" respectively.

== Timeline ==
- 1906 ''Myungshin Girls' School'' established by Emperor Gojong of the Korean Empire. The imperial charter was chaired by Imperial Consort Sunheon. and vice-chaired by Queen Consort Ui.
- 1948 Re-established as "Sookmyung Women's College".
- 1955 Raised to "University" status.
- 1995 Establishment of the General Development Plan for 2006, the 100th anniversary of the school's foundation, and the second founding of the school.
- 2000 The first Korean university to receive ISO 14001.
- 2003 Completion of the Renaissance Plaza and the Second Foundation Campus.
- 2004 Chung Young Yang Embroidery Museum inaugurated.
- 2004~2005 Chosen by the Ministry of Education & Human Resources Development in the University Specialization Supporting Program in 2004 and 2005.
- 2005 Sookmyung Women's Disease Research Center was designated as a new Superior Research Center (SRC) by the Ministry of Science Technology.
- 2006 Established "Le Cordon Bleu Hospitality MBA".
  The 100th anniversary of Sookmyung's foundation.
- 2007 "S Leadership Program" is born.

== Campus ==
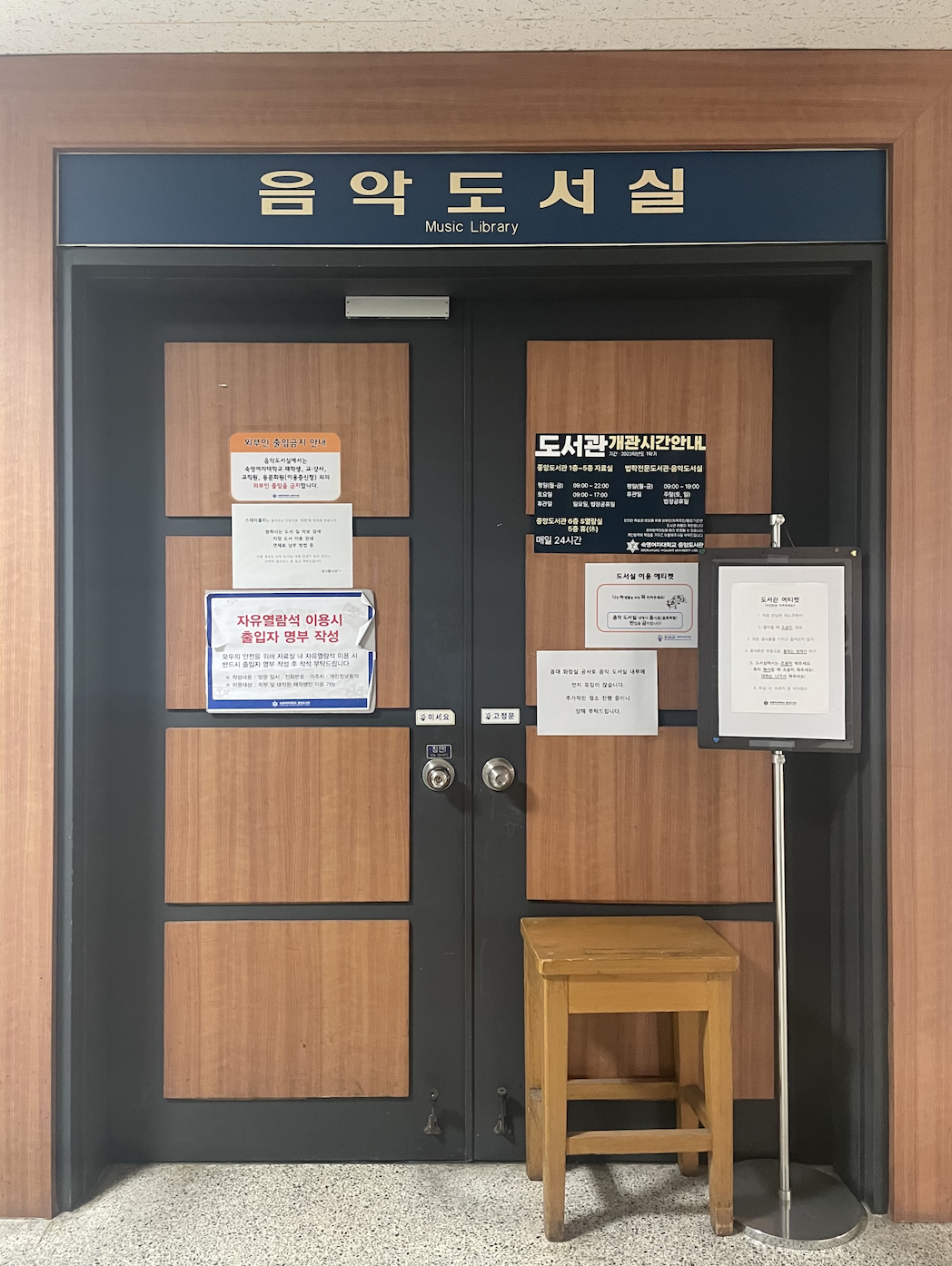
Music Library at SMU

Sookmyung Women's University consists of a Main Campus and a Second Foundation Campus. The Second Foundation Campus, constructed upon the second founding and declaration of the university, is the cultural center of the university and home to the "S Leadership Program". The Renaissance Plaza, which has become a landmark, symbol and hub of Sookmyung Women's University, features cultural attractions and activities.

University rankings

Regional – Overall
- QS Asia: =273 (2025)

== Academic programs ==
=== General Education for Leadership ===
First-year students automatically become a part of the Division of General Education for Leadership.

Sookmyung Women's university has a global cooperation department. In the department, there are global cooperation and entrepreneurship majors. Officially, all classes in the department are taught in English. However, depending on the English skills of professors, exceptions apply.

Currently, Sookmyung Women's University coordinates with the government's Small and Medium Business Administration (SBA) to provide high-quality business education. According to a government report, only six top schools were selected to cooperate with the SBA — Seoul National University, Pohang University of Science and Technology, Korea Advanced Institute of Science and Technology, Hanyang University, and Inha University.

=== Dual degree program ===
Sookmyung Women's University is the first Korean university to offer a dual degree program that allows students to earn degrees from two institutions. Students are exposed to more comprehensive and integrative approaches to their majors by studying four semesters at each school.

== Academic rank ==
According to JoongAng Daily's 2018 university rankings, Sookmyung Women's University is the second best women's university in Korea and is ranked nr. 20 on South Korea's list of best universities.

Admission is selective. General CSAT scores for admission is two level 1 and one level 2 in language, mathematics; foreign language criteria and two level 1 in rest.

== Chung Young Yang Embroidery Museum ==
The Chung Young Yang Embroidery Museum at Sookmyung Women's University is an exhibition, educational, and research facility dedicated to advancing the knowledge and appreciation of embroidery and textile arts. Inaugurated in May 2004, the museum houses an extensive collection of embroidered and woven textiles representing various periods and regions.

The museum's permanent collection, primarily focused on East Asian costume and decorative arts, is among the most comprehensive of its kind in Asia. Housed in a new building that includes exhibition galleries, an information center, a library, conservation studios, classrooms and a 300 seat auditorium equipped with earphones for simultaneous translation, the museum aims to become a leading center for scholarship in embroidery and other textile arts.

=== Collection ===
The permanent collection of the Chung Young Yang Embroidery Museum includes votive textiles, ecclesiastical robes, military uniforms, folding screens, wedding garments, chair and table coverings, rank insignia, and various types of clothing, costume accessories, and household furnishings used by all social classes. The collection encompasses a broad range of examples from around the world as well as replicas of extant ancient artifacts.

== Controversy ==
In 2012, Sookmyung University's board was involved in a scandal involving alleged money laundering. Specifically, according to the school's internal laws, the university's board is obliged to make financial contributions to the operational budget of the school through a foundation. However, when the school received a total of 68.5 billion won ($61 million) in donations from 1995 to 2009, the university's board placed these donations in a foundation account and then transferred them to a school administration account, making it appear as if it was the foundation which made a financial contribution to the school's management. Excluding these "donations", the foundation made no contribution of its own to school administration. As a consequence, from 1995 to 20, 9 Sookmyung University students paid 5% more tuition fee than they otherwise would have had to do.

In 2020, Sookmyung Women's University became the first Korean women's university to admit a trans student; however, the student later withdrew her acceptance after news of her acceptance sparked controversy.

== Notable people ==
- Han Seong-sook, the 50th Prime Minister of the Republic of Korea
- Moon Hee-kyung, actress
- Kim Hye-kyung, pianist, and the First Lady of the Republic of Korea. (President Lee, Jae-myung)
- Kim Kun-hee, business executive and the First Lady of the Republic of Korea (President Yoon, Seok-ryeol)
- Bae Hyun-jin, member of the National Assembly for the People Power Party

== See also ==
- Sookmyung Gayageum Orchestra
- Sookmyung Girls' High School
- Asian Women, academic journal of the Research Institute of Asian Women (RIAW) based at Sookmyung Women's University
