= Yeongwol Eom clan =

Korean clan from Gangwon Province

- Country: Korea
- Current region: Yeongwol County
- Founder: Eom Im-ui
- Connected members: Uhm Hyun-kyung; Yoo Ah-in; Uhm Ji-won; Um Hyo-sup; Uhm Tae-woong; Uhm Jung-hwa; Um Hong-gil; Ohm Ki-young; Um Aing-ran; Uhm Bok-dong; Jamie Chung
- Website: http://www.eomssi.or.kr/

Yeongwol Eom clan (Korean: 영월 엄씨; Hanja: 寧越 嚴氏) is a Korean clan. Their Bon-gwan is in Yeongwol County, Gangwon Province. Their founder was Eom Im-ui. Eom Im-ui (엄림의; 嚴林義) was a descendant of Yan Guang, ultimately descended of Zhuang, the 6th King of Chu. He was dispatched to Silla as an envoy with Sin Gyeong, the founder of the Yeongsan Shin clan, who was sent to Korea by Emperor Xuanzong of Tang, during the reign of Gyeongdeok of Silla.

== See also ==
- Um (Korean surname)
- Korean clan names of foreign origin
