= Imperial Noble Consort =

Title used in East Asian empires (皇貴妃)

Imperial Noble Consort (Chinese: 皇貴妃, Vietnamese: hoàng quý phi, Korean: 황귀비) was the title of women who ranked second to the Empress in the imperial harem of China during most of the period spanning from 1457 to 1915.

In Ming Dynasty, the rank of Imperial Noble Consort was only a highest honorary title of an imperial consort.

On the contrast, in Qing Dynasty, the rank of Imperial Noble Consort was considered to be Vice-Empress, making the rank closer to the Empress, therefore, the Emperor was very careful in promoting one of his imperial consorts in this rank while the Empress was alive. If the Empress agrees to the promotion of an imperial consort to Imperial Noble Consort, it should be in the following causes:

1. When an imperial consort, (usually a noble consort), was gravely ill, the Emperor promotes her to Imperial Noble Consort to pray for her and to comfort her.
2. The Imperial Noble Consort will help the Empress as assistant in managing the inner court.
3. If the Empress was incapable of ruling the Imperial Harem or she died, the Imperial Noble Consort will take over her duty as chief of the Imperial Harem.

== History ==
=== Qing dynasty ===
In the Qing dynasty, a Manchu-led dynasty, the title of Imperial Noble Consort was the highest-ranking position that women of Han descent could achieve.

According to the Illustrated Regulations for Ceremonial Paraphernalia of the Present Dynasty (1766), Imperial Noble Consorts were one of the few positions of women allowed to wear attire featuring insignia of the Chinese dragon; the other positions being those of Empress Dowager, Empress, and Princesses. Women lower than Imperial Noble Consort were forbidden from wearing any clothing featuring dragon patterns.

== List of titleholders ==
=== Ming ===
1. Jingtai Emperor: Imperial Noble Consort Tang
2. Chenghua Emperor: Imperial Noble Consort Wan
3. Jiajing Emperor: Imperial Noble Consort Rong'an, Imperial Noble Consort Duanhe, Imperial Noble Consort Zhuangshun
4. Longqing Emperor: Imperial Noble Consort Li
5. Wanli Emperor: Imperial Noble Consort Li, Imperial Noble Consort Gong
6. Taichang Emperor: Imperial Noble Consort Kang
7. Tianqi Emperor: Imperial Noble Consort Kang, Imperial Noble Consort Hui
8. Chongzhen Emperor: Imperial Noble Consort Gongshu

=== Qing ===
– Women who were elevated to the status of Impreial Noble Consort after death

Portrait	Name	Tenure	Life details	Emperor	Ref.
	Donggo	19 January 1657 – 23 September 1660 (3 years, 8 months and 4 days)	c.1639 – 23 September 1660 (aged 20–21)	Shunzhi	
	Xiaoyiren	28 January 1682 – 23 August 1689 (7 years, 6 months and 26 days)	died 24 August 1689	Kangxi	
	Quehui	Posthumously named Imperial Noble Consort in June/July 1743	1668 – 24 April 1743 (aged 74–75)	Kangxi	
—	Jingmin	Posthumously named Imperial Noble Consort on 30 June 1723	died 20 August 1699	Kangxi	
	Dunyi	Posthumously named Imperial Noble Consort in June 1768	3 December 1683 – 30 April 1768 (aged 84)	Kangxi	
—	Dunsu	19 December 1725 – 23 December 1725 (4 days)		Yongzheng	
	Chunque	28 January 1785		Yongzheng	

Portrait	Name	Tenure	Life details	Emperor	Ref.
	Duankang	12 March 1913 – 24 September 1924 (11 years, 6 months and 12 days)	6 October 1873 – 24 September 1924 (aged 50)	Guangxu	
	Keshun	Posthumously named Imperial Noble Consort on 24 April 1921	27 February 1876 – 15 August 1900 (aged 24)	Guangxu	

1. Qianlong Emperor: Step-Empress Nara, Empress Xiaoyichun, Imperial Noble Consort Huixian, Imperial Noble Consort Chunhui, Imperial Noble Consort Shujia, Imperial Noble Consort Qinggong, Imperial Noble Consort Zhemin
2. Jiaqing Emperor: Empress Xiaoherui, Imperial Noble Consort Heyu, Imperial Noble Consort Gongshun
3. Daoguang Emperor: Empress Xiaoquancheng, Empress Xiaojingcheng, Imperial Noble Consort Zhuangshun
4. Xianfeng Emperor: Empress Xiaoqinxian, Imperial Noble Consort Zhuangjing, Imperial Noble Consort Duanke
5. Tongzhi Emperor: Imperial Noble Consort Shushen, Imperial Noble Consort Gongsu, Imperial Noble Consort Xianzhe, Imperial Noble Consort Dunhui
