= Korean embroidery =

Embroidery style of Korea

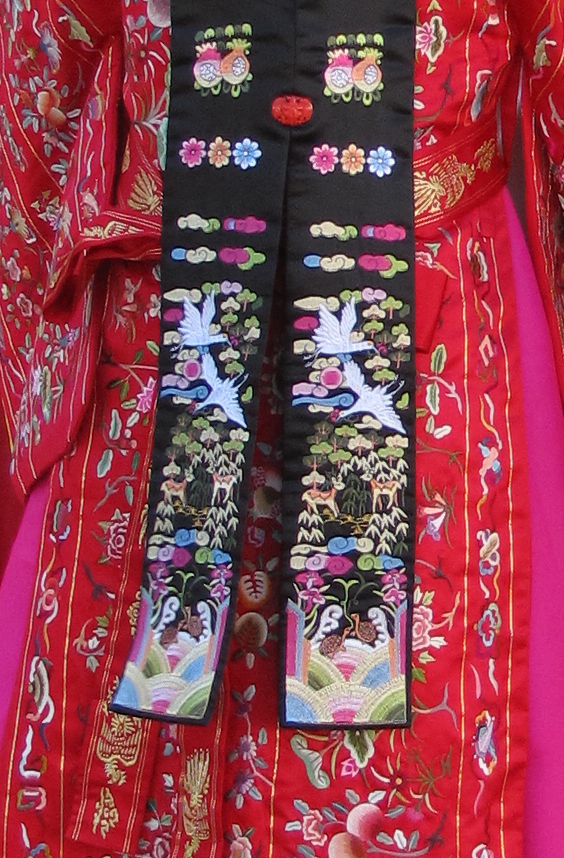
Detail of colourful Korean embroidery.

Korean embroidery techniques and artifacts have a long history, but there is the most evidence from the Joseon Dynasty, after the 14th century in Korea. This article talks about the history, styles, preservation, artists, and examples of screens, costumes, and domestic wares of this exacting and beautiful art form.

People used needles made out of bones of fish or animals to sew and weave animal skins and the bark or leaves of trees.

Chasu, the Korean word for embroidery, was a method of cultivating beauty in every corner of daily life. Pokshik chasu, kiyong chasu, kamsang chasu and Buddhist chasu are the four types of Chasu.

- Pokshik chasu is the embroidery on clothes.
- Kiyong chasu is the embroidery decorated on various materials used in the king’s palace.
- Kamsang chasu represented a type of artistic piece.
- Buddhist chasu came from Buddhism. Buddhist chasu was used in the statues of Buddha or various temples. Chasu has begun from the prehistoric era when the humans first started to make clothes.

== History ==
Traditional embroidery of Korea has a long history and has reflected Korea aesthetic values as they changed over time. Alongside weaving and sewing, embroidery formed part of everyday life and developed as a skilled decorative craft. It also reflected aspects of Korean cultural identity and artistic traditions.

Traditional embroidery of Korea used silk cloth and thread mainly before the Three Kingdoms of Korea and had a special gloss and texture. As a result, the aesthetic effect of embroidery was expressed as beautifully as possible. This silk embroidery was first introduced in Persia, became popular in Iran, and was known to have been brought to Korea through India and China.

=== Prehistory ===
In the Bronze Age, there are ferrules made of soil or stone, large and small crocodiles, stone needles, and needle houses. It can be inferred that weaving and sewing were already done at the time when such spinning tools and sewing tools were unearthed.

Following the Bronze Age, iron farming came into being in the Iron Age, and agriculture was remarkably developed. Textile cultivation technology developed and textile production increased. In the case of "Three Kingdoms" and "Huh Hanbook", it is said that this time, it was cultivated horse and mulberry trees and raised that silkworm cocoons, including cotton seeds, mapo, and coops.

The development of these fabrics is a basic requirement for embroidery development. In the granting of the transfer of the "Three Kingdoms", "the grantor wears clothes made of silver, gold, silver, and silver when he goes abroad", and the number is recorded as silver silk embroidered with gold and silver.

The embroidery is presumed to have been embroidered on clothes, flags and wagons with signs indicating the rank and class of the ruling class at that time, although the facts of this age are not conveyed to today because of the nature of the materials which are easily damaged. Literary records of the embroidery before the Three Kingdoms period are only fragmentary about the embroidery and the fabric used in the Goryeo, Goguryeo, Mahan, Jinhwan, Changjin, and Yeon before the Three Kingdoms period.

=== Samgukside (Three Kingdoms Period) ===
In this age, production tools and production technology have been developed in general and productivity has improved. As a result, weaving machines have been improved and weaving has been developed. And the kinds of fabrics have increased and quality also has improved. Therefore, embroidery decorations would have been performed on clothes and various textile products. However, the literature on embroidery is scarce and there are no examples of embroidery artifacts left yet. Among the unearthed artifacts of Gyeongju Cheonmachuk excavated in 1973, traces of gold silk were found on the hem.

In the Samguk sagi and Samgukyusa, the Silla Dynasty Queen (Jinduk Queen 4) sent "Taipyeong Song" to Tang dynasty. The "Taepyeongsong" embroidery, which was produced as a diplomatic gift at that time, is a masterpiece in which 100 Chinese characters combined with 5 and 20 lines are embroidered. The content was a ritual that praised Gojong's dignity.

The number of "Taepyongsong" suggests that firstly, embroidery has made a great contribution as a diplomatic gift to represent the friendship between nations. Secondly, the record that the queen squeezed her handmade silk was important for embroidery, including sewing, weaving and dyeing, as a household art that women should acquire from their childhood, from noble to commoner.

The embroidery was brought to Japan with various cultures developed in this period and had a great influence. Such facts can be found in the records of the Japanese Nihon Shiki and the Japanese embroidery textbook chronicle. Around 340 BC, the king of Baekje sent Jin Maojin, the workwoman, to Japan and she became the founder of Japanese embroidery.

In addition, the head of the maritime state Mandara (Japanese National Treasure), which was built by Kagyu Iga, is depicted as a Goguryeo-style figure. It is believed that the embroidery techniques of Koguryo and Baekje were handed down to Japan because there are many similarities. The embroidery of Goguryeo, Silla, and Baekje are commonly seen as representing the identity of the nobility, and they have been supplemented with abstract paintings on restoration, longevity.

=== Unified Silla Period ===
In this era, cultural characteristics of the Three Kingdoms were fused and gathered and enjoyed the glorious golden age of culture. Embroidery was also considered to have developed considerably both quantitatively and qualitatively. However, there are no existing artifacts at the time, and no detailed data on embroidery techniques and patterns can be found, so research through works is impossible. However, when you look at the "Samguksagi", you can see that the embroidery has been decorated with embroidery from cloths to saddle, and daily necessities, and Buddhist embroidery has also prospered considerably. The records of the embroidery are summarized first, and in 834 (the 9th year of King Heungdeok) the costume ban was issued and stipulated the kind of use of fabric according to the status. This ban was enforced, and it can be seen that the demand for fine fabrics and embroidery was considerable due to the luxury that was prevalent in the noble society at the time. On the other hand, there were many workshops dedicated to weaving, dyeing, and sewing in this period, contributing to the development of textile arts.

=== Goryeo Dynasty ===
In the Goryeo era, the embroidery has evolved more and more. The country established a bureaucratic office and a manual book to produce various cloths and handicrafts. It seems that not only the items shown in the literature have been diversified compared to the previous era, but also the production technology has developed considerably. According to the "Goryo Dogyung", the guards who escorted the king usually wore silk bouquets embroidered with five-color flowers or birds, and decorated with white flowers in their waistbands. As the embroidery is decorated up to military uniforms, it seems that the embroidery decoration was also performed in the costumes of the noble and common people.

=== Joseon Dynasty ===
The most prominent feature of embroidery development in the Joseon Dynasty is that the use of handicrafts has expanded to the general level, The embroideries used in the court are made by skilled ladies who are experts in embroidery belonging to the court, and the embroidery expressions are precise and the arrangement of the colors is sophisticated, but it is somewhat formalized because it is made by standardized handwriting. On the other hand, the embroideries made in the villages are not very sophisticated because of their low proficiency, but they are varied and interesting because they embroidered to their taste.

The most popular themes used to decorate men’s quarters in this era were common objects and accoutrements typically used by Confucian scholars; these included books, pens, scrolls, and vases.

=== Modern ===
Craftsman with professional handicraft technique embroidering succeeds embroidery culture. They hold an exhibition in South Korea and abroad.

== Components and Features ==
=== Material ===
The base cloth of embroidery was white or blue silk colored silk, and wool was rarely used. And the investigation was mainly used by the half - puns and the twins. In the mid Joseon Dynasty, the lacquered sagas became thinner and the thick braided saga after the late Joseon Dynasty was the basic material of traditional embroidery. Braided yarn has strength and elasticity and can be easily remained or undamaged. Also, it is suitable for regular fine embroidery, and the twisted yarn is strong, so that the gloss of the yarn is not exposed. There are differences in the effect of expression depending on the number of twisted lines and the direction of the beam (left or right), but in any case, the surface of the braided yarn of constant thickness by a constant light becomes flat without any bending. On the other hand, it is difficult to carry regular or detailed description of the hempen yarn because it is thick and coarse and it can not keep the stool short.

=== Embroidery pattern ===
In the case of the actual pattern, the phrase implies that the pattern has the role of verbal communication as a combination of kanji with the meaning of a word indicating a phenomenon in the cloth. Therefore, the pattern contains a silent language that I want to convey, and the origin of human beings is contained in the silent language. It is embroidery pattern that expresses the pattern with these characteristics in real, and expresses the wish and origination of human history by expressing nature 's landscape, flora and fauna.

== Household Items ==
=== Women's Costume ===
The Hwal-ot:활옷 is the ladies' dresses of the Princess and Ongju of the Joseon Dynasty, Mainly worn by women of the upper classes. It is a common practice to sew 10 things that symbolize long live over the entire garment.

=== Accessories ===
The pouch was packed with a small item or money and packed in a waistband. The main characters used in the text are light, wealthy, long live and luck. plant pattern are chrysanthemums, flowers, morning glory, orchids, peonies, bamboo, vines, cherry blossoms, peaches, peach flowers, Pine trees, lotus flowers, roses, fenugreek. And the animal pattern is a turtle, a butterfly, a barbeque, a bee, a phoenix, a deer, a bird and so on.

Norigae is a trinket for women to wear on a jacket pant or skirt waist. It is embroidered lotus, clouds, stones, waves, suns, and gauze in a square emblem.

Suhye, also known as kkotsin (flower shoes), refers to Korean silk shoes decorated with elaborate embroidery. These were most popular during the Silla Kingdom (57 B.C-A.D. 935) among Korean women throughout the Joseon Dynasty (1392–1910). Women of the upper and common class wore them, especially on their wedding day, because they were associated with special and formal occasions. Suhye were made by layering hemp onto a shoe form covered with blue and red silk fabrics. Once sewn in place, brilliant silk threads were embroidered into elegant designs in shapes of chrysanthemum, bamboo, pine trees, and arabesque motifs. The beautiful flower shoes thus became an essential accessory of stylish women of Korean society. They were even commonly custom-ordered for the most exquisite embroidery. Women wore these to be visible under long skirts, as an expression of charm and stylishness with every step.

Clothing and household items were commonly colorfully embroidered with symbolic motifs throughout East Asia. During the Joseon Dynasty, court officials wore spectacularly embroidered hyungbae (Korean insignia badge) on the chest and back. Different bird and animal motifs were embroidered, indicating the wearer’s position or rank in the court. The double-crane rank badge, for example, indicated first- to third-rank civil officials from the 18th to 20th centuries. Single leopard patterns indicated military officials of fourth- to ninth-rank in the 19th century. Double leopards represented the top three ranks. These were embroidered with tightly twisted silk threads. In Korea, tigers and leopards were commonly used as a symbol of protection from evil.

Other exquisitely embroidered pieces also include the Bojagi (Korean wrapping cloth). A completed bojagi could indicate the socioeconomic status of its maker. Bojagi however, is utilitarian at heart. It is an age-old Korean craft meant to be accessible to everyone. Throughout Korean history, overt emotional expression has been mostly frowned upon, and therefore abundantly expressed instead through artistic characteristics of the Korean culture. Women of the Joseon Dynasty were not to be seen outside of their homes during the day until the evening bells rang and men returned home. Many women, then, found satisfaction through stitching colorful and rich designs on fabric within their homes. Wide ranges of intense to gentle color combinations told the stories of families and history as well as philosophy influenced by yin and yang, Feng Shui, and the five elements said to make up the universe.

== Embroidery Styles and Technique ==
=== Gu style ===
Pioneered by the Gu school in China, this style was quickly adopted by Koreans and neighboring East Asian countries. Also known as a style of embroidery painting, it was famed for its delicate and precise stitchery which sought to achieve the highest degree of realism. This technique evolved from the Song tradition of realistic embroidery that imitated painting. Gu style was used often to illustrate high degrees of naturalism. Authors could achieve stunning detail in the fur of animals and objects in nature by painting onto fabric before stitches were added, then use of thin, hairlike threads (eight filaments twisted into one thread), and blending of two shades by use of long and short stitches. Korean and Japanese embroiders worked with professional painters for their master designs. While much of the painted regions could be covered in stitches, some painted areas could remain visible under minimal embroidery to reveal the painting illustrations as well.

=== Jaryeonsu: 자련수 ===
It is a technique used to express things in a realistic way or to express the natural change of color by using light and shade. It is filled with irregularly long, short, It can make a natural change according to the coloring of the color and the orientation of the gathering and it is suitable for embroidering petal, leaves and clouds of a comparatively large area.

=== Chilbosu: 칠보수 ===
It is a unique technique of Korean embroidery which can not be seen in western embroidery. It is a technique to make regular and geometric patterns by putting the base of the embroidery on it and placing the embroidery on it.

=== Jing-guemsu: 징금수 ===
It is a technique to fix a thick thread or a band with an area that is not stitched on the eye with a thin thread such as a cord, a thick thread, a gold thread, or a silver thread on a cloth.

=== Jarisu: 자리수 ===
It is a unique embroidery technique that is only in Korean traditional embroidery. It is a technique to express the shape of matting mat and it is mainly used when filling a wide side.

=== Stitching Technique Names in Korean ===
Jangsik su—decorative stitch

Jari su—mat stitch

Jaryun su—long and short stitch

Jick su—straight satin stitch

Jinggum su—couching stitch

Karyum su—leaf stitch

Maedup su—seed stitch

Pyung su—covering satin stitch

Sasul su—chain stitch

Socksim su—padding stitch

Yieum su—outline stitch

== See also ==
- Korean art
- Korean culture
- Chinese embroidery
