= Looting of the Eastern Mausoleum =

1928 incident during the Nanjing Decade in Hebei, North China

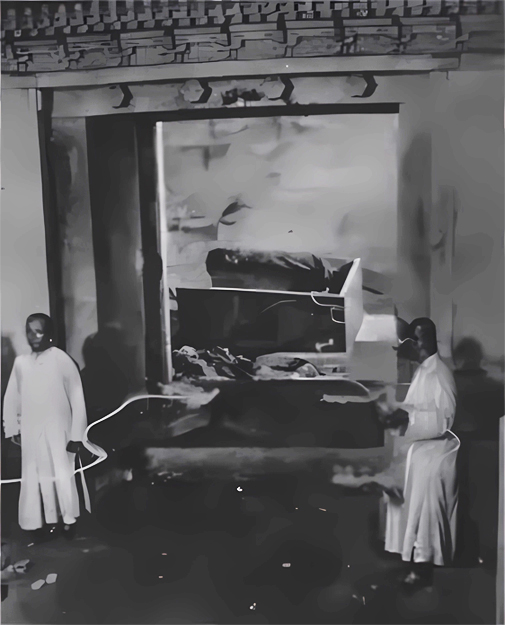
State of the burial chamber of Empress Dowager Cixi's tomb, photographed as part of the post-1928 looting investigations. Cixi's discarded corpse, burial shroud and damaged coffin are visible in the background.

The Looting of the Eastern Mausoleum was a major incident in early June 1928, in which some of the major mausoleums of the Chinese Qing dynasty in the Eastern Qing tombs were ransacked or vandalized by troops under the command of the warlord Sun Dianying.

== Background ==
=== Republican Era ===
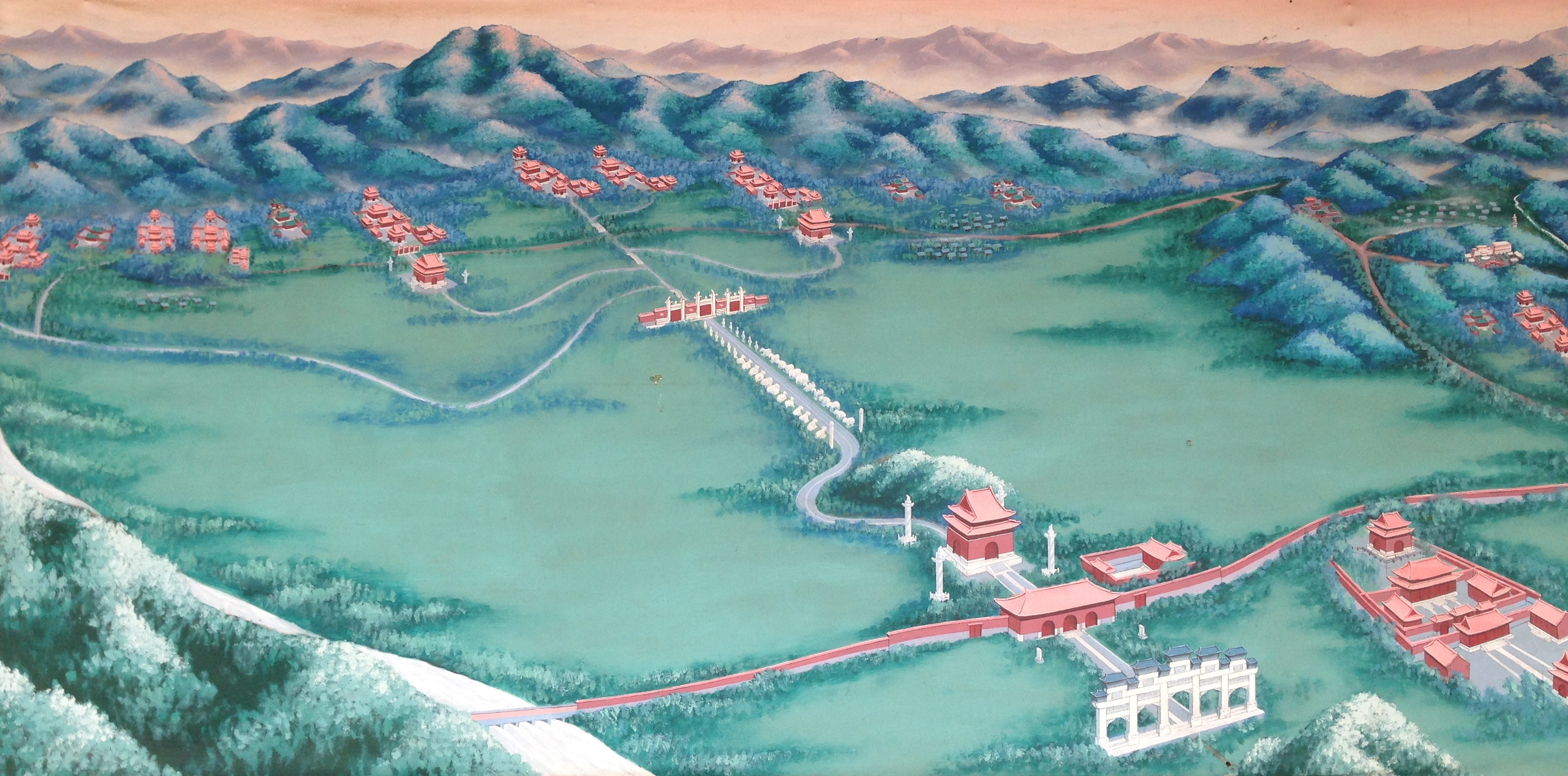
Map of Eastern Qing Tombs, that were the target of looting in 1928.

With the dissolution of the Qing Empire in 1912, the new Republic of China and the recently-abdicated royal family signed a treaty, which included the details and agreements guaranteeing formal federal protections of the Mausoleums of the Qing Dynasty. However, after the occurrence of multiple strenuous events such as Yuan Shikai's attempted restoration of the monarchy in 1915 and the outbreak of the Second Zhili–Fengtian War, made the Nationalist government's capability in upholding these obligations increasingly difficult. With logistics and funding for the protection and maintenance becoming sporadic and unreliable, vigilance over the guarding of the tomb sites dwindled.

=== Sun Dianying ===
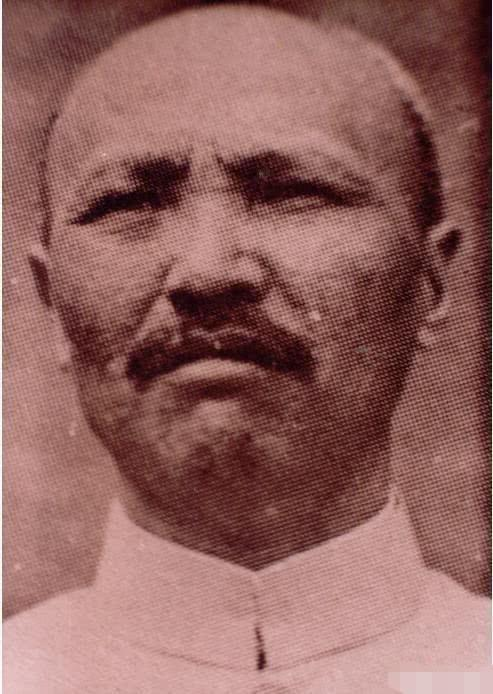
Sun Dianying, the Chinese warlord who perpetrated the 1928 demolition and mass looting of the imperial tombs of the Eastern Mausoleum complex

Sun Dianying was a commander of the Fengtian Army, who allied himself and the forces under his control with Chiang Kai-shek during the 1926 Northern Expedition. After its conclusion however, Chiang Kai-shek increasingly began the exclusion of known dissidents; Sun Dianying himself — being a former warlord — naturally became one of the primary targets of disarmament. Distrust, confounded by corruption within the Nationalist government resulted in delayed pay, food, water, and other logistical problems that consistently plagued Sun Dianying's forces under his command. This in turn led to an increase in sporadic cases of insubordination, protests, and even desertions whilst stationed in Hebei province. In face of this growing crisis, Sun Dianying proceeded to search for alternative sources of funding.

=== Ai Yuxuan Notebook ===
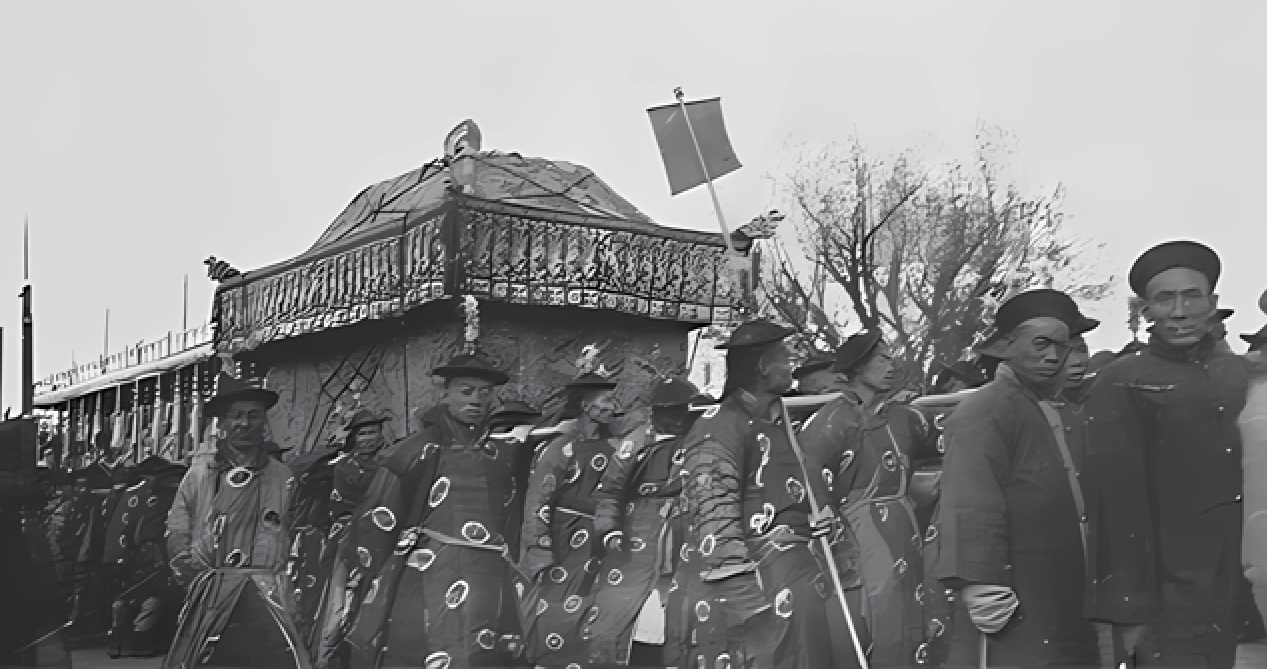
Funerary procession of the Empress Dowager Cixi.

The extremely opulent and extravagant nature of the Empress Dowager Cixi's funerary procession following her death in 15 November 1908, required a vow of secrecy on certain details by the Qing officials and head-eunuchs responsible for overseeing its planning and procurement. After the abdication of the Qing Dynasty in 1912 however, the token of secrecy over this information were no longer enforceable and were, inexorably, leaked to the public by former palace officials, the eunuchs and their relatives over the course of two decades. Some of these surviving information eventually manifested itself in the form of the 'Ai Yuxuan Notebook'; a compilation work that concerned the detail of Cixi's funerary and burial procession. Not in the least of which most significantly, were the information regarding the procurement of the vast array and amount, of treasure and unique burial items that were planned to accompany her coffin.

It was suspected that it was approximately at this point in time that the document (or most likely a copy of it) fell into the possession of Sun Dianying after having been received from two of his subordinates that had recently returned from Beijing of which, after its study, lead to the decision and planning to loot the Eastern Qing Mausoleums.

== Prelude ==
Diagram presenting the burial chamber locations of the Eastern Qing tombs.

In the early hours of June 8, 1928, warlord Sun Dianying led his army into the Eastern Mausoleums of the Qing dynasty in Malanyu, northwest of Zunhua, Hebei. This was the final resting place of the Qing emperors and empresses, and was about 120 kilometers (75 miles) from the Forbidden City of Peking. The 78-square-kilometer (30.1-square-mile) burial site was for five emperors, 15 empresses and 136 imperial concubines within 15 tombs, including the Shunzhi Emperor (1638–1661), the Kangxi Emperor (1654–1722), the Qianlong Emperor (1711–1799) and Empress Dowager Cixi (1835–1908).

== Looting operation ==
On June 12, 1928, Sun Dianying ordered a large-scale graverobbing operation that removed almost all the underground funeral objects of the Huifeiling and Yuling Mausoleums and the underground palace of Puxiangyu East Dingling. Ma Futian, Regimental Commander in the 28th Army of Zhang Zuolin, had quietly occupied Malanyu. Sun Dianying ordered Tan Wenjiang, one of his division commanders, to capture the tomb area. At dawn on July 2, Ma Futian was driven away and Tan's army looted the mausoleums in Malanyu. After that, Sun's army went straight to the area of the Eastern Qing Tombs, pretending to engage in war exercises in the area. Tan Wenjiang placed policemen all around, denying access to the area and signs declared the army was "protecting the Tombs" to prevent interference. The looting operation was directed by Sun Dianying from his car. Trucks were on hand to speed away with the loot as soon as they were loaded.

== Cixi's tomb and the Putuoyu Eastern Ding Mausoleum ==
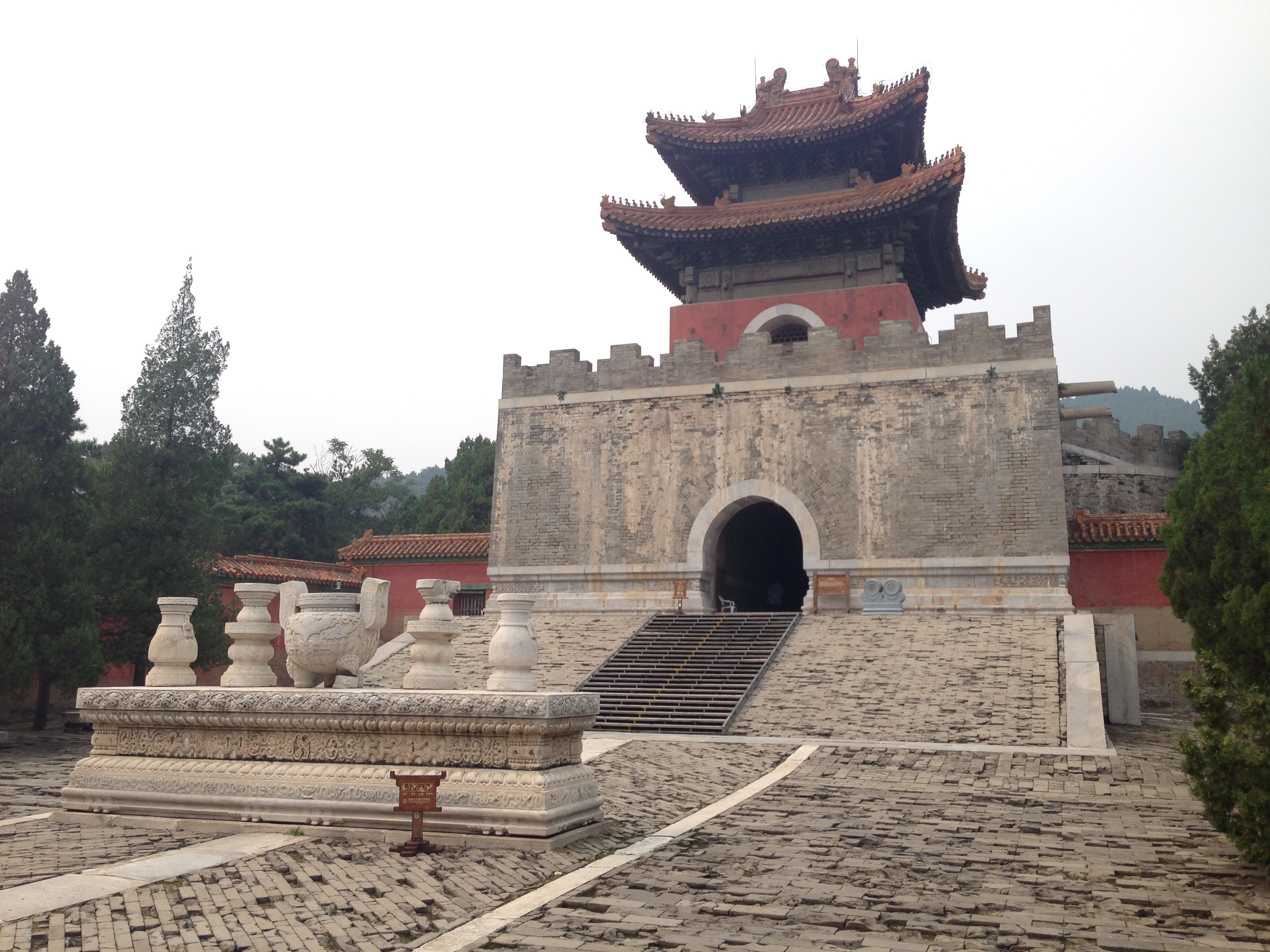
Memorial tower of Cixi's tomb.

The tomb of Empress Dowager Cixi (Dingdong Ling) was first to be targeted, and Sun gave first priority to officers above battalion commander level to collect treasure for themselves. Ordinary soldiers were eventually allowed to take the leftovers. The above-ground memorial hall was the most prominent and easily accessible structure. Upon entering, the thieves tore down the gold and brass dragon ornaments that enveloped the structure's pillars and stole the myriad of ornaments and gold medallions from the beams and eves of the building.

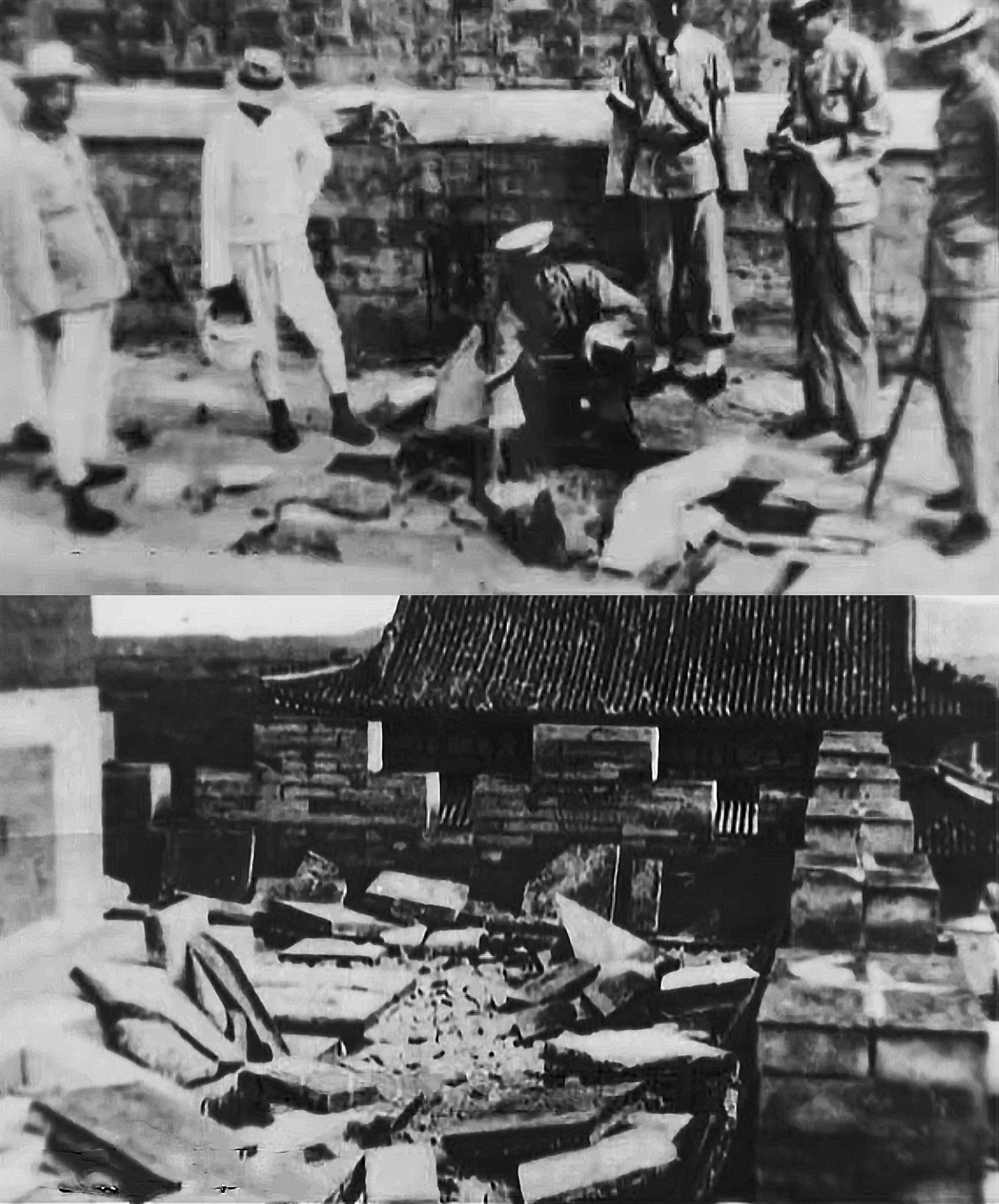
Sun Dianying's men utilized pickaxes and backhoes in their first initial attempts at locating the tomb entrance; causing extensive external damage.

Upon reaching the tomb-mound at the rear of the complex, it was realized that none amongst the perpetrators were familiar of complete layout and design of the tomb and its burial chamber. After multiple initial failed attempts at locating the burial chamber's entrance via arbitrary digging and liberal use of dynamite (resulting in extensive structural damage), a suspected former tomb-keeper from the nearby Malanyu village was brought forth, and interrogated into revealing exact location of the tomb's sealed entrance. Locating the burial chamber's entrance after only a meter of vertical digging whilst under the tomb-keeper's guidance, the looters were met by the first major obstacle; the tomb's foot-thick sealing-wall ('Diamond Wall') whose durability made it almost impervious to all pickaxes, shovels and backhoes equipped on-hand.

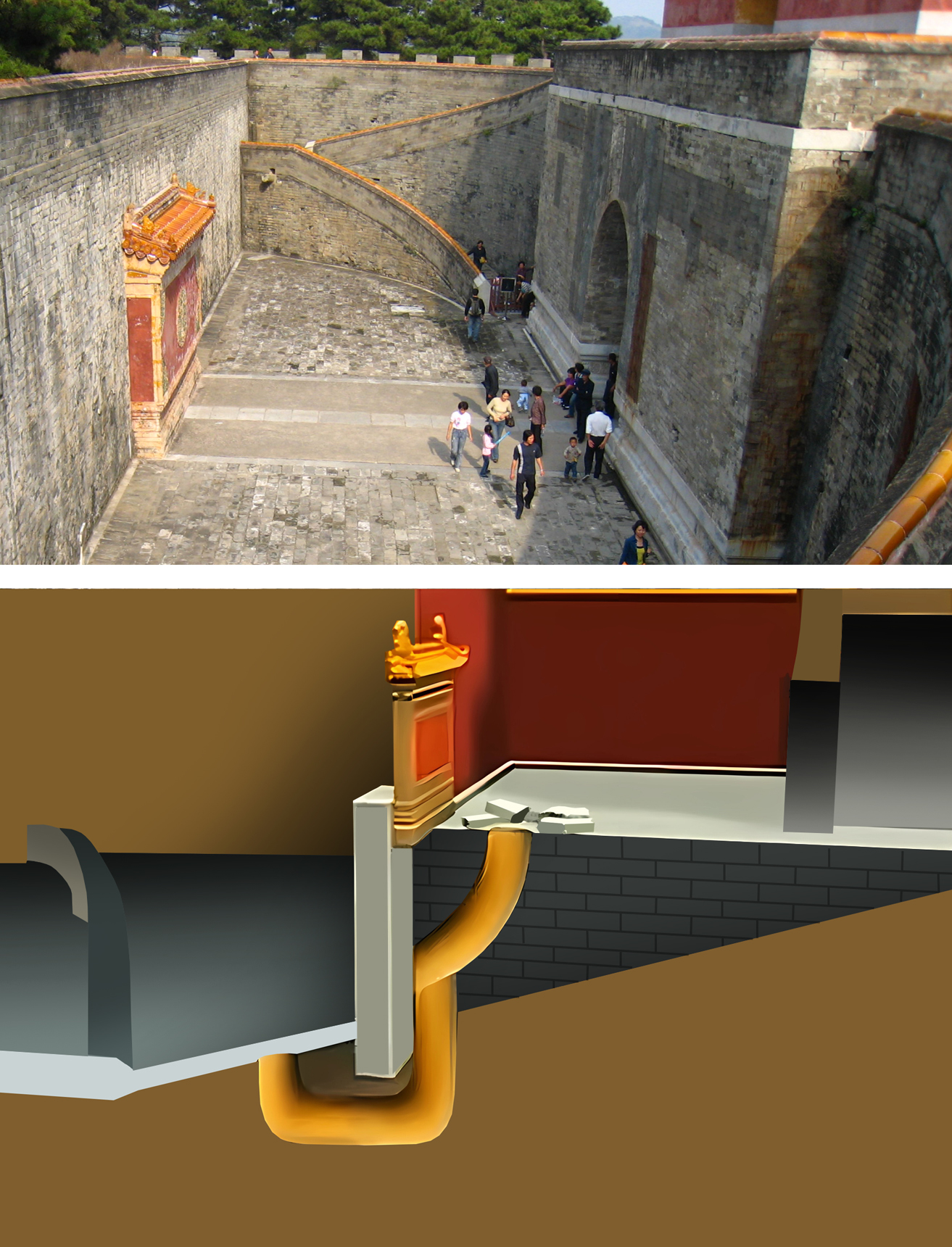
Diagram of the 'sealing-wall' of the Guangxu Emperor's tomb, bypassed via digging in the 1934 looting incident. In Cixi's case, it was breached via dynamite.

Further use of dynamite by the engineering corps was therefore required to breach this seal, opening the passage that lead into the underground palace. Traveling down the burial chamber passageway, the perpetrators reached the final major obstacle: two heavy yet durable sets of marble gates that now divided the burial chamber and the coffin itself, from the outside world. Ignorant of the locking-mechanism of this door, Sun Dianying's men first attempted to hack down and cut at the door with pickaxes and shovels that were on-hand, but to no avail (damage to the doors of which are still visible today). Peering in through the narrow slit between these doors revealed that it was barricaded by an angled bar of carved marble that served as the locking mechanism and, knowing that, was then circumvented by having it set backwards to its original position via the combined use of steel wires and thin ropes to serve as a crude pulley-system.

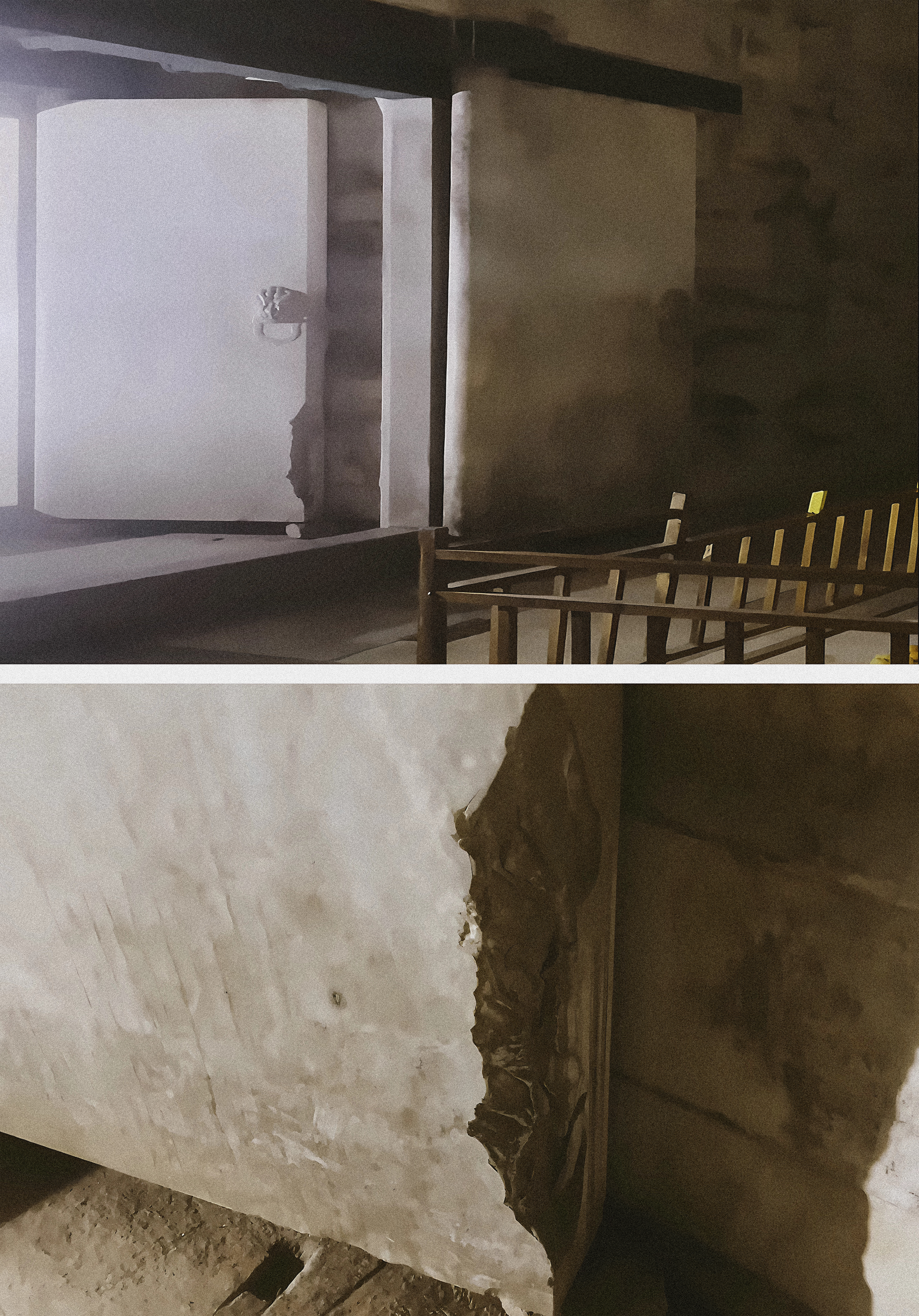
Damage to the rightmost burial-chamber stone gate caused by initial failed breaching attempt via hand-tools.

After the gates were bypassed, it was only the vermilion coffin of the Empress Dowager that now stood before them. Prying open the coffin lid, the perpetrators were met by a near-incomprehensible, almost other-worldly sight - the embalmed and still considerably well-preserved corpse of Cixi herself, wrapped in three layers of gold brocade and an additional layer of pearl approximately a foot-thick were laid around at the bottom of the coffin. On her head was a Qing imperial red-and-black Phoenix-crown also adorned with pearls, with the largest that topped the crown purportedly, being almost the diameter of a robin's egg. In addition to this were jade and tourmaline coral and lotus leaf sculptures respectively, placed at her head and foot. Within the coffin surrounding her corpse were also multiple small sculptures of horses, Arhats, Buddhas and Guanyin (Goddess of Mercy) figurines carved of gold, jade, emerald and various other gemstones. At either side of her feet were laid carved sculptures of jadeite watermelon slices, oriental fragrant melons, carved Jadeite Cabbage sculptures and multiple gemstone-carved peaches, plums, apricots and dates. Encapsulating both the corpse and the immense treasure were the four wooden walls of the coffin itself, entirely engraved with multiple golden Sanskrit excerpt passages of the Amitābha and Amitāyus Sutras, that contained blessings for reincarnation and entry into 'The Buddhist Pure Land' - a blissful spiritual place described as having wonderful adornments including jeweled ponds, colorful jeweled lotuses, raining flowers and jeweled trees that 'make the sounds of the Dharma'.

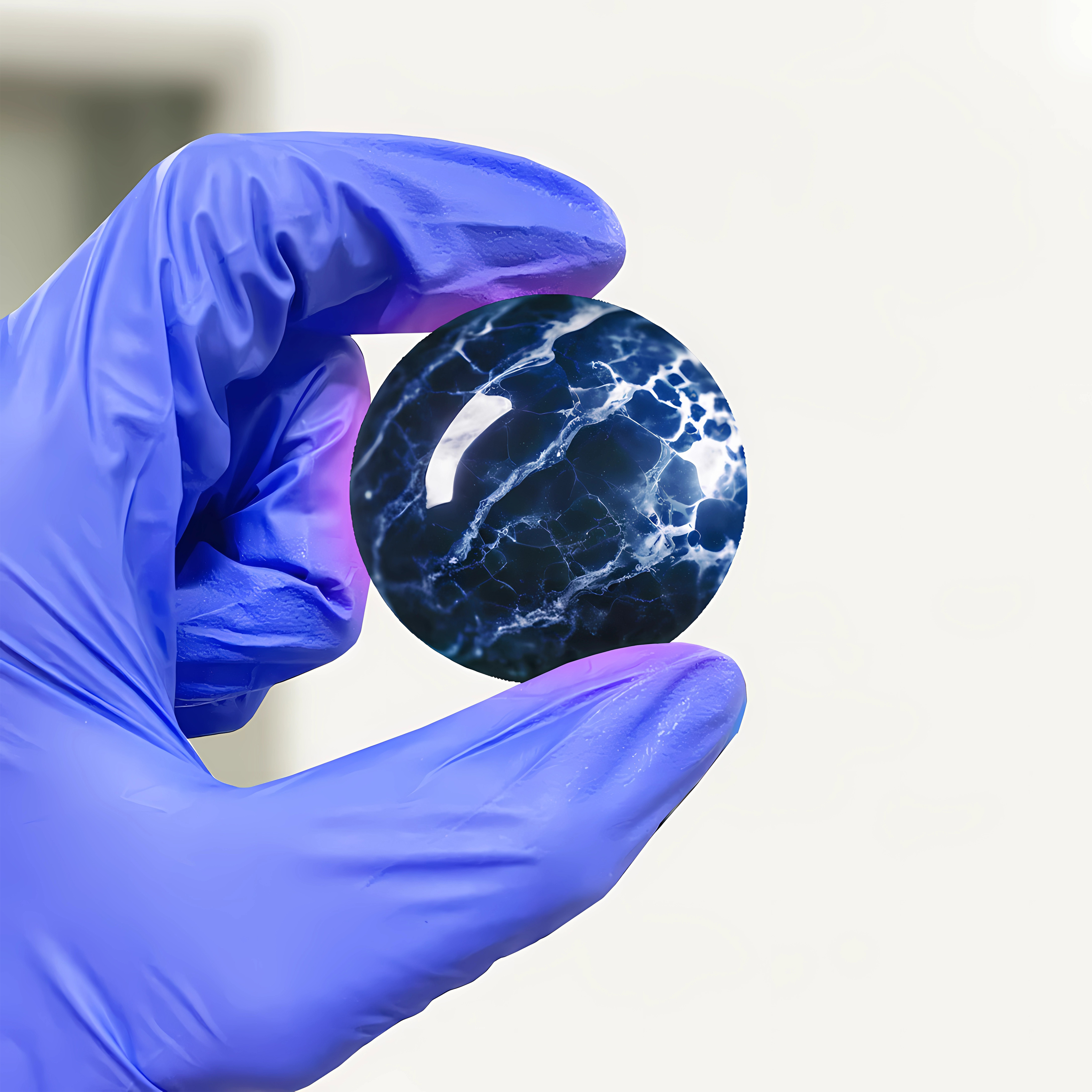
The purported fluorescent-like properties of the 'Night Pearl' possibly suggests a carved sphere consisting of fluorite, rather than a typical marine-pearl.

The looters first dragged the Empress Dowager's corpse out of the coffin and discarded her aside as if refuse before proceeding to snatch at the largest treasured objects that had been previously placed around her body, such as the Buddha statues, jadeite watermelons, jade coral and vegetables. They snatched at the objects found beneath the body, ravaged the corpse itself - taking her imperial robe; tearing off her gold-threaded undergarments, shoes and socks, and stealing all the pearls and jewels on her body. The looters then violently pried open her jaws with bayonet blades and rifle-butts in a hasty quest to extract the legendary 'Yemingzu' ('夜明珠' lit. 'Night-Pearl') described as having light-emitting fluorescent-like properties, that had purportedly been placed in Cixi's mouth following her death (to supposedly protect her corpse from decomposing, in accordance with Chinese folk-tradition). Ultimately, they looted all the objects under the coffin that had been favorites of Cixi when she was alive. Cixi's burial garments and socks — having being soiled by her twenty-years-since decomposed corpse — were subsequently discarded by the perpetrators, but not before all the sewn jewels and pearls were violently torn away. These surviving garments were recovered, restored and publicly displayed at the China National Silk Museum.

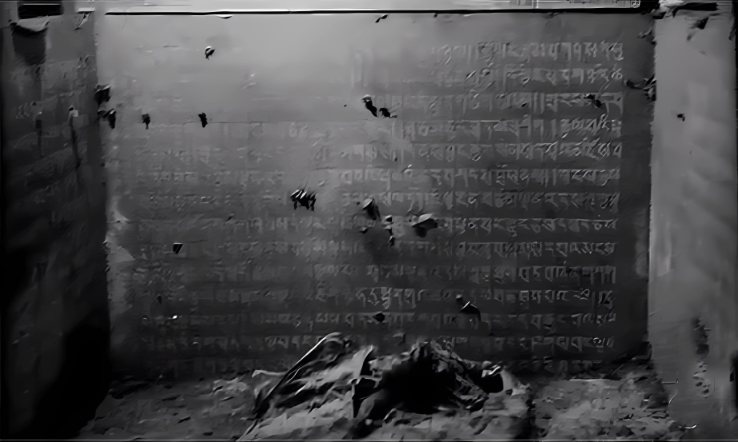
Interior of Cixi's inner-coffin as photographed by the post-1928 looting investigation, displaying engraved excerpts from the Amitābha and Amitāyus Sutras.

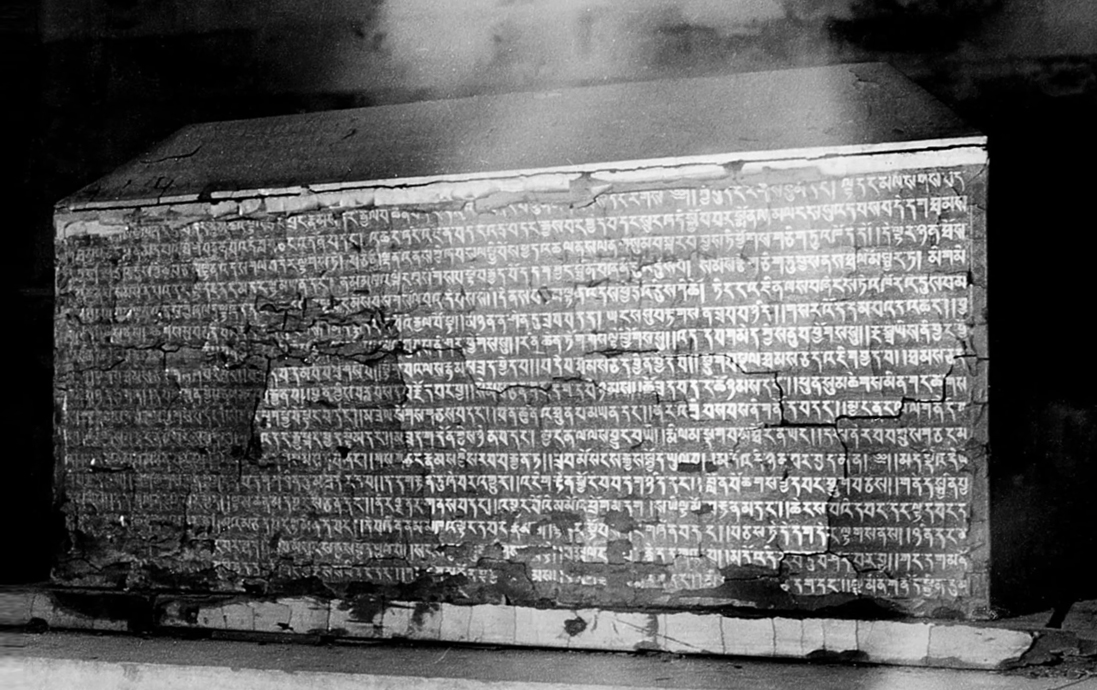
Photograph of inner-layer of the Empress Dowager Longyu's coffin, whose design was appropriated from Cixi's own.

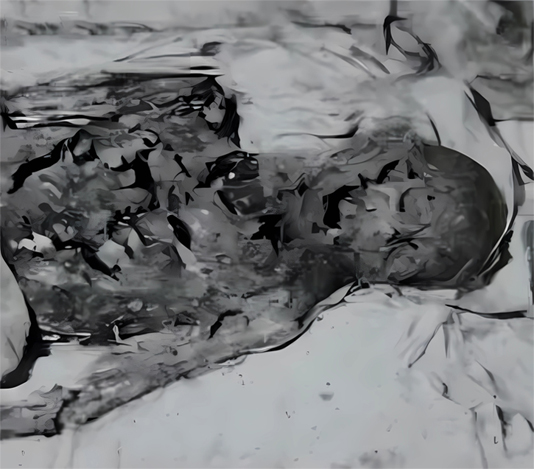
Remains of Cixi's corpse, photographed by the post-1928 looting investigations. It's rapid deterioration was the result of almost a month of exposure, exacerbated by damage from mishandling by the looters.

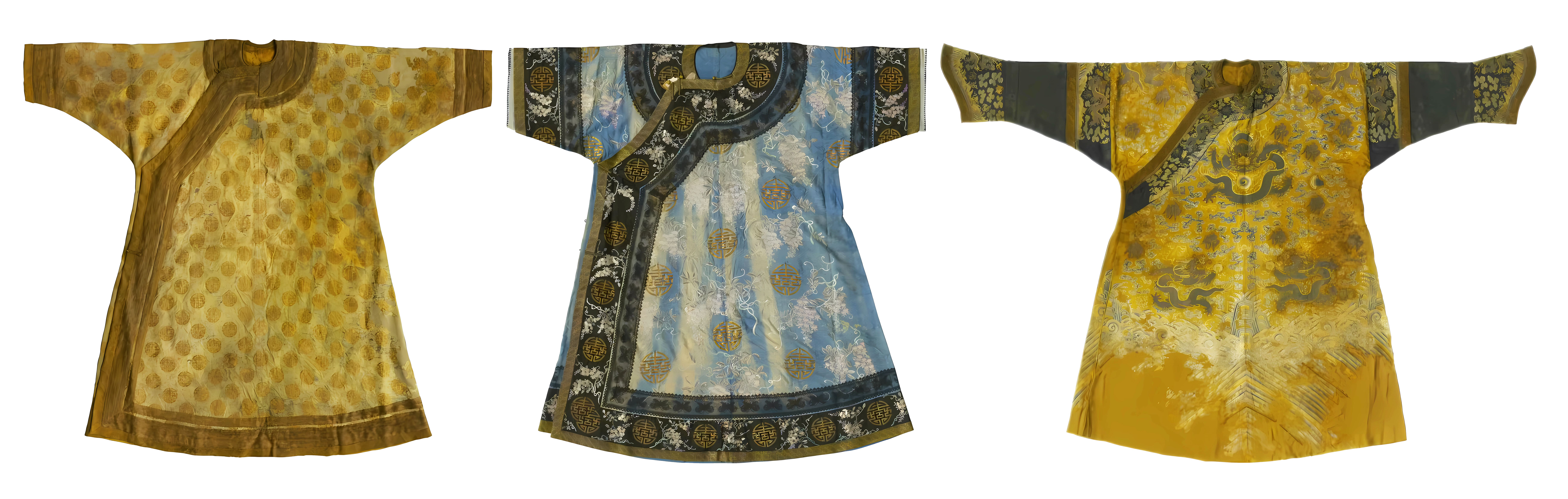
Recovered three-layer burial garment of the Empress Dowager Cixi, restored by the China National Silk Museum.

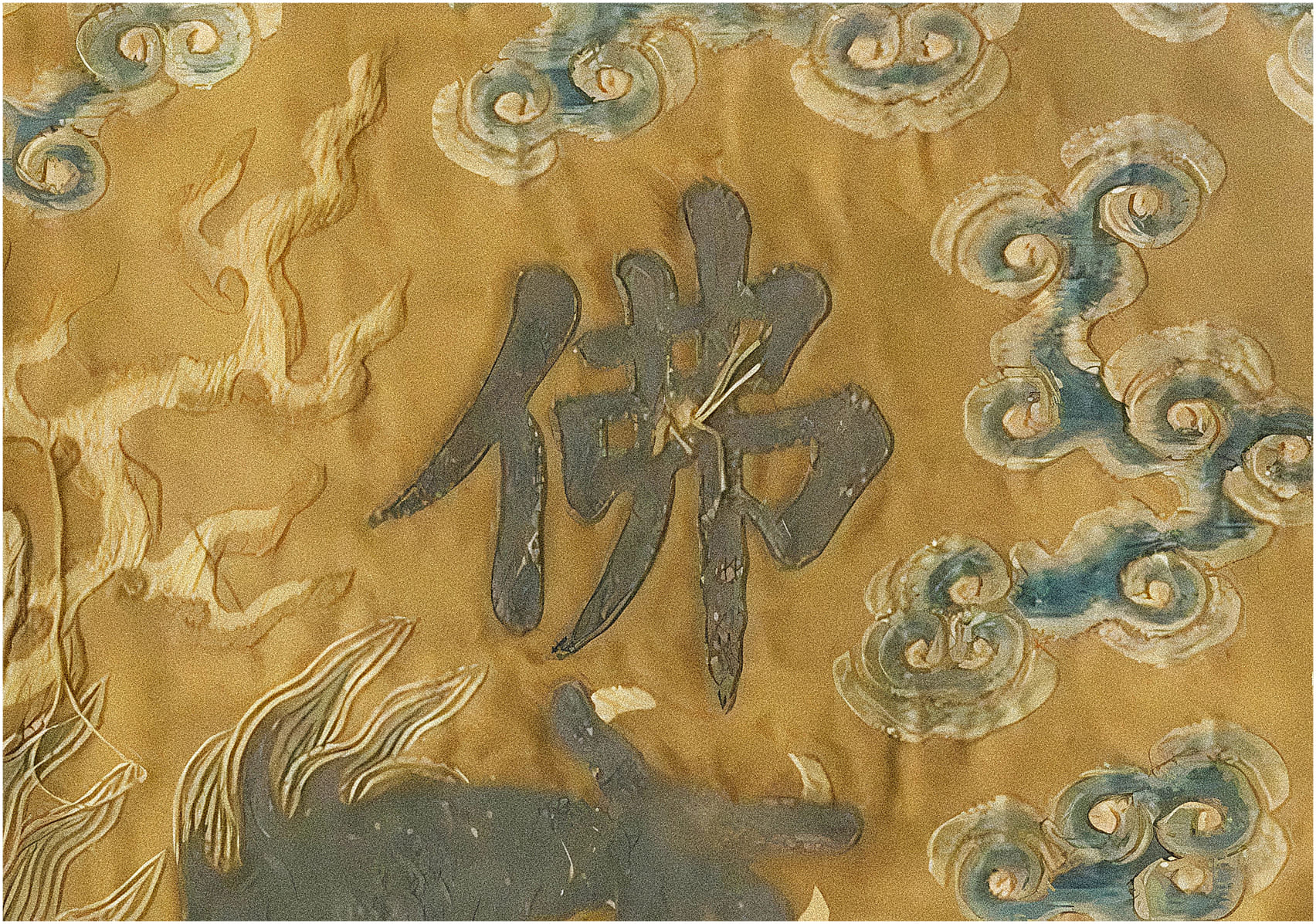
Detail of outer-most burial garment. The loose threads over the Chinese-character for Buddha ('佛') was the former position of a sewn pearl, prior to it being violently torn away.

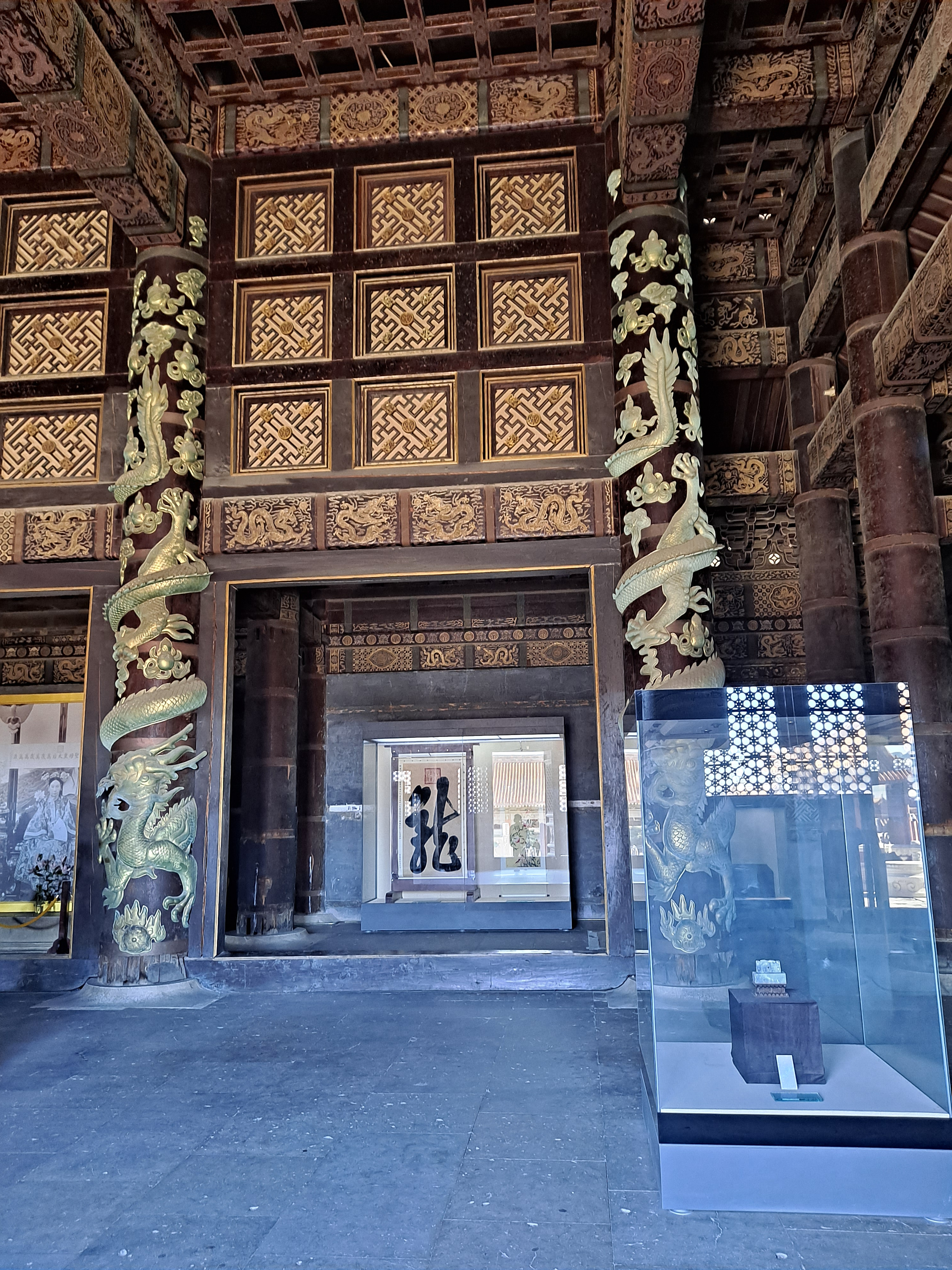
Gold-dragon decor replicas on the beams and eaves of Cixi's above-ground memorial hall; the originals were torn-down and stolen during the 1928 looting.

== Yu Mausoleum ==
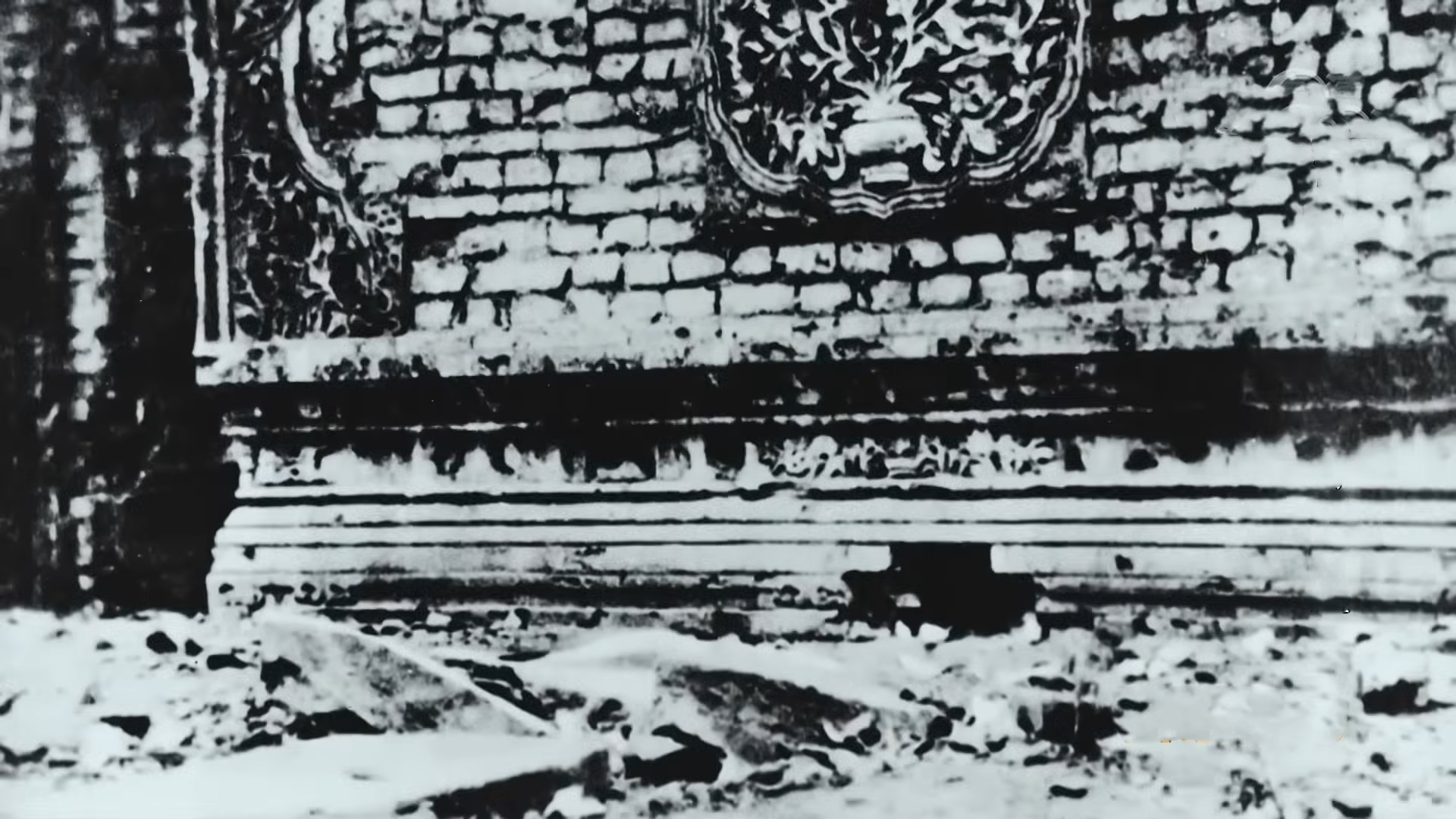
Entryway created by the use of dynamite to breach the burial chamber of the Yu Mausoleum, photographed as part of the post-1928 looting investigations.

While Tan Wenjiang was robbing Cixi's tomb, Han Dabao, a brigade commander under Sun Dianying, led another group to the Yu Mausoleum belonging to the Qianlong Emperor and declared his intention to 'conduct a war exercise'.

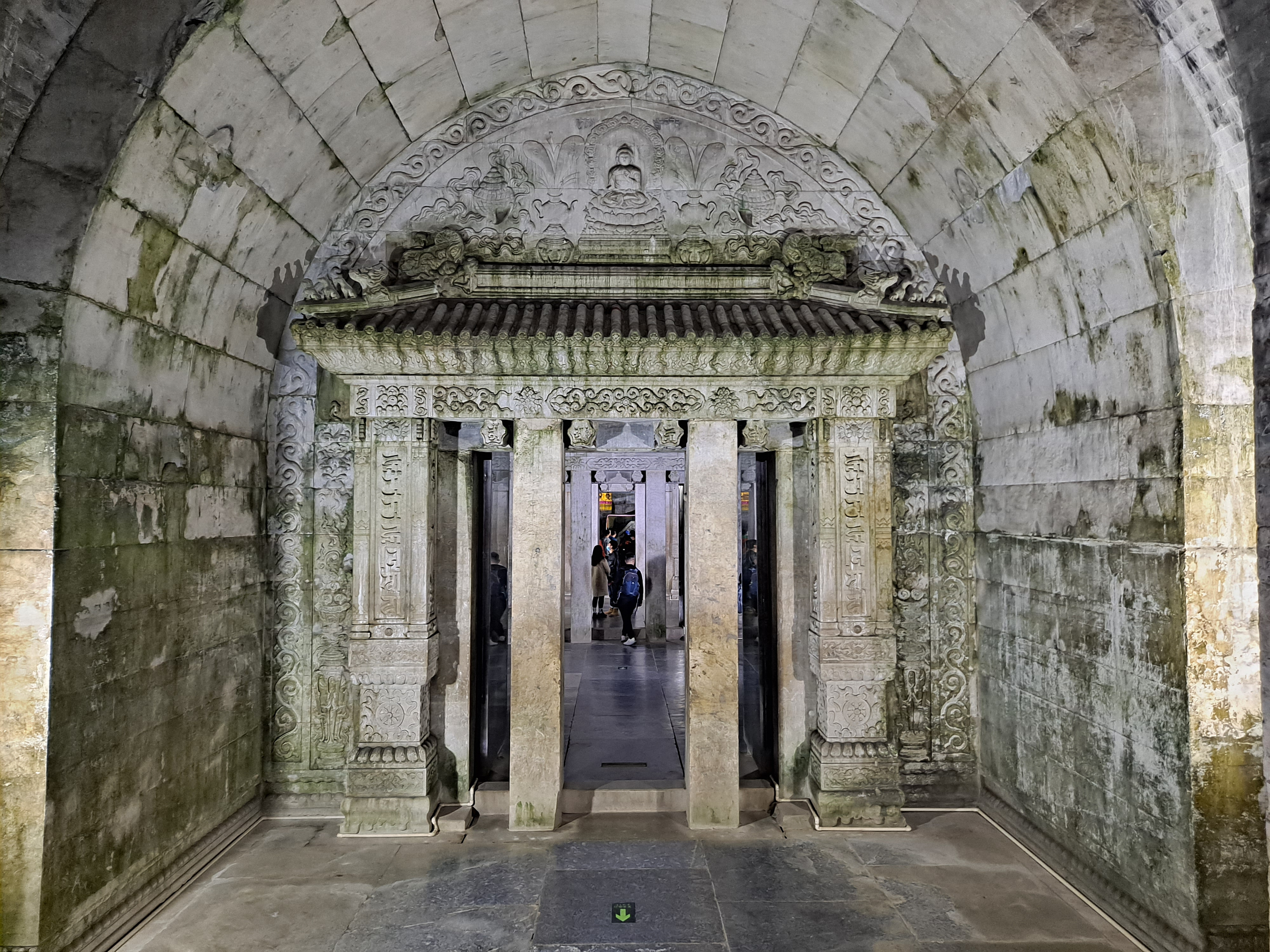
Entrance to the burial chamber of the Yu (Qianlong's) tomb. Algal residue on the leftmost wall indicates prior water levels due to flooding.

Armed with the knowledge and methodology gained after the ransacking of Cixi's Eastern Ding Mausoleum prior, the perpetrators once more breached the tomb's 'sealing-wall' with the use of dynamite as they did before. This time however they were taken by surprise by a new, unforeseen obstacle; the underground entrance and the burial chamber itself was inundated approximately by more than a few meters of stagnant water; flooding of which was a result of centuries of rain-water seepage into the chambers caused by construction methods that were not water-tight. Pumps had to be brought it to reduce the water to more tolerable levels prior to entry.

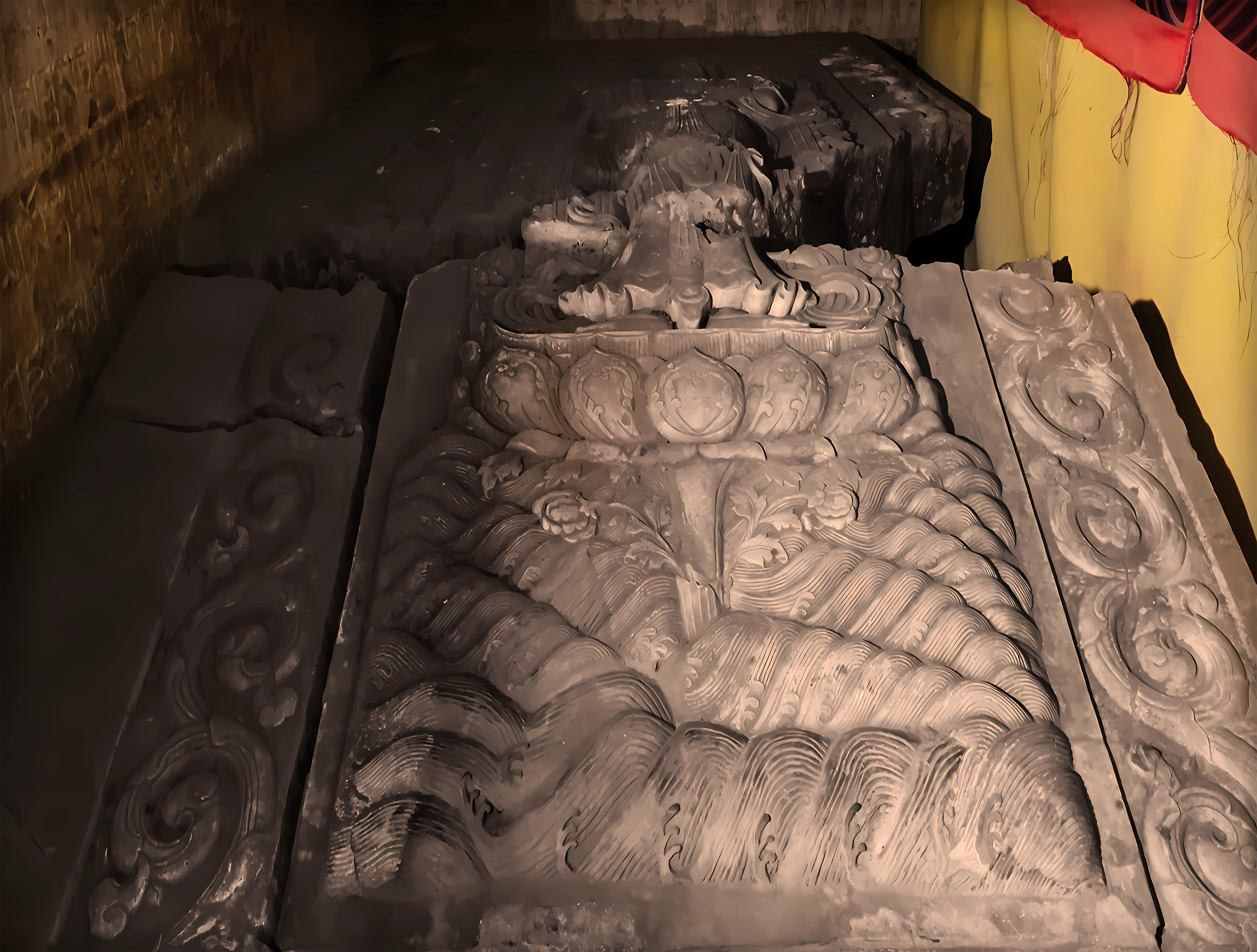
Stone gates of the Yu burial chamber, with damage caused by breaching via dynamite in 1928.

Upon reaching the final set of marble gates, the looters utilized the same method as before to unlatch the locking mechanism. Despite multiple attempts however, the gates to the burial chamber refused to open. It was later discovered that, possibly due to buoyancy, the wooden coffin of the Qianlong Emperor was lifted off from its pedestal, and then relocated itself to the marble gate of the burial chamber whilst the floodwaters were being drained - resulting in his coffin coincidentally serving as a crude ad-hoc barricade, preventing the doors from opening and delaying the thieves' entry. Nevertheless, the gates and the coffin itself inevitably yielded to the use of dynamite. The looters blew down the entrance and doorways of the underground palace and rushed into the tomb. The coffins of the Qianlong Emperor, his empress and four concubines were pried open, all the valuables looted and their remains thrown onto the mud-covered floor of the burial chamber.

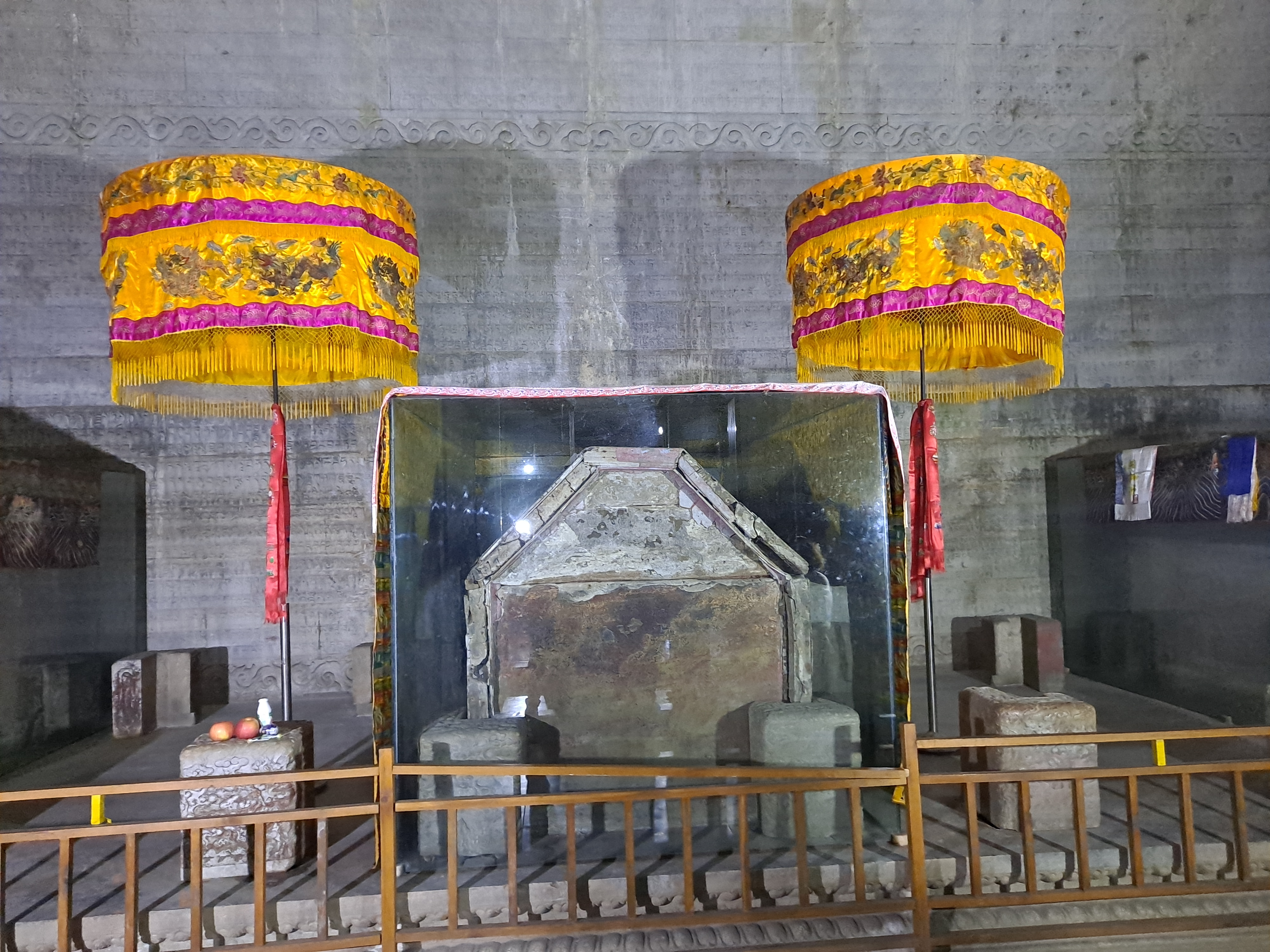
Coffin of the Qianlong Emperor.

The corpses of both the Qianlong Emperor and those interred with him were discovered to be in more worsened condition of preservation in comparison to Cixi, mostly owing to having been buried for longer, with further decomposition exacerbated by water-damage caused by centuries of flood-water inundation.

The soldiers then proceeded to the above ground Yu Mausoleum Memorial Halls and the underground palace of Puxiangyu East Dingling, and proceeded to similarly loot what they could. After removing the treasures from the graves, Sun and his army sealed the empty chambers with stones. They carted off some of China's greatest treasures, but some things could not be easily removed and the imposing buildings of the mausoleum still survive.

== Aftermath ==
=== Beijing antiquities brokerage incident ===
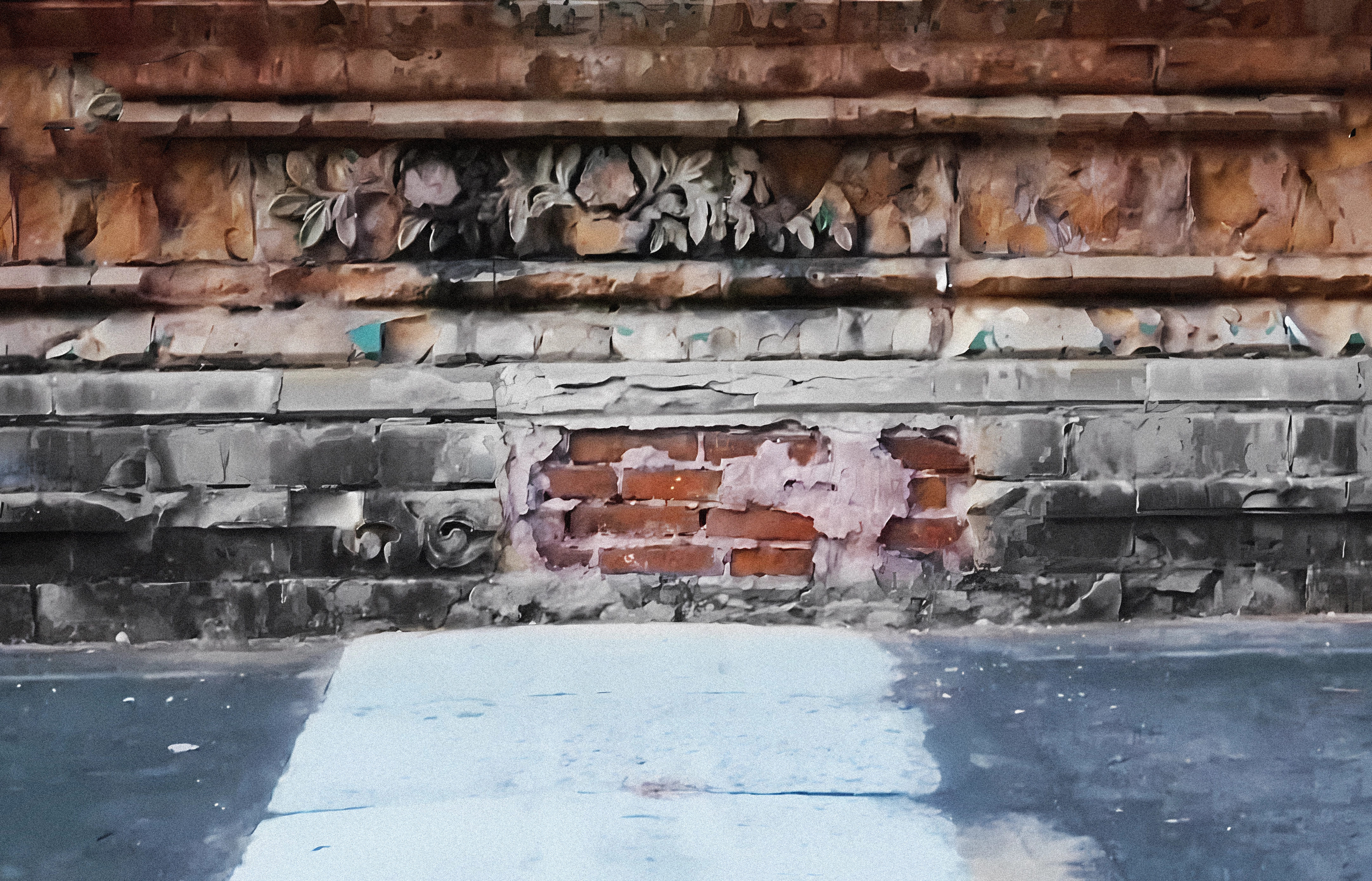
Sealed former-entryway of the Yu Mausoleum, post-looting.

On the day of the looting incident, a soldier reportedly arrived at a shop belonging to an antiquities broker in Beijing and began acting arrogantly - aiming to sell off a significant amount of valuable items that he had brought forth. The extremely regal, and valuable nature of the purported items instantly attracted the attention of fellow patrons, outside bystanders and a passing patrol of law enforcement alike. Both the soldier and the broker were subsequently arrested and transferred to the Peking Garrison Command for questioning - the suspect was revealed to be a subordinate of Sun Dianying and, under interrogation, disclosed the details of the ongoing looting operation and the source of the treasures. Sun Dianying was named as the organizer, and mastermind of the plot.

=== Public reaction ===
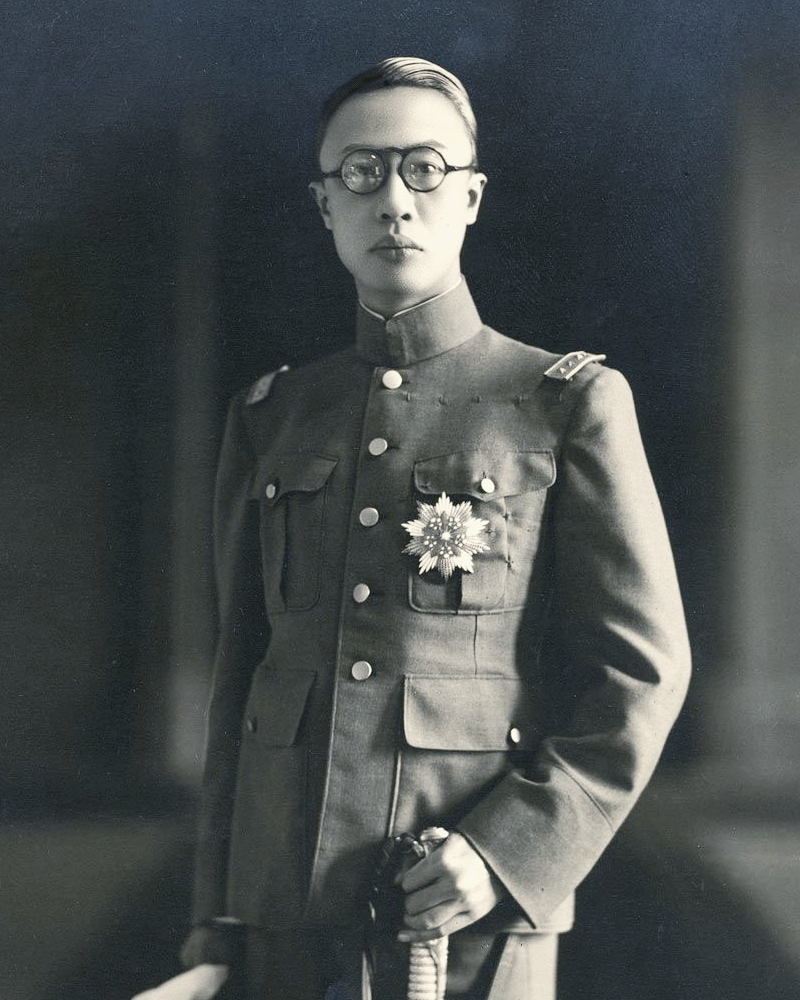
The failure in the Nationalist government in their agreed adherence in protecting the Imperial mausoleums greatly outraged the former-emperor Puyi, and contributed to his later increased sympathies with the Japanese Empire.

By near the end of June of that year a combination of hearsay, rumors and published news of the massive looting operations had spread past Hebei and had already reached as far as Beijing and Tianjin.

Public perception to the news of the looting, both within China and around the world, were mixed. Cixi herself, having consistently been a controversial figure throughout her life whom was known infamously for her arguably lavish, corrupt and vain lifestyle at the expense of the common Chinese people, that had in no shortage a part contributed to the downfall of the Qing, was interpreted by some as a crude form of karmic retribution.

Other perceptions to the crime by members of the public and the press were more negative - with many being outraged and condemning the looting of the tombs as a desecration of the ancestors, and a direct disrespect of Chinese culture. China's dethroned last emperor Puyi, who had dismissed Sun from his post sent telegrams to Chiang Kai-shek, Yan Xishan, Commander of Garrison Force in Beijing, the Central Committee of Kuomintang and local newspapers demanding strict investigation of the crime requesting for Sun Dianying to be sentenced to death. The crime, perpetrated by Sun Dianying whose forces were part of the wing of the Nationalist military was seen as a betrayal, and was one of the major contributing factors to Puyi's later increased sympathies with the Japanese Empire. Many others within Chinese society also similarly requested for punishment.

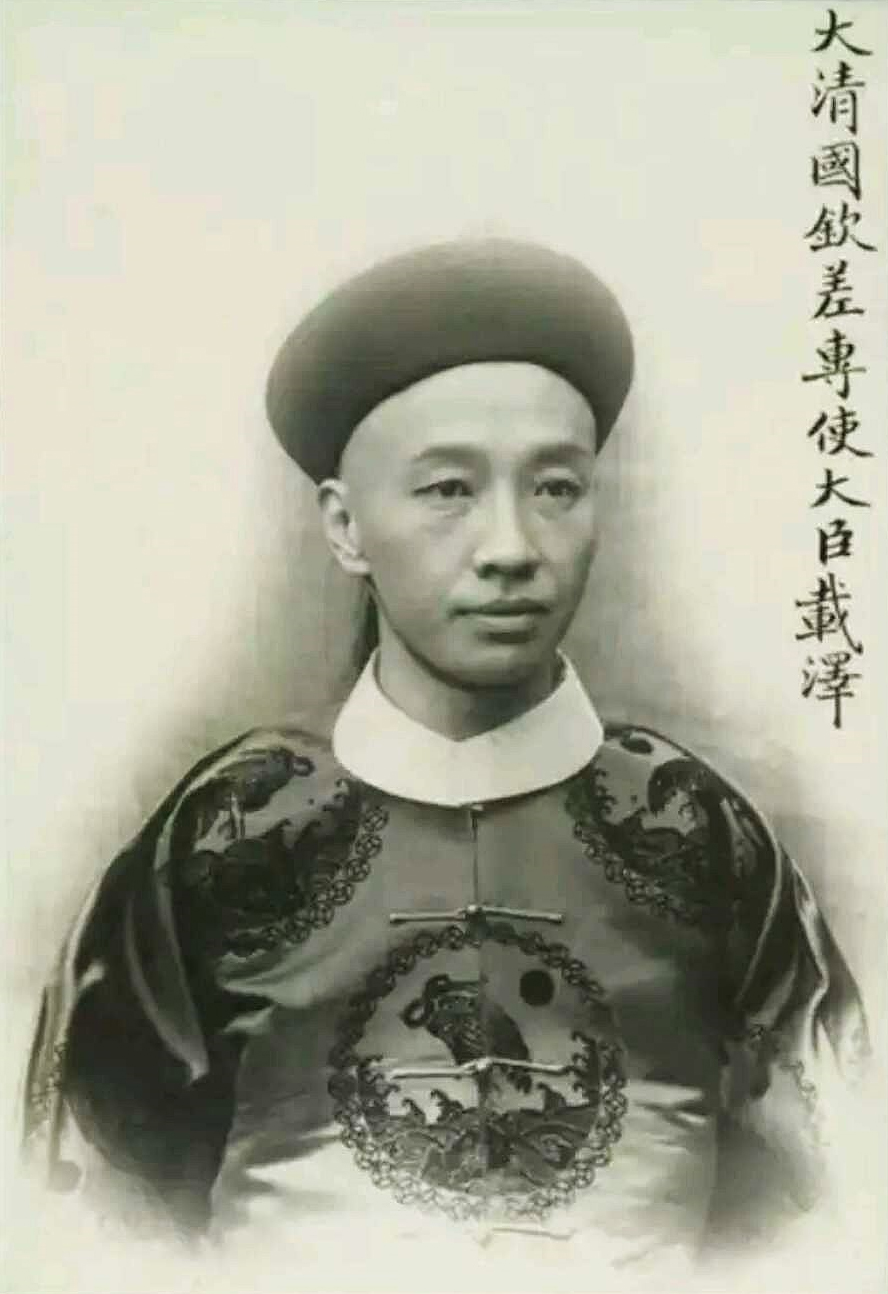
Zaize, a former Manchu-noble, was dispatched via written letter request by Puyi to evaluate the status of the tombs, and to arrange for any re-interment and repairs where deemed necessary.

As Puyi was residing in Tianjin at the time of the incident, a letter request of dispatch was sent to former Qing-noble Zaize to evaluate the status of the mausoleum complex on his behalf, and to make arrangements for any re-interment and repairs where deemed necessary. The remains of the Empress Dowager Cixi, the Qianlong Emperor, his empress and concubines were hastily re-buried, with additional restoration work on the tombs, burial chamber and coffins also undertaken. In the case of the Yuling Mausoleum, the floor of the burial chamber was discovered in a chaotic and dilapidated state with the remains and bones of all the occupants scattered about and mixed together across the burial chamber's floor. As modern DNA forensic technology and methods were not yet available to assist in distinguishing whose remains belonged to whom at the time of the crime, the remains of both the Qianlong Emperor, his empress and concubines were all gathered as one and then interred directly into the coffin of the Qianlong Emperor for expediency.

=== Fate ===
The ultimate status of the treasures looted from the Eastern Qing Tombs have to this day, remained unknown, with none yet having being positively identified or recovered, and their fate having being perpetually surrounded by an air of mystery consisting of only popular rumors, hearsay, conspiracy theories and allegations.

A list of the purportedly stolen items from the tomb of Empress Dowager Cixi published by the 16 January 1929 edition of The World's News noting the type, amount and estimated value (not adjusted for inflation) of the allegedly lost items were as follows:

- One gold-threaded mattress (£13,000).
- Two-thousand one-hundred in-woven pearls, weighing more than 2 lbs, Ten-thousand five-hundred seed pearls, rubies, sapphires, and hyacinths numbering eighty-seven, and two-hundred and three emeralds and white jade (£131,00).
- One silk-embroidered shroud, with image of the Buddha (£3,300).
  - On the shroud, an additional layer of two-thousand four-hundred pearls (£48,000).
- Jade lotus-leaf ornament weighing 11 ounces (£127,000).
- Emerald lotus flower, weighing 36 ounces (£118,000).
- Rope of pearls worn by the Empress; four-hundred and twenty large pearls, one-thousand medium, and four-thousand five-hundred small pearls, with an additional 113 lbs of other gems (£180,000).
- Mirror inset with eight-hundred pearls and thirty-five gems (£26,000).
- Tolo pall embroidered with eight-hundred and twenty large pearls (£22,000).
- Three court necklaces, two of pearls and one rubies (£370,000).
- Chaplet of pearls on the head of the Empress, with one pearl alone weighing 4 ounces (£1,500,000).
- Twenty-seven golden Buddha figures, weighing 8 ounces each, twenty-seven jade Buddhas weighing 6 ounces each, and twenty-seven gem Buddhas (£100,000).
- Two jadeite watermelons sculptures with green rind, red fruit and white seeds, and four jadeite oriental fragrant melons sculptures (£460,000).
- Ten jadeite peach sculptures, one-hundred jasper pear sculptures, sixty sapphire apricots, forty ruby dates (£14,000)
- One gem lotus root (£170,000)
- Two Jadeite Cabbage sculptures (£12,000).
- One red-coral tree by the Empress's side, with cherries and a jade bird within branch (£78,000)
- On body were laid five-hundred 'large' pearls, one-thousand 'medium' pearls, and two-thousand two-hundred 'small' pearls, with two-thousand two-hundred sapphires (£365,000)
- Network pearl coverlet woven, of six-thousand pearls (£34,000)
- Forty-eight Tibetan Buddha figures of white jade (£8,000)

Total (estimated) value: ~£3,781,700.

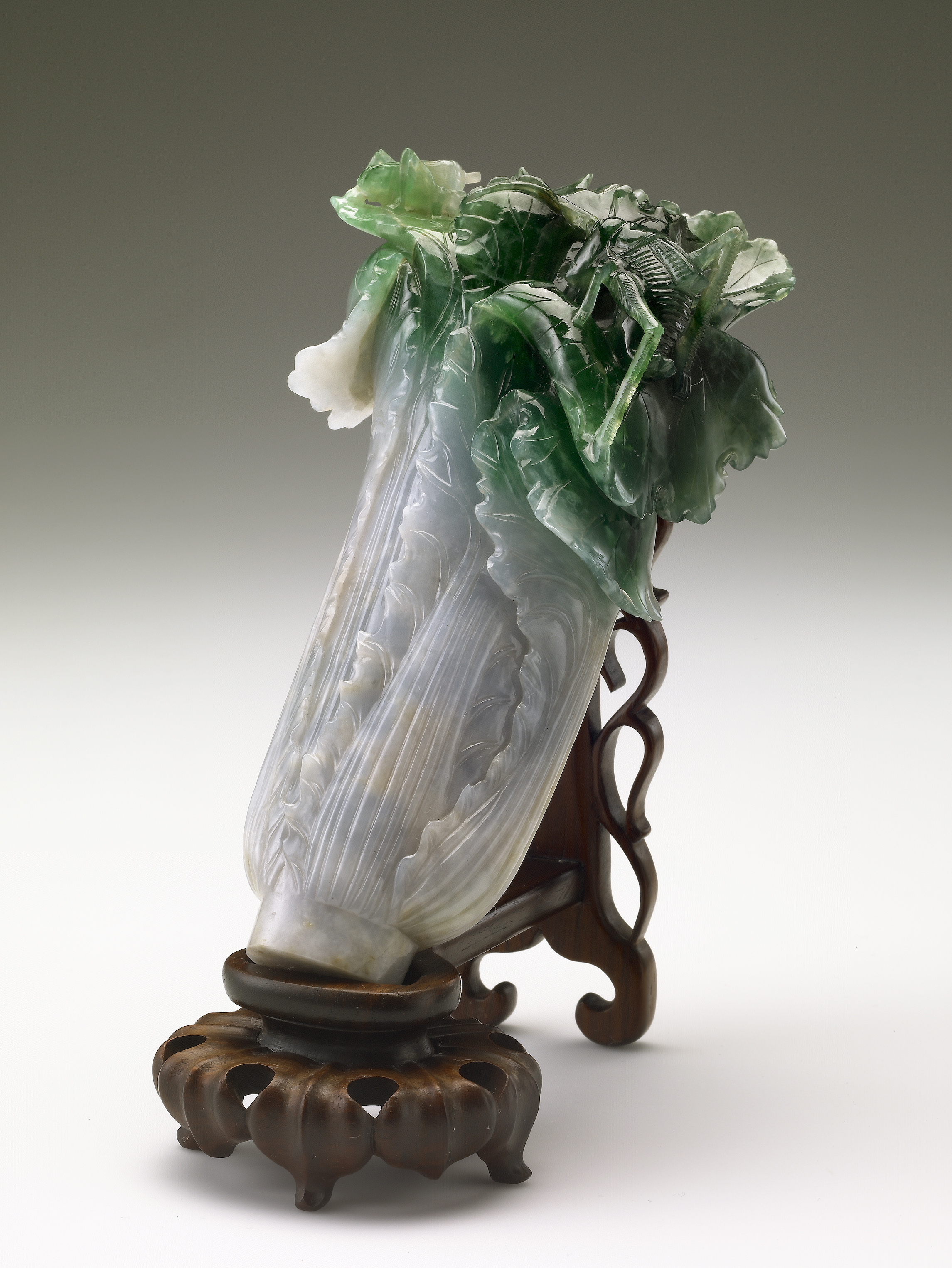
A Jadeite Cabbage, from the National Palace Museum.

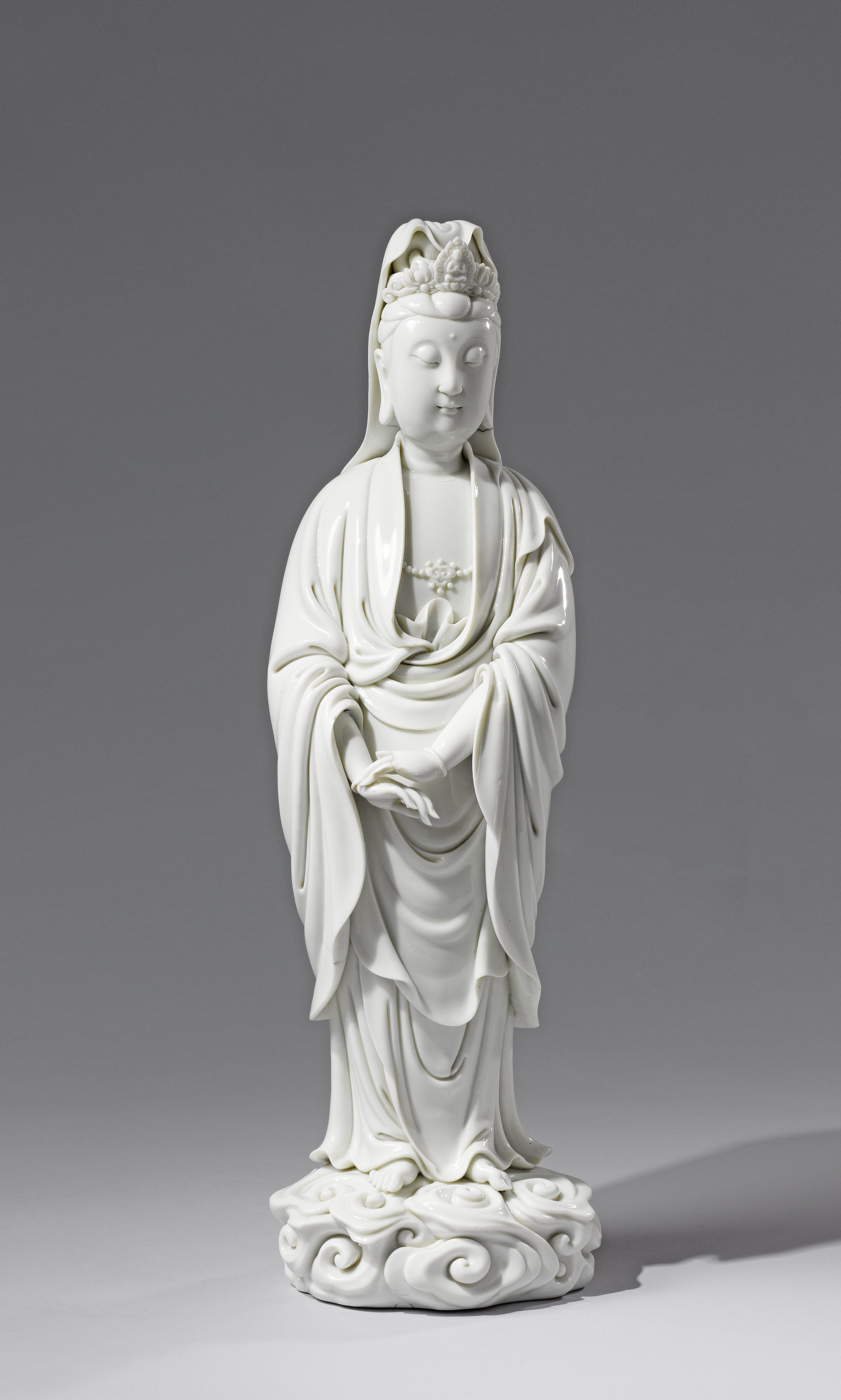
Carved sculpture of Guanyin (Goddess of Mercy).

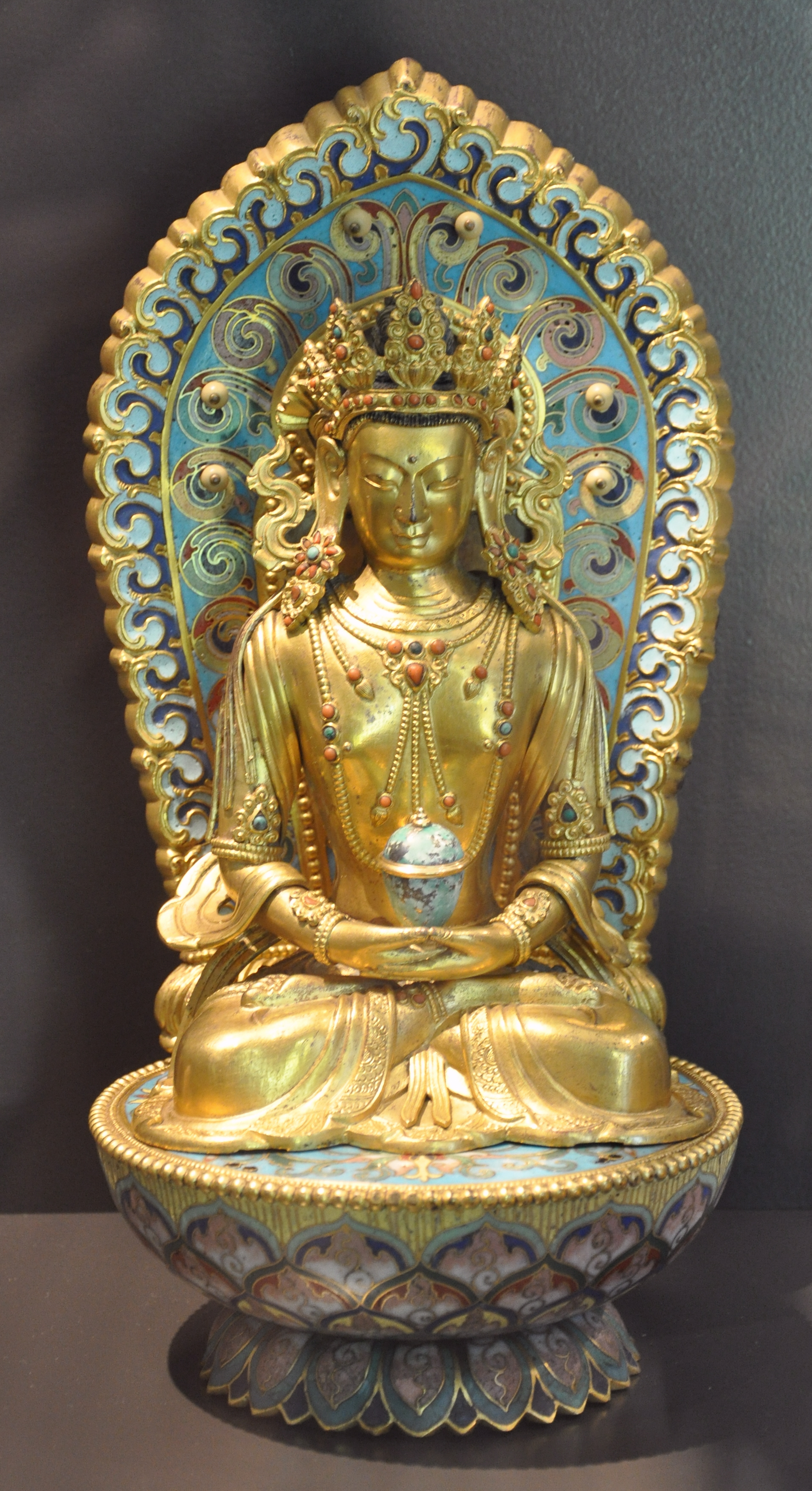
Gold Amitābha Buddha.

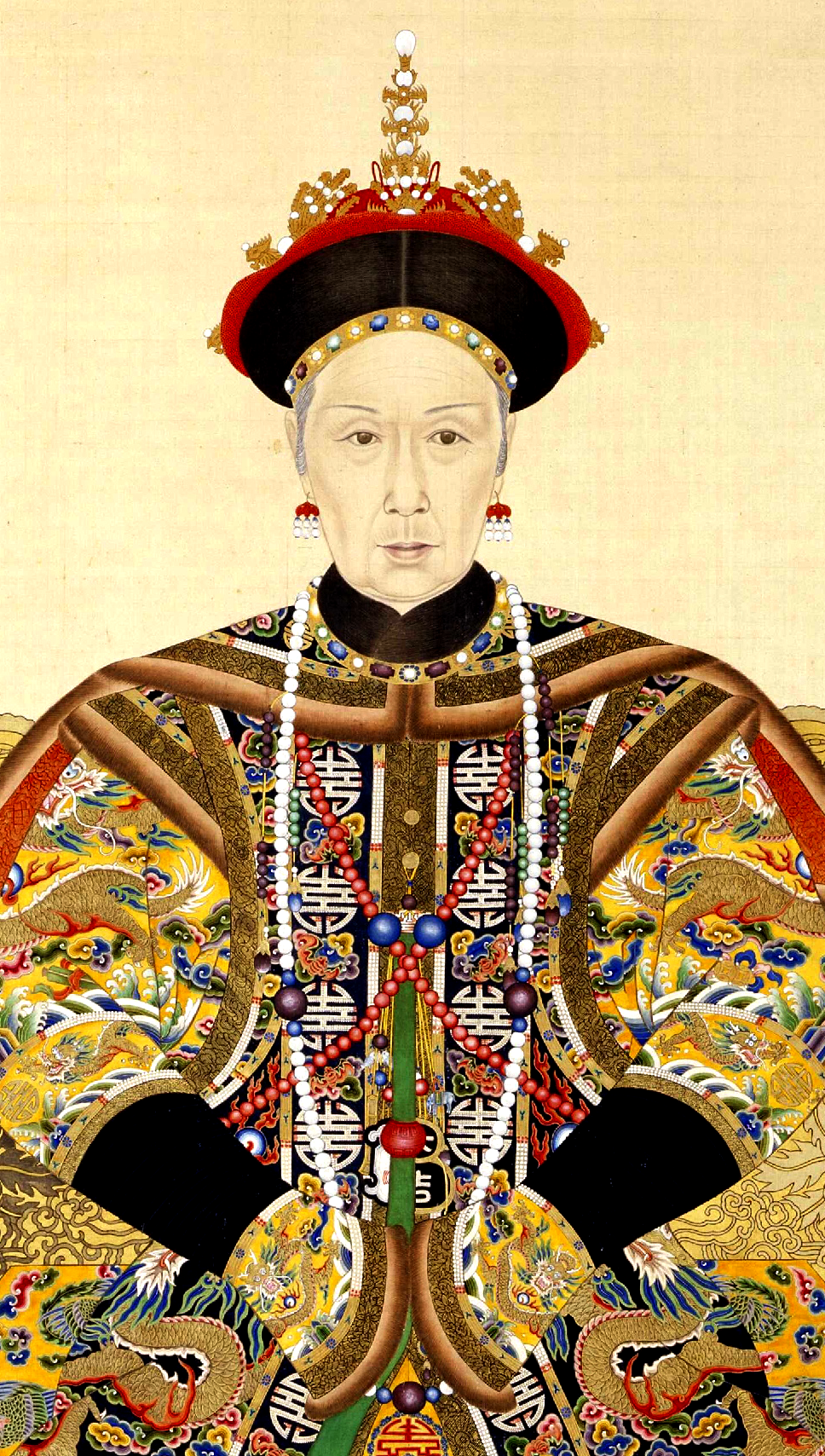
Imperial Phoenix Crown inlaid with pearls, worn by Cixi herself. Official imperial court portrait excerpt.

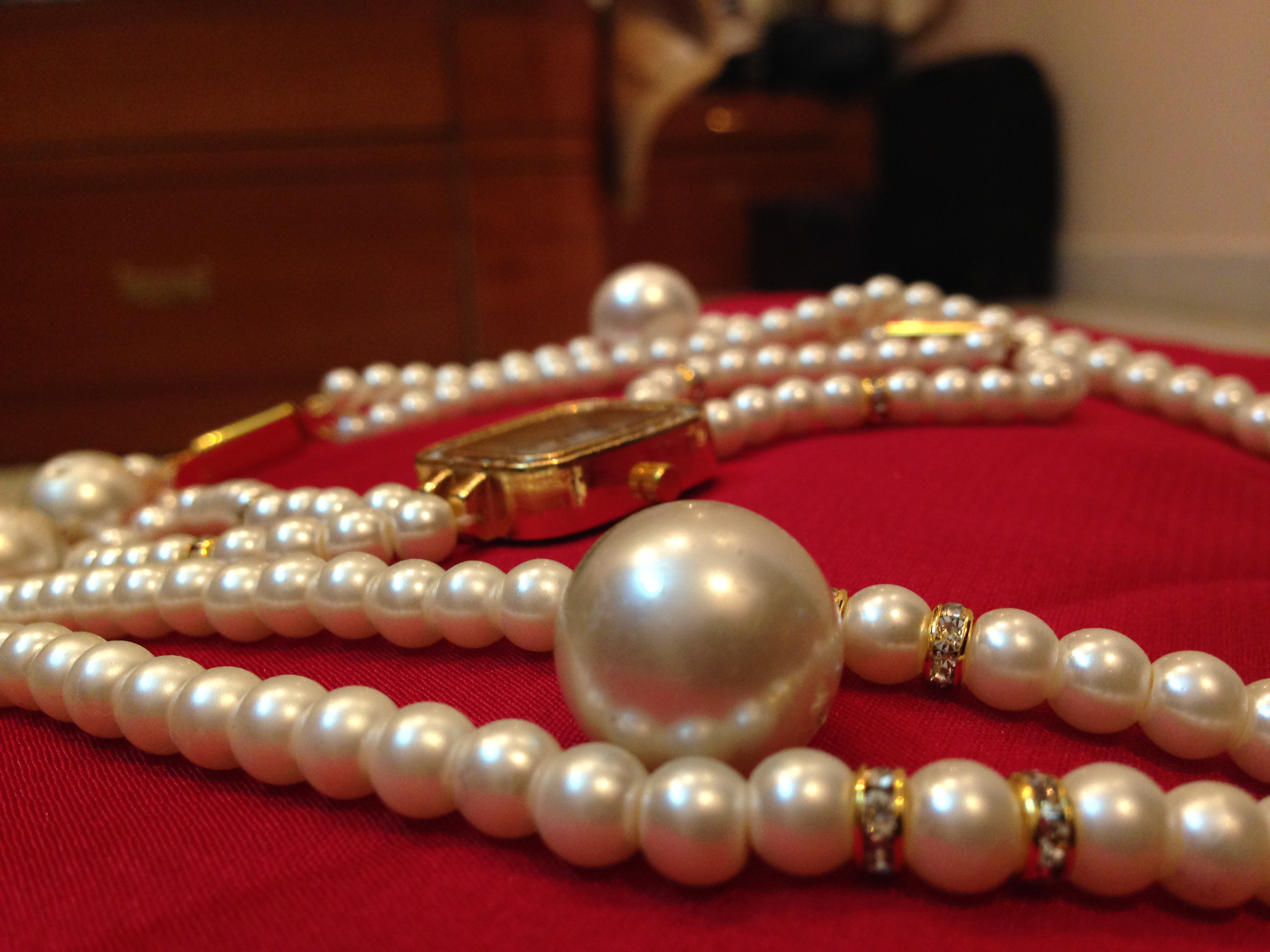
Pearl necklace.

=== Evasion ===
For a time the looting of the Eastern Tombs remained a focus of national interest. Sun Dianying, with both his name and complicity of the crime being widely circulated within national news, grew increasingly anxious. Upon realizing that if no acts of interventions were undertaken, it would be only a matter of time until he was arrested and punished with imprisonment at best, or a firing squad at worse. Therefore, Sun Dianying chose to bribe those who were in a position to discipline him in an effort to delay or prevent, any legal or punitive action taken against him, with some of the treasures both he and his subordinates obtained. Combined with the myriad of other ongoing military and political crises that plagued both the country and the Nationalist government ultimately, nothing was done and Sun Dianying went unpunished.

It is not known till this day who was bribed and with what items. In Mainland China, the most popularly perpetuated rumors allege that Sun Dianying bribed the four major families of the Kuomintang and other high-ranking members of the Republican political and military elites.

The most popularly accused, and the treasures with which they were allegedly bribed, are:

- Dai Li: The two largest scarlet beads in the string of buck beads on the neck of the Qianlong Emperor.
- Soong Tzu-wen: A jadeite watermelon sculpture.
- Soong Mei-ling: The 'Yemingzu' ('夜明珠' lit. 'Night-Pearl') once contained in the mouth of Cixi, and an additional bag of pearls.
- Chiang Kai-shek: A 'Nine-Dragon Sword' looted from the Qianlong Emperor's mausoleum. Allegedly first been given to Dai Li to be gifted personally to Chaing Kai-shek himself, before being destroyed in the plane crash that killed the former in 17 March 1946.
- Xu Yuanquan: Emerald leaves on the top of a Guanyin sculpture, a gold Buddha, a ruby Buddha, and a bag of pearls.
- Shang Zhen: A jadeite oriental fragrant melon sculpture from Cixi's mausoleum.
- Yan Xishan: A gold Buddha, emerald peaches from Cixi's Mausoleum; a jade-ring worn by Qianlong, and ivory from the Yuling Mausoleum.
- Kong Xianxi: Two strings of gemstones on the shoes of Cixi, a Jadeite Cabbage from Cixi mausoleum and a bag of pearls.
- Wang Zhonglian: Large amount of gold and other various stolen treasures - allegedley bribed by Sun Dianying after the end of the Second Sino-Japanese War in exchange for promotions and military duties.

As there currently remains no reliable substantial proof or reputable historical evidence that any of the accused ever owned or received these treasures nor did their successive family members, relatives or close associates publicly disclose and make admissions of such, the cultural relics looted from the Eastern Tombs are largely regarded as being lost; having most likely already been traded and circulated around various parts the world, stored as collector's items, or some portion possibly damaged beyond recognition - their fate unknown, and remain a matter of historical contention.

== In popular culture ==
Events depicted in the Chinese historical-drama television series The Eastern Tomb Thieves (东陵大盗).

== See also ==
- Grave robbery
- Chinese jade
- Eight Treasures
