= Dangyu =

Dangyu 党峪镇
- Town
- Dăngyù Zhèn
- Location in Hebei Location in China
- Coordinates: 39°59′26″N 118°01′04″E
- Country: People's Republic of China
- Province: Hebei
- Prefecture-level city: Tangshan
- County-level city: Zunhua

Area
  - Total: 80.22 km^{2} (30.97 sq mi)

Population (2010)
  - Total: 28,047
  - Density: 349.6/km^{2} (905/sq mi)
- Time zone: UTC+8 (China Standard)

Dangyu (Chinese: 党峪镇; pinyin: Dăngyù Zhèn) is a town located in Zunhua, Tangshan, Hebei, China. According to the 2010 census, Dangyu had a population of 28,047, including 14,592 males and 13,455 females. The population was distributed as follows: 4,757 people aged under 14, 20,344 people aged between 15 and 64, and 2,946 people aged over 65.

== See also ==
- List of township-level divisions of Hebei
