= Dongjiuzhai =

Dongjiuzhai 东旧寨镇
- Town
- Dōngjiùzhài Zhèn
- Location in Hebei Location in China
- Coordinates: 40°06′54″N 118°08′15″E
- Country: People's Republic of China
- Province: Hebei
- Prefecture-level city: Tangshan
- County-level city: Zunhua

Area
  - Total: 76.03 km^{2} (29.36 sq mi)

Population (2010)
  - Total: 24,495
  - Density: 322.2/km^{2} (834/sq mi)
- Time zone: UTC+8 (China Standard)

Dongjiuzhai (Chinese: 东旧寨镇; pinyin: Dōngjiùzhài Zhèn) is a town located in Zunhua, Tangshan, Hebei, China. According to the 2010 census, Dongjiuzhai had a population of 24,495, including 12,493 males and 12,002 females. The population was distributed as follows: 4,002 people aged under 14, 18,063 people aged between 15 and 64, and 2,430 people aged over 65.

== See also ==
- List of township-level divisions of Hebei
