= Cuijiazhuang Township =

Cuijiazhuang Township 崔家庄乡
- Rural Township
- Cuījiāzhuāng Xiāng
- Location in Hebei Location in China
- Coordinates: 40°10′47″N 118°02′07″E
- Country: People's Republic of China
- Province: Hebei
- Prefecture-level city: Tangshan
- County-level city: Zunhua

Area
  - Total: 28.64 km^{2} (11.06 sq mi)

Population (2010)
  - Total: 19,825
  - Density: 692.3/km^{2} (1,793/sq mi)
- Time zone: UTC+8 (China Standard)

Cuijiazhuang Township (Chinese: 崔家庄乡; pinyin: Cuījiāzhuāng Xiāng) is a rural township located in Zunhua, Tangshan, Hebei, China. According to the 2010 census, Cuijiazhuang Township had a population of 19,825, including 9,925 males and 9,900 females. The population was distributed as follows: 3,898 people aged under 14, 14,306 people aged between 15 and 64, and 1,621 people aged over 65.

== See also ==
- List of township-level divisions of Hebei
