= Malanyu =

Malanyu 马兰峪镇
- Town
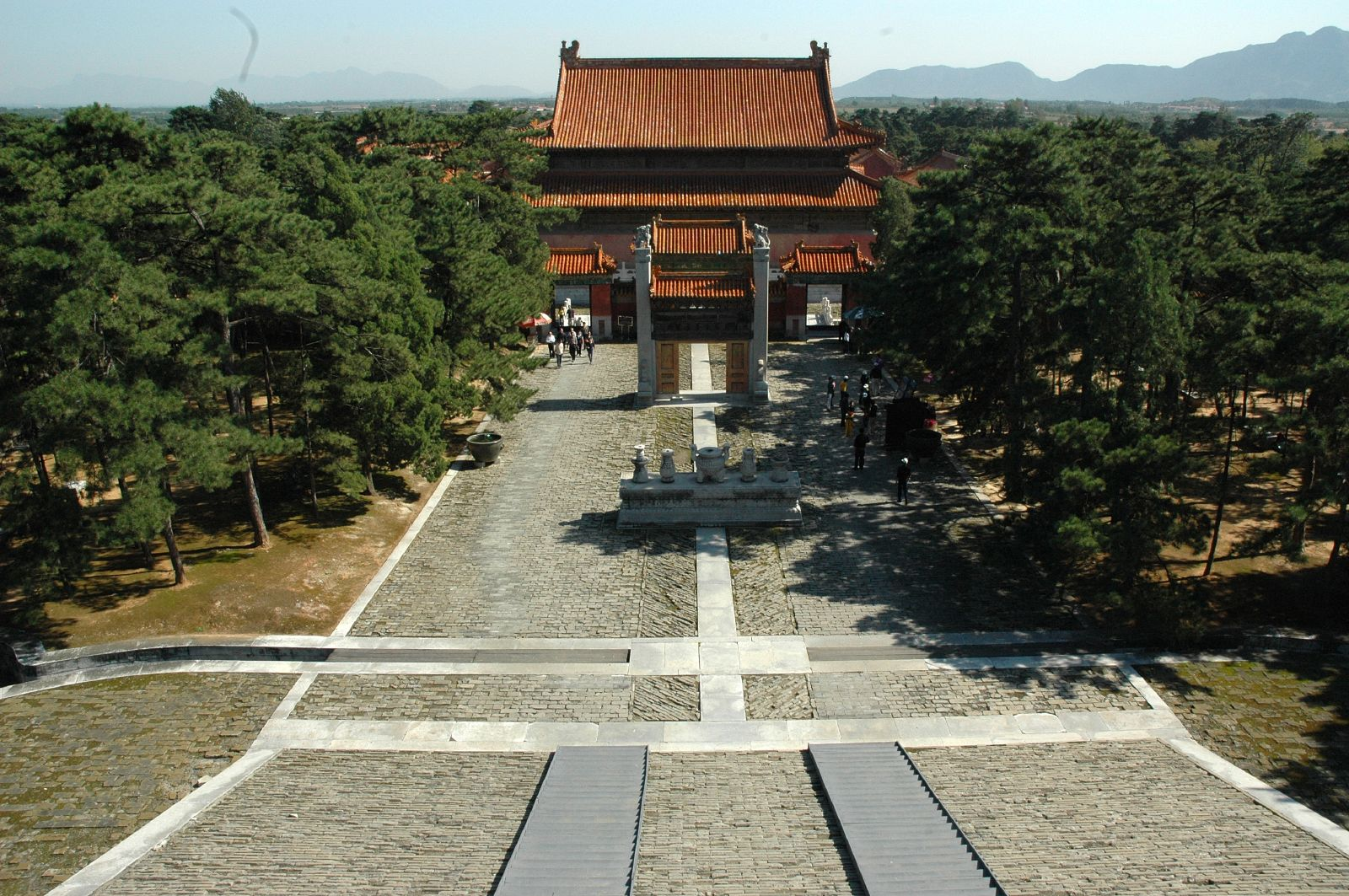

- Location in Hebei
- Coordinates (Malanyu town government): 40°11′24″N 117°42′00″E
- Country: People's Republic of China
- Province: Hebei
- Prefecture-level city: Tangshan
- County-level City: Zunhua

Area
  - Total: 52.05 km^{2} (20.10 sq mi)

Population (2018)
  - Total: 25,675
  - Density: 493.3/km^{2} (1,278/sq mi)
- Time zone: UTC+8 (China Standard)

Malanyu (simplified Chinese: 马兰峪镇; traditional Chinese: 馬蘭峪鎮; pinyin: Mǎlányù Zhèn) is a town approximately 30 kilometres (19 mi) west of the city of Zunhua, Hebei, which administrates the town, and about 120 kilometres (75 mi) from the Forbidden City in Beijing. It hosts the Eastern Qing Tombs, a site that is the final resting place of some of the Qing emperors and empresses. The 78 square kilometres (30 sq mi) site, known more widely as the Eastern Qing Tombs, is the burial place for 5 emperors, 15 empresses and 136 imperial concubines within 15 tombs, including the Shunzhi Emperor, the Kangxi Emperor, the Qianlong Emperor, and Empress Dowager Cixi. The town spans an area of 52.05 square kilometres (20.10 sq mi), and has a hukou population of 25,675 as of 2018.

== History ==
=== Ming Dynasty ===
Malanyu is home to the Yongwang Tower, a Ming-era tower.

=== Qing Dynasty ===
While on a hunting trip, the Shunzhi Emperor of the Qing dynasty, allegedly awestruck by the area's beauty, declared that he wished to be buried there. His successor, the Kangxi Emperor, began the construction of tombs on the site, now known as the Eastern Qing Tombs, in 1663. Kangxi, along with a team of both Manchu and Han planners, planned out the site, which includes a number of pathways, towers, temples, pavilions, arches, and sculptures. The Kangxi Emperor, after his reign, was buried at the site with his concubines.

=== 1928 Robbery ===
In 1928, the Eastern Qing Tombs were robbed in a large-scale looting orchestrated by local warlord Sun Dianying, and his subordinate, Tan Wenjiang. Despite widespread outrage at the looting, even by top Chinese officials, Sun faced no reprocussions.

== Administrative divisions ==
Malanyu is divided into 1 neighborhood committee and 25 administrative villages. There are 30 natural villages (Chinese: 自然村) in Malanyu.

== Demographics ==
Malanyu is one of the two minority-majority towns in Zunhua, with Han Chinese constituting only 13% of the town's population. While most of the people in Malanyu are ethnically Manchu, there are also significant Mongol and Hui populations.
