= Baozidian =

Baozidian 堡子店镇
- Town
- Băozidiàn Zhèn
- Location in Hebei Location in China
- Coordinates: 40°09′37″N 117°49′31″E
- Country: People's Republic of China
- Province: Hebei
- Prefecture-level city: Tangshan
- County-level city: Zunhua

Area
  - Total: 67.74 km^{2} (26.15 sq mi)

Population (2010)
  - Total: 38,659
  - Density: 570.7/km^{2} (1,478/sq mi)
- Time zone: UTC+8 (China Standard)

Baozidian (Chinese: 堡子店镇; pinyin: Băozidiàn Zhèn) is a town in Zunhua City, Tangshan, Hebei, China. According to the 2010 census, Baozidian had a population of 38,659, including 19,600 males and 19,059 females. The population was distributed as follows: 7,016 people aged under 14, 28,075 people aged between 15 and 64, and 3,568 people aged over 65.

== See also ==
- List of township-level divisions of Hebei
