= Dongxinzhuang =

Dongxinzhuang 东新庄镇
- Town
- Dōngxīnzhuāng Zhèn
- Location in Hebei Location in China
- Coordinates: 40°04′07″N 117°52′48″E
- Country: People's Republic of China
- Province: Hebei
- Prefecture-level city: Tangshan
- County-level city: Zunhua

Area
  - Total: 63.07 km^{2} (24.35 sq mi)

Population (2010)
  - Total: 36,428
  - Density: 577.6/km^{2} (1,496/sq mi)
- Time zone: UTC+8 (China Standard)

Dongxinzhuang (Chinese: 东新庄镇; pinyin: Dōngxīnzhuāng Zhèn) is a town located in Zunhua, Tangshan, Hebei, China. According to the 2010 census, Dongxinzhuang had a population of 36,428, including 18,392 males and 18,036 females. The population was distributed as follows: 5,700 people aged under 14, 27,074 people aged between 15 and 64, and 3,654 people aged over 65.

== See also ==
- List of township-level divisions of Hebei
