= Zunhua =

Zunhua 遵化市 Tsunhwa
- County-level city
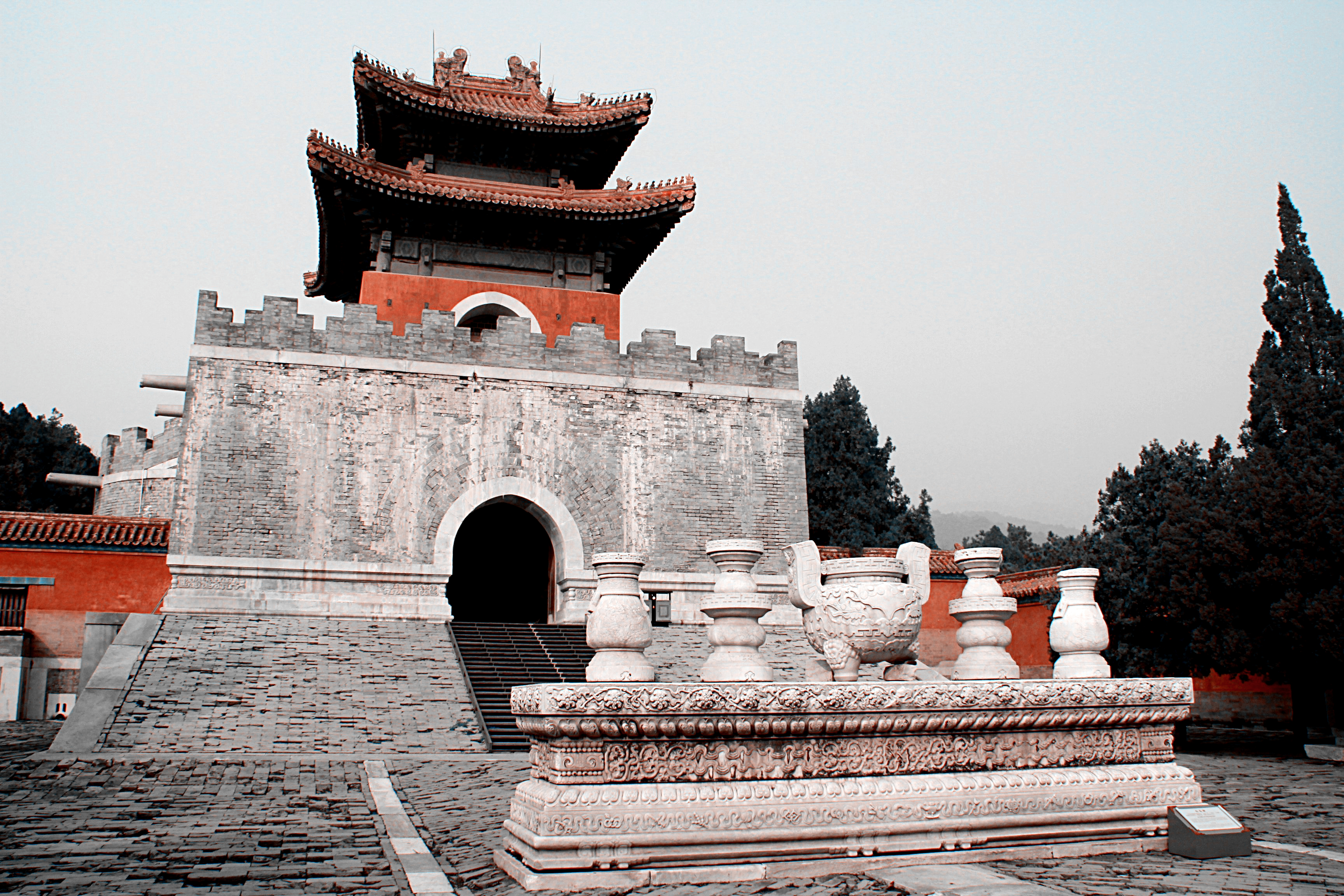
- The tomb of Empress Dowager Cixi in Zunhua

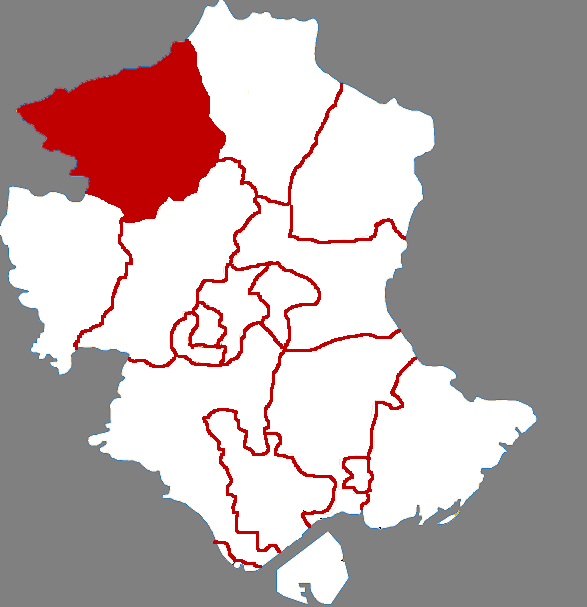

- Location in Hebei
- Coordinates (Zunhua municipal government): 40°11′20″N 117°57′58″E
- Country: People's Republic of China
- Province: Hebei
- Prefecture-level city: Tangshan

Area
  - County-level city: 1,521.0 km^{2} (587.3 sq mi)
  - Urban: 85.80 km^{2} (33.13 sq mi)

Population (2020)
  - County-level city: 707,047
  - Urban: 392,821
- Time zone: UTC+8 (China Standard)

Zunhua (Chinese: 遵化; pinyin: Zūnhuà) is a county-level city in the northeast of Hebei province, China, bordering Tianjin to the west. It is under the administration of the prefecture-level city of Tangshan. Historic sites include the Eastern Qing Tombs (Qing Dongling).

== Administrative divisions ==
Zunhua has jurisdiction over 2 subdistricts, 13 towns, and 12 townships.

=== Subdistricts ===
Zunhua contains the subdistricts of Huaming Road Subdistrict (华明路街道) and Wenhua Road Subdistrict (文化路街道).

=== Towns ===
Zunhua contains the following 13 towns:

- Zunhua (遵化镇)
- Baozidian (堡子店镇)
- Malanyu (马兰峪镇)
- Ping'ancheng (平安城镇)
- Dongxinzhuang (东新庄镇)
- Xindianzi (新店子镇)
- Dangyu (党峪镇)
- Dibeitou (地北头镇)
- Dongjiuzhai (东旧寨镇)
- Tiechang (铁厂镇)
- Sujiawa (苏家洼镇)
- Jianming (建明镇)
- Shimen (石门镇)

=== Townships ===
Zunhua contains the following 12 townships, of which, 3 are Manchu ethnic townships:

- Xiliucun Township (西留村乡)
- Cuijiazhuang Township (崔家庄乡)
- Xingwangzhai Township (兴旺寨乡)
- Liubeizhai Township (刘备寨乡)
- Tuanpiaozhuang Township (团瓢庄乡)
- Niangniangzhuang Township (娘娘庄乡)
- Xisanli Township (西三里乡)
- Houjiazhai Township (候家寨乡)
- Xiaochang Township (小厂乡)
- Xixiaying Manchu Ethnic Township (西下营满族乡)
- Tangquan Manchu Ethnic Township (汤泉满族乡)
- Dongling Manchu Ethnic Township (东陵满族乡)

== Geography ==
Most of the city's terrain consists of small mountains, hills, and valleys, and a number of rivers, such as the Sha, Li, Lin, and Weijin flow through the city. Significant mountains in Zunhua include Jiufeng Mountain, Taohua Mountain, Wolong Mountain, and Huanghua Mountain.

== Climate ==
Climate data for Zunhua, elevation 55 m (180 ft), (1991–2020 normals, extremes 1981–2025)
Month	Jan	Feb	Mar	Apr	May	Jun	Jul	Aug	Sep	Oct	Nov	Dec	Year
Record high °C (°F)	13.4 (56.1)	18.3 (64.9)	29.6 (85.3)	31.7 (89.1)	36.7 (98.1)	38.7 (101.7)	40.5 (104.9)	36.6 (97.9)	35.1 (95.2)	30.5 (86.9)	21.0 (69.8)	13.9 (57.0)	40.5 (104.9)
Mean daily maximum °C (°F)	1.5 (34.7)	5.5 (41.9)	12.5 (54.5)	20.5 (68.9)	26.8 (80.2)	30.3 (86.5)	31.4 (88.5)	30.6 (87.1)	26.4 (79.5)	19.1 (66.4)	9.8 (49.6)	2.8 (37.0)	18.1 (64.6)
Daily mean °C (°F)	−4.9 (23.2)	−1.0 (30.2)	6.1 (43.0)	14.2 (57.6)	20.4 (68.7)	24.4 (75.9)	26.5 (79.7)	25.5 (77.9)	20.4 (68.7)	12.5 (54.5)	3.7 (38.7)	−3.0 (26.6)	12.1 (53.7)
Mean daily minimum °C (°F)	−9.9 (14.2)	−6.4 (20.5)	0.2 (32.4)	7.8 (46.0)	13.9 (57.0)	18.9 (66.0)	22.1 (71.8)	21.1 (70.0)	15.2 (59.4)	7.1 (44.8)	−1.0 (30.2)	−7.4 (18.7)	6.8 (44.3)
Record low °C (°F)	−25.7 (−14.3)	−20.2 (−4.4)	−11.8 (10.8)	−4.0 (24.8)	3.7 (38.7)	9.2 (48.6)	14.7 (58.5)	11.8 (53.2)	1.1 (34.0)	−6.1 (21.0)	−16.8 (1.8)	−20.8 (−5.4)	−25.7 (−14.3)
Average precipitation mm (inches)	2.7 (0.11)	3.7 (0.15)	8.2 (0.32)	22.4 (0.88)	45.7 (1.80)	103.5 (4.07)	219.5 (8.64)	149.9 (5.90)	57.0 (2.24)	31.2 (1.23)	12.4 (0.49)	2.9 (0.11)	659.1 (25.94)
Average precipitation days (≥ 0.1 mm)	1.7	2.4	3.4	4.4	6.7	10.6	14.0	10.4	6.7	4.8	3.2	2.5	70.8
Average snowy days	3.2	2.9	1.3	0.2	0	0	0	0	0	0.1	2.2	3.2	13.1
Average relative humidity (%)	49	45	42	43	49	61	72	73	67	63	58	53	56
Mean monthly sunshine hours	174.6	182.7	227.3	235.7	265.3	223.9	193.4	213.2	215.0	205.0	164.8	164.2	2,465.1
Percentage possible sunshine	58	60	61	59	59	50	43	51	58	60	56	57	56
Source: China Meteorological Administration October all-time Record

== Demographics ==
As of 2017, Zunhua had a population of 794,000, of which, 243,200 resided in urban areas. 114,500 people in Zunhua are ethnic minorities, the largest number in Tangshan.

== Economy ==
Zunhua is home to mineral deposits containing minerals such as iron, manganese, chromium, copper, lead, zinc, gold, and dolomite.

=== Energy ===
141,100 people in Zunhua have access to natural gas, of which, 90,200 have access to LPG.

== Transportation ==
A number of railways and highways pass through the city.

=== Road ===
The following highways pass through Zunhua:

- National Highway 112
- Chengtang Expressway
- Bangkuan Highway
- Zunbao Highway

=== Rail ===
The following railroads pass through Zunhua:

- Daqin Railway
- Tangzun Railway
- Zunxiao Railway

== See also ==
- Eastern Qing Tombs
