= Dingchang =

Qing dynasty politician

- 定長 / 定常

Governor-General of Huguang

Governor of Fujian

Governor of Guizhou

Governor of Shanxi

Governor of Anhui

Right Vice Minister of War

Personal details
- Born: 1705
- Died: 1768 (aged 62–63)
- Relations: Kargišan (father)
- Children: Taibu (eldest son); Taifein (second son)
- Clan: Irgen Gioro
- Posthumous honors: Revoked posthumously

Military service
- Allegiance: Qing dynasty
- Branch/service: Plain Yellow Banner
- Rank: Niru (Company Commander)

Dingchang (Chinese: 定長, also 定常; 1705–1768) was a Qing dynasty official from the Irgen Gioro clan of the Manchu Plain Yellow Banner. He rose to the highest position of Governor-General.

== Biography ==
Dingchang was the eldest son of Kargišan, Governor-General of Min-Zhe(閩浙总督), and entered official service as a Imperial Academy student(監生). He successively served as Secretary of the Grand Secretariat and Imperial Lecture (侍讀). In 1740, he inherited the hereditary nirui janggin held by his family. He subsequently served as Prefect of Xuzhou, Intendant of Huai-Xu, Surveillance Commissioner of Shandong, Provincial Treasurer of Shaanxi, and Governor of Anhui, Guangxi, Shanxi, and Guizhou.

In May 1757, he accompanied the minister Liu Tongxun to Yunnan to investigate accusations that the Governor-General of Yunnan and Guizhou, Hengwen (恒文), had extorted subordinate officials. After the charges were substantiated, the court appointed Dingchang acting Governor-General. The following month, he was transferred to the post of Governor of Shanxi, but before taking office, his father Kargišan died, and he had to observe the customary mourning period. In the eleventh month of the same year, he was granted the rank of Vice Commander (副都統) and ordered to supervise military agricultural colonies in the western army camps. Although officials recommended his dismissal because the personnel he had appointed failed to achieve results, the Qianlong Emperor allowed him to remain in office. He later served as Right Vice Minister of War, Governor of Fujian, and Governor-General of Huguang (湖廣总督). During this period, he was twice recommended for dismissal—first because of a miscarriage of justice involving his subordinates, and later because of the misuse of bamboo carrying baskets during the transport of troops in transit—but on both occasions he was pardoned by the Qianlong Emperor. Dingchang died in 1768. In the following year, when Shi Liang(石亮), Vice Commander of Jingzhou, was impeached as incompetent, the Qianlong Emperor accused Dingchang of having protected him out of favoritism and revoked the posthumous honors previously granted to him.

His eldest son, Taibu, inherited the hereditary rank of baitalabure hafan and served as an Imperial Guard of the Qianqing Gate (乾清門侍衛). His second son, Taifein, served as the Deputy Commander of Shanhaiguan.
