= Imperial and noble ranks of the Qing dynasty =

Qing dynasty imperial bureaucracy ranks

The Qing dynasty (1644–1912) of China developed a complicated peerage system for imperial and noble ranks.

== Rule of inheritance ==
In principle, titles were downgraded one grade for each generation of inheritance.

- Direct imperial princes with the Eight Privileges were downgraded for four generations, after which the title could be inherited without further diminution.
- Direct imperial princes without the Eight Privileges were downgraded until the rank of feng'en jiangjun, which then became perpetual.
- Cadet line imperial princes and lords were downgraded until they reached feng'en jiangjun, which could be further inherited three times before the title expired completely.
- For non-imperial peers, the title could be downgraded to en jiwei before becoming perpetually heritable.

Occasionally, a peer could be granted the privilege of shixi wangti (世襲罔替; shìxí wǎngtì; "perpetual heritability"), which allowed the title to be passed down without downgrading. Throughout the Qing dynasty, there were 12 imperial princely families that had this privilege. They were known as the "iron-cap princes".

The noble titles were inherited through a system of loose primogeniture: the eldest son from the peer's first wife was usually the heir apparent, but inheritance by a younger son, a son of a concubine, or a brother of the peer was not uncommon. According to his birth (by the chief consort, a secondary consort, or a concubine) and his father's rank, a non-heir son of an imperial prince was also entitled to petition for a lower title than the one he would have received had he been the heir. Non-heir sons of other peers were also occasionally granted lower titles.

Whether imperial or not, the inheritance or bestowal was never automatic, and had to be approved by the Emperor, the Ministry of Personnel, or the Imperial Clan Court. Imperial princes, upon reaching adulthood at the age of 20, had to pass tests in horse-riding, archery and the Manchu language before they were eligible for titles. Imperial princesses, other than the Emperor's daughters, were usually granted titles upon marriage, regardless of age. Princesses' titles were also usually fixed after they were granted, and were not affected by changes in their fathers' noble ranks.

== Grading system ==
Yunjiwei ("sub-commander of the cloud cavalry") was originally a military rank created in the Sui dynasty, but it was later turned into a military honour in the Tang dynasty as part of the xun guan (勳官; xūn guān) system. The Qing dynasty abolished the separate military honour system and merged it into the nobility rank system, using yunjiwei as the lowest grantable rank of nobility, and the basic unit of rank progression.

For example, a yunjiwei who received another grant of yunjiwei became a jiduwei. A first-class duke plus yunjiwei was the equivalent of 23 grants of yunjiwei.

=== Official rank (pin) ===
The Qing dynasty, much like previous dynasties, used an "official rank" system (品; pǐn). This system had nine numbered ranks, each subdivided into upper and lower levels, in addition to the lowest "unranked" rank: from upper first pin (正一品), to lower ninth pin (從九品), to the unranked (未入流), for a total of 19 ranks. All government personnel, from the highest chancellors to the lowest clerk, held an official rank ex officio, which determined their salary, uniform, privileges and order of precedence.

This pin system existed in parallel to the noble ranks detailed in this article. Many higher noble titles ranked above this system (超品; chāopǐn). And while some titles corresponded to a pin, they were considered equivalents of convenience rather than actual official ranks.

== Titular names ==
Historically, Chinese noble titles were usually created with a shiyi (食邑; shíyì; fief) each, although the fief could be only nominal. The Hongwu Emperor of the Ming dynasty enfeoffed cadet branch princes and other nobles in different regions of China. The Qing dynasty ended this tradition; with only a few exceptions, no fief was ever named. No Qing prince was enfeoffed with territory. Instead, noble titles were created without a name, or were bestowed a meihao (美號; meǐhào; titular name). These names were usually descriptive of the peer's merit, virtue, or the circumstances leading to his ennoblement. The Dukes Yansheng kept their traditional fief in Shandong under Qing rule.

Titular names were unique for imperial princes, while non-imperial peers' titular names may overlap. Following Ming dynasty tradition, single-character names were reserved for qinwangs, while junwangs used two-character names. All other peers normally had two-character names, but could receive up to four characters.

Since noble titles were primarily awarded for military service, the titular names predominantly described martial virtues, e.g., zhongyong gong (忠勇公; zhōngyǒng gōng; "loyal and brave duke"). However, a particularly common titular name was cheng'en gong (承恩公; chéng'ēn gōng; "duke who receives grace"), which was frequently granted to the Empress's family members.

== Imperial clan ==
=== Eight Privileges ===
At the top of the imperial hierarchy, the highest six ranks enjoyed the "Eight Privileges" (八分; bafen; jakūn ubu). These privileges were:

1. Promotional books inscribed on jade, set of seals for correspondence, red carriage wheels, purple horse reins, right for reported entry, red walls of the residence, use of corner lanterns, use of leopard tail guns.
2. Precious stones on the mandarin hat crests, clothes with encircled dragon patterns, use of imperial porcelain tea sets, purple reins, red wheels, doornails on the gate, employment of guards.
3. Finials on mandarin hats embellished with precious stones, use of two-eyed peacock feather, surcoats with encircled dragon patterns, purple reins, right to enter the imperial palace by horse, leopard tail guns, separate manor in the capital, employment of officials and eunuchs.

Peacock feathers, however, were prohibited for princes above the rank of beizi and direct imperial clansmen. The "Eight Privileges" entitled the prince to participate in state councils and share the spoils of war. However, the prince was also bound to reside in the capital and render service to the imperial court. In 1816, the princes were forbidden from reporting matters via eunuchs. Thus, most of the princes employed officials as managers of domestic affairs. The range of tasks of those officials included conveyance of memorials on behalf of the prince. The supervisor of princely manor held lower fourth rank in the nine pin system.

=== Male members ===
- Heshuo qinwang (ᡥᠣᡧᠣ‍‍ᡳ
  ᠴᡳᠨ ᠸᠠᠩ hošo-i cin wang; 和硕亲王; 和碩親王; héshuò qīnwáng; хошой чин ван), commonly simplified to qinwang, translated as "Prince of the First Rank" or "Prince of the Blood". "Heshuo" ("hošo") means "four corners, four sides" in Manchu.
  - Shizi (世子; Shìzǐ; šidzi), meaning "heir son", refers to the heir apparent to a qinwang.
- Duoluo junwang (ᡩᠣᡵᠣ‍‍ᡳ
  ᡤᡳᠶᡡᠨ ᠸᠠᠩ doro-i giyūn wang; 多罗郡王; 多羅郡王; duōluó jùnwáng; төрийн жүн ван), commonly simplified to junwang, translated as "Prince of the Second Rank" or "Prince of a Commandery".
  - Zhangzi (长子; 長子; zhángzǐ; jangdzi), meaning "eldest son" or "chief son", refers to the heir apparent to a junwang.
- Duoluo beile (ᡩᠣᡵᠣ‍‍ᡳ
  ᠪᡝᡳ᠌ᠯᡝ doro-i beile; 多罗贝勒; 多羅貝勒; duōluó bèilè; Төрийн бэйл), means "lord", "prince" or "chief" in Manchu, commonly simplified to beile, and translated as "Prince of the Third Rank", "Venerable Prince", or "Venerable Lord". "Duoluo" ("doro") means "virtue, courtesy, propriety" in Manchu. It was usually granted to the son of a qinwang or junwang. As beile is the best known Manchu, non-Chinese title, it is commonly used to refer to all Manchu princes.
- Gushan beizi (ᡤᡡᠰᠠ‍‍ᡳ
  ᠪᡝᡳ᠌ᠰᡝ gūsa-i beise; 固山贝子; 固山貝子; gùshān bèizǐ; хошууны бэйс), commonly simplified to beizi, and translated as "Prince of the Fourth Rank", "Banner Prince" or "Banner Lord". "Gushan" ("gūsai") means "banner" in Manchu, a reference to any of the Eight Banners. "Beizi" ("beise") is the plural form of "beile", but since 1636, "beile" and "beizi" were used to refer to two different ranks of nobility.

The four ranks above were granted solely to direct male-line descendants of the Emperor. These titles below were granted to cadet lines of the imperial clan.

- Feng'en zhenguo gong (ᡴᡝᠰᡳ ᠪᡝ
  ᡨᡠᠸᠠᡴᡳᠶᠠᡵᠠ
  ᡤᡠᡵᡠᠨ ᠪᡝ
  ᡩᠠᠯᡳᡵᡝ
  ᡤᡠᠩ kesi-be tuwakiyara gurun-be dalire gung; 奉恩镇国公; 奉恩鎮國公; fèng'ēn zhènguó gōng; Хишгийг сахих улсын түшээ гүн), translated as "Duke Who Receives Grace and Guards the State", simplified to "Duke Who Guards the State", also translated as "Defender Duke by Grace" or "Duke of the First Rank".
- Feng'en fuguo gong (ᡴᡝᠰᡳ ᠪᡝ
  ᡨᡠᠸᠠᡴᡳᠶᠠᡵᠠ
  ᡤᡠᡵᡠᠨ ᡩᡝ
  ᠠᡳᠰᡳᠯᠠᡵᠠ
  ᡤᡠᠩ kesi-be tuwakiyara gurun-de aisilara gung; 奉恩辅国公; 奉恩輔國公; fèng'ēn fǔguó gōng; Хишигийг сахих улсад туслагч гүн), translated as "Duke Who Receives Grace and Assists the State", simplified to "Duke Who Assists the State", also translated as "Bulwark Duke by Grace" or "Duke of the Second Rank".

The above six ranks are titles that enjoy the "Eight Privileges". The titles below do not enjoy the "Eight Privileges" and have no imperial duties.

- Burubafen zhenguo gong (ᠵᠠᡴᡡᠨ
  ᡠᠪᡠ ᡩᡝ
  ᡩᠣᠰᡳᠮᠪᡠᡥᠠᡴᡡ
  ᡤᡠᡵᡠᠨ ᠪᡝ
  ᡩᠠᠯᡳᡵᡝ
  ᡤᡠᠩ jakūn ubu-de dosimbuhakū gurun-be dalire gung; 不入八分镇国公; 不入八分鎮國公; bùrùbāfēn zhènguó gōng; Найман хувьд оруулсангүй улсын түшээ гүн), translated as "Duke Without the Eight Privileges Who Guards the State", also translated as "Lesser Defender Duke" or "Duke of the Third Rank".
- Burubafen fuguo gong (ᠵᠠᡴᡡᠨ
  ᡠᠪᡠ ᡩᡝ
  ᡩᠣᠰᡳᠮᠪᡠᡥᠠᡴᡡ
  ᡤᡠᡵᡠᠨ ᠪᡝ
  ᠠᡳᠰᡳᠯᠠᡵᠠ
  ᡤᡠᠩ jakūn ubu-de dosimbuhakū gurun-be aisilara gung; 不入八分辅国公; 不入八分輔國公; bùrùbāfēn fǔguó gōng; Найман хувьд оруулсангүй улсад туслагч гүн), translated as "Duke Without the Eight Privileges Who Assists the State", also translated as "Lesser Bulwark Duke" or "Duke of the Fourth Rank".

All of the above titles are chaopin (超品; chāopǐn), outranking official ranks. The ranks below are ranked first to fourth pin respectively. The first three jiangjun ranks are each further subdivided into four classes: first class plus yunjiwei, first class, second class, and third class.

- Zhenguo jiangjun (ᡤᡠᡵᡠᠨ ᠪᡝ
  ᡩᠠᠯᡳᡵᡝ
  ᠵᠠᠩᡤᡳᠨ; gurun be dalire janggin; 镇国将军; 鎮國將軍; zhènguó jiāngjūn; улсыг сахих жанжин), translated as "General Who Guards the State", "Defender General", or "(Hereditary) General of the First Rank".
- Fuguo jiangjun (ᡤᡠᡵᡠᠨ ᡩᡝ
  ᠠᡳᠰᡳᠯᠠᡵᠠ
  ᠵᠠᠩᡤᡳᠨ; gurun de aisilara janggin; 辅国将军; 輔國將軍; fǔguó jiāngjūn; туслагч жанжин), translated as "General Who Assists the State", "Bulwark General", or "(Hereditary) General of the Second Rank".
- Fengguo jiangjun (ᡤᡠᡵᡠᠨ ᠪᡝ
  ᡨᡠᠸᠠᡴᡳᠶᠠᡵᠠ
  ᠵᠠᠩᡤᡳᠨ; gurun be tuwakiyara janggin; 奉国将军; 奉國將軍; fèngguó jiāngjūn), translated as "General Who Receives the State", "Supporter General", or "(Hereditary) General of the Third Rank".
- Feng'en jiangjun (ᡴᡝᠰᡳ ᠪᡝ
  ᡨᡠᠸᠠᡴᡳᠶᠠᡵᠠ
  ᠵᠠᠩᡤᡳᠨ; kesi-be tuwakiyara janggin; 奉恩将军; 奉恩將軍; fèng'ēn jiāngjūn), translated as "General Who Receives Grace", "General by Grace", or "(Hereditary) General of the Fourth Rank". This rank has no sub-classes. This title is not granted per se, but were given to heirs of fengguo jiangjuns.

Regardless of title and rank, an imperial prince was addressed as "A-ge" (ᠠᡤᡝ; age; 阿哥; À-gē), which means "lord" or "commander" in Manchu.

==== Comparison of imperial titles for male members ====
Title	Title equivalent	Title of vassal state	Class	Subclass
Emperor			Above ranks	None
Crown Prince			Above ranks	None
		Khan	Above ranks	None
Prince of the First Rank			Above ranks	None
Prince of the Second Rank	Shizi		Above ranks	None
Prince of the Third Rank	Zhangzi		Above ranks	None
Prince of the Fourth Rank	Prince Consort of the First Rank		Above ranks	None
Duke of the First Rank	Prince Consort of the Second Rank		Above ranks	None
Duke of the Second Rank	Prince Consort of the Second Rank		Above ranks	None
Duke of the Third Rank	Prince Consort of the Second Rank	Jasagh Taiji/Tabunang	Above ranks	None
Duke of the Fourth Rank	Prince Consort of the Second Rank	Jasagh Taiji/Tabunang	Above ranks	None
General of the First Rank		Taiji/Tabunang	1	1–3
General of the Second Rank		Taiji/Tabunang	2	1–3
General of the Third Rank		Taiji/Tabunang	3	1–3
General of the Fourth Rank		Taiji/Tabunang	4	1–3

=== Female members ===
The following titles were granted to female members of the imperial clan:

- Gulun gongzhu (固伦公主; 固倫公主; gùlún gōngzhǔ; ᡤᡠᡵᡠᠨ ‍ᡳ
  ᡤᡠᠩᠵᡠ gurun-i gungju), translated as "Princess of the Empire" or "Princess of the First Rank". It was usually granted to a princess born to the empress. "Gulun" means "all under Heaven" in Manchu.
- Heshuo gongzhu (和硕公主; 和碩公主; héshuò gōngzhǔ; ᡥᠣᡧᠣᡳ
  ᡤᡠᠩᠵᡠ hošo-i gungju), translated as "Princess of the State" or "Princess of the Second Rank". It was usually granted to a princess born to a consort. "Heshuo" ("hošo") means "four corners, four sides" in Manchu.
- Junzhu (郡主; jùnzhǔ; ᡥᠣᡧᠣᡳ
  ᡤᡝᡤᡝ hošo-i gege), translated as "Princess of a Commandery" or "Princess of the Third Rank". It was usually granted to the daughter of a qinwang. Also called heshuo gege (和碩格格) or qinwang gege (親王格格). Daughters of qinwang also could be promoted to heshuo gongzhu or gulun gongzhu if they were adopted by the emperor.
- Xianzhu (县主; 縣主; xiànzhǔ; ᡩᠣᡵᠣ‍‍ᡳ
  ᡤᡝᡤᡝ doro-i gege), translated as "Princess of a County" or "Princess of the Fourth Rank". It was usually granted to the daughter of a junwang or shizi. Also called duolun gege (多倫格格) or junwang gege (郡王格格).
- Junjun (郡君; jùnjūn; ᠪᡝᡳᠯᡝᡳ
  ᠵᡠᡳ
  ᡩᠣᡵᠣᡳ
  ᡤᡝᡤᡝ beile-i jui doro-i gege), translated as "Lady of a Commandery" or "Lady of the First Rank". It was usually granted to a daughter born to a secondary consort of a qinwang or to the daughter of a beile. Also called duolun gege (多倫格格) or beile gege (貝勒格格).
- Xianjun (县君; 縣君; xiànjūn; ᡤᡡᠰᠠᡳ
  ᡤᡝᡤᡝ gūsa-i gege), translated as "Lady of a County" or "Lady of the Second Rank". It was usually granted to a daughter born to a secondary consort of a junwang or to the daughter of a beizi. Also called gushan gege (固山格格) or beizi gege (貝子格格).
- Xiangjun (乡君; 鄉君; xiãngjũn; ᡤᡠᠩ ᠨᡳ
  ᠵᡠᡳ
  ᡤᡝᡤᡝ gung-ni jui gege), translated as "Lady of a Township" or "Lady of the Third Rank". It was usually granted to the daughters of dukes with eight privileges or daughters born to a secondary consort of beile. Also called gong gege (公格格).
- Zongnü (宗女; zõngnǚ), translated as "Clanswoman". This is not a granted title, but the honorific given to all daughters of dukes without eight privileges and jiangjuns, as well as all other untitled princesses. However,
  - Daughters born to a secondary consort of a beizi were called wupinfeng zongnü (五品俸宗女), "clanswoman with stipend of the fifth pin".
  - Daughters born to a secondary consort of a feng'en zhenguo gong or feng'en fuguo gong are called liupinfeng zongnü (六品俸宗女), "clanswoman with stipend of the sixth pin".

==== Comparison of imperial titles for female members ====
Title	Father		Rank
Title	Mother being primary consort	Mother being secondary consort	Rank
Princess of the First Rank	Emperor		Above the ranks
Princess of the Second Rank		Emperor	Above the ranks
Princess of the Third Rank	Crown Prince/Prince of the First Rank		Above the ranks
Princess of the Fourth Rank	Prince of the Second Rank/Shizi		Above the ranks
Lady of the First Rank	Prince of the Third Rank/Zhangzi	Prince of the First Rank	Above the ranks
Lady of the Second Rank	Prince of the Fourth Rank	Prince of the Second Rank	Above the ranks
Lady of the Third Rank	Duke with the eight privileges	Prince of the Third Rank	Above the ranks
Clanswoman	Duke without the eight privileges	Prince of the Fourth Rank	5
Clanswoman	General	Duke with the eight privileges	6
Clanswoman		Duke without the eight privileges	7
Clanswoman		General	8

=== Princes consort ===
Efu (ᡝᡶᡠ 额驸; 額駙; éfù), also known Fuma (驸马; 駙馬; fùmǎ), translated as "Prince Consort". Its original meaning was "emperor's charioteer". It was usually granted to the spouse of an imperial woman above the rank of zongnü. The efus were separated into seven ranks corresponding to the rank of the princesses the efu married. Efus who married gulun gongzhus and heshuo gongzhus held ranks equivalent to the beizis and dukes respectively. The remaining efus had equivalent official rank from the first to fifth pin.

An efu retained his title and privileges as long as the princess remained his primary consort – even after her death. However, if an efu remarried or promoted another consort to be his primary consort, he would lose all rights obtained from his marriage to the princess.

=== Princesses consort ===
The following titles were granted to consorts of imperial princes:

- Primary consort (嫡福晋, dí fújìn) also called great consort (大福晋, dà fújìn; ᠠᠮᠪᠠ
  ᡶᡠᠵᡳᠨ amba fujin), was given to the main wives of imperial princes above the rank of junwang. Other main wives were titled "madame" (夫人, fūrén). The main spouse of the crown prince was given the title "crown princess" (皇太子妃; huáng tàizǐ fēi). Primary consorts of the emperor's sons could also be entitled "imperial princess consort" (皇子妃; huángzǐ fēi). The title "crown princess" was equivalent to imperial noble consort, while "imperial princess consort" was equivalent to noble consort. The title "great consort" was granted to wives of Nurhaci and Hong Taiji. Primary consorts were selected through receiving a ruyi scepter.
- Secondary consort (側福晉; cè fújìn; ᠠᠰᡥᠠᠨ ᡳ
  ᡶᡠᠵᡳᠨ ashan-i-fujin) was granted to secondary wives of imperial princes above the ranks of junwang. Secondary wives of the crown prince were given the title "crown prince's secondary consort" (皇太子侧妃; huáng tàizǐ cè fēi). Secondary wives of the emperor's sons could also be titled "imperial secondary consort" (皇子侧妃; huángzǐ cè fēi). Secondary consorts were selected by receiving an embroidered sachet.
- Mistress (格格, gégé), little consort (小福晋, xiǎo fújìn; ᠠᠵᡳᡤᡝ
  ᡶᡠᠵᡳᠨ ajige-i-fujin), concubine (妾, qiè), or lesser consort (庶福晋, shù fújìn) was granted to concubines of imperial princes, dukes and generals. Mistresses were selected by receiving 100 taels.

If a primary consort was divorced or died, the next primary consort held the title of "step consort" (继福晋, jì fújìn).

Dead princesses consort of the emperor could be posthumously honoured as empress, ex. Lady Niohuru, first wife of Minning, was honoured as Empress Xiaomucheng, and Lady Sakda, first wife of Yizhu, was honoured as Empress Xiaodexian.

All princesses consort regardless of rank were listed in the imperial genealogy (jade tables).

==== Comparison of imperial titles for consorts ====
Imperial consort	Imperial princess consort	Imperial clanswomen rank	Imperial Princess
Empress		Above the ranks	
Imperial Noble Consort	Crown Princess	Above the ranks	Princess Imperial
Noble Consort	Primary Consort of the First Rank	Above the ranks	Princess of the First Rank
Consort	Primary Consort of a Shizi	Above the ranks	Princess of the Second Rank
	Primary Consort of the Second Rank	Above the ranks	Princess of the Third Rank
Concubine	Primary Consort of the Third Rank	Above the ranks	Princess of the Fourth Rank
Noble Lady	Primary Consort of the Fourth Rank	Above the ranks	Lady of the First Rank
First Class Attendant	Duchess with the eight privileges	Above the ranks	Lady of the Second Rank
Second Class Attendant	Duchess without the eight privileges	Above the ranks	Lady of the Third Rank
	Wife of imperial general	1 to 6	Clanswoman

=== Others ===
At the beginning of the Qing dynasty, before the rank system was formalised, non-standard titles were also used, such as:

- Da beile (大贝勒; 大貝勒; dà bèilè; ᠠᠮᠪᠠ
  ᠪᡝᡳ᠌ᠯᡝ amba beile), translated as "Great Beile", assumed by Daišan during the tetrarchy, and by Hong Taiji prior to his ascension.
- Zhang gongzhu (长公主; 長公主), translated as "Grand Princess", "Chief Princess", "Eldest Princess" or "Princess Imperial", was granted to various daughters of Nurhaci and Hong Taiji. The title could be granted to the eldest daughter of the emperor or the emperor's sisters.
- Da zhang gongzhu (大长公主), translated as "Princess Supreme", could be granted to the emperor's paternal aunt. The only holder of this title was Princess Yongmu, fourth daughter of Hong Taiji by Empress Xiaozhuangwen, and aunt of the Kangxi Emperor.

== Non-imperial nobility ==
=== Standard non-imperial titles ===
The following are the nine ranks of the peerage awarded for valour, achievement, distinction, other imperial favour, and to imperial consort clans.

- Gong (公; gōng; 'duke'; ᡤᡠᠩ gung), often referred to as min gong (民公; mín gōng; "commoner duke") to differentiate from the imperial guo gong (國公; guó gōng; "imperial duke"). Translated as "Duke" or "Non-imperial Duke". The title jun gong (郡公; jùn gōng; "commandery duke") existed from around the Cao Wei period until the early years of the Ming dynasty, along with xian gong (縣公; xiàn gōng; "county duke").
- Hou (侯; hóu; ᡥᠣ ho), translated as "Marquis" or "Marquess".
- Bo (伯; bó; ᠪᡝ be), translated as "Count".

The above three ranks are chaopin (超品; chāopǐn), outranking official ranks. The four following ranks were all evolved from leadership ranks in the Manchu banner army, originally called ᡝᠵᡝᠨ ejen (額真; "lord" or "master" in Manchu) and later ᠵᠠᠩᡤᡳᠨ janggin (章京; "general" in Manchu).

- Zi (子; zǐ; ᠵᡳᠩᡴᡳᠨᡳ
  ᡥᠠᡶᠠᠨ jinkini hafan), translated as "Viscount".
- Nan (男; nán; ᠠᠰᡥᠠᠨ ᡳ
  ᡥᠠᡶᠠᠨ ashan i hafan), translated as "Baron".
- Qingche duwei (轻车都尉; 輕車都尉; qīngchē dūwèi; ᠠᡩᠠᡥᠠ
  ᡥᠠᡶᠠᠨ adaha hafan), translated as "Master Commandant of Light Chariot", roughly equivalent to a Knight Grand Commander.

All of the above ranks are sub-divided into four classes; in order: first class plus yunqiwei, first class, second class, and third class.

- Jiduwei (骑都尉; 騎都尉; jídūwèi; ᠪᠠᡳᡨᠠᠯᠠᠪᡠᡵᡝ
  ᡥᠠᡶᠠᠨ baitalabure hafan), translated as "Master Commandant of Cavalry", rough equivalent of a Knight Commander. This rank is subdivided into two classes: jiduwei plus yunjiwei, and simply jiduwei.
- Yunqiwei (云骑尉; 雲騎尉; yúnjíwèi; ᡨᡠᠸᠠᡧᠠᡵᠠ
  ᡥᠠᡶᠠᠨ tuwašara hafan), translated as "Knight Commandant of the Cloud", rough equivalent of a Knight Baronet or a German Hereditary Knight (Ritter).
- Enjiwei (恩骑尉; 恩騎尉; ēnjíwèi; ᡴᡝᠰᡳᠩᡤᡝ
  ᡥᠠᡶᠠᠨ kesingge hafan), translated as "Knight Commandant by Grace", rough equivalent of an Knight Bachelor. This title was not granted per se, but bestowed on the heirs of yunjiweis without the privilege of perpetual inheritance.

== Pre-standard non-imperial titles ==
At the beginning of the Qing dynasty, during Nurhaci's and Huangtaiji's reigns, the noble ranks were not yet standardised. Several titles were created that did not fit into the above system, mostly for defectors from the Ming dynasty. These titles were similar to the titles used in the Ming dynasty, and lack the Manchu nomenclature and the noble rank system introduced later.

- Qinwang (亲王; 親王; qīnwáng; ᠴᡳᠨ ᠸᠠᠩ cin wang; чин ван), "Prince of the Blood", created for Wu Sangui and Shang Kexi.
- Junwang (郡王; jùnwáng; ᡤᡳᠶᡡᠨ ᠸᠠᠩ giyūn wang; жүн ван), "Prince of a Commandery", created for Fuhuan and Fukang'an.
- Wang (王; wáng; ᠸᠠᠩwang; ван), "Prince", created for Yangguli and several Ming defectors. The relation between wang and junwang is unclear: in both Ming and Qing traditions, single-character titular names were reserved for qinwangs, while junwangs received two-character titular names, but these wangs were created with both single and two-character titular names. Both Wu Sangui and Shang Kexi were promoted from wang to qinwang, but no wang was ever promoted to junwang or vice versa.
- Beile (贝勒; 貝勒; bèilè; ᠪᡝᡳ᠌ᠯᡝ beile; бэйл), "Lord", "Prince" or "Chief" in Manchu. It was the generic title of all Manchu lords during the Ming dynasty. Under the Qing dynasty, this title was generally reserved for imperials, but was retained by the princes of Yehe after their submission to Nurhaci.
- Beizi (贝子; 貝子; bèizǐ; ᠪᡝᡳ᠌ᠰᡝ beise; бэйс). Normally reserved for imperials, it was uniquely created for Fukang'an, before he was further elevated to junwang.
- Chaopin Gong (超品公; chāopǐngōng; 'duke above ranks'), "High Duke", a unique rank created for Yangguli, before he was further elevated to wang. This title ranks just below beizi and above all other dukes.
- Gong (公; gōng; ᡤᡠᠩ Gung; гүн; "Duke"), Hou (侯; hóu; ᡥᠣ ho; "Marquess"), and Bo (伯; bó; ᠪᡝ be; "Count"), similar to the later standard titles, but created without subclasses (不言等; bùyándeng).

Additionally, there were banner offices that later evolved into hereditary noble titles. Despite being used as noble titles, these offices continued to exist and function in the banner hierarchy. To distinguish the noble titles from the offices, they were sometimes called "hereditary office" (世职; 世職; shì zhí) or "hereditary rank" (世爵; shì jué).

- Gūsa-i ejen ᡤᡡᠰᠠ‍‍ᡳ ᡳ
  ᡝᠵᡝᠨ (固山额真; 固山額真; gùshān é'zhēn, meaning "master of a banner", later Sinicised to become dutong (都統; dūtǒng), meaning "colonel";
  - Evolved into zongbing (总兵; 總兵; zǒngbīng), meaning "chief commander";
  - Then into amba janggin ᠠᠮᠪᠠ
    ᠵᠠᠩᡤᡳᠨ (昂邦章京/按班章京; ángbāng zhāngjīng/ànbān zhāngjīng), (Mongolian: Их занги), meaning "grand general";
  - Then into jinkini hafan ᠵᡳᠩᡴᡳᠨᡳ
    ᡥᠠᡶᠠᠨ (精奇尼哈番; jīngqíní hāfān), meaning "prime officer";
  - Which was finally Sinicised to become zi (子; zǐ), meaning "viscount".
- Meiren-i ejen ᠮᡝᡳᡵᡝᠨ ᡳ
  ᡝᠵᡝᠨ (梅勒额真/美淩額真; 梅勒額真/美凌額真; méilè é'zhēn/měilíng é'zhēn, meaning "vice master", Sinicised to become fu dutong (副都统; fù dūtǒng), meaning "vice colonel";
  - Evolved into fujiang (副将; 副將; fùjiàng), meaning "vice general";
  - Then into meiren-i janggin ᠮᡝᡳᡵᡝᠨ ᡳ
    ᠵᠠᠩᡤᡳᠨ (梅勒章京; méilè zhāngjīng), (Mongolian: Мэйрэний занги), meaning "vice general";
  - Then into ashan-i hafan ᠠᠰᡥᠠᠨ ᡳ
    ᡥᠠᡶᠠᠨ (阿思尼哈番; ā'sīní hāfān), meaning "vice officer";
  - Which was finally Sinicised to become nan (男; nán), meaning "baron".
- Jalan-i ejen ᠵᠠᠯᠠᠨ ᡳ
  ᡝᠵᡝᠨ (甲喇额真; 甲喇額真; jiǎlā é'zhēn, meaning "master of a sub-banner", Sinicised to become canling (参领; 參領; cānlǐng), meaning "staff captain";
  - Evolved into canjiang (参将; 參將; cānjiàng), meaning "staff general", or youji (游击; 游擊; yóujī), meaning "vanguard" or "skirmish leader";
  - Then into jalan-i janggin ᠵᠠᠯᠠᠨ ᡳ
    ᠵᠠᠩᡤᡳᠨ (扎兰章京; 扎蘭章京; zhālán zhāngjīng), (Mongolian:Залангийн занги), meaning "general of a sub-banner";
  - Then into adaha hafan ᠠᡩᠠᡥᠠ
    ᡥᠠᡶᠠᠨ (阿达哈哈番; 阿達哈哈番; ā'dáhā hāfān), meaning "chariot officer";
  - Which was finally Sinicised to become qingche duwei (轻车都尉; 輕車都尉; qīngchē dūweì), meaning "master commandant of light chariot".
- Niru-i ejen ᠨᡳᡵᡠᡳ
  ᡝᠵᡝᠨ (牛录额真; 牛錄額真; niúlù é'zhēn, meaning "master of an arrow" (an "arrow" was a basic unit of a banner army), later Sinicised to become zuoling (佐领; 佐領; zuólǐng), meaning "assistant captain";
  - Evolved into beiyu (备御; 備御; bèiyù), meaning "rearguard";
  - Then into niru-i janggin ᠨᡳᡵᡠᡳ
    ᠵᠠᠩᡤᡳᠨ (牛录章京; 牛錄章京; niúlù zhāngjīng), (Mongolian:Сумын занги), meaning "general of an arrow";
  - Then into baitalabura hafan ᠪᠠᡳᡨᠠᠯᠠᠪᡠᡵᡝ
    ᡥᠠᡶᠠᠨ (拜他喇布勒哈番; bàitālābùlè hāfān), meaning "adjutant officer";
  - Which was finally Sinicised to become ji duwei (骑都尉; 騎都尉; jì dūweì), meaning "master commandant of cavalry".

=== Comparison of non-imperial nobility titles ===
Nobility title	Class	Rank	Military official rank equivalent
Duke (民公)	1	Above ranks	
Duke (民公)	2	Above ranks	
Duke (民公)	3	Above ranks	
Marquis (侯)	1	Above ranks	
Marquis (侯)	2	Above ranks	
Marquis (侯)	3	Above ranks	
Count (伯)	1	Above ranks	
Count (伯)	2	Above ranks	
Count (伯)	3	Above ranks	
Viscount (子)	1	1	General (駐防將軍)
Viscount (子)	2	1	Colonel (都統)
Viscount (子)	3	1	Minister of War (兵部尚書)
Baron (男)	1	2	Vice-colonel (副都统)
Baron (男)	2	2	Commander of the garrison(總兵)
Baron (男)	3	2	Fujiang (副将)
Qingche duwei (輕車都尉)	1	3	Staff-captain (參領)
Qingche duwei (輕車都尉)	2	3	Hunting grounds supervisor in Rehe (熱河圍場总管)
Qingche duwei (輕車都尉)	3	3	Minister of Imperial Stables (上匹院卿)
Jiduwei (骑都尉; 騎都尉; jídūwèi)	1	4	Assistant captain (左领)
Jiduwei (骑都尉; 騎都尉; jídūwèi)	2	4	Leader of imperial bodyguards (侍卫班领)
Yunjiwei (云骑尉; 雲騎尉; yúnjíwèi)	1	5	Fifth rank controller of Amur river transport (黑龙江水手管)
Enjiwei (恩骑尉; 恩騎尉; ēnjíwèi)	1	6	Supervisor of imperial tombs (陵园管)

=== Notable titles ===
- Duke Yansheng (衍圣公; 衍聖公; Yǎnshèng Gōng; "Duke Overflowing with Sagacity), granted to the heirs of the senior northern branch of Confucius in Qufu.
- Duke Hanjun (漢軍公; Hànjūn Gōng; "Duke of Han-martial"), granted to Ming loyalist Zheng Keshuang, the once independent king of the Taiwan-based Kingdom of Tungning who surrendered to the Qing Empire in 1683, and his heirs.
- Duke Cheng'en (承恩公, Chéng‘ēn Gōng, "Duke Who Receives Grace"), granted to fathers and brothers of empresses. This title had 3 subclasses.
- First Class Duke Zhongyong (一等忠勇公,Yīděng Zhōngyǒng Gōng, "Duke of Loyalty and Courage"), granted to Fuca Fuheng for Xinjiang campaign.
- Count Zhongcheng (忠誠伯; Zhōngchéng Bó; "Count of Loyalty and Sincerity"), granted to Feng Xifan, a former Ming loyalist official in the Kingdom of Tungning.
- Marquis Jinghai (靖海侯; Jìnghǎi Hóu; "Marquis Pacifying the Sea"), granted to Shi Lang and his heirs.
- Hereditary Magistrate of Guogan County (世袭果敢县令; 世襲果敢縣令; shìxí Guógǎn xiànlìng), granted to Ming loyalist Yang Guohua (楊國華/杨国华), the ruler of the Kokang region in present-day Myanmar.
- Marquis Yan'en (延恩侯; Yán'ēn Hóu; "Marquis of Extended Grace"), granted to the heads of a cadet branch of the House of Zhu, the imperial clan of the Ming dynasty.
- Count Zhaoxin (昭信伯; Zhāoxìn Bó), granted to Li Shiyao (李侍堯), a descendant of Li Yongfang (李永芳).
- First Class Marquis Yiyong (一等毅勇侯; Yīděng Yìyǒng Hóu； “Marquis of Determination and Courage"), granted to Zeng Guofan and his descendants.
- Second Class Marquis Kejing (二等恪靖侯; Èrděng Kèjìng Hóu; "Marquis of Respect and Tranquility" ), granted to Zuo Zongtang and his descendants.
- First Class Marquis Suyi (一等肅毅侯; Yīděng Sùyì Hóu; ”Marquis of Peace and Determination"), granted to Li Hongzhang and his descendants.

=== Non-imperial nobility titles for women ===
Mingfu (命妇; mìngfù; "noblewoman") was granted to wives of officials, non-imperial aristocrats and collateral clanswomen. Also, mothers of imperial consorts were granted a title of "mingfu" according to the rank held by her daughter as well as sisters of imperial consorts and fujins. Noblewomen were divided into 7 ranks according to the rank of her husband and her daughter, if her daughter was an imperial consort. If the title held by mingfus' husbands was divided into subclasses, they could be treated equally. Mingfus holding rank equivalent to wives of imperial generals conducted court ceremonies, ex. promotions of imperial consort, weddings of princes and princesses (if they married into Manchu or Han family) and rites, while lower rank ladies attended to them.

Mingfu, whose husband was granted a title above the rank system (Duke, Marquis or Count), was treated similarly to imperial duchess, but enjoyed fewer privileges than imperial clanswoman. Collateral Gioro ladies were treated as mingfu from 1st to 3rd rank. Noblewomen were addressed as "furen" ("Madam") regardless of rank.

However，

- Wives of officials who received nobility title, were ranked according to the rank held by their husbands and could be further promoted. Sometimes, mingfus were given honorifical names, ex. Tatara Meixian, primary spouse of Niohuru Lingzhu, was styled as "Madam of Gaoming" by Kangxi Emperor personally.
- Sisters of imperial consorts, who weren't members of imperial family (primary consorts or imperial consorts) were given a title of mingfu and receive a title according to the position of their husbands.
- Mingfu retained her title even after divorce if her sister or daughter was imperial consort.
- Wives and mothers of dukes and aristocrats, who received pre-standard titles could be addressed as "fujin" – a title typical for imperial princess consort. For example, mother of Fuk'anggan, Lady Yehe Nara was mentioned and addressed as "fujin", as a mother of Prince Jiayong of the Second Rank (嘉勇郡王). Fukang'an's wife, Lady Irgen Gioro was also addressed as "fujin". Their names were not listed in Jade Tables.
- Close friends and servants of imperial consorts who weren't members of ruling clan could receive a title of mingfu and rarely could be addressed as "gege". Although Sumalagu, a confidant of Empress Dowager Xiaozhuang, was entitled as mingfu, grand empress dowager Xiaozhuang addressed her as "gege" (imperial princess).

Differently to imperial clanswomen, mingfus wore crowns with three bejeweled plaques and finial consisting of one coral, silk bandeaus with embroidered golden dragons chasing after a flaming pearl and blue-grounded chaofu on solemn ceremonies. Lower-ranking ladies could not wear surcoats with roundels of flowers and auspicious symbols unlike imperial duchesses and clanswomen. Collateral clanswomen could wear surcoats with rampant four-clawed dragons above the magnificent sea-waves pattern (lishui) and white caishui (pointed kerchief fastened to the robe like a pendant). Wives of officials wore sleeveless vest matching Mandarin square of her husband and Ming Dynasty style tiaras, as depicted on ancestral portraits.

Comparison of titles of noblewomen
Rank	Title	Title of imperial consort being a daughter of noblewoman	Imperial title equivalent
1	Viscountess	Empress/Empress Dowager	Wife of zhenguo jiangjun
2	Baroness	Imperial Noble Consort	Wife of fuguo jiangjun
3	Wife of qingche duwei	Noble Consort	Wife of fengguo jiangjun
4	Wife of jiduwei	Consort	Wife of feng'en jiangjun
5	Wife of yunjiwei	Imperial Concubine	Clanswoman
6	Wife of enjiwei	Noble Lady	Clanswoman
7	Wife of 7th rank official	First Attendant / Second Attendant	

== Civil and honorary titles ==
With a few exceptions, the above titles were, in principle, created for only military merits. There were also titles for civil officials.

While there were a few Manchu civil titles, the most important civil titles followed the Han Chinese Confucian tradition, derived from high bureaucratic offices or imperial household offices that evolved into honorary sinecures. These were sometimes granted as special privileges, but also often as a practical means of conferring official rank promotion without giving specific responsibilities. Examples of such titles were taibao (太保; "Grand Protector"), shaoshi (少師; "Junior Preceptor"), taizi taifu (太子太傅; "Grand Tutor of the Crown Prince"), furen (夫人, "Madam"/“Lady") and dafu (大夫; "Gentleman"). These titles were non-heritable.

In addition, there were also honorary and hereditary titles granted to religious and cultural leaders, such as:

- Wujing Boshi (五经博士; 五經博士; Wǔjīng Bóshì; 'Professor of the Five Classics'), a title used in the Hanlin Academy. It was awarded the southern branch of Confucius's descendants in Quzhou, and Mencius's descendants in Zoucheng, as well as descendants of Confucian sages (e.g. Confucius's disciples and prominent Neo-Confucian scholars), and descendants of Guan Yu and the Duke of Zhou. There were 22 of them. Zhang Zai's descendants received the "Wujing Boshi" appointment along with those of Zhu Xi, Cheng Hao, Cheng Yi and Zhou Dunyi.
- Zhengyi Si Jiao Zhenren (正一嗣教真人; 正一嗣教眞人; Zhèngyī Sì Jiào Zhēnrén), an honorary title awarded to Zhang Daoling's descendants and the Celestial Masters.

== Ranks of protectorates and tributary states ==
The Qing imperial court also granted titles to princes of its protectorates and tributary states, mainly in Mongolia, Xinjiang and Tibet. The vassal titles were generally inherited in perpetuity without downgrading.

The ranks roughly mirrored those of the imperial clan, with a few differences:

- Han (汗; hàn; 'Khan'; han), ranked higher than qinwang, and ranked only below the Emperor and the Crown Prince in the Qing hierarchy. Sometimes also called hanwang (汗王; hánwáng; "Khan-King"). The Emperor also used the title of dahan (大汗; dàhán; "Great Khan") instead of Emperor in communiqués to the Central Asian states.
- Vassal princes who did not have the "Eight Privileges". There were no distinctions between dukes with or without the "Eight Privileges". There were only two ducal ranks: zhenguo gong and fuguo gong.
- Instead of the jiangjun ranks, the vassal lords held these titles:
  - Taiji (台吉; 臺吉; táijí; tayiji), for members of the Borjigin clan.
  - Tabunang (塔布囊; tābùnáng; tabunang), for descendants of Jelme.

The taiji and tabunang are equal in rank, and both subdivided into five classes: jasagh, first class, second class, third class, and fourth class. Jasagh is chaopin, above official ranks, while the rest were equivalent to the first to fourth pin.

Under the tusi system, the Qing Empire also recognised various local tribal chieftainships of ethnic minority tribes. This was mainly applied in the mountain regions of Yunnan, but also in western and northern borderlands. They were the Chiefdom of Bathang, Chiefdom of Chuchen, Chiefdom of Lijiang, Chiefdom of Lithang, Chiefdom of Mangshi, Chiefdom of Tsanlha, Chiefdom of Yao'an, Chiefdom of Yongning, Mu'ege Chiefdom of Muli and Chiefdom of Langqu.

The Qing Empire had two vassals in Xinjiang, the Kumul Khanate and the Turfan Khanate.

== Modernized awards/orders system ==
The modernized awards system, promulgated in 1882, was as follows in the following order (from highest to lowest):

- Order of the Peacock Feather
- Order of the Blue Feather
- Order of the Double Dragon
- Order of the Imperial Throne
- Order of the Yellow Dragon
- Order of the Red Dragon
- Order of the Blue Dragon
- Order of the Black Dragon

In 1909, a scheme of nobility insignia were proposed, used only with 1905/1911 military uniforms. These insignia consist of a center in Or, top in Sable, red bottom in Gules, dexter in Argent and sinister in Azul or Vert.

Rank	Edge	Floral	Center Gem	Surrounding Gems	Number
King of Blood	Gold	Firmiana simplex	Ruby	Pearl	10 (3+2+3+2)
King of Commandary	Gold	Firmiana simplex	Ruby	Pearl	8 (2+2+2+2)
Prince	Gold	Firmiana simplex	Ruby	Pearl	7 (3+1+2+1)
Prince of Banner	Gold	Firmiana simplex	Ruby	Pearl	6 (2+1+2+1)
Prince Consort of the Empire	Gold	Paeonia suffruticosa	Ruby	Pearl	6 (2+1+2+1)
Defender Duke	Gold	Firmiana simplex	Ruby	Pearl	5 (2+1+1+1)
Bulwark Duke	Gold	Firmiana simplex	Ruby	Pearl	4 (1+1+1+1)
Lesser Defender Duke	Gold	Firmiana simplex	Red Coral	Pearl	5 (2+1+1+1)
Lesser Bulwark Duke	Gold	Firmiana simplex	Red Coral	Pearl	4 (1+1+1+1)
Prince Consort of the States	Gold	Paeonia suffruticosa	Red Coral	Pearl	4 (1+1+1+1)
Defender General	Gold	Firmiana simplex	Red Coral	Pearl	1 (top)
Bulwark General	Gold	Firmiana simplex	Red Coral	Ruby	1 (top)
Supporter General	Gold	Firmiana simplex	Sapphire	Red Coral	1 (top)
General by Grace	Gold	Firmiana simplex	Lapis lazuli	Sapphire	1 (top)
Duke	Silver	Paeonia suffruticosa	Red Coral	Pearl	4 (1+1+1+1)
Marquess	Silver	Paeonia suffruticosa	Red Coral	Pearl	3 (1+1+0+1)
Count	Silver	Paeonia suffruticosa	Red Coral	Pearl	2 (1+0+1+0)
Viscount	Silver	Paeonia suffruticosa	Red Coral	Pearl	1 (top)
Baron	Silver	Paeonia suffruticosa	Red Coral	Ruby	1 (top)

Vassal nobilities replace Gold edging and F. simplex with silver edging and P. suffruticosa from the insinia of the matching rank of royals.

== Other honours and privileges ==
In addition to systematized rank titles listed above, there were also other honorific titles and privileges, mostly non-heritable:

- There were various Mongol/Manchu/Turkic titles, granted mainly to non-Han vassals and officials. Bitesi, baksi, jarguci were civil honours, while baturu, daicing, cuhur were military honours. Jasagh was granted to vassals with autonomous power, while darhan was a hereditary title divided into three classes. These titles were mostly awarded to Manchus and Mongols in the early Qing dynasty, but gradually fell out of use as the court became increasingly Sinicised.
- The privilege of wearing feathers on the mandarin hat; this privilege was known as lingyu (翎羽; língyǔ):
  - Peacock feathers (花翎; huālíng) were usually worn by imperial princes, prince consorts, imperial bodyguards and some high-ranking officials. Exceptionally, peacock feathers may be granted as a special honour. Two-eyed and three-eyed feathers were very rarely bestowed – only seven peers ever received the three-eyed feathers, while two dozens received the two-eyed feathers.
  - Blue feathers (蓝翎; 藍翎; lánlíng) were usually worn by household officials of the imperial and princely houses. Like peacock feathers, blue feathers may be granted as a special honour, usually to officials of the sixth pin and below.
  - Although a badge of honour, the feathers also symbolised bond servitude to the Emperor. As such, direct imperial clansmen and imperial princes ranked beile and above were prohibited from wearing feathers.
- The privilege of wearing the yellow jacket (武功黄马褂子; 武功黃馬褂子; wǔgōng huángmǎ guàzǐ; "yellow jacket of martial merit"). This is usually the uniform of imperial bodyguards, but it could also be bestowed upon anyone by the Emperor. A rare honour in the early Qing dynasty, it was diluted through excessive grants in the late Qing era. The jacket may only be worn in the Emperor's presence.
- The privilege of wearing imperial girdles (to both the recipient and his issue):
  - The yellow girdles (黄带子; 黃帶子; huángdàizi), or Uksun, were normally reserved for direct imperial clansmen (宗室; zōngshì), but may be granted to collateral imperial clansmen, known as gioro (觉罗; 覺羅; juéluó) as an honour. The yellow girdle entitled the wearer to be tried by the Imperial Clan Court as opposed to the general or banner courts.
  - The red girdles (红带子; 紅帶子; hóngdàizi) were normally reserved for collateral imperial clansmen, or gioro, as well as demoted direct imperial clansmen, with the privilege of wearing the red girdle.
  - The purple girdles (紫帶子; zǐdàizi) were normally reserved for demoted gioro. Uniquely, the family of Dahai, the "saint of Manchu" and the inventor of the Manchu script, was granted the privilege of wearing purple girdles, to symbolise his family as the "second clan of Manchu (inferior only to the Aisin Gioro)".
- Enshrinement in the Imperial Ancestral Temple (配享太廟; 配享太庙; pèixiǎng tàimiào). Granted to deceased peers (and sometimes also their wives), therefore a privilege for all his descendants. They were worshipped alongside the imperial ancestors, and their descendants had the privilege of sending representatives to participate in the imperial ancestral rituals. Imperial and Mongol princes were housed in the east wing of the temple, while the others were housed in the west wing. This was an extremely high honour, granted only 27 times throughout the Qing dynasty. Zhang Tingyu was the only Han subject to ever receive this honour, while Heling was the only person to have this honour revoked.
- Bestowal of Manchu, noble or imperial surnames (賜姓; 赐姓; cìxìng). Occasionally, a non-Manchu subject would be granted a Manchu surname, or a Manchu would be granted a more prestigious surname, or even the imperial surname "Gioro", thus adopting into the imperial clan.
- Promotion within the banner hierarchy:
  - A non-bannerman can be inducted into the banner system.
  - A Han bannerman (汉军八旗; 漢軍八旗; Hànjūn bāqí; nikan gūsa) may be elevated into a Manchu banner (满洲八旗; 滿洲八旗; Mǎnzhōu bāqí; manju gūsa).
  - A bannerman from the lower banners (plain red, bordered red, bordered white, plain blue, and bordered blue banners) can be elevated into the upper banners (plain yellow, bordered yellow, and plain white) (抬旗; táiqí). This was especially common for the imperial consorts and their clansmen.
- Court beads (朝珠; cháozhū). The court beads were part of the court uniform; the length of the beads normally corresponded to the courtier's pin. When a courtier kowtowed, the beads must touch the ground. Longer court beads were granted as a special favour regardless of the courtier's pin. This was often granted to elderly courtiers to relieve them of the physical hardship of kowtowing.
- The Spencer Museum of Art has six long pao robes (dragon robes) that belonged to Han Chinese nobility of the Qing dynasty. Ranked officials and Han Chinese nobles had two slits in the skirts while Manchu nobles and the Imperial family had 4 slits in skirts. All first, second and third rank officials as well as Han Chinese and Manchu nobles were entitled to wear 9 dragons by the Qing Illustrated Precedents. Qing sumptuary laws only allowed four clawed dragons for officials, Han Chinese nobles and Manchu nobles while the Qing Imperial family, emperor and princes up to the second degree and their female family members were entitled to wear five clawed dragons. However officials violated these laws all the time and wore 5 clawed dragons and the Spencer Museum's 6 long pao worn by Han Chinese nobles have 5 clawed dragons on them.
- Traditional Ming dynasty Hanfu robes given by the Ming Emperors to the Chinese noble Dukes Yansheng descended from Confucius are still preserved in the Confucius Mansion after over five centuries.

Robes from the Qing emperors are also preserved there. The Jurchens in the Jin dynasty and Mongols in the Yuan dynasty continued to patronize and support the Confucian Duke Yansheng.

== Etymology of Manchu titles ==
With only a few exceptions, most Manchu titles ultimately derived from Han Chinese roots.

- Han, used by the Emperor himself and a few Mongol lords, was borrowed from the Turko-Mongol Khan, Khaan or Khagan. In Manchu, however, the word is written slightly differently for the Emperor and other Khans.
- Beile was usually considered an indigenous Manchu title, evolved from earlier Jurchen bojile, which may ultimately be derived from the Turkic title bey or beg or even Chinese bo (伯, "count").
- Beise was originally the plural form of beile, but later evolved into a separate title.
- Janggin derived from the Chinese military title jiangjun (將軍, "general"). In Manchu, however, janggin evolved into a nominal title distinct from the military office, which is translated in Manchu as jiyanggiyūn.
- Taiji or tayiji derived from Chinese taizi (太子, "crown prince"). In Chinese, it was used exclusively by heirs of imperial, royal or princely titles. Among the Mongols, however, the Borjigits have long used it as a distinct title.
- Tabunang ("son-in-law") was originally the title given to a Mongol prince consort who married a Borjigit princess. It was granted to Jelme, and his descendants continued to use this title.
- Fujin (福晉) is a consort of a prince ranked junwang or above. This word evolved from Chinese furen (夫人; "lady", "madame" or "wife"), but was reserved for high-ranked ladies. Furen was used by lower-ranked married ladies.
- A-ge (阿哥) is a Manchu word meaning both "lord, chief" and "elder brother". It is derived from the Mongolic word aka, and cognate with the Turkic word agha.

== See also ==
- Chinese nobility
- Mongolian nobility
- Imperial Chinese harem system § Qing
