= Isangga =

Isangga (Manchu: ᡳᠰᠠᠩᡤᠠ, romanized: Isangga; 1638–1703) was a Qing statesman of the Irgen Gioro clan of the Plain Yellow Banner. His family originated from Warka, and his grandfather Jorika, following the steps of his then tribal leader Hecen, had joined to Nurhaci's forces in the early expansion of the Jianzhou Jurchen tribal state. During the reign of the Kangxi Emperor, Isangga successively served as Minister of Personnel, Revenue, Rites, War, and Works, eventually rising to the position of Grand Secretary of the Wenhua Hall (文華殿大學士).

== Biography ==
Isangga obtained the degree of Jinshi (進士) in the 1655 imperial examination during the Shunzhi reign. He began his official career as a bithe-si (secretarial clerk) in the Ministry of Rites and was later promoted to Principal Secretary of the same ministry. Over the course of his career, he served as Grand Secretariat Academician, Lecturer at the Imperial Classics Lectures, Right Vice Minister of Rites, and Left Vice Minister of Revenue. In 1677, during the Revolt of the Three Feudatories, he was sent to Jiangnan to supervise the construction of warships. In 1682, following Russian incursions along the frontier, he was sent to Ningguta to oversee shipbuilding in preparation for military mobilization. He was subsequently transferred to the Ministry of Personnel.

In 1684, Isangga accompanied the Kangxi Emperor on his southern tour and was instructed to inspect coastal defenses and administrative affairs at important seaports. He later served as Minister of War and Minister of Rites. In 1688, he was appointed Grand Secretary of Wenhua Hall while concurrently serving as Minister of Personnel. He also acted as chief editor of the Veritable History of Three Reigns (三朝國史). In 1697, when the Kangxi Emperor personally led the campaign against Galdan Boshugtu Khan, Isangga was ordered to establish relay stations in Ningxia. He later worked alongside Grand Secretary Alantai as chief editor of the Imperial Gazetteer of the Strategy in the Pacification of Northern Desert (平定朔漠方略).

For fifteen years, Isangga played a leading role in state administration and was particularly noted for his expertise in judicial affairs. Whenever the emperor consulted him on criminal cases, he was able to respond in detail, and his colleagues highly regarded his knowledge of legal institutions and judicial precedents. In 1697, due to his old age, Isangga requested retirement, but the Kangxi Emperor refused his resignation because of his long and valued service. In 1702, he again requested retirement on account of illness. This time the request was approved, and he was allowed to retain the privileges of his former office. Isangga died in 1703 at the age of sixty-six. He was posthumously awarded the posthumous name Wenduan (文端， “Learned and Upright”). During the mid-Qianlong period, he was enshrined in the Hall of Worthies (賢良祠).

One of Isangga's sons, Iduri, served as a governor-general (总督). Iduri's son Fusengge became the son-in-law of Yinxiang, Prince Yi, and was granted the title of Imperial Prince Consort (和碩額駙). Kargišan, Governor-General of Fujian and Zhejiang (閩浙總督) and a descendant of Hecen, was his clansman.
