= Kargišan =

Kargišan (Manchu: ᡴᠠᡵᡤᡳᡧᠠᠨ, romanized: Kargišan; ?–1757) was a Manchu official of the Qing dynasty. He belonged to the Irgen Gioro clan of the Plain Yellow Banner. He rose to the position of Governor-General of Fujian and Zhejiang (閩浙總督).

== Biography ==
Kargišan was a clansman of Grand Secretary Isangga. His great-great-grandfather Hecen (赫臣) was the chieftain of the clan from Warka at the time and joined Jianzhou Jurchen leader Nurhaci's tribe. Hecen was later sent as an envoy to the Yehe confederacy, where he was ordered execution by its ruler Gintaisi. After Nurhaci destroyed Yehe, he ordered Kargišan's great-grandfather — Hecen's son Keifu — to personally execute his father's killer. Keifu followed Nurhaci in numerous campaigns and rendered meritorious service, rising to the hereditary rank of Third-class Light Chariot Commandant(輕車都尉). Kargišan's grandfather Kacilan (喀齊蘭) served as Vice Commander-in-Chief of the Plain Yellow Banner; his father Kailibu (凱里布) served as Minister of Personnel and inherited the hereditary rank.

Kargišan inherited the hereditary rank (騎都尉) and the position of hereditary niru (company) commander (世管佐領) in his early age. He subsequently served as a vice director in the Imperial Stables (上駟院員外郎), Director in the Ministry of Works (工部郎中), and Vice Minister of War. In 1735, he was dismissed for submitting a false report on horse inspection and was sent to Mukden to handle grain storage duties. In 1736, he was reinstated and tasked with managing the Banners troops at the Summer Palace(圓明園). In 1738, he was appointed Academician of the Grand Secretariat and Vice Minister of Revenue, and later transferred to Vice Minister of Personnel.

In 1740, he was appointed Governor of Shanxi. The Qianlong Emperor, having heard reports of corruption by Shanxi Provincial Administration Commissioner Sahaliyan (薩哈諒) and Education Commissioner Harcin (哈爾欽), consulted Kargišan. Kargišan promptly memorialized impeaching them. The emperor ordered Vice Minister Yang Sijing (楊嗣璟) to jointly investigate. However, the emperor faulted Kargišan for knowing of the misconduct without immediately impeaching, charging him with negligence and dismissing him temporarily before reinstatement. In 1742, he was transferred to Governor of Anhui, and the following year to Governor of Shandong. During his tenure, he repeatedly petitioned for disaster relief and reorganized mining operations in Shandong. In 1746, he was promoted to Governor-General of Fujian and Zhejiang and ordered to deploy troops to suppress a rebellion in Taiwan. He was later granted the honorary title of Minister of War. In 1752, he requested retirement due to old age, but the Qianlong Emperor persuaded him to stay. He died in 1757 and received the posthumous name Zhuangke (莊恪, Dignified and Reverent).

His eldest son Dingchang (定長) also rose to the rank of Governor-General. His grandson Oyombu served as Governor of Guizhou and as Minister in Charge of Yarkant Affairs, among other positions.
