= Oyombu =

Oyombu (Manchu: ᠣᠶᠣᠮᠪᡠ, romanized: Oyombu; 1748-1811) was a Qing dynasty official of the Irgen Gioro clan and a member of the Manchu Plain Yellow Banner. He served in a number of senior positions, including Governor of Guizhou and Minister Superintendent of Yarkant (葉爾羌辦事大臣).

== Biography ==
Oyombu was a grandson of Kargišan, Governor-General of Min-Zhe(閩浙总督). He began his career as a bithesi (secretarial clerk) and was promoted three times to the post of Supervising Secretary in the Ministry of Works. In 1796, the first year of the Jiaqing reign, he was appointed Prefect of Hanzhong in Shaanxi. The Jiaqing Emperor, considering him a worthy descendant of Kargišan and a representative of his family's traditions, rapidly promoted him to Intendant of Xining in Gansu, then to Provincial Treasurer of Jiangsu and Acting Governor of Anhui. Shortly thereafter, several criminal cases that Oyombu had recommended for suspended execution during the Autumn Assizes were reclassified by the Board of Punishments as deserving immediate execution. The emperor criticized him for excessive leniency and ordered the Ministry of Personnel to consider his demotion, but ultimately allowed him to remain in office. He was later promoted to Governor of Guizhou. When he was recalled on account of old age, he departed immediately upon receiving the order. The Jiaqing Emperor reportedly regarded this as inappropriate, ordered the Ministry of Personnel to review the matter, and stripped him of his office. He was subsequently reappointed as a bithesi, granted the rank of Blue-Feather Guard (藍翎侍衛), and assigned as Minister Superintendent of Yarkant. He died of illness not long afterward.

His son, Dohun, served as Surveillance Commissioner of Sichuan (四川按察使).
