= Iduri =

Iduri (Manchu: ᡳᡩᡠ᠋ᡵᡳ, romanized: Iduri; 1687–1753) was a Qing official of the Irgen Gioro clan of the Plain Yellow Banner. He was the son of the Grand Secretary Isangga and successively served as Vice Minister of Justice, Governor of Shanxi, and Governor of Jiangxi.

== Biography ==
Iduri obtained the degree of Juren (舉人) after passing the provincial examination of 1699 during the reign of the Kangxi Emperor. He began his official career as an assistant director in the Imperial Household Department and later served as Vice Minister of Justice, Governor of Shanxi, and in several other senior administrative posts. However, he subsequently became implicated in an official case and was stripped of his offices. In 1729, Iduri was assigned to the military headquarters of the general Furdan, where he was placed in charge of military provisions and finances. In recognition of his service, he was appointed an Extra Vice Minister (額外侍郞). In 1735, however, he was found guilty of embezzling and misappropriating military supplies and funds. As a result, he was dismissed from office and imprisoned. Although he was at one point sentenced to death, the sentence was not carried out. He was pardoned and released in 1742, and died of illness in 1753.

Iduri was also known for his literary interests and left behind several works, including the Collected Poems of the Hall of Joy (嘉楽堂詩集) and the preface to the Collected Poems of the Hall of Illuminating Virtue (明善堂詩集序). His son Fusengge became the son-in-law of Yinxiang, Prince Yi and was likewise noted for his literary talent.
