= Gioro =

Title for Qing imperial family clansmen

Gioro (Manchu: ᡤᡳᠣᡵᠣ, romanized: Gioro), commonly known as the Red Belts (紅帶子), was a title designated for the distant clansmen of the Qing imperial family. It was prefixed to a person's given name in the form "Gioro-i XX". When used as a title, its meaning and usage differed from those of the surname Gioro.

== Overview ==
In 1636, Hong Taiji, the Taizong Emperor of the Qing dynasty, announced that the direct descendants of Taksi, Nurhaci's father who was posthumously honored as Emperor Xianzu, were to be designated as members of the Uksun (宗室, imperial clansmen). The descendants of Taksi's uncles and brothers were designated Gioro (覺羅, distant imperial clansmen). Members of Uksun wore yellow belts around their robes, whereas the Gioro members wore red belts, as privilege.

However, the privilege could be taken away from disgraced members of the Gioro, who would wear purple belts and were placed at the very end of the book of imperial clansmen (玉牒, the Jade Register). Meanwhile, unlike Uksun members who used imperial noble ranks (e.g. Prince, Imperial dukes, Imperial generals), Gioro, actually aligning with non-Aisin Gioro individuals, could only be awarded non-imperial noble titles (duke, marquis, count, viscount, baron, light chariot commandant, knight commandant, etc).
