= Fusengge =

Fusengge (Manchu: ᡶ᠋ᡠᠰᡝᠩᡤᡝ, romanized: Fusengge: dates unknown) was a Qing military official, nobleman, and literatus of the Irgen Gioro clan of the Manchu Plain Yellow Banner. His courtesy name was Zanhou (賛侯) or Zanxian (賛咸). He was the son of Governor Iduri and became the son-in-law of Yinxiang, Prince Yi, for which he was granted the title of hošo efu (Imperial Prince Consort). Throughout his career, Fusengge served as Commander-in-Chief of Taiyuan (太原総兵), Vice Commander of the Plain Blue Banner Mongol Corps (正藍旗蒙古副都統), Imperial Guard Minister (散秩大臣), Vice Minister of War in Mukden (盛京兵部侍郎), Vice Commander of Mukden (盛京副都統), General of Jiangning (江寧将軍), General of Guangzhou (廣州将軍), and General of Fuzhou (福州将軍). Fusengge was renowned for his refined literary tastes and accomplishments in poetry, calligraphy, and painting. His collected works, the Collected Works of the Studio of Refined Appreciation (酌雅斎集), have preserved to the present day.
