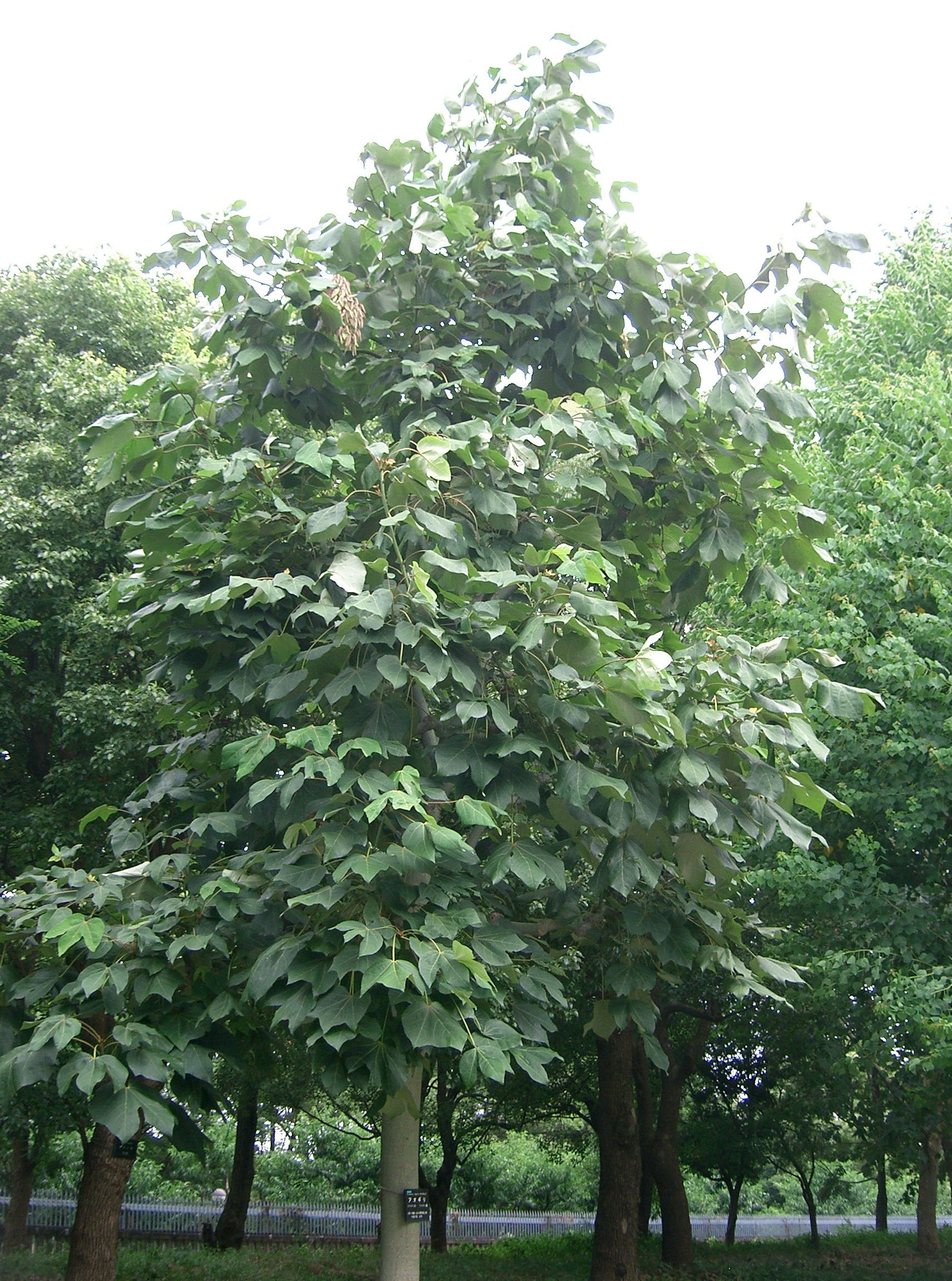

Conservation status
- Least Concern (IUCN 3.1)

Scientific classification
- Kingdom: Plantae
- Clade: Tracheophytes
- Clade: Angiosperms
- Clade: Eudicots
- Clade: Rosids
- Order: Malvales
- Family: Malvaceae
- Genus: Firmiana
- Species: F. simplex

Binomial name
- Firmiana simplex (L.) W.Wight

Synonyms
- Hibiscus collinus Roxb.; Hibiscus simplex L.; Firmiana platanifolia R.Br.; Sterculia platanifolia L.f.; Sterculia simplex (L.) Druce; Sterculia urens Roxb.

= Firmiana simplex =

Chinese parasol tree

Species of flowering plant

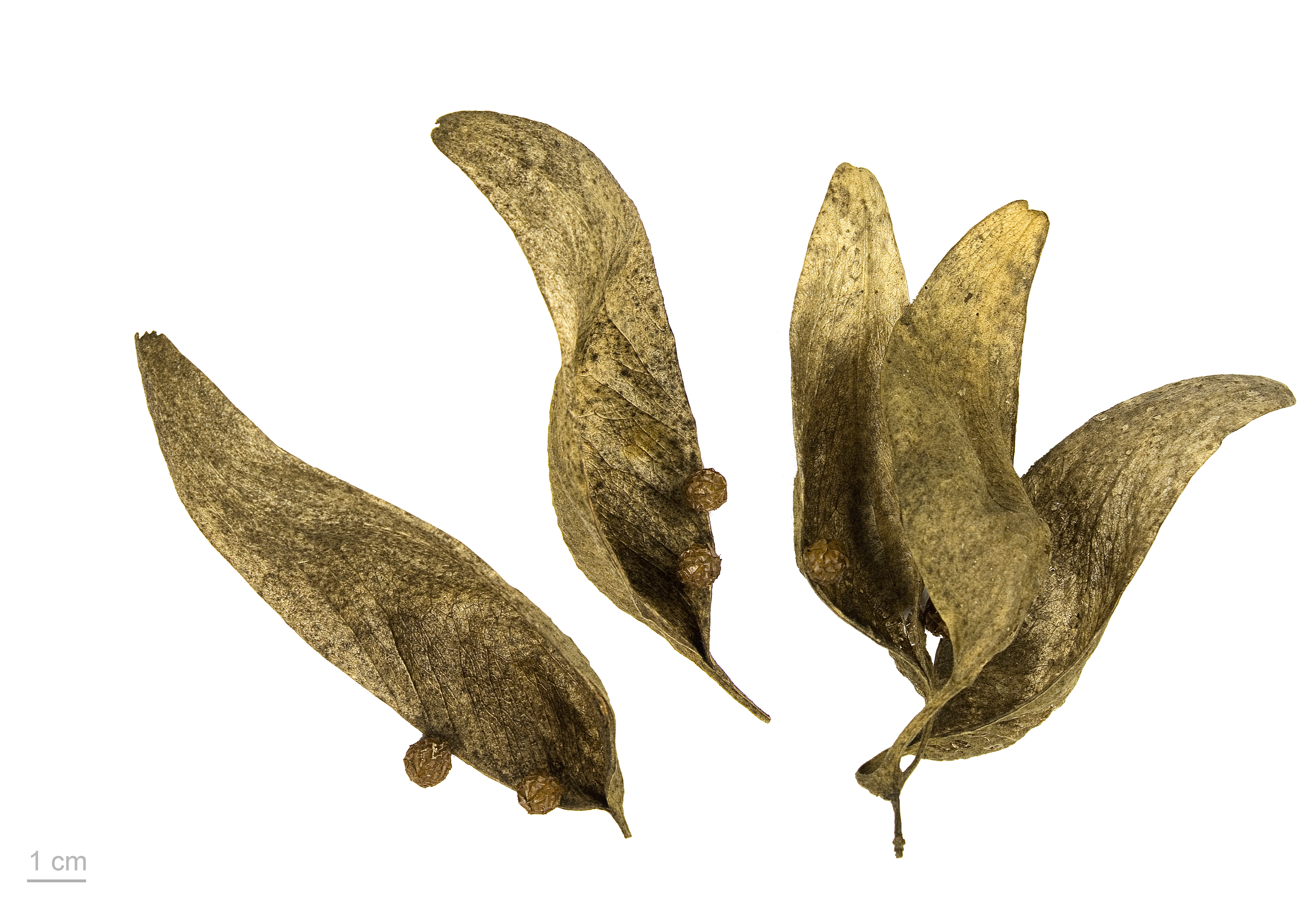
Firmiana simplex – MHNT

Firmiana simplex, commonly known as the Chinese parasol tree, or wutong (Chinese: 梧桐; pinyin: wútóng; jap.: godō), is a tree in the family Malvaceae, formerly in the family Sterculiaceae, in the order Malvales, and native to Asia. It grows up to 16 m (52 ft) tall.

== Description ==
It has alternate, deciduous leaves 15–30 cm (6–12 in) across, palmately lobed with three or five lobes, and small fragrant, greenish-white flowers borne in large inflorescences. A flowering tree varies in fragrance with weather and time of the day, having a lemony scent with citronella and chocolate tones. The flowers are pollinated by bees. The seedpod is dehiscent like a pair of brown ovate leaves with seeds along the edges. Up to five pairs are produced by each flower.

== Uses ==
Due to its sonic properties similar to the paulownia and candlenut (even conflated with the former both as 桐 tóng pre-scientific era), the wood is used for the soundboards of several Chinese instruments, including the guqin and guzheng.

The roasted seeds have reportedly been used to make into a tea.

The Taivoan people in the Nanzixian River basin of Taiwan harvest the tough bark of 2–3-year-old trees. After soaking it by the river for about a month, they remove the rotted bark and twist the remaining fibers into ropes. These ropes can be used for making traps or other binding purposes, particularly for constructing wild boar traps. The robust nature of these ropes helps prevent the boars from escaping.

== Invasive species ==
It is grown as an ornamental tree in warm regions of North America; it has become an aggressive, invasive weed in the region. It is self-fertile, and its seeds spread readily, especially along watercourses, growing rapidly after germination in favorable sites. The seedlings compete effectively with many other species.
