= Yangguri =

Manchu name
- Manchu script: ᠶᠠᠩᡤᡠᡵᡳ
- Möllendorff: yangguri

Chinese name
- Chinese: 扬古利
Transcriptions
Standard Mandarin
- Hanyu Pinyin: yáng gǔ lì

Yangguri Efu (1572 – 1 February 1637) was a Manchu military commander of the Šumuru clan from Kūrka and a member of the Plain Yellow Banner. A son-in-law (efu) of Nurhaci, he was one of the principal founding generals of the Later Jin Khanate and Qing empire. He was posthumously created Prince Wuxun (武勳王), one of only two non-imperial Manchu nobles in Qing history to receive the title of prince, alongside Fuk'anggan.

== Biography ==
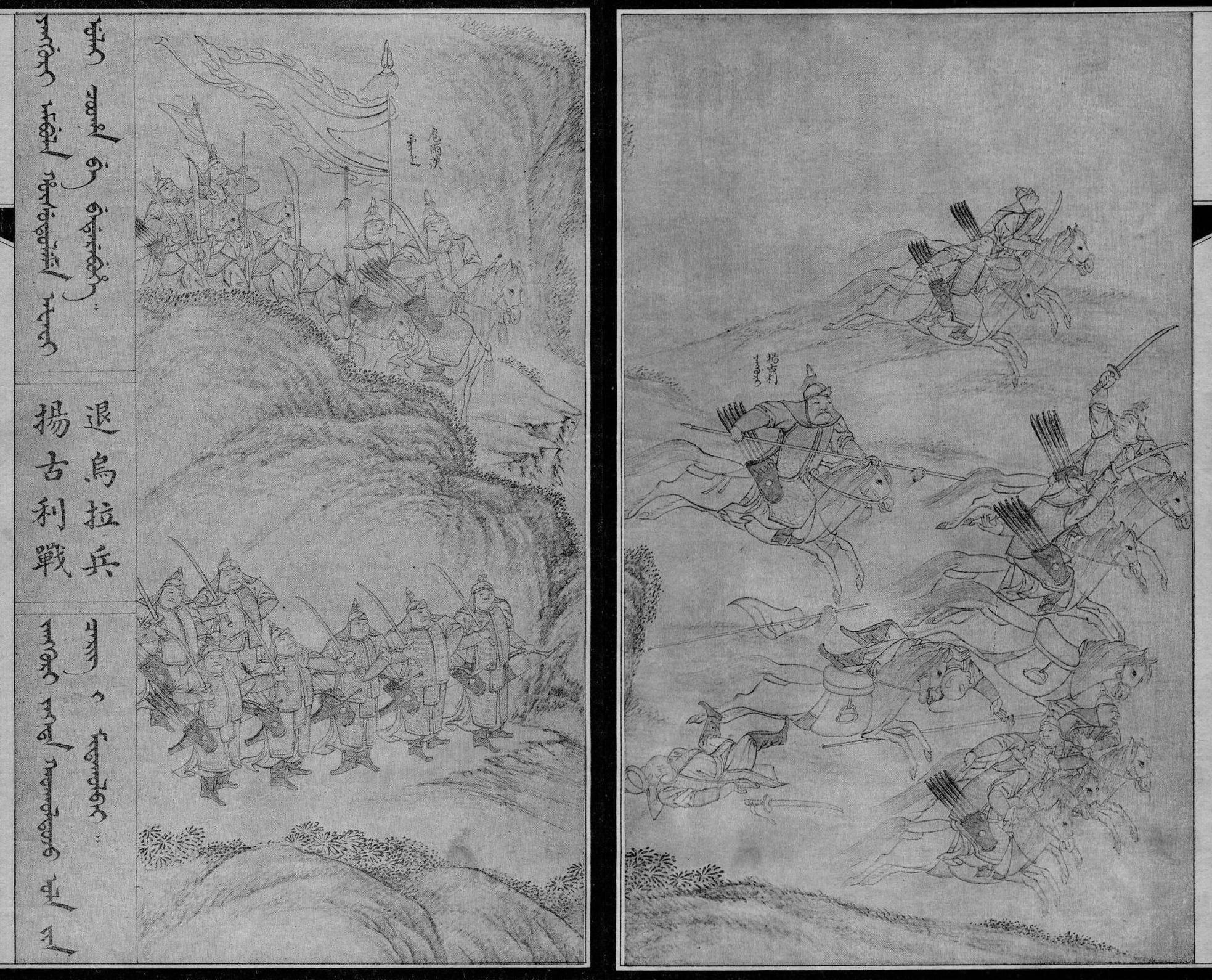
Yangguri (the commander on the right) pursuing troops of Ula tribal nation

Yangguri's father, Langju, was chief of the Kūrka tribe and an early supporter of Nurhaci. After Langju was murdered by a traitor, the fourteen-year-old Yangguri personally killed his father's murderer, earning Nurhaci's favor. Nurhaci later married one of his daughters to him and appointed him to the Plain Yellow Banner. Yangguri first gained distinction defending the Yalu River and subsequently distinguished himself in campaigns against Hada, Huifa, Ula, Jušeri, and Neyen. In 1599, he was the first to clime walls of Hada castle and captured its ruler Menggebulu.

During the Battle of Sarhū in 1619, Yangguri played a key role in defeating the Ming armies under Du Song (杜松) and Ma Lin (馬林). He later participated in the conquests of Tieling and Shenyang-Liaoyang, and was appointed Viscount First-Class, taking command of the Left Wing of the Eight Banner armies. In 1625, he annihilated a Ming raiding force sent by Mao Wenlong, for which his hereditary title was promoted to Duke Third-Class.

Under Hong Taiji, Yangguri continued to distinguish himself. He fought in the 1629 campaign against Beijing, defeating the Ming commander Man Gui (滿桂) and rescuing Qing artillery units caught in an ambush. He later fought in campaigns against Chahar, Jinzhou, Datong, and Xuanfu. In 1633, he successfully urged Hong Taiji to continue offensive operations against the Ming rather than adopt a defensive strategy. In recognition of his long military service, he was promoted to Duke First-Class in 1634. Additionally, he took part in the 1636 invasion of Ming China, during which Qing forces captured twelve fortified cities around Beijing.

Yangguri then accompanied Hong Taiji on the Qing invasion of Joseon (1636–1637). On 1 February 1637, while leading an assault against Joseon forces south of the Han River, he was struck by enemy gunfire concealed on a cliff and died of his wounds at the age of sixty-six. Hong Taiji personally mourned Yangguri, provided an imperial-level funeral, and ordered his burial in Fuling Mausoleum. He was posthumously granted the title Prince Wuxun and later enshrined in the Imperial Ancestral Temple. His descendants succeeded the hereditary title of Duke First-Class Yingcheng (一等英誠公).
