= Lishui (sea-waves) =

Chinese diagonal sea-waves decorative pattern used in textile and clothing

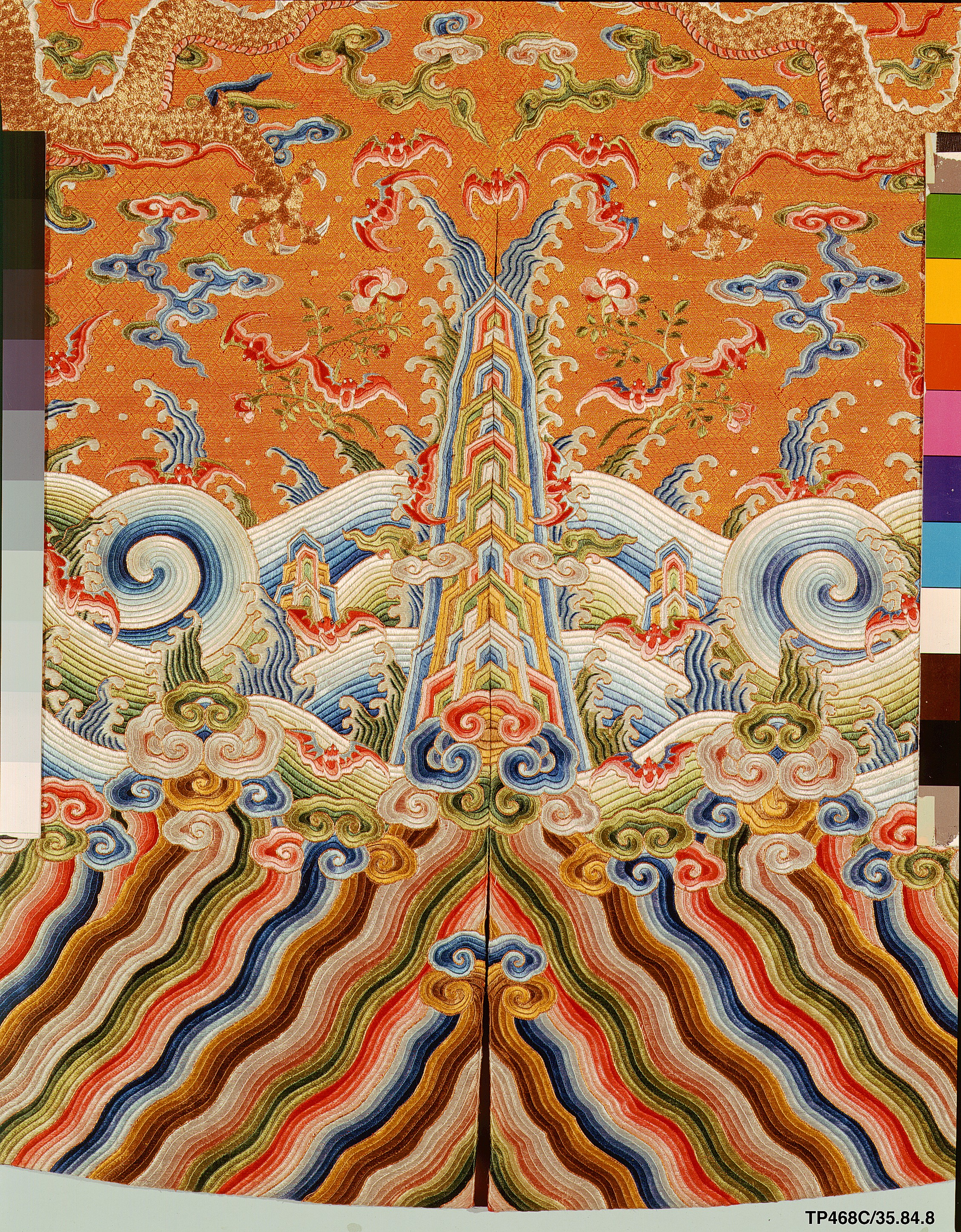
- Lishui (diagonal and parallel wavy multicoloured stripes), Qing dynasty

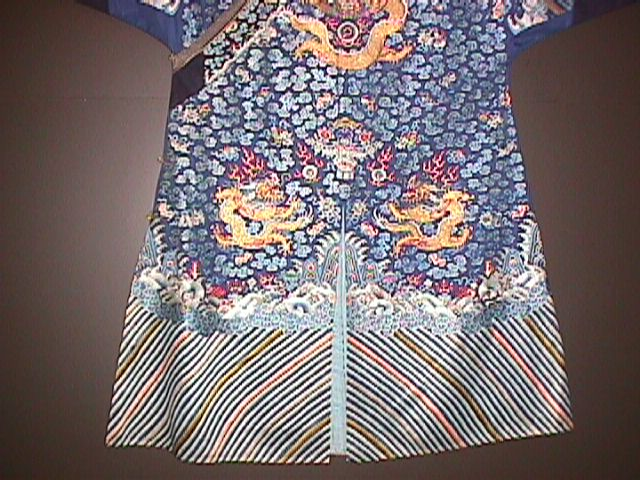
- Lishui (diagonal and parallel straight multicoloured stripes), Qing dynasty

Chinese name
- Chinese: 立水
- Literal meaning: Standing water
Transcriptions
Standard Mandarin
- Hanyu Pinyin: Lìshuǐ

English name
- English: Lishui waves/ Lishui stripes/ Lishui border

Lishui (Chinese: 立水; pinyin: lìshuǐ; lit. 'standing water') or shuijiao (Chinese: 水脚; Chinese: shuǐjiǎo; lit. 'water feet') is a set of parallel diagonal (either straight or wavy), multicoloured sea-waves/line patterns. It originated in China where it was used by the Qing dynasty court prior to the mid-18th century. Lishui represents the deep sea under which the ocean surges and waves; it is therefore typically topped with "still water" wòshuǐ (卧水), also called píngshuǐ (平水), which is represented by concentric semicircle patterns which runs horizontally. Lishui was used to decorate garments, including the bottom hem and cuffs of some of the court clothing of the Qing dynasty. It could be used to decorate as wedding dress items. It is also used to decorate Chinese opera costumes, typically on the bottom hem of the costumes. It was also adopted in some court clothing of the Nguyen dynasty in Vietnam under the influence of the Qing dynasty.

== Cultural significance and symbolism ==
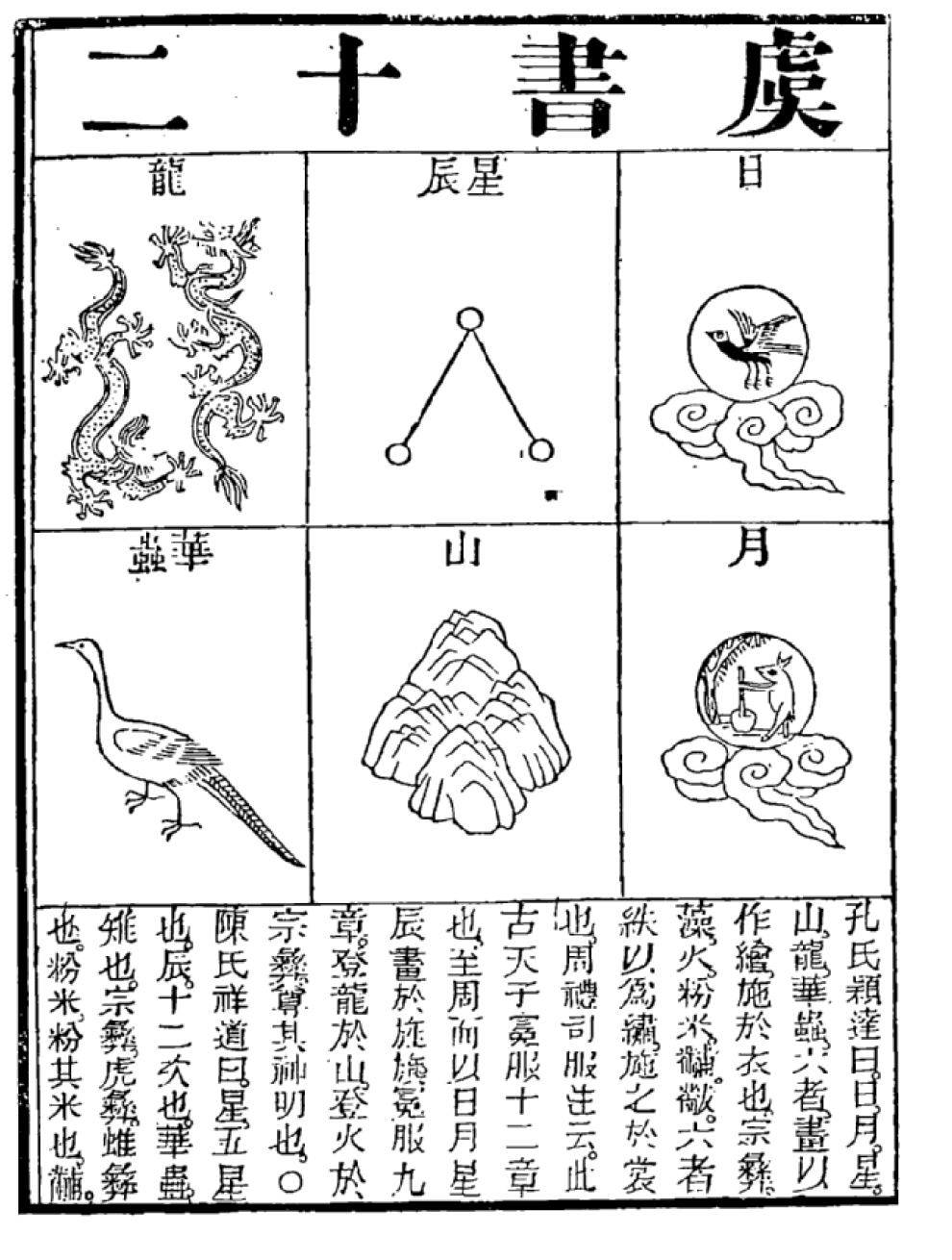
Sacred mountain, one of the twelve ornaments.

In ancient China, embroideries on clothing were not only used as a mean to embellish clothing but also held symbolic meanings.

When used on dragon robes, lishui could be combined with turbulent waves and a rock in the middle of the clothing. Lishui represents the deep water; the rock represents the "sacred mountain" (山; shān), which is the representation of the Universe or the Earth. The turbulent waves were buddhist elements. Waves patterns (usually shaped in semicircles as found in woshui (卧水) patterns) are often used to represent tides (潮; cháo) which is the homophone and symbolism for the court "audience" (朝; cháo). Therefore, when worn together, these motifs mean that the wearer of clothing is the "centre of the symbolic universe" being the ruler over the waters, the Earth and Heavens. Lishui could be found in the five colours. Sometimes, within the waves pattern, other religious (Taoist and Buddhist symbols) and auspicious Chinese symbols were added, such as clouds.

== History ==
In the Ming dynasty, patterns of sea "waves breaking against rocks" were already in use in the Emperor's dragon robe in the early 16th century in order to create a cosmic landscape for the imperial dragons. Other forms of court robes in Ming dynasty worn by nobles, officials and their wives (such as the bufu, i.e. robe with mandarin square) also used ocean waves patterns in the form of concentric semicircles (woshui) as clothing ornaments.

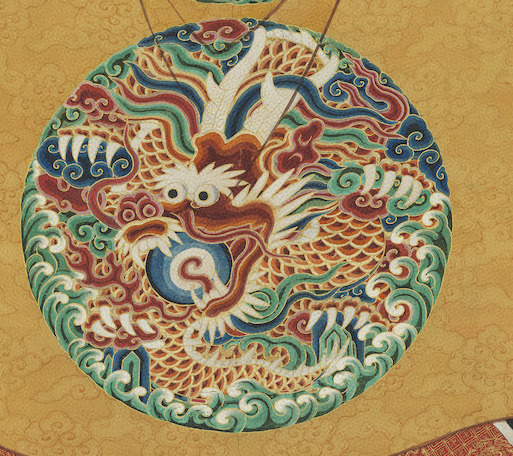
Dragon roundels with waves breaking on rock, from cropped from a Ming dynasty dragon robe.

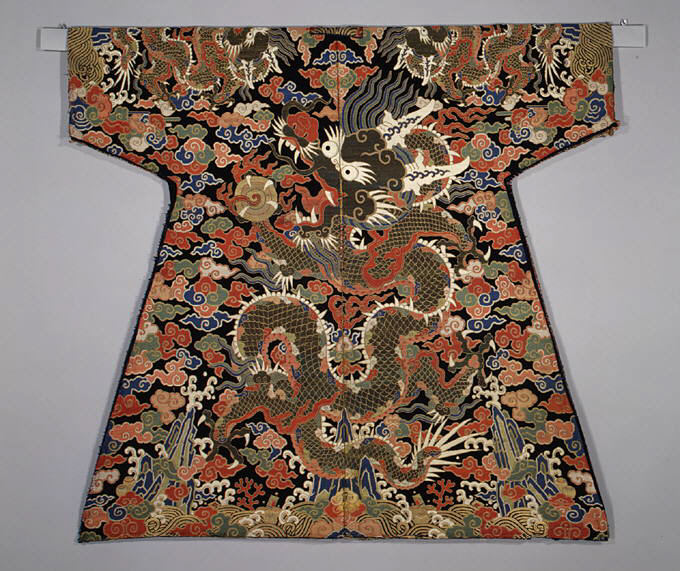
Dragon robe with woshui (卧水) and waves crashing on rocks but no lishui (立水), dragon robes follows the Ming dynasty design-style, early Qing dynasty, 17th century

After the conquest of the Ming dynasty by the Manchu and the establishment of the Qing dynasty, the Manchu rulers inherited the dragon robes of the Ming dynasty which they would refit and modify these robes by adding their own their own Manchu-style features similarly to how the Manchu (and their predecessors, the Jurchens) used to modify the dragons robes bestowed by the Ming dynasty prior to the Ming dynasty conquest. Some early designs of the Qing dynasty jifu (dragon/python robe) showed patterns of woshui at the bottom hem of the robe but did not have the presence of lishui; this form of dragon robe eventually disappeared in the mid-18th century, possibly having fallen out of fashion.

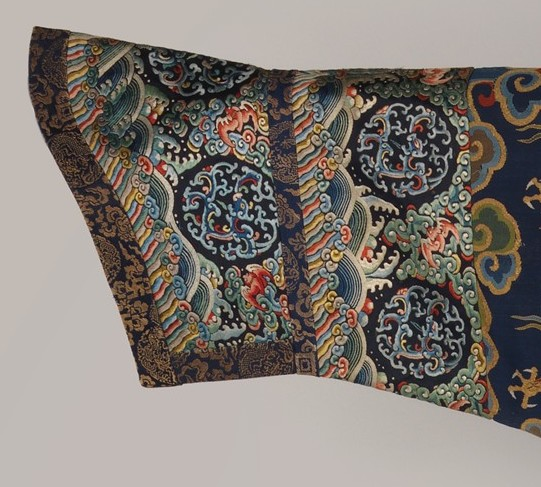
Lishui, followed by woshui, followed by turbulent waves; found on the sleeves of a dragon robe (jifu), 17th century

By the end of the 17th century, the Manchu rulers wanted to re-imagine the imagery of their dragon robes to emphasize on the centrality of the emperor within the cosmos and within the imperial court. The Manchu rulers thus decided to redesign and regulate the decorative patterns found on their court robes by introducing and applying elaborate pattern designs on their court robes. Designs and construction of the Qing dynasty court robes were enacted and regulated through imperial edicts; the dress code was a mixed of Manchu (i.e. clothing cut-style) and Ming dynasty Chinese traditions in terms of prescribed designs. The decorative patterns and visual motifs used by the Manchu rulers were adopted from the Han Chinese's adornment designs, decorations, and symbols rooted in Taoism and Buddhism; they were then adapted into new set of designs. Lishui was thus added to on the bottom hem and/or on the sleeves of the court robes. Lishui found on the bottom of robes were initially short in length but gradually increased in length until the end of the dynasty.

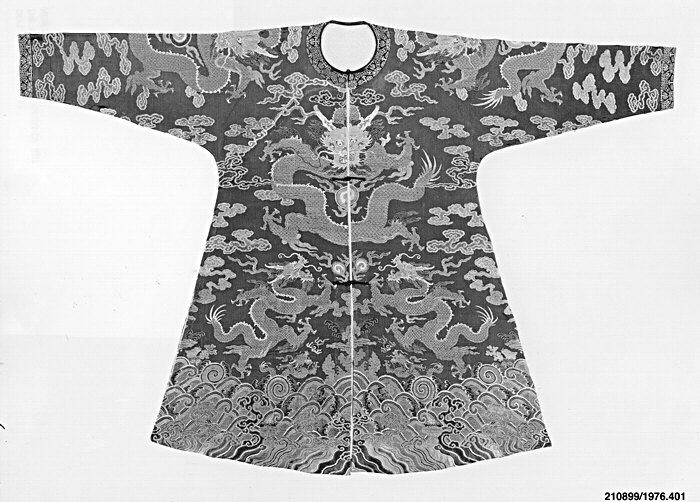
Lishui, Yongzheng period (1723–35)

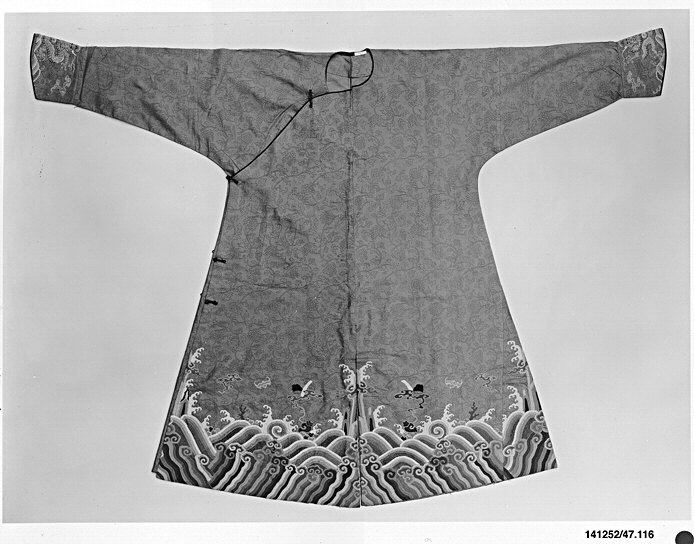
Lishui, 18th century

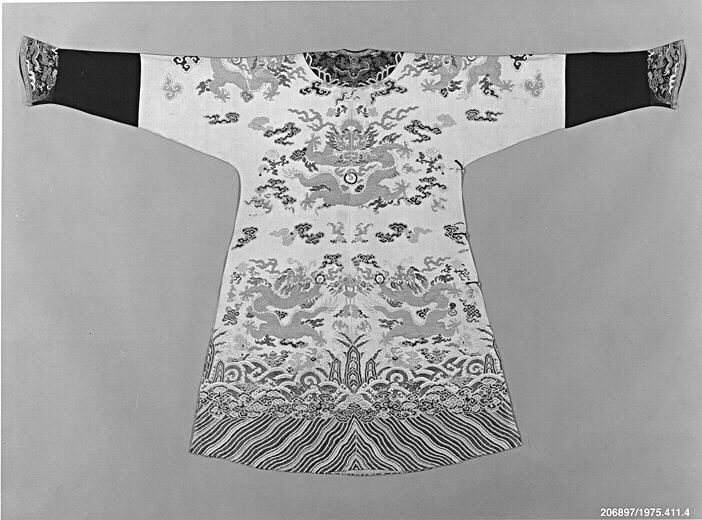
Lishui, 18th century

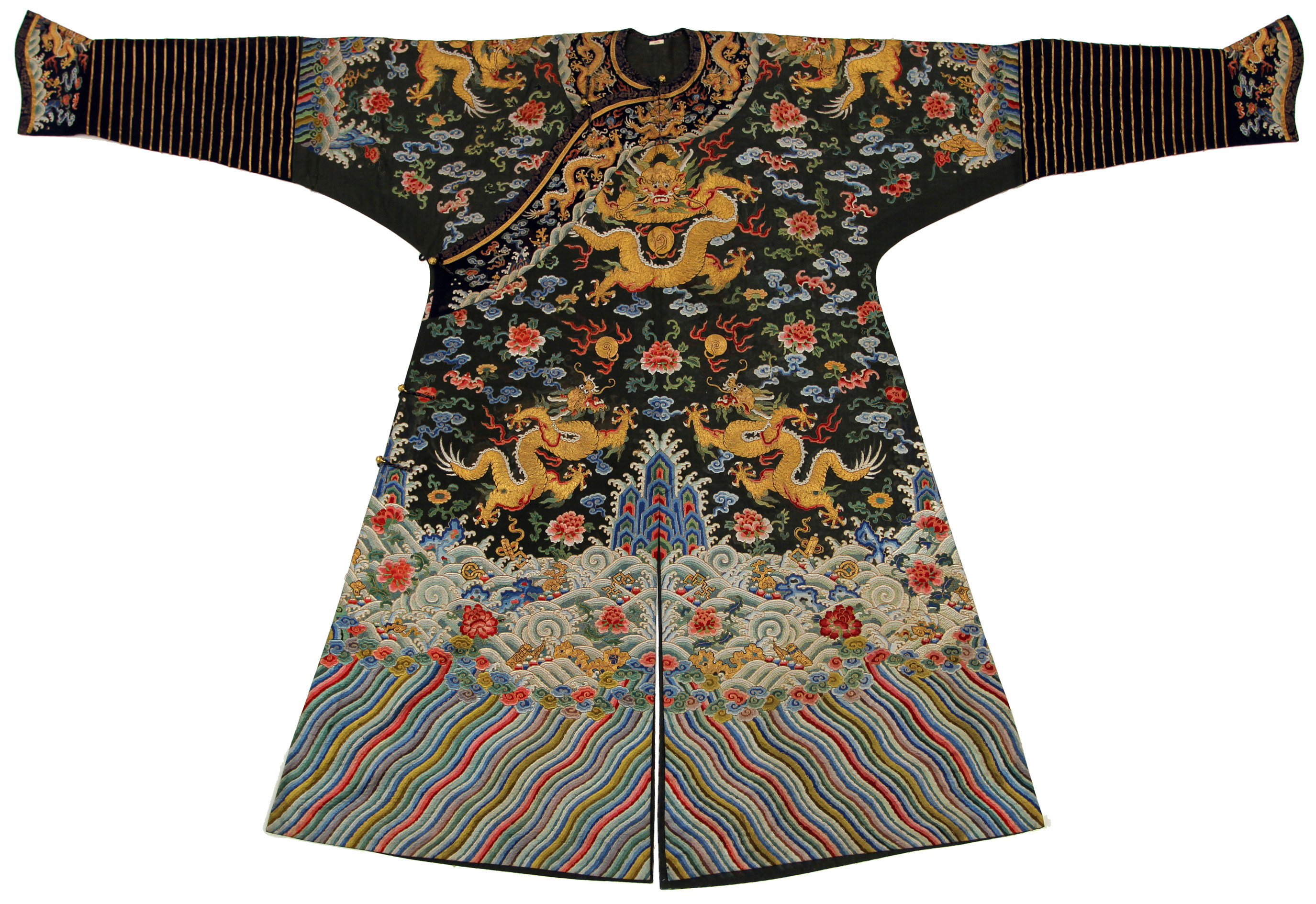
Lishui, first half 18th century

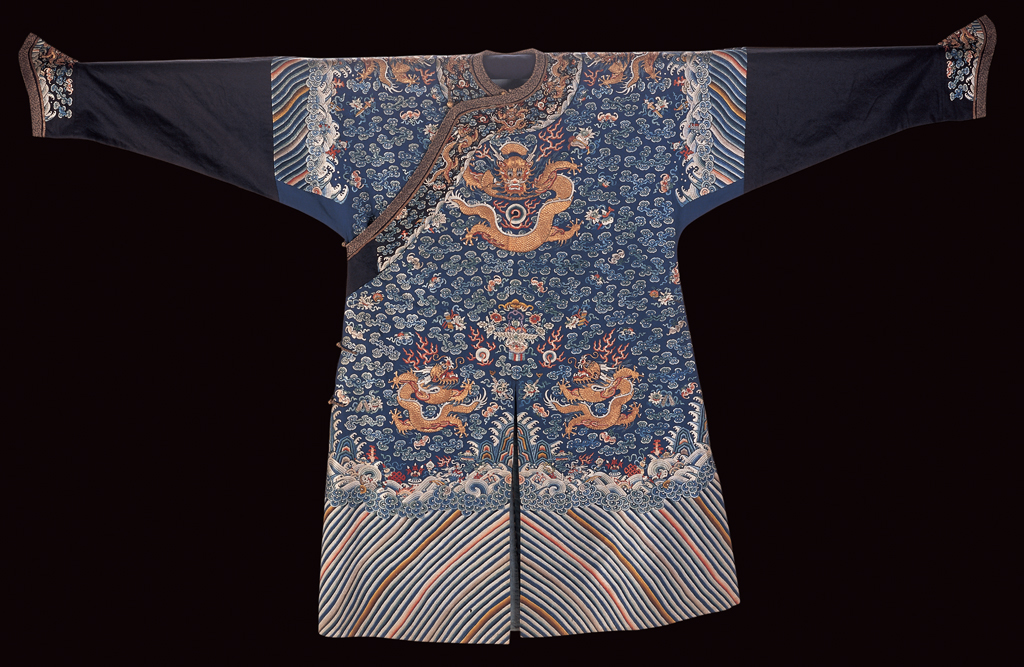
Lishui, late 19th Century

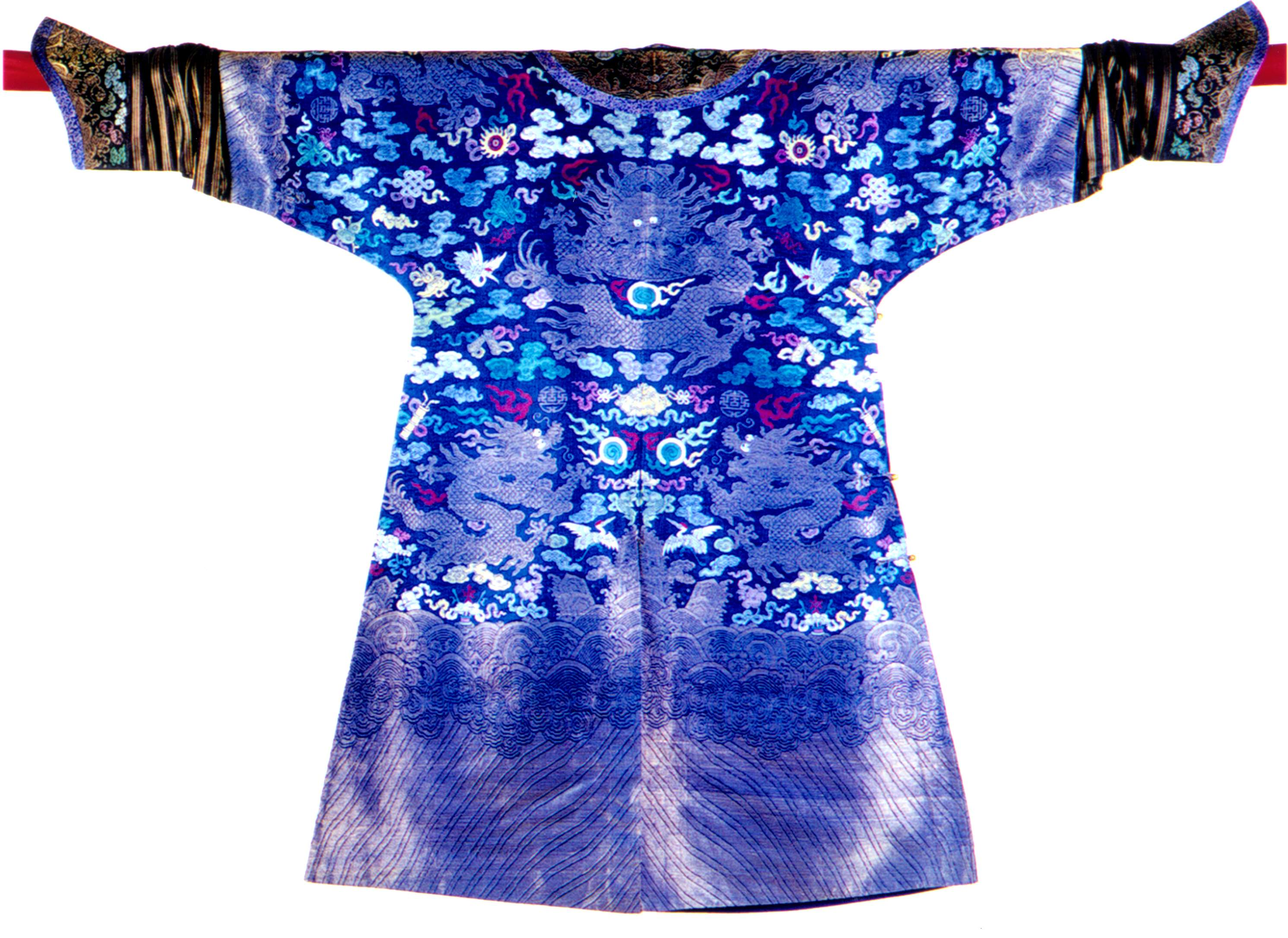
Lishui, circa 1900.

== Usage ==
=== Court clothing and wedding clothing ===
The lishui was used to decorate the hem of the Qing dynasty court robes, such as the dragon robes, the python robes, the surcoats (e.g. gunfu/ jifu gua/ longgua), the jifupao (e.g. Manchu wedding dress), chaogua, and on the mandarin square. They could also be used to decorate the wedding attire and xiapei of the Han Chinese women in the Qing dynasty.

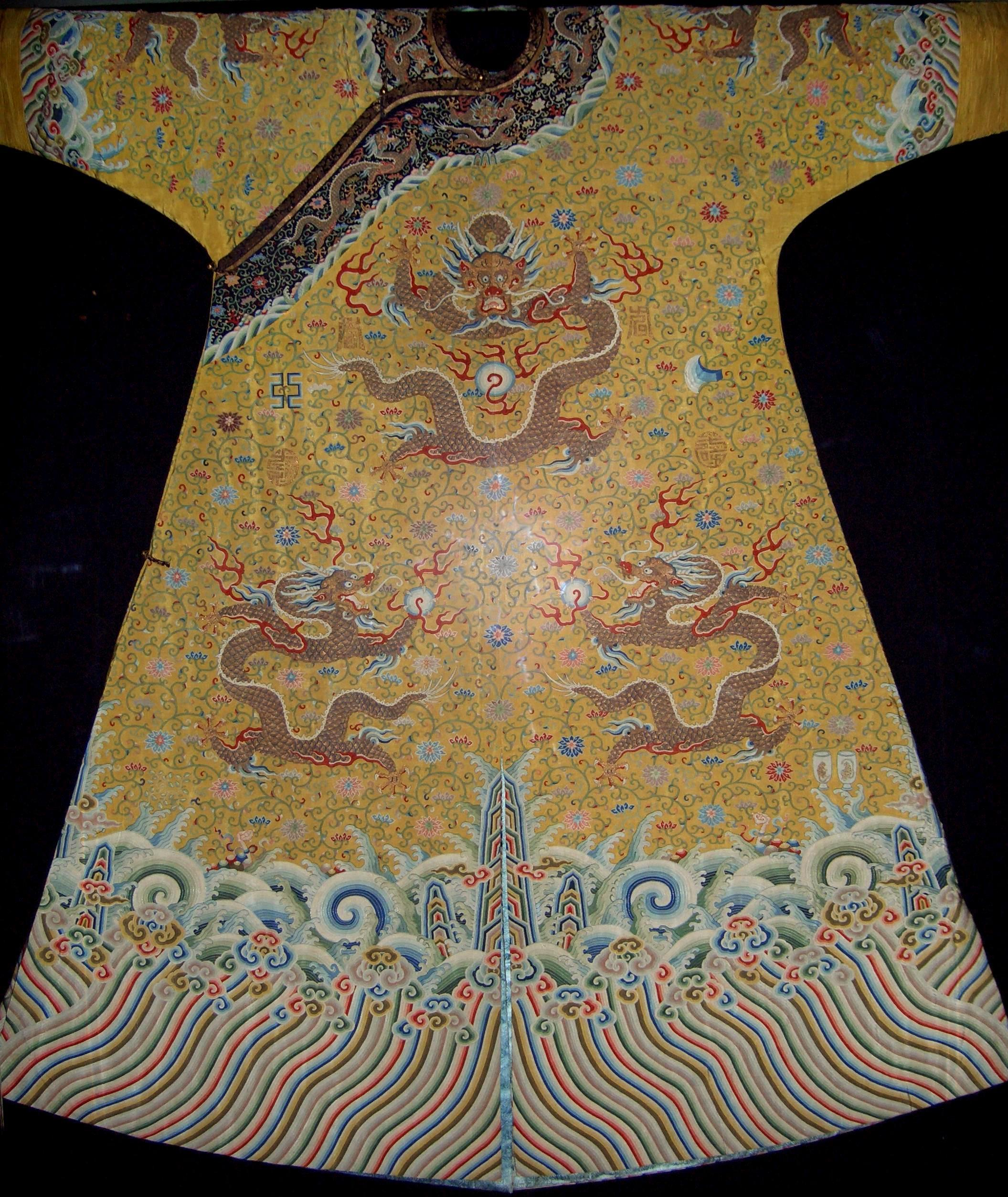
Dragon robe (jifu)

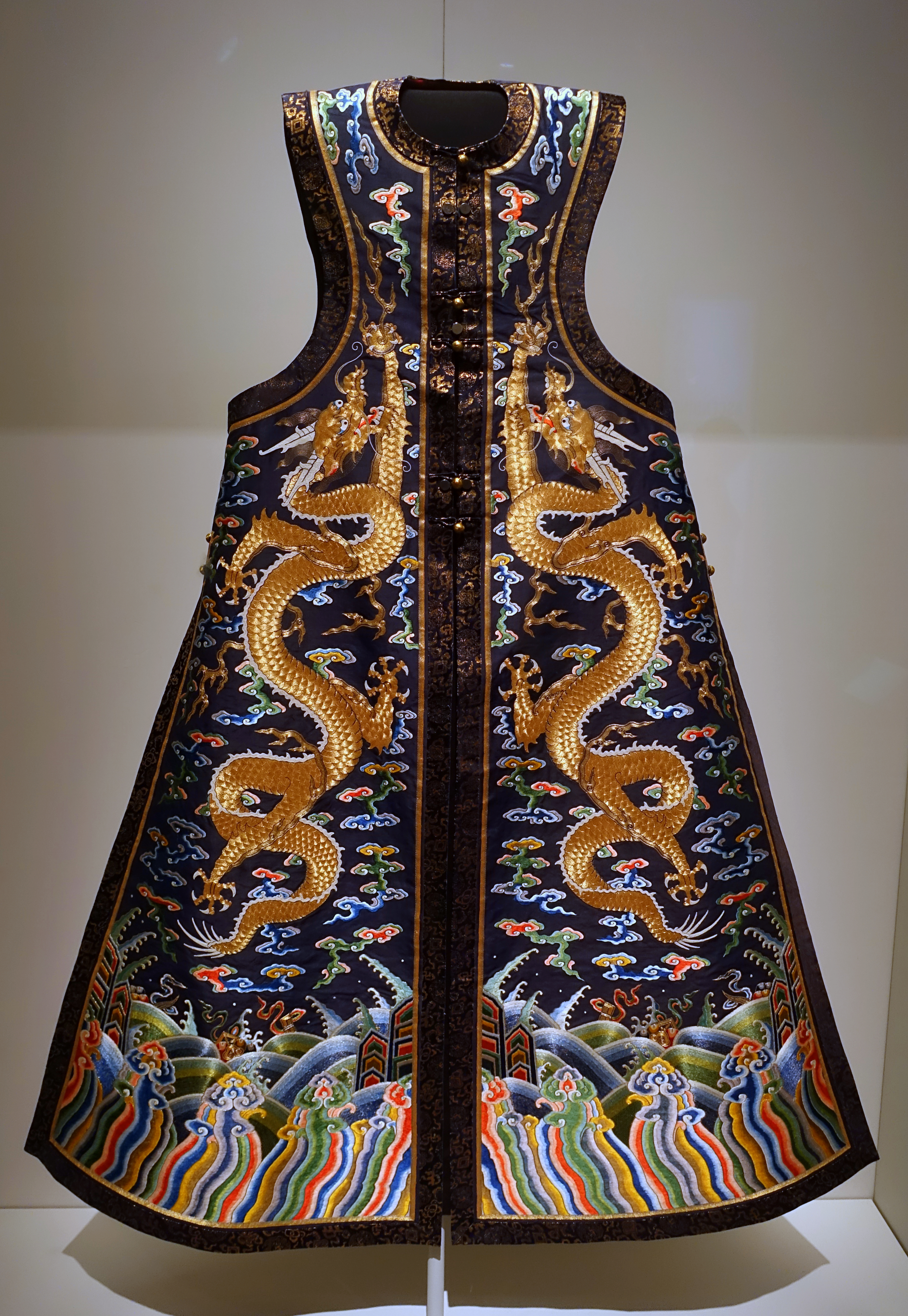
Chaogua

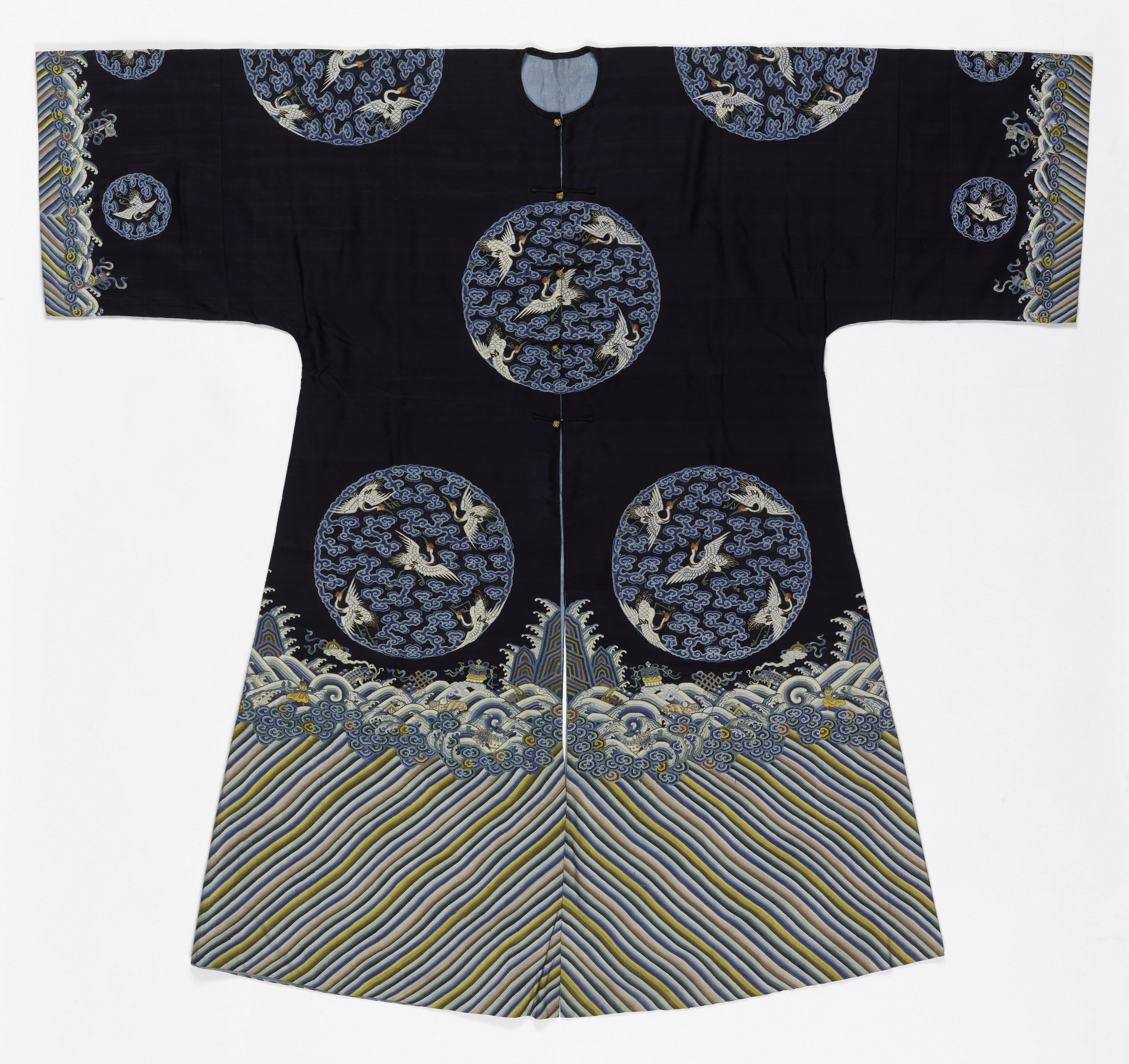
Woman's surcoat (jifugua), late 19th century

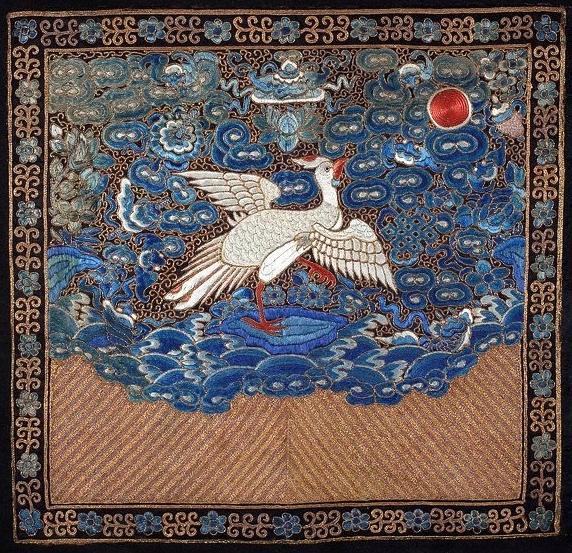
Qing dynasty mandarin square (civil official)

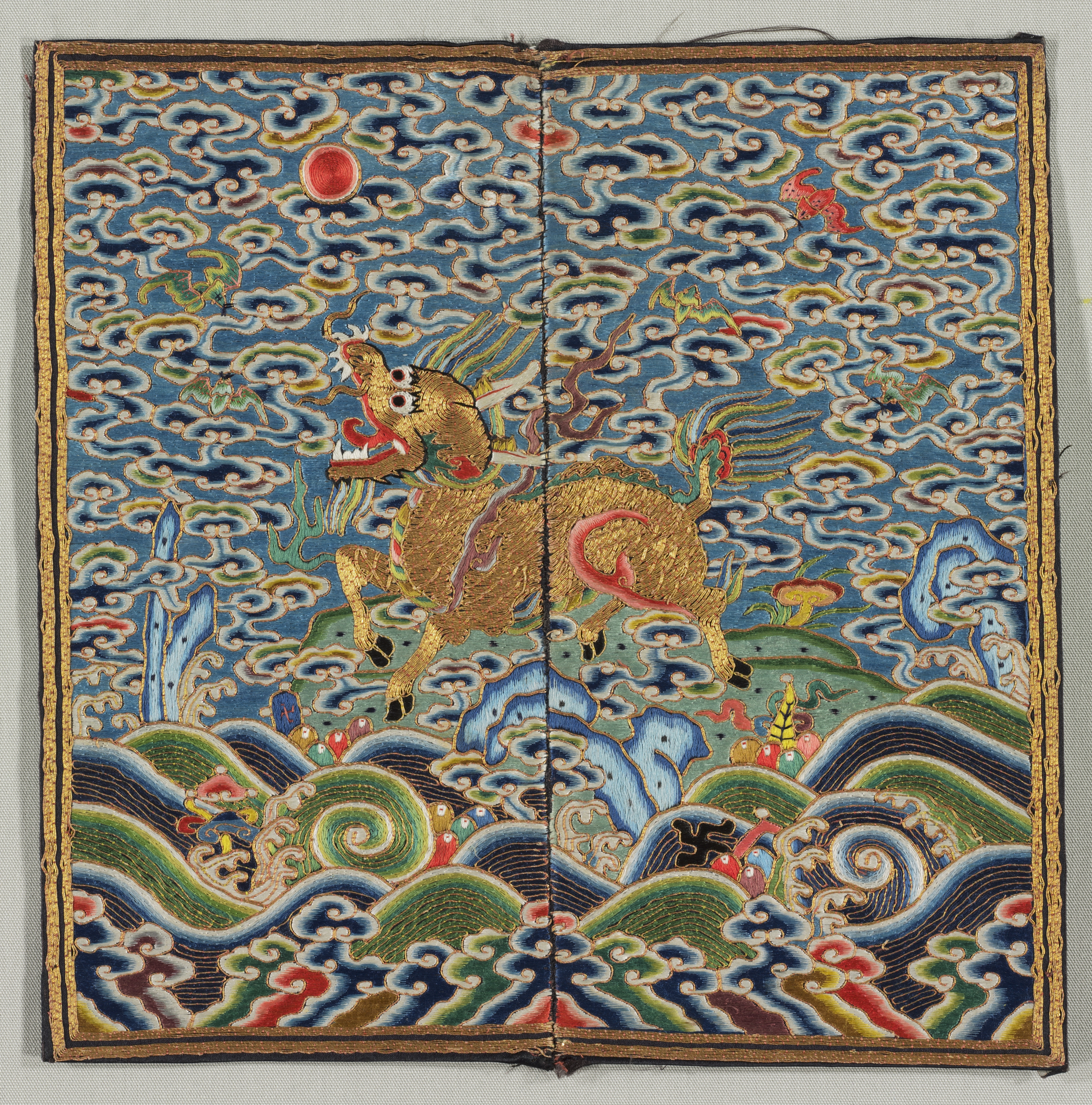
Qing dynasty mandarin square (military official)

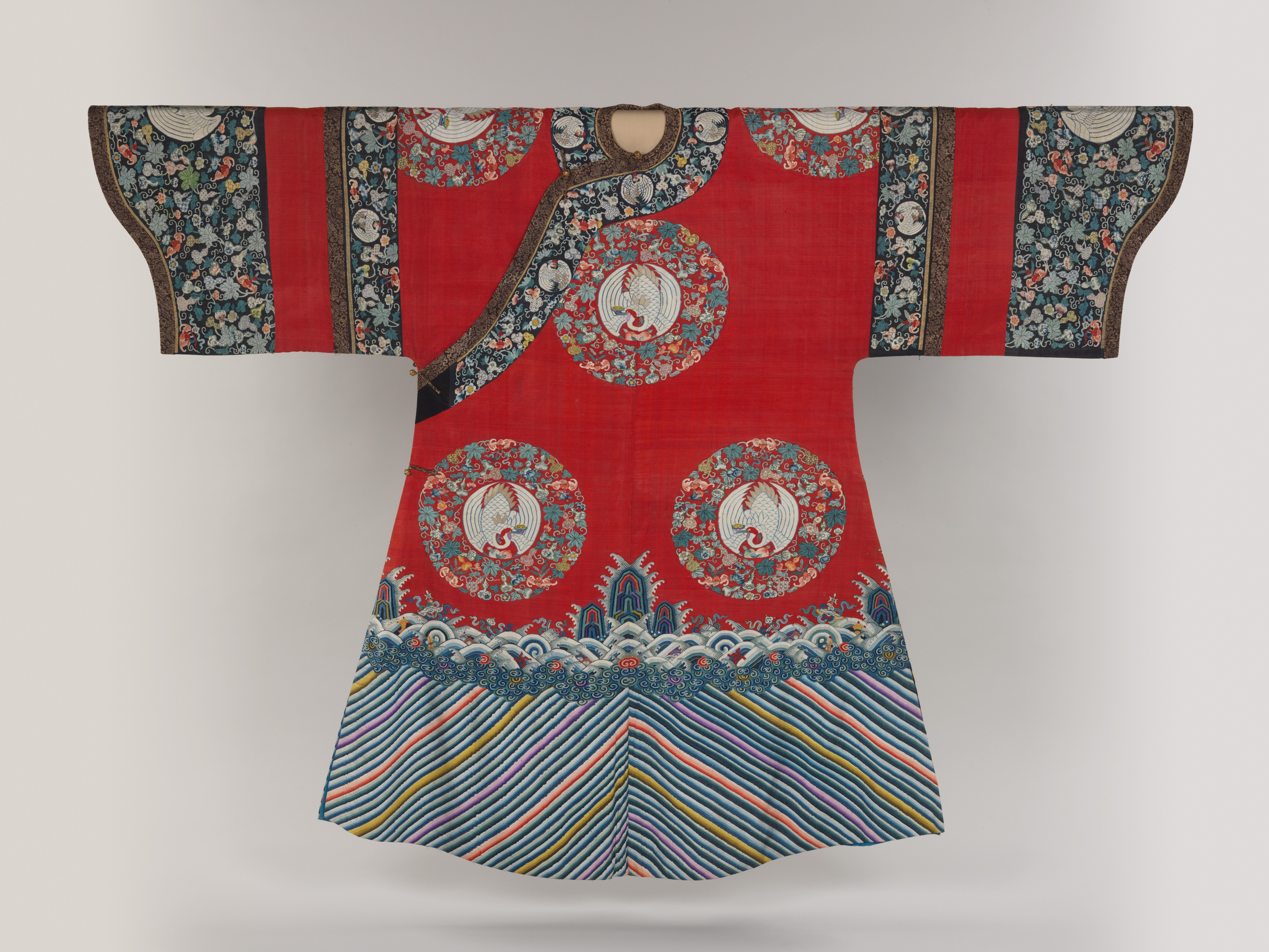
Jifupao, 19th century

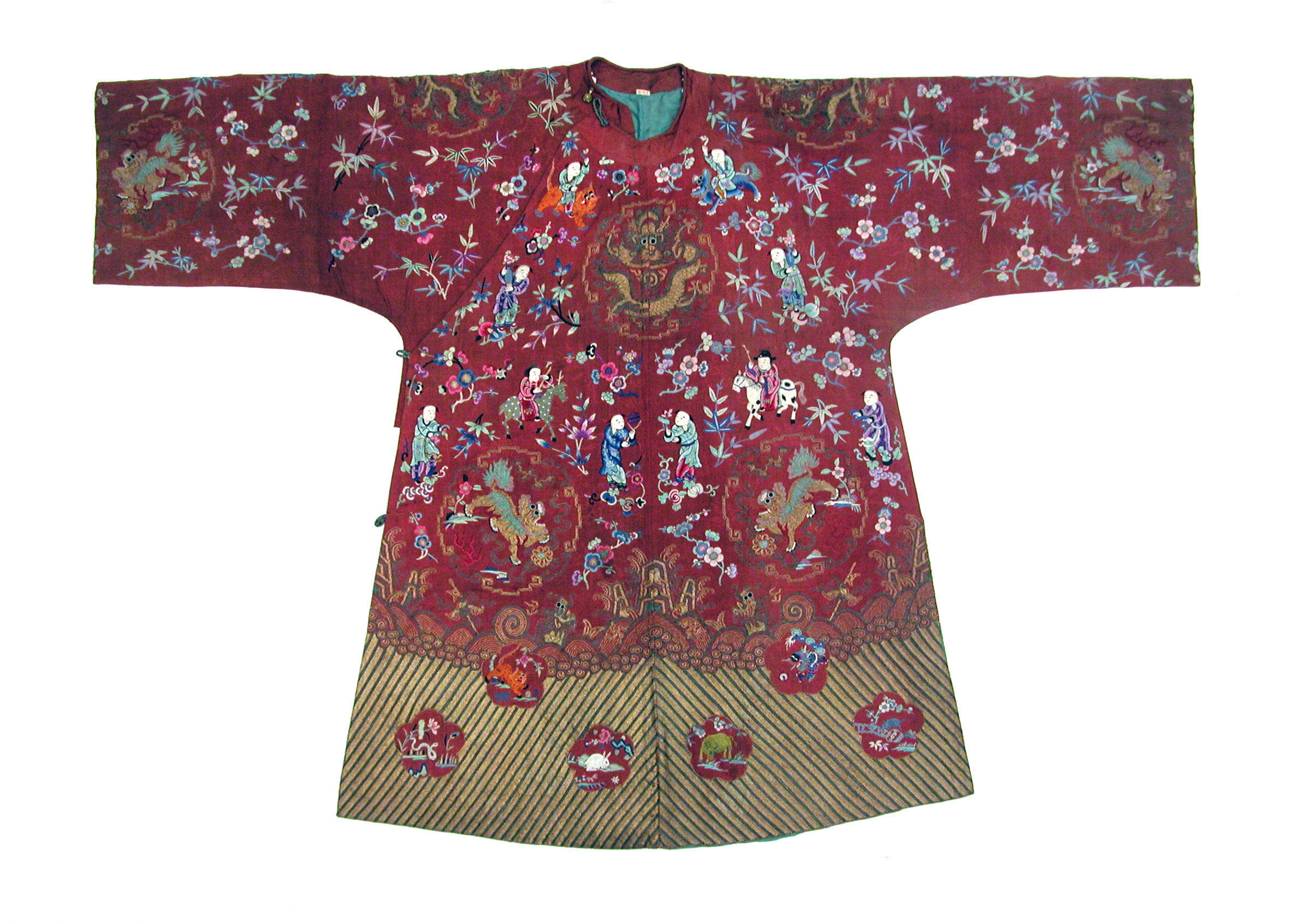
Han Chinese woman's wedding yuanlingshan decorated with golden lishui

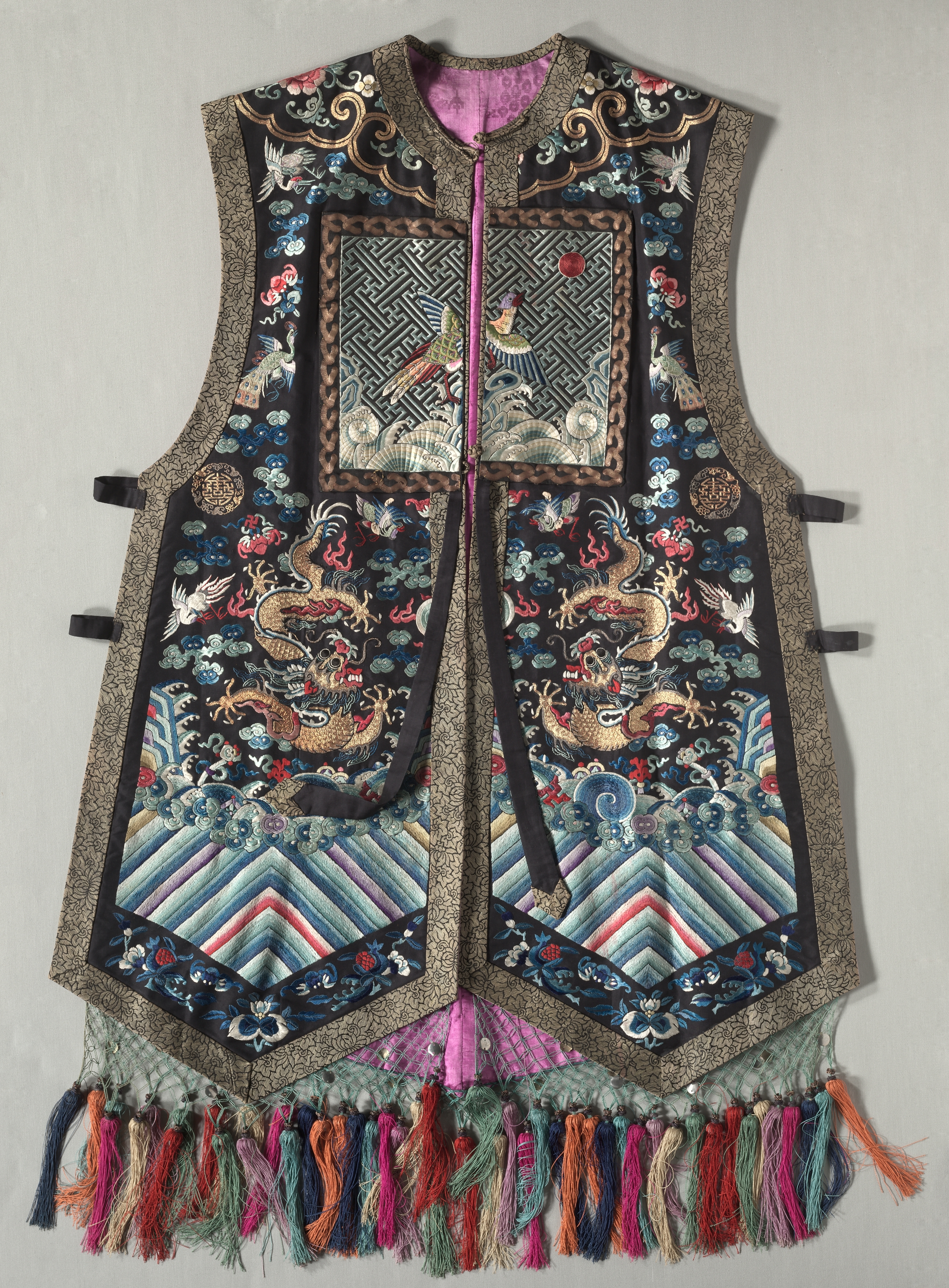
Xiapei, Qing dynasty

In the early years of the Republic of China, lishui also appeared in the official clothing regulations promulgated by Yuan Shikai for the officials who participated in 1914 Sacrifice at the Temple of Heaven ceremony when he proclaimed the beginning of a new dynasty.

=== Chinese opera ===
Lishui is used to decorate the hem of Chinese opera costumes, such as mang, nümang, long jianyi, long magua.

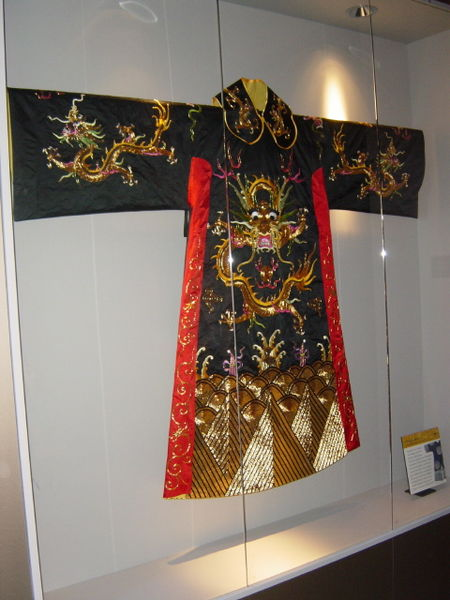

== Influences and derivatives ==
=== Vietnam ===
Lishui, among many other decorative patterns, were also adopted in some court clothing of the Nguyen dynasty under the influence of the Qing dynasty. They were sometimes used to decorate the áo nhật bình.

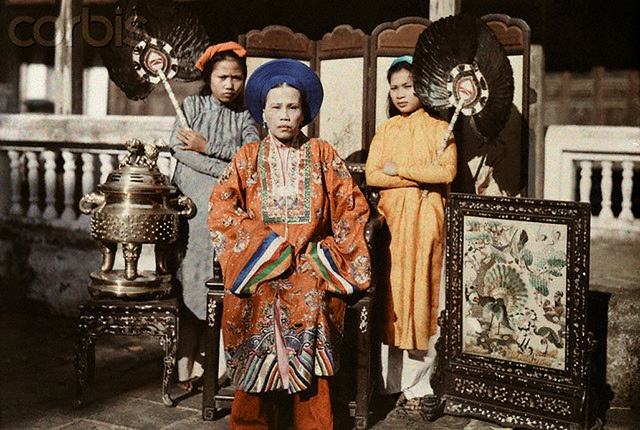
áo nhật bình (middle) with lishui, Nguyen dynasty

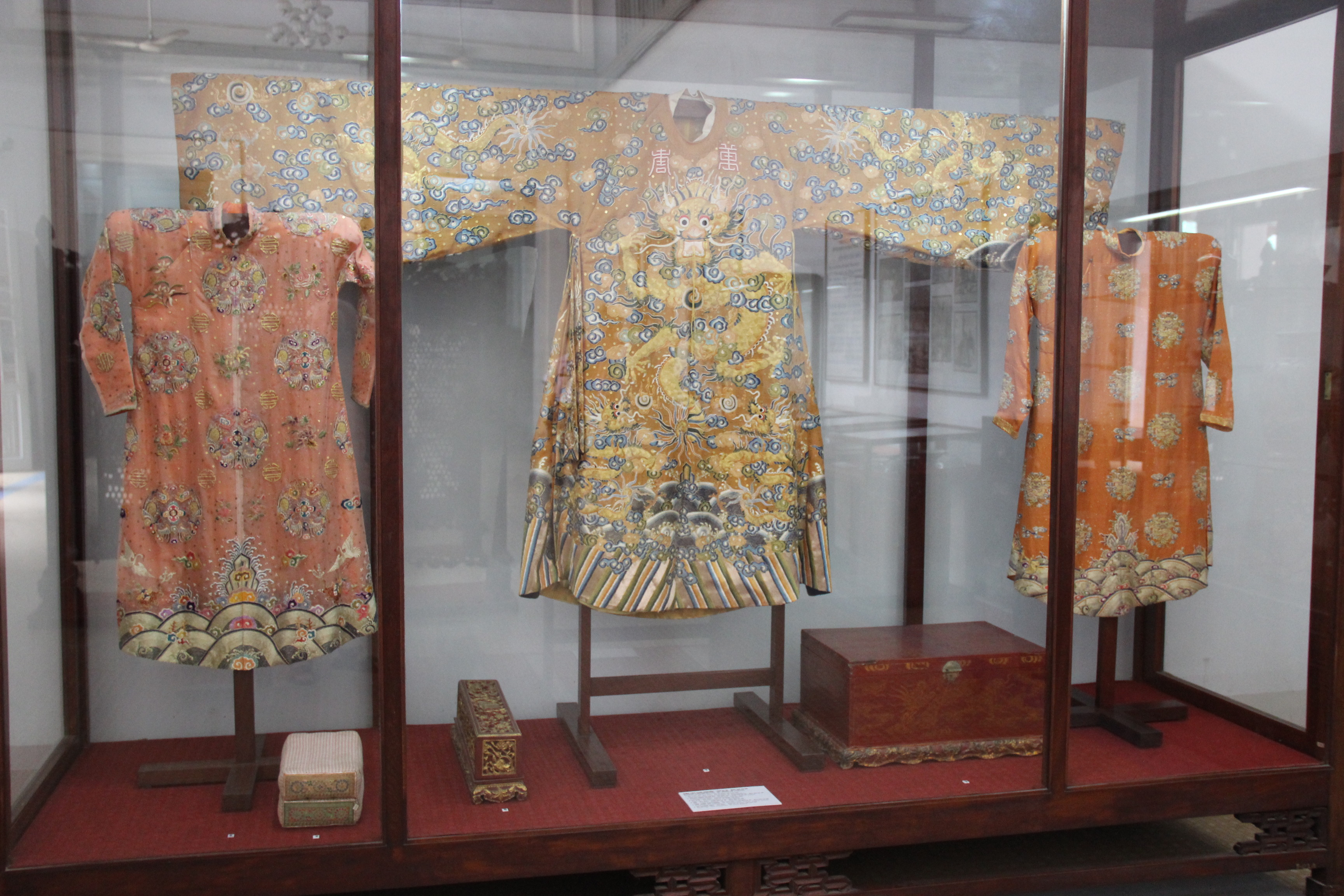
Nguyen dynasty court dress: left and right only have woshui; middle have both woshui and lishui patterns.

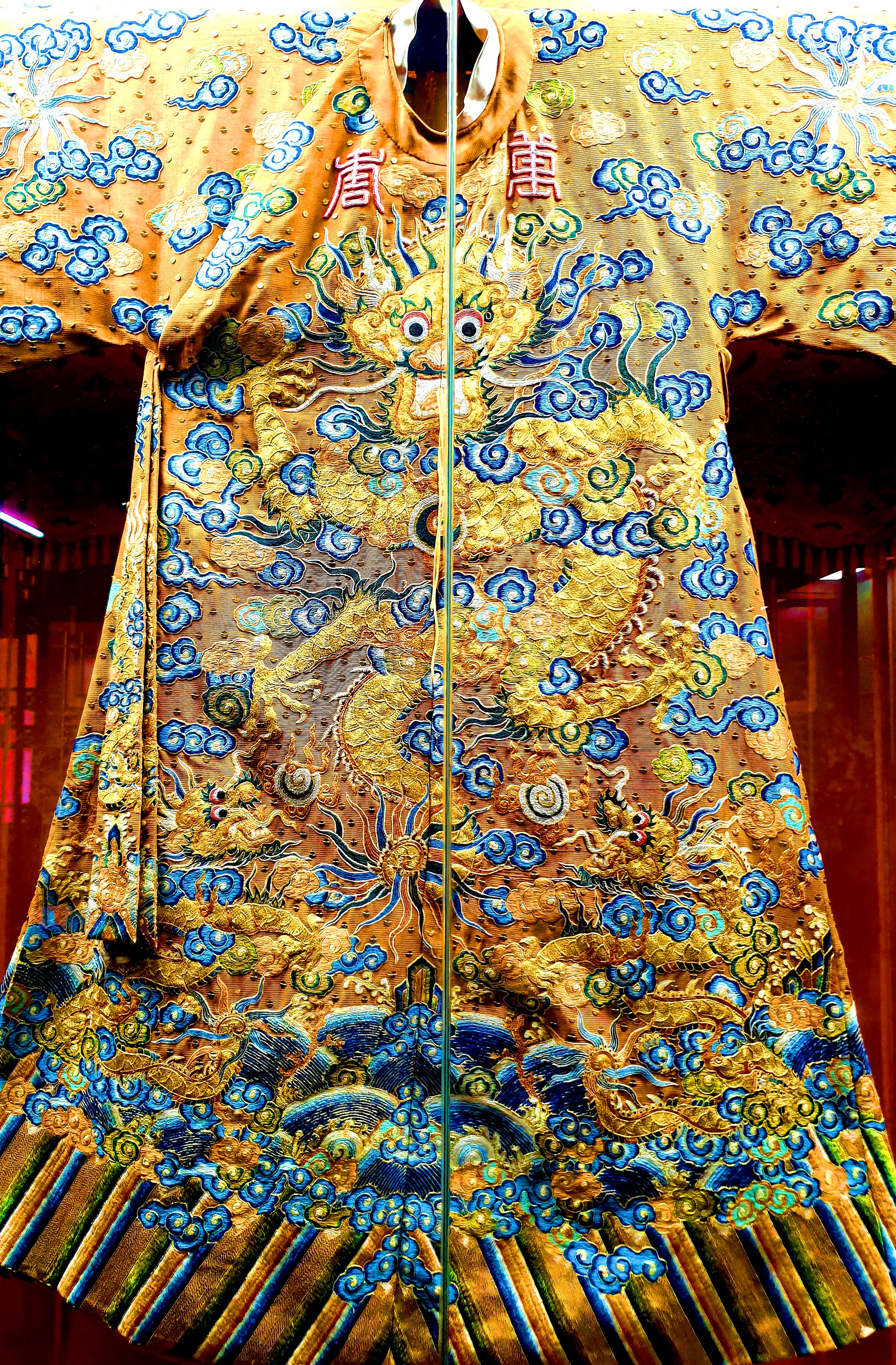
Nguyen dynasty dragon robe

== Not to be confused with ==
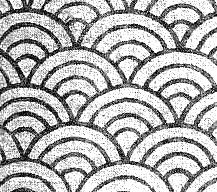
Seigaiha (青海波) – a traditional Japanese motif

== See also ==
- Hanfu - Traditional Han Chinese costume
- Qizhuang - Traditional Manchu clothing
- Twelve Ornaments
- Chinese ornamental gold silk
