= Governor (China) =

In China, the governor (Chinese: 省长; pinyin: shěngzhǎng) is the head of government of a province. There are currently 22 provincial governors. In the five autonomous regions, the official title of the analogous head of the provincial government is chairman.

== Source of talent ==
Most if not all governors are not local to the provinces they are appointed to govern.

In many cases, they are from outside the province and are graduates of the Central Party School of the Chinese Communist Party or CCP affiliated education institutions. Most governors were deputy governors, bureaucrats in central government offices or officials from others departments of the CCP such as the Communist Youth League.

Some governors have been rotated from other provinces from poorer provinces to richer coastal provinces. Other previous governors have been appointed positions within the central government. Some previous governors have become party chiefs of their respective provinces.
