= Han Chinese Eight Banners =

- Active: 1642–1928
- Country: Qing dynasty Beiyang government
- Type: Infantry, Cavalry, Artillery, Navy
- Part of: Han Chinese Banner Commanders
- Garrison/HQ: Beijing, Guangzhou, Fuzhou, Xi'an, Hangzhou, Northeast China, Chengdu, Nanjing, Baoding, Yinchuan
- Engagements: Qing conquest of the Ming

Commanders
- Notable commanders: Third-class Viscount Li Yongfang; Second-class Viscount Tong Yangxing; Third-class Viscount Shi Tingzhu; Prince of Pingnan Shang Kexi; Prince of Jingnan Geng Zhongming; Zu Dashou; Third-class Light Chariot Lieutenant Hong Chengchou

Insignia
- Military banners: Upper Three Banners: Bordered Yellow Banner; Plain Yellow Banner; Plain White Banner; Lower Five Banners: Plain Red Banner; Bordered White Banner; Bordered Red Banner; Plain Blue Banner; Bordered Blue Banner

Han Chinese Eight Banners

Chinese name
- Traditional Chinese: 漢軍八旗
- Simplified Chinese: 汉军八旗
Transcriptions
Standard Mandarin
- Hanyu Pinyin: hànjūn bāqí
Yue: Cantonese
- Yale Romanization: hon gwān baat kèih
- Jyutping: hon3 gwan1 baat3 kei4

Mongolian name
- Mongolian Cyrillic: Хятад найман хошуу

Manchu name
- Manchu script: ᡠᠵᡝᠨ ᠴᠣᠣᡥᠠᡳ ᡤᡡᠰᠠ
- Abkai: ujen qouhai gvsa
- Möllendorff: ujen coohai gūsa

Han Chinese Eight Banners, alternatively Han Eight Banners or Chinese Eight Banners (Chinese: 汉军八旗 / 漢軍八旗, romanized: hànjūn bāqí), transliterated as Ujen Cooha (Manchu: ᡠᠵᡝᠨ ᠴᠣᠣᡥᠠ / ᡠᠵᡝᠨ ᠴᠣᠣᡥᠠᡳ ᡤᡡᠰᠠ, romanized: ujen cooha / ujen coohai gūsa (Note: The Chinese term means "heavy troops" or "heavy artillery troops".)) from Manchu language, originally called Eight Banners Han Army, (Note: Although the Eight Banners system comprised Manchu, Mongol, and Han Chinese divisions, totaling "twenty-four banners," administratively they were grouped as "three banners as one," not operating independently. Thus, in the Qing dynasty (especially in its early period), the official term was "Eight Banners Han Army," with "Eight Banners" preceding the ethnic designation. By the late Qing, the term "Han Chinese Eight Banners" became a customary name and has been used since.) and commonly referred to as the Han Army, Han Army Banner Division or the Han-martial Eight Banners, were hereditary military units, and later honorary posts of Han Chinese ethnicity within the Eight Banners of the Qing dynasty. The Han Chinese Eight Banners formed a key component of the dynasty's Eight Banner system, and its members were known as Hanjun (Chinese: 漢軍; pinyin: hànjūn), or Han Army bannermen. Most descendants of Han Chinese Bannermen, alongside other members of the Eight Banners but with Han Chinese ethnicity such as Cigu Niru and Banner slaves, were redefined as part of "Manchu ethnicity" by the People's Republic of China during the period of redefination of ethnic identification policy.

== Description ==
Members were originally inhabitants of Liaodong (modern Liaoning) in the Ming dynasty, conquered during the transition from Ming to Qing by Nurhaci, who formed separate units for Chinese speakers called Nikan (Manchu: ᠨᡳᡴᠠ, romanized: nikan), who fought under black banners. Over time, membership expanded to also include inhabitants from the newly conquered regions of China.

The Han Chinese Eight Banners originated primarily from Han Chinese populations within the early Manchu Eight Banners, initially holding a lower status. During the Chongde era, their expertise in casting and operating artillery led Emperor Hong Taiji to organize them into separate banners, establishing their role as the "artillery corps" within the Eight Banners. Beyond artillery skills, the Han Chinese Eight Banners had inherent advantages in terrain familiarity, intelligence gathering, and persuading defections, making them the vanguard in the Qing conquest of China. By the mid-Qing, as the Eight Banners population grew, livelihood issues emerged, prompting the Qing court to mandate that the most recently integrated Han Chinese bannermen—those who joined after the conquest— exit the Eight Banners to alleviate resource pressures. Only the pre-conquest Liaodong "Old Han Army" remained. By the late Qing, ethnic distinctions within the banners blurred, and Han Chinese bannermen were increasingly assimilated into Manchu culture.

== History ==
=== Formation of Separate Banners ===
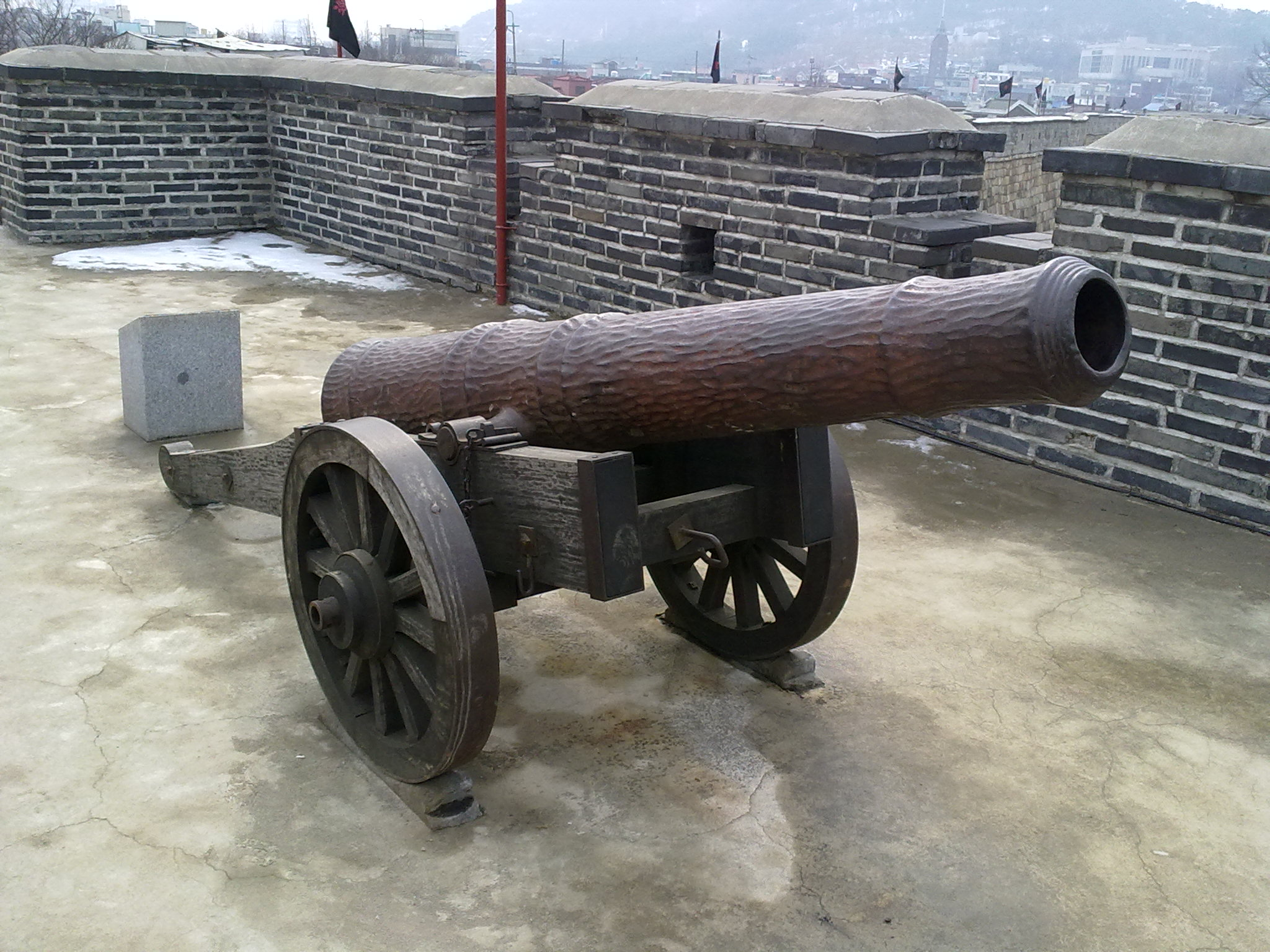
Red Cannon.

The Han Chinese Eight Banners primarily originated from individuals who voluntarily surrendered or were captured by the Later Jin and its successor, the Qing dynasty, in Liaodong, predominantly Han Chinese, with a small number of Sinicized Jurchens and Mongols who had served in the Ming administration. Initially, they were incorporated into the Manchu Eight Banners with relatively low status due to harsh policies under Nurhaci. After Hong Taiji ascended the throne, efforts were made to improve their status, with the creation of the Han Army being a key manifestation.

Before 1631 (Tiancong 5), the Later Jin lacked artillery, facing significant challenges in siege warfare. That year, Hong Taiji, leveraging the expertise of Wang Tianxiang, captured during the Yongping campaign, ordered the casting of red cannons and established the first Han Army banner, marked by a green banner, led by prince-consort Tong Yangxing, known as the "heavy troops". The term "heavy troops" in Manchu reflected their role in casting and managing artillery, establishing the Han Army as the Eight Banners' "heavy artillery corps". The importance of artillery elevated the Han Army's status.

In 1637 (Chongde 2), the Han Army expanded to two banners, retaining green banners. By 1639, it grew to four banners with colors of plain green with yellow, white, red, and plain green borders. During the one-, two-, and four-banner phases, Han Army personnel remained under the Manchu banner division, with colors used to distinguish troop types. In 1642 (Chongde 7), following the victory in the Battle of Song-Jin, surrendered personnel from this battle and the earlier Dalinghe campaign were organized into companies, forming the Han Chinese Eight Banners with the same colors as the Manchu Eight Banners, granting them independent banner status.

=== Role in the Qing Conquest ===
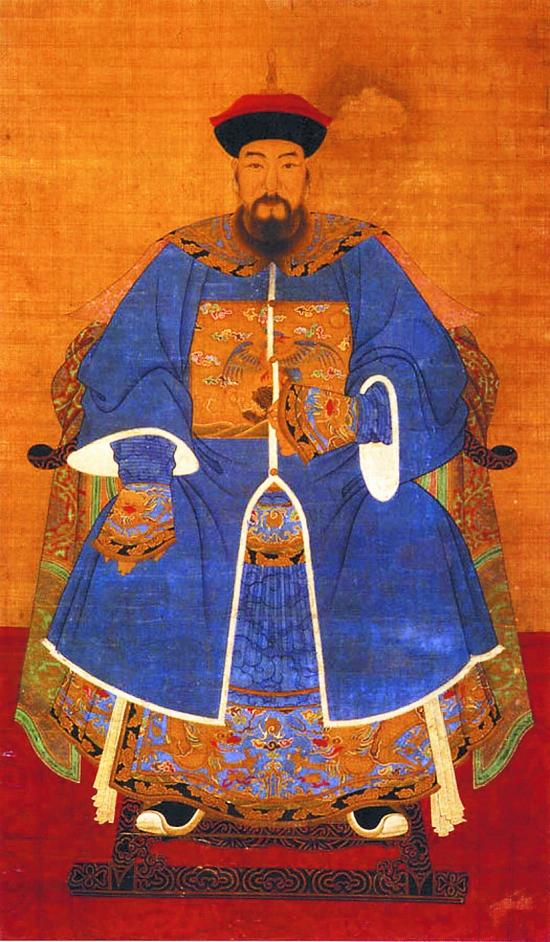
Former Ming Grand Secretary and Minister of War Hong Chengchou, incorporated into the Han Chinese Bordered Yellow Banner, played a significant role in the Qing conquest of China.

In 1631 the first separate Han artillery corps was formed by Hong Taiji, and later created the first two Banners in 1637, another four in 1639, finally reaching eight in 1642, two years before the conquest of Beijing in 1644. The colors were the same as the Manchu banners: Yellow, White, Red and Blue; with each one having a "bordered" version in red, excepting the Red Banner, whose border was white.

After the Qing began their conquest of China in 1644, the numbers of the Han Banners swelled with Chinese defectors. According to the capital banner lists, in 1720, nearing the end of the Kangxi reign, the Hanjun population under arms in Beijing exceeded Manchus and Mongols combined, at around 197,000 compared to 148,000 and 42,000, respectively.

The Han Chinese Eight Banners played an important role in Qing conquest of Ming. After that Qing dynasty started governing the whole China. After this period being admitted into the Han Chinese Eight Banners (Chinese: 擡旗) became an honor for ordinary Han Chinese people.

During the latter half of the 17th century, some members of the Han Chinese Eight Banners were required to leave it. This was known as "Hanjun Chuqi" in Chinese (Chinese: 漢軍出旗).

The Han Chinese Eight Banners were pivotal in the Qing conquest of China. Their familiarity with the terrain and intelligence on enemy movements gave them an edge over the Manchu Eight Banners after entering the pass. Facing millions of anti-Qing forces, the Han Army demonstrated superior combat effectiveness, becoming the vanguard in campaigns across the south and west. In siege warfare and mountainous southern regions, where Manchu cavalry was less effective, the Han Army became the primary force.

The Han Army also managed the newly incorporated Han Chinese forces, known as the Green Standard Army. As ethnic tensions intensified post-conquest, direct Manchu control over these forces often led to resistance or re-defection. The Qing rulers either appointed Han Army officers to lead the Green Standard Army or integrated former Ming officers into the Han Army to command their original units. This approach ensured control while maximizing combat effectiveness.

The direct employment of Han Army talent was critical in weakening anti-Qing resistance, demonstrating that surrender could lead to significant roles, as seen with Hong Chengchou, whose strategies in the southwest turned the tide. As Qing campaigns extended south, Manchu forces became stretched, making the Han Army a key component of garrison forces, often mixed with Manchu and Mongol banners. After the suppression of the Three Feudatories, Han Army troops were stationed in coastal provinces like Fujian and Guangdong.

Post-conquest, the Han Army stabilized the Qing regime by helping Manchu rulers adapt to Chinese conditions, drawing on Ming institutions. Figures like Fan Wencheng, Ning Wanwo, Zhang Cunren, and Hong Chengchou served as "special advisors," influencing the emperor and Manchu nobility on political, economic, military, cultural, and ethnic matters, except for Manchu privileges. To govern the mainland, the Qing created Han Army-specific positions, with many governors and viceroys being Han Army members. Amid sharp ethnic tensions, the Han Army acted as a buffer, balancing Manchu privileges with policies tolerable to the Han Chinese. Scholars argue that without the Han Army's support, the Qing might not have secured and stabilized control over China. As the Qing regime stabilized and Manchu rulers gained experience, the Han Army's role diminished.

Notable Han Army families, such as those of Li Yongfang, Fan Wencheng, Tong Yangxing, Shi Tingzhu, Shang Kexi, Geng Zhongming, Shen Zhixiang, Zhang Dayou, Bao Chengxian, Zu Dashou, Ma Guangyuan, Cai Shiying (1675), Sun Degong, Wang Shixuan (1661), Zuo Menggeng, and Shi Lang, were ennobled for their contributions. The "Shang, Geng, Shi, Li, Tong, Zu, Cai, Wang" families are known as the "Eight Great Han Army Surnames". Despite their generally lower status compared to Manchu and Mongol banners, especially after the mid-Qing abolition of Han Army-specific positions, these families enjoyed high treatment, with descendants occasionally appointed to Manchu positions due to their merit.

== Military Campaigns ==
They participated in the Second Joseon Campaign (1636–1637), the Liaoxi campaign (1638–1642)

== The end of the system ==
In the middle of the 18th century, the Manchu Banners were in a problematic financial state.

=== Mid-Qing Exodus ===
By the late Kangxi era, population growth within the Eight Banners led to livelihood issues. One solution was to mandate that less senior Han Army members exit the Eight Banners. These individuals, often retaining strong Han Chinese customs, were viewed differently by Qing rulers. In 1742 (Qianlong 7), Emperor Qianlong ordered the exodus of post-conquest Han Army members, including those from the Three Feudatories, sparing the pre-conquest Liaodong "Old Han Army". In 1723 (Yongzheng 1), the Han Army and Han bondservants totaled over 440,000, about 72% of the Eight Banners population. By 1796 (Jiaqing 1), after the exodus, this dropped to 43%, reflecting the scale of the policy.

=== Assimilation into Manchu Identity ===
After the exodus, the remaining Han Army, mostly descendants of the Old Han Army, had largely assimilated into Manchu culture, adopting Manchu customs and language. French missionary Joachim Bouvet referred to them as "Tartarized Chinese" in his work L'Empereur Kangxi. By the late Qianlong era, the Qing-compiled National History Biographies included Han Army figures in the Manchu Eminent Ministers Biographies. By the late Qing, distinctions between Manchu, Mongol, and Han Army banners had largely vanished, fostering a shared bannerman identity. In the Republic era, most Han Army descendants identified as Manchu and were no longer seen as Han Chinese by the Han population. Calling them Han Chinese based on their ancestry could cause offense. The descendants of Shang Kexi, who used the Manchu surname Shageda, are a notable example. Recent media reports have highlighted their Manchu identity. Descendants of Chang Yuchun, a Ming dynasty founder, also identified as Manchu under the Plain White Banner.

== Ambiguities ==
In the Eight Banners system, bondservant organizations' military units were sometimes referred to as "Han Army," such as Bondservant Han Army, Banner Drum Han Army, or Imperial Household Han Army, or simply Han Army, but these were part of the Manchu banner bondservant system, not the Han Chinese Eight Banners.

== See also ==
- Identity in the Eight Banners

== Bibliography ==
Books

- 杜家骥 (2008). "Bāqí yǔ qīngcháo zhèngzhì lùn gǎo" 《八旗与清朝政治论稿》 [Essays on the Eight Banners and Qing Dynasty Politics] (in Chinese). 人民出版社. ISBN 9787010067537.
- 鄂尔泰 等 (1985). "Bāqí tōng zhì chū jí" 《八旗通志初集》 [Initial Collection of the Eight Banners Gazetteer] (in Chinese). 东北师范大学出版社.
- 傅波 (2005). "Hè tú ālā yǔ mǎnzú xìngshì jiāpǔ yánjiū" 《赫图阿拉与满族姓氏家谱研究》 [Hetuala and Manchu Surname Genealogy Studies] (in Chinese). 辽宁民族出版社. ISBN 9787807220091.
- 金启孮 (2009). "Jīnqǐcóng tán běijīng de mǎnzú" 《金启孮谈北京的满族》 [Jin Qicong on Beijing's Manchus] (in Chinese). 中华书局. ISBN 9787101068566.
- 刘小萌 (2008). "Qīng dài bāqí zǐdì" 《清代八旗子弟》 [Qing Dynasty Eight Banners Descendants] (in Chinese). 辽宁民族出版社. ISBN 9787807225638.
- 傅恒 等 奉清高宗御敕 撰 (1986). "Jǐng yìn wén yuān gé sì kù quánshū·jīng bù èr'èrliù·xiǎoxué lèi·yù zhì zēngdìng qīngwén jiàn" 《景印文渊阁四库全书·经部二二六·小学类·御制增订清文鉴》 [Imperial Revised Manchu Dictionary, Wenyuange Siku Quanshu Edition] (in Chinese). 台湾商务印书馆.
- 张佳生 (2008). "Bāqí shí lùn" 《八旗十论》 [Ten Essays on the Eight Banners] (in Chinese). 辽宁民族出版社. ISBN 9787807226093.
- 赵尔巽 等 (1998). "Qīngshǐ gǎo" 《清史稿》 [Draft History of Qing] (in Chinese). 中华书局. ISBN 9787101007503.
- 昭梿 (1980). "Xiào tíng zá lù" 《啸亭杂录》 [Xiaoting Miscellaneous Records] (in Chinese). 中华书局. ISBN 9787101017519.
- 中国社会科学院近代史研究所政治史研究室, ed. (2011). "Qīng dài mǎn hàn guānxì yánjiū" 《清代满汉关系研究》 [Studies on Manchu-Han Relations in the Qing Dynasty] (in Chinese). 社会科学文献出版社. ISBN 9787101017519.

Journal articles

- 陈佳华; 傅克东 (1981). ""Bāqí hàn jūn kǎo lüè"" 《八旗汉军考略》 [A Study of the Han Chinese Eight Banners]. 《民族研究》 (in Chinese) (5). 中国社会科学院民族研究所.
- 谢景芳 (1986). ""Qīng chū bāqí hàn jūn dì dìwèi hé zuòyòng"" 《清初八旗汉军的地位和作用》 [The Status and Role of the Han Chinese Eight Banners in the Early Qing]. 《求是学刊》 (in Chinese) (3). 黑龙江大学.
