= Mongol Eight Banners =

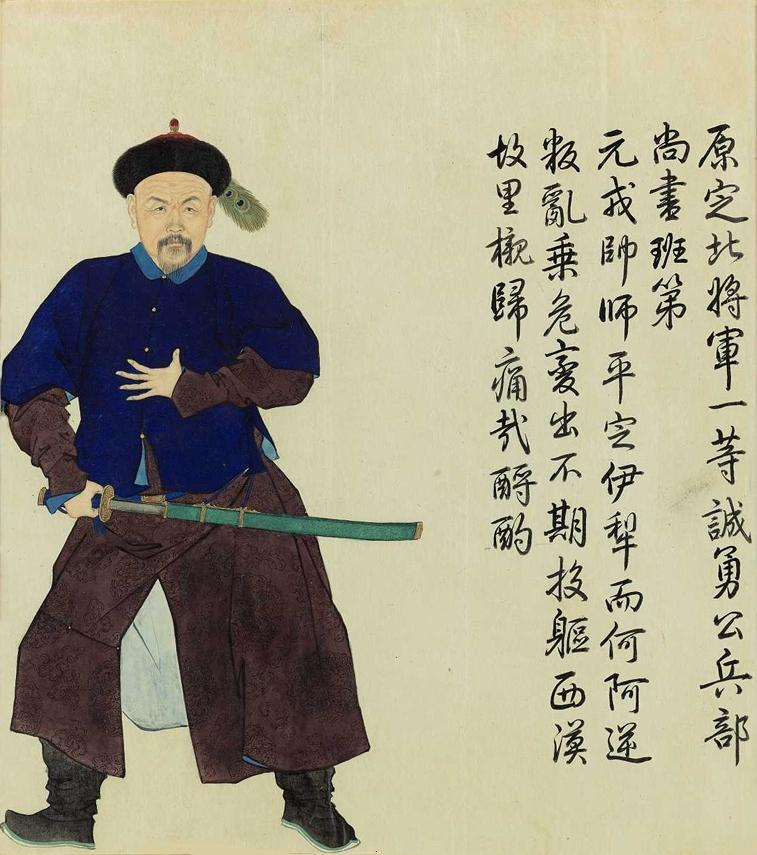
- A member of the Mongol Eight Banners depicted in a painting from the Hall of Purple Radiance
- Active: 1635-1928
- Country: Later Jin; Qing dynasty Republic of China
- Garrison/HQ: Beijing, Guangzhou, Fuzhou, Xi'an, Hangzhou, Northeast China

Insignia
- Identification symbol: Upper Three Banners: Bordered Yellow Banner; Plain Yellow Banner; Plain White Banner; Lower Five Banners: Plain Red Banner; Bordered White Banner; Bordered Red Banner; Plain Blue Banner; Bordered Blue Banner

The Mongol Eight Banners (Manchu: ᠮᠣᠩᡤᠣ
ᡤᡡᠰᠠ, monggo gūsa; Chinese: 八旗蒙古; pinyin: bāqí ménggǔ; Mongolian: Монгол найман хошуу) were hereditary military and administrative units of the Qing dynasty. Together with the Manchu Eight Banners and the Han Chinese Eight Banners, the units composed of Mongol bannermen formed the dynasty's Eight Banner system.

The Mongol Eight Banners were formally established in 1635 by Hong Taiji of the Later Jin dynasty, which was renamed the Qing dynasty the following year. Over the previous decade, as the Jurchens (later known as the Manchu people) expanded the territory of the Later Jin across the Northeast Plain, nomadic Mongol cavalrymen—particularly those of the Kharchin and Khorchin tribes, but also some Chahars—were incorporated into their ranks. Some, like the Kharchin in 1622, joined the Jurchens in large numbers as part of formal sworn alliances; others submitted to Jurchen rule in a more sporadic process, as smaller groups of Mongol nomads and their families came to recognize the Jurchen leaders as their khan.

These various Mongol groups formed the initial membership of the Mongol Eight Banners. At their founding in 1635, there were about 10,000 warriors incorporated into the Mongol Eight Banners. Like the Jurchen banners from which they separated, the Mongol Eight Banners consisted of the Plain Yellow Banner, the Bordered Yellow Banner, the Plain White Banner, the Bordered White Banner, the Plain Blue Banner, the Bordered Blue Banner, the Plain Red Banner, and the Bordered Red Banner. The Mongol Eight banners were initially subordinate to the chiefs of the Jurchen/Manchu banners of the same color.

As the Qing continued to expand over the course of the 17th century, Mongol clans that were not incorporated into the Eight Banners were eventually arranged into the Banners of Inner Mongolia, which persist as administrative units in China today. The Inner Mongolian Banners were distinct institutions and should not be confused with the Mongol Eight Banners, in which only about 20% of Mongols loyal to the Qing were enrolled. Some Mongol clans that were part of the Eight Banner system (like those of the officials Zhaohui or Qishan) were enrolled in the Manchu banners instead of their Mongol equivalents, largely due to political concerns.

The Mongol Eight Banners had the smallest population of the three ethnic divisions of the Eight Banners, constituting about 8% of all bannermen. Estimates suggest that there were around 100,000 to 200,000 men and women enrolled in the Mongol Eight Banners in 1648, with the population roughly doubling by 1720. Membership in a given banner was hereditary and followed the patrilineal line.

Following their participation in the Qing conquest, members of the Mongol Eight Banners were stationed in banner garrisons, the largest of which was the imperial capital of Beijing. Like all bannermen under the Qing, members received government stipends and enjoyed special legal privileges that set them apart from the civilian population. Many distinguished themselves in campaigns against the Dzungar Khanate or held civil office in the imperial bureaucracy. Because of their relatively small population, the quotas for Mongol bannermen in the imperial examinations were even more generous than those given to the Manchus, and far more generous than those allocated to Han Bannermen. Mongol participation in the Qing project was considered essential to the Manchu leaders of the dynasty, who were interested in presenting themselves as successors to Genghis Khan. Accordingly, noblemen in the Mongol Eight Banners participated in Manchu shamanic rituals of the Qing imperial lineage, and the Qing state patronized the publication of texts celebrating Mongol identity, like the Secret History of the Mongols.

== Prominent Members ==
- Sando (三多, 1876–1941) of the Zhongmuyi clan, a member of the Mongol Plain White Banner
- Saišangga (賽尚阿, 1798–1875) of the Alut clan, a member of the Mongol Plain Blue Banner
- Xiliang (錫良, 1853–1917), of the Bayot clan, a member of the Mongol Bordered Blue Banner
- Bandi (班第, died 1755) of the Borjigit clan, a member of the Mongol Plain Yellow Banner
- Changling (長齡, 1758–1838) of the Sartuk clan, a member of the Mongol Plain White Banner
- Songyun (松筠, 1752–1835) of the Malate clan, a member of the Mongol Plain Blue Banner
- Yan Jupeng (言菊朋, 1890–1942) of the Malate clan, a member of the Mongol Plain Blue Banner
- Quanshun (全順, died 1865) of the Sartula clan, a member of the Mongol Plain Blue Banner

== See also ==
- Identity in the Eight Banners
- Eight Banners
- Mongols in China
- Military of the Qing dynasty
