= Chong'an (prince) =

- Prince Kang of the First Rank 和碩康親王

Prince Kang of the First Rank
- Tenure: 20 June 1709 – 14 October 1733
- Predecessor: Chuntai
- Successor: Bartu
- Born: 5 September 1705
- Died: 14 October 1733 (aged 28)
- Spouse: Lady Magiya (馬佳氏)
- Issue: Yong'en; Yonghui (永㥣)
Names
- Chong'an (崇安)
Posthumous name
- Prince Kangxiu of the First Rank (康修親王)
- House: Aisin Gioro
- Father: Chuntai
- Mother: Lady Irgen Gioro (伊爾根覺羅氏)

Chong'an (Chinese: 崇安; 5 September 1705 – 14 October 1733), posthumous name Prince Kangxiu of the First Rank, was an imperial prince of the Qing dynasty of China. He was Chuntai's fourth son and a sixth-generation descendant of Daišan, Nurhaci's second son. Chong'an was the third Prince Kang of the First Rank, succeeding his father Chuntai. He was in turn succeeded to the peerage by his uncle Bartu.

== Life ==
Chong'an was born on 5 September 1705 to lady Irgen Gioro, Chuntai's secondary spouse. Chong'an inherited father's princely title on 20 June 1709, having barely been 4 years old. As a prince Kang of the First Rank, Chong'an became the general commander of the Manchu Plain Red Banner.In 1725, Chong'an and other ministers charged Yunsi with litany of 40 crimes, including attempt of usurpation of the imperial throne through creation of the "Eight Lord Party". Those accusations led to Yunsi's banishment from the imperial clan and condemnation of his supporters.

Chong'an was furthermore entrusted with affairs of the Imperial Clan Court, which happened in 1727. In 1731, Chong'an commanded the defence of Guihua city from Dzungars. When the defence failed, Chong'an was appointed as a generalissimus of Eight Banners force. Shortly after receiving the seals, Chong'an was summoned back to the capital. He died of injuries during the battle on 14 October 1733 and was posthumously honoured as Prince Kangxiu of the First Rank.

== Family ==
Chong'an was married to lady Magiya, daughter of duke Zhongda Malishan (马礼善).

- Primary consort, lady Magiya (嫡福晋马佳氏)
- Secondary consort, of the Sirin Gioro clan (侧福晋西林觉罗氏)
  - Kuifu (魁福; 15 July 1724 – 22 August 1725), first son
  - Prince Ligong of the First Rank Yong'en (永恩; 12 September 1727 – 10 April 1805), second son
- Secondary consort, of the Irgen Gioro clan (侧福晋伊尔根觉罗氏)
  - Prince Li of the First Rank Yongkui (永奎; 5 February 1729 – 28 March 1790), third son
