= Zhaolian =

- Prince Li of the First Rank 和碩禮親王

Prince Li of the First Rank
- Tenure: 3 May 1805 – 22 January 1816
- Predecessor: Yong'en
- Successor: Linzhi
- Born: 26 March 1776; Beijing
- Died: 14 January 1830 (aged 53); Beijing
- Spouse: Lady Irgen Gioro
- Issue: Xijun (錫濬)
Names
- Zhaolian (昭槤)
- House: Aisin Gioro
- Father: Yong'en
- Mother: Lady Sumuru

Zhaolian
- Traditional Chinese: 昭槤
- Simplified Chinese: 昭梿
Transcriptions
Standard Mandarin
- Hanyu Pinyin: Zhāolián

Jixiu
- Chinese: 汲修
Transcriptions
Standard Mandarin
- Hanyu Pinyin: Jíxiū

Zhaolian (26 March 1776 – 14 January 1830), courtesy name Jixiu, was a Manchu prince of the imperial Aisin Gioro clan during the Qing dynasty. A 6th-generation descendant of prince Giyesu, he was the 9th holder of the Prince Li (禮) title, which he held from 1805 to 1816. In 1816, his title was stripped after it was discovered that he tortured servants Cheng Jianzhong (程建忠), Cheng Jianyi (程建義) and others. He was put under house arrest for the subsequent 3 years and never recovered the princely title.

A bibliophile, Zhaolian was friends with famous intellectuals like Wei Yuan, Gong Zizhen, Ji Yun and Yuan Mei. His non-fiction writings on politics, government, history and literature were posthumously collected into 2 books": Xiaoting Zalu (嘯亭雜錄/啸亭雜録; "Miscellaneous Records of the Roaring Pavilion"), and Xiaoting Xulu (嘯亭續錄/啸亭续录; "Continued Records of the Roaring Pavilion").

== Family ==
Father: Yong'en (永恩), prince Ligong of the First Rank (礼恭亲王)

Mother: Lady Šumuru, Yong'en's primary consort (断福晋 舒穆禄)

Consorts and issue:

- Primary consort, Lady Irgen Gioro (嫡福晋 伊尔根觉罗氏)
  - Xirui (锡濬), Maozi's son by Lady Xia, adopted by Zhaolian

== Ancestry ==
Ancestors of Zhaolian

Chuntai
Chong'an
Lady Irgen Gioro, Secondary consort
Yong'en
Lady Sirin Gioro, Secondary consort
Zhaolian
Lady Šumuru, Primary consort
