= Identity in the Eight Banners =

Identity in China was strongly dependent on the Eight Banner system during the Manchu-led Qing dynasty (1644–1912). China consisted of multiple ethnic groups, of which the Han, Mongols and Manchus participated in the banner system. Identity, however, was defined much more by culture, language and participation in the military (the Eight Banners) until the Qianlong Emperor resurrected the ethnic classifications.

== Eight Banners ==
The Eight Banners represented military organisation and served as the primary organisational structure of Manchu (Jurchen) society. The banner armies gradually evolved over time to include members from non-Jurchen/Manchu ethnic groups such as the Mongols and Han Chinese. There were three main types of banners: Manchus of Eight Banners (八旗滿洲; bāqímǎnzhōu), Mongols of Eight Banners (八旗蒙古; bāqíménggǔ) and Han Army of Eight Banners (八旗漢軍; bāqíhànjūn).

Beginning in the late 1620s, the Jurchens started incorporating Mongol tribes, which they either conquered or were allied with, into the Eight Banners system. The Han Chinese who first joined the Eight Banners were replacements for Jurchen soldiers in existing banners who were killed in battle. However, over time, as more Han soldiers joined the banners, the Jurchens decided to form a separate group for them. This group, known as the "Old Han Army" (舊漢軍; jiù hànjūn), was mainly used as infantry support. In 1631, a separate Han artillery corps was formed. Four more Han banners were created in 1639. By 1642, the full eight Han banners were established.

The Han banners were known as "Nikan" (Manchu: ᠨᡳᡴᠠᠨ, means "Han ethnicity"), Banners and were composed of a large number of Han prisoners-of-war and defectors. Since many of these Han men were single, they married Jurchen women. Over time, there were more and more Han Chinese joining the banners, such that they started to outnumber the Jurchens. The Han Chinese and Jurchens in Liaodong (part of present-day Liaoning Province) started mixing their cultures. Many bannermen forged genealogies for themselves or decided whether to join a Jurchen or Han banner.

The Eight Banners were then created from the old Han and Jurchen banners, which were given equal status. The Mongol banners were also created around this time. Anyone who was not sorted into either a Han or Mongol banner became Manchu, an ethnic group named by Huangtaiji.

== Ethnicity ==
The three principal ethnic groups in the Later Jin society were the Manchus, Han and Mongols. The country had many other smaller ethnic groups, such as the Xibe, Daur, Russians, Nanai and Evenks (such as Solon). Prior to the Qing dynasty, each group had a significantly distinct culture and language/dialect.

== Identity ==
During the Qing dynasty (1644–1912), bannermen and civilians were categorised into ethnic groups based on language, culture, behaviour and way of life. Men were grouped into Manchu and Han banners on the basis of their culture and language. The Qing government regarded Han bannermen and the Han civilian population as distinct.

Some descendants of sinicised Jurchens spoke the Han language and had served under the Ming Empire (1368–1644). On the other hand, some ethnic Jurchens actually had Han ancestry but had defected to the Jurchen side, assimilated into Jurchen culture, and lived among the Jurchens in present-day Jilin Province before 1618.

=== Han and Jurchen assimilation ===
==== Pre-1618 ====
Han Chinese who deserted the Ming Empire and moved to Nurgan (in present-day Jilin Province) before 1618 and assimilated with the Jurchens were known as transfrontiermen. They adopted Jurchen culture, spoke the Jurchen language, and became part of the Manchu banners.

The Jianzhou Jurchen Khanate led by Nurhaci, the founder of the Qing dynasty, classified people as Jurchen or nikan (Han). Those who were considered Jurchen adopted a Jurchen lifestyle, spoke the Jurchen language, and inhabited the eastern part of present-day Jilin Province. On the other hand, those who lived in the west and spoke the Han language were regarded as nikan, even though some of them had Jurchen or Korean ancestry.

The Manchu, Mongol and Han labels referred to their original composition. Both ethnic Han and sinicised ethnic Jurchens ended up in Han banners.

People from both sides moved between Liaodong and Nurgan. Han soldiers and peasants moved into Nurgan while Jurchen mercenaries and merchants moved to Liaodong, with some lineages on both sides.

==== 1618–1629 ====
From 1618 to 1629, the Han Chinese from eastern Liaodong who joined the Eight Banners were known as "tai nikan"; the Han Chinese who defected to the Manchus at Fushun were known as Fushan Nikan and were considered part of the tai nikan. Descendants of sinicised Jurchens were conquered by the Jianzhou Jurchen Khanate under Nurhaci's rule after 1618. At that time, these descendants of sinicised Jurchens moved to Liaodong, adopted Han culture and family names, swore loyalty to the Ming Empire and spoke the Han language. They eventually became part of the Han banners. Han Chinese in Ming-ruled Liaodong who defected to the Jurchens after they conquered Liaoding were called "frontiersmen" since they had lived on the frontiers of Ming territory.

The transfrontiersmen became part of the Jurchen elite and were assimilated into Jurchen culture to the point where their ancestry was the only thing that differentiated them from Jurchens. Nurhaci differentiated between groups of Han Chinese based on the date they became part of the Later Jin dynasty, a state created by the Jianzhou Jurchens which later became the Qing dynasty.

When Nurhaci conquered Liaodong, he wanted to win over the allegiance of the Han Chinese, so he ordered Jurchens and Han Chinese to be treated equally. He also seized property and resources owned by Jurchens and redistributed them to Han Chinese, and expanded the Jurchen aristocracy to include Han elite families. However, the Jurchens oppressed Han Chinese for labour and stationed Jurchens in Han households to prevent rebellions. As a result, some disgruntled Han Chinese started a revolt in 1623 by sabotaging and killing Jurchens. In response, Nurhaci introduced a practice of discriminating against Han Chinese. For example, Han Chinese might be executed for committing certain offences whereas Jurchens who committed the same offences might be pardoned. However, Nurhaci exempted the tai nikan – Han Chinese who had joined the Jurchens between 1603 and 1619 – from this discriminatory practice.

The Manchu Dahai was described with his origin from the Liao valley and his ethnicity as Han Chinese in the Korean book "Nanjung chamnok; Sok chamnok" (亂中雜錄 / [趙慶南撰) by Cho Kyŏng-nam (趙慶南) (1570–1641) a Korean official and scholar, contradicting Qing texts which says his clan is Giolca. The Qing texts said Dahau's family lived near Fushun in the Giolca region.

==== 1629–1643 ====
The Han Chinese who joined the banners between 1629 and 1643 came from western Liaodong, Shanxi, Shandong and Zhili. They were known as "fu xi baitangga".

Huangtaiji appropriated the term "Hanjun" from the Jurchen-led Jin dynasty (1115–1234)'s miŋgan moumukə (猛安謀克; Jurchen: ) military system and used it as the name for the Han banners. Its original and new meanings differed in usage. The Qing dynasty used "Hanjun" as an adjective for individual bannermen while the Jin dynasty used its literal meaning, for the collective "Han Army".

Nurhaci and Huangtaiji both viewed ethnic identity in terms of culture, language and attitude: Mongols were associated with the Mongol language, nomadism and horses; Manchus were associated with the Manchu language and participation in the banners; Han Chinese were associated with Liaodong, the Han language, agriculture and commerce. Appearance and ancestry were disregarded in favour of culture as the primary factor in differentiating between Manchu and Han. Occasionally identities blurred and could be altered. The creation of the separate Manchu, Mongol and Han banners was rooted in fluctuating categories defined by the Qing government. Banner membership depended on the primary language of the bannermen. It has been suggested that the Han banners were not familiar with the exact meaning of "Hanjun", as the Qing government constantly changed its definition.

Huangtaiji included Han Chinese in his government and adopted the Han style of government. After defeats inflicted by Ming general Yuan Chonghuan upon the Manchus with artillery such as at the Battle of Ningyuan, Huangtaiji recruited Han prisoners-of-war who were trained in firearms into the Manchu army.

Manchu banners inducted (non-bondservant) Han families, such as the family of Bordered Yellow Banner member Zhang Wenxing, the governor of Gansu Province in 1647. Manchu official Duanfang was also Han Chinese. The Manchus' willingness to accept assimilated strangers allowed Han Chinese to integrate into Manchu society.

The Manchus attracted Han military officers to their banners by offering them brides from the Aisin Gioro clan, the imperial clan of the Qing dynasty. A mass marriage of 1,000 Han officers to Manchu women took place in 1632 after Prince Yoto came up with the idea. Huangtaiji said that "since the Han generals and Manchu women lived together and ate together, it would help these surrendered generals to forget their motherland." Women from the Aisin Gioro clan also married other Han officials, such as the sons of Shang Kexi and Geng Zhongming, who defected to the Qing dynasty after their conquest of China. The Manchus created an artillery unit composed of Han soldiers and granted Han officials titles such as "ministers", while Manchus in the same position were regarded as "slaves".

In 1642, the Manchu banners ejected their Han companies and placed them in Han banners, since the members were mostly not assimilated to Manchu culture. However, the banners continued to contain mixed units of both Han and Manchu.

=== 17th century ===
Some Han bannermen and their lineages became successful members of Qing nobility and their descendants continued to be awarded noble titles, such as Li Yongfang, who was ennobled by Nurhaci as a third class viscount and enrolled in the Plain Blue Banner and whose descendants remained as nobles. The Manchus not only gave extensive titles and honours to pre-1644 Han defectors, but also arranged for marriages between them and Manchu noblewomen.

In the early Qing dynasty, the Qing government made distinctions between Han bannermen and Han civilians. Former subjects of the Ming dynasty, regardless of their origin, were categorised as Han Chinese, so some Manchus ended up in Mongol and Han banners. Nurhaci also allowed transfrontiersmen to identify themselves as Manchu after assimilation. The Kangxi Emperor later moved both Han and Mongol families to Manchu banners from their original Mongol and Han banners.

Han bannermen such as Geng Zhongming rose to powerful positions and prominence under the Shunzhi Emperor. They "were barely distinguishable from Manchu nobility."

Both Manchus and Han Chinese joined the Han banners before Qing forces passed through Shanhai Pass in 1644. As such, they were both distinguished from Han Chinese who joined the Qing Empire after 1644. The pre-1644 Han bannermen were known as "old men" (旧人; jiù rén). In 1740, the Qianlong Emperor ordered a mass transfer of the Fushun Nikan and selected tai nikan, Koreans and Mongols into the Manchu banners.

Manchu bannermen in Beijing ended up in poverty just decades after the Manchu conquest of China, living in slums and falling into debt, with signs of their plight appearing as soon as 1655. Their poverty forced them to sell their property to Han Chinese, in violation of the law.

In the early Qing dynasty, the emperors took some Han women as concubines. A 1648 decree from the Shunzhi Emperor allowed Han men to marry Manchu women with the permission of the Board of Revenue if the brides were registered daughters of officials or commoners, or with the permission of the banner company captain if they were unregistered commoners. Later, the xiunü (秀女; "talented women") system drafted women from the Han banners for the imperial harem, but excluded daughters of Han commoners.

Han bannermen were permitted to marry Han civilian women. However, the emperors were distressed to find that the women followed Han civilian customs in clothing and jewellery when they were drafted for palace service. They then banned daughters of common Han bannermen from serving in the imperial palace as maids and consorts, exempting them from the draft, out of concern for to the economic plight of Han bannermen. Another possible reason was the Qing government's alarm over Han banner girls following Han civilian customs such as wearing robes with wide sleeves, feet binding and wearing a single earring, contrary to Manchu custom. Daughters of Manchu and Mongol bannerman had to submit to the draft where they could be selected to serve in the imperial palace as maids or consorts. Daughters of Han bannermen were exempt this draft. Han banner girls were not allowed to become imperial concubines.

Manchu bannermen typically used their given rather than lineal name to address themselves, while Han bannermen used their both in normal Chinese style. Many Han bannermen adopted Manchu names, which may have been motivated by associating with the elite. Han bannermen also adopted Manchu naming practices such as naming their offspring with numbers. Some of them manchu-fied their lineal names by appending "giya" to their original family names. Han bannermen such as Zhao Erfeng, Zhao Erxun and Cao Xueqin kept their Chinese names, while others used both Manchu and Chinese names.

The practices of transferring families from Han banners or bondservant status (booi) to Manchu banners, and of switching ethnicity from Han to Manchu, were known as "raising the banner" (抬旗; tái qí) in Chinese. They joined the "upper three" Manchu banners. According to Qing government policy, the immediate family members (e.g. fathers, brothers) of the mother of an emperor was transferred into the upper three Manchu banners by default, even if the family was Han Chinese. Moreover, after the transfer, the family had to include a giya (佳) suffix to their family name. For example, Empress Xiaoyichun, who bore the Jiaqing Emperor, had her maiden family name converted from Wei (魏) to Weigiya (魏佳). Such transfers typically occurred in cases of intermarriage between Han Chinese and the Manchu imperial clan.

The Manchu banner companies included Han and Mongol individuals, and Mongol, Korean, Russian and Tibetan companies. Manchu banners had two main divisions between the higher ranking "Old Manchus" formed of the main Jurchen tribes such as the Jianzhou and the lower ranking "New Manchus" (伊車滿洲/衣車滿洲; i'ce manju; or 新滿洲) made out of other Tungusic and Mongolic tribes such as the Daur, Oroqen, Solon, Nanai, Kiakar (Kuyula) and Sibe from the northeast who were incorporated into the Manchu banners by the Shunzhi and Kangxi Emperors after 1644. They fought for the Qing Empire against the Russian Empire in the Amur River Basin.

=== 18th century ===
The Qianlong Emperor reclassified the Han banners, saying that they were to be regarded as having the same culture and ancestral extraction as Han civilians. This replaced Nurhaci and Huangtaiji's position of classifying them according to culture. The Qianlong Emperor's view influenced historians and overshadowed their views.

However, Han Banner families who had joined early in Qing history were still retained in the Banners, while those who were removed were those who enrolled later. Moreover, the removal of Bannermen was primarily due to the growing costs of supporting the expanding Banner population, rather than ethnic discrimination. Han Bannermen stationed in Manchuria or affiliated with Manchu and Mongol Banners were retained. Han Bannermen posted to the Imperial Household Department, to some specialist units such as naval forces, or high-ranking official positions were also not dismissed. Discharged Han Bannermen who re-enlisted in the Green Standard Army were also retained in the Banner register. The numbers of discharged Han Bannermen who re-enlisted in the Green Standard Army were very considerable; in the Jingkou garrison, two-thirds of the discharged re-enlisted.

The Qianlong Emperor held that loyalty was the most important trait, labelling the Ming defectors as traitors. He compiled the book Record of Those Martyred for Their Dynasty and Sacrificed for Purity, which contained unfavourable biographies of prominent Han banner defectors and biographies which glorified Ming loyalists who were martyred in battle against the Qing Empire. Some of the emperor's inclusions and omissions on the list were political, such as including Li Yongfang (to undermine his descendant Li Shiyao) and excluding Ma Mingpei (to protect his son Ma Xiongzhen's image).

== Segregation from civilian population and intermarriage ==
Bannermen were segregated from Han civilians in their own garrisons. Manchu and Han bannermen were allowed to take Han civilian women as concubines, but Manchu and Han bannerwomen were punished with expulsion from the banners if they married Han civilian men. Bannerwomen were allowed to marry only bannermen. Since Han bannermen were treated as semi-Manchus according to the law, Manchu bannerwomen were allowed to marry Han bannermen. Manchu women and Han bannermen could marry each other with no prohibitions. Owen Lattimore reported that during his January 1930 visit to Manchuria, he studied a community in Jilin Province, where both Manchu and Chinese bannermen were settled at a town called Wulakai and could not be distinguished from Manchus.

In Xi'an during the 1911 Xinhai Revolution, impoverished Han soldiers took young Manchu women as wives after seizing the banner garrison.

During the Republican era, intermarriage began to occur between Han civilians and Manchus, mostly involving Han men marrying Manchu women, since poverty diminished the marital prospects of Manchu men.

== Bondservants ==
After 1616, the aha (enslaved Jurchens, Koreans, Han and Mongols), became part of the booi (bondservants) and were attached to Manchu banners. No evidence suggests that after 1621, most of the booi were Han Chinese. Instead they included Koreans and ethnic Manchus. Prisoners-of-war and abductees were another part of the aha. Manchus integrated with some of the captured Han Chinese and Koreans. The Jianzhou Jurchens accepted some Han Chinese and Koreans who became jušen (freeholders) in Jurchen territory.

== Manchu identity ==
The term "Manchu" varies in meaning; various groups within the Eight Banners are considered Manchu. One definition of Manchu was the "Old Manchu" including the Aisin Gioro clan, of the original founding populations who spoke Manchu and who were the basis of the banner system. The Qing Empire relied most on this group.

Another definition distinguishes Old Manchus and New Manchus, who together made up the Manchu Eight Banners. After 1644, the Manchu banners incorporated other Tungusic peoples (such as the Sibe, Evenki, Oroqen and Nanai), who became the new Manchus.

The concept of the Manchu ethnic group "Manzu" (滿族) existed during the late Qing dynasty and early Republican period. However, the banner/civilian dichotomy defined people's primary identity, instead of the Manchu/Han ethnic distinction. The Manchus were referred to most often as qiren (旗人; bannermen), Manren (滿人), or Manzhouren (滿洲人), which were not ethnic terms, while the word "Manzu", which indicated Manchu as an ethnicity, was generally unused.

=== Convergence with the Banners ===
Interchangeability of Manchu and qiren (旗人; bannermen) emerged in the 17th century. The Qianlong Emperor referred to all bannermen (Manchu or qiren) as Manchu and civilians as Han or min (民). Man-Han and qimin (旗民) both referred to the Banners. Qing laws did not say "Manchu" but referred to the affected as "bannermen." The 18th century the identification of "qiren" with "Manchu" grew stronger due to the policy of using banners to reinforce it. This became more pronounced until the 1911 Xinhai Revolution. All bannermen and their descendants were recognised as ethnic Manchus by the People's Republic of China.

Edward Rhoads asserted that the Manchu ethnic group was synonymous with the Eight Banners from the Boxer Rebellion until the People's Republic of China recognised the Manchu ethnic group.

When the Communist Party was creating new classifications for ethnic minorities in the 1950s, all members of the Eight Banners could opt to join the newly created Manchu ethnicity which replaced the term qiren. The Mongol and Han bannermen could choose to be classified as Mongol or Han instead of Manchu. The "New Manchu" Daur, Sibe, Evenki, Oroqen and Nanai were allowed to form separate ethnic groups from the Manchus.

== See also ==
- Qipao
- Military of the Qing dynasty
- New Qing History
- Sinicization of the Manchus

== Bibliography ==
- Crossley, Pamela (1983), "The Tong in Two Worlds: Cultural Identities in Liaodong and Nurgan during the 13th-17th centuries", Ch'ing-shih wen-t'i, 4 (9), Johns Hopkins University Press, ISSN 0577-9235
- Crossley, Pamela (1989), "The Qianlong Retrospect on the Chinese-martial (hanjun) Banners", Late Imperial China, 10 (2), Johns Hopkins University Press, ISSN 0884-3236
- Crossley, Pamela Kyle (1990), Orphan Warriors: Three Manchu Generations and the End of the Qing World, Princeton University Press, ISBN 9780691008776
- Crossley, Pamela Kyle (1999), A Translucent Mirror: History and Identity in Qing Imperial Ideology, University of California Press, ISBN 0520928849
- Crossley, Pamela Kyle; Siu, Helen F.; Sutton, Donald S., eds. (2006), Empire at the Margins: Culture, Ethnicity, and Frontier in Early Modern China, Studies on China, vol. 28, University of California Press, ISBN 9780520230156
- Crossley, Pamela Kyle (2010), Kagan, Kimberly (ed.), The Imperial Moment, Paul Bushkovitch, Nicholas Canny, Pamela Kyle Crossley, Arthur Eckstein, Frank Ninkovich, Loren J. Samons, Harvard University Press, ISBN 978-0674054097
- Elliott, Mark C. (January 1999), "Manchu Widows and Ethnicity in Qing China" (PDF), Comparative Studies in Society and History, 41 (1), Cambridge University Press: 33–71, doi:10.1017/S0010417599001863, JSTOR 179248, PMID 20120554, S2CID 31374587
- Elliott, Mark C. (2001), The Manchu Way: The Eight Banners and Ethnic Identity in Late Imperial China, Stanford University Press, ISBN 9780804746847
- Hayter-Menzies, Grant (2008), Imperial Masquerade: The Legend of Princess Der Ling, Hong Kong University Press, ISBN 978-9622098817
- Hammond, Kenneth James; Stapleton, Kristin Eileen, eds. (2008). The Human Tradition in Modern China. Rowman & Littlefield. ISBN 978-0742554665.
- Janhunen, Juha; Rybatzki, Volker, eds. (1999), Writing in the Altaic World, Studia Orientalia, vol. 87, Finnish Oriental Society, ISBN 9519380434
- Lattimore, Owen (Jul–Sep 1933), "Wulakai Tales from Manchuria", The Journal of American Folklore, 46 (181), American Folklore Society: 272–286, doi:10.2307/535718, JSTOR 535718
- McCoy, John F.; Light, Timothy, eds. (1986), Contributions to Sino-Tibetan Studies, Cornell Linguistic Contributions, V. 5, vol. 5, Brill Archive, ISBN 9004078509
- Muramatsu, Yuji (Feb 1972), "Banner Estates and Banner Lands in 18th Century China - Evidence from Two New Sources" (PDF), Hitotsubashi Journal of Economics, 12 (2), Hitotsubashi University: 1–13, hdl:10086/8019
- Naquin, Susan (2000), Peking: Temples and City Life, 1400-1900, University of California Press, ISBN 0520923456
- Rawski, Evelyn S. (1998), The Last Emperors: A Social History of Qing Imperial Institutions, University of California Press, ISBN 052092679X
- Rhoads, Edward J. M. (2000), Manchus and Han: Ethnic Relations and Political Power in Late Qing and Early Republican China, 1861–1928, University of Washington Press, ISBN 0-295-98040-0
- Spence, Jonathan D. (1988), Tsʻao Yin and the Kʻang-hsi Emperor: Bondservant and Master, Yale Historical Publications: Miscellany, vol. 85, Yale University Press, ISBN 0300042779
- Spence, Jonathan D. (1990), The Search for Modern China, W. W. Norton & Company, ISBN 0-393-30780-8 - Profile at Google Books
- Taveirne, Patrick (2004), Han-Mongol Encounters and Missionary Endeavors: A History of Scheut in Ordos (Hetao) 1874-1911, Louvain Chinese studies, vol. 15, Leuven University Press, ISBN 9058673650
- Wakeman, Frederic Jr. (1977), The Fall of Imperial China, Simon & Schuster, ISBN 0029336805
- Wakeman, Frederic Jr. (1979), "The Shun Interregnum of 1644", in Spence, Jonathan D.; Wills, John E. Jr. (eds.), From Ming to Ch'ing: Conquest, Region, and Continuity in Seventeenth-century China, Yale University Press, ISBN 0300026722
- Wakeman, Frederic Jr. (1985), The Great Enterprise: The Manchu Reconstruction of Imperial Order in Seventeenth-century China, Berkeley: University of California Press, ISBN 0520048040
- Wang, Shuo (2008), "Qing Imperial Women: Empresses, Concubines, and Aisin Gioro Daughters", in Walthall, Anne (ed.), Servants of the Dynasty: Palace Women in World History, The California World History Library, vol. 7, University of California Press, ISBN 978-0520254442
- Watson, Rubie Sharon; Ebrey, Patricia Buckley, eds. (1991), Marriage and Inequality in Chinese Society, Studies on China, vol. 12, Joint Committee on Chinese Studies (U.S.), University of California Press, ISBN 0520071247
- 金光平; 金启孮; 乌拉熙春 (1996), 《爱新觉罗氏三代满学论集》, 远方出版社, ISBN 9787805951485
