= Plain Red Banner =

- Plain Red Banner
- Active: 1601–1912
- Country: Later Jin; Qing dynasty
- Part of: Eight Banners
- Commander: Daišan The Emperor

Plain Red Banner

Chinese name
- Traditional Chinese: 正紅旗
- Simplified Chinese: 正红旗
Transcriptions
Standard Mandarin
- Hanyu Pinyin: zhènghóngqí

Mongolian name
- Mongolian Cyrillic: Шулуун улаан хошуу

Manchu name
- Manchu script: ᡤᡠᠯᡠ ᡶᡠᠯᡤᡳᠶᠠᠨ ᡤᡡᠰᠠ
- Romanization: gulu fulgiyan gūsa

The Plain Red Banner (Chinese: 正紅旗) was one of the Eight Banners (lower five banners) of Manchu military and society organization during the Later Jin and Qing dynasties of China. The first Commander of the Plain Red Banner was Daisan, the 2nd son of Nurhaci, and was later honored as Prince Li of the First Rank. The two Red Banners have been passed down to all the Prince Li Peerage and all descendants of Daisan in some capacity.

By 1651 it was the only banner besides the emperor's upper three banners to be in the control of a single family.

Famous members included:

- Daišan Prince Li (2nd son of Nurhaci)
- Yoto (Eldest son of Daišan, as secondary commander after his father and later held control over the Bordered Red Banner)
- Šoto (2nd son of Daisan, along with his brother Yoto, was involved in both red banners)
- Mandahai (7th son of Daisan)
- Canggadai (Eldest son of Mandahai, grandson of Daisan)
- Giyesu (Grandson of Daisan, distant cousin loyal supporter of the Kangxi Emperor)
- Zheng Keshuang (Han bannerman) (Prince of Yanping, third and last ruler of the Kingdom of Tungning in Taiwan, second son of Zheng Jing and a grandson of Koxinga (Zheng Chenggong). After surrendering to the Qing dynasty in 1683, he was ennobled as Duke of Hanjun and incorporated into the Chinese Han Plain Red Banner.
- Wenxiang
- Heshen, from the Niohuru clan, considered one of the most corrupt officials in history
- Lao She
- Noble Consort Cheng

== Notable clans ==
- Fuca clan
- Gūwalgiya
- Niohuru
- Hešeri
- Donggo
- Wuqigeli
- Ning
- Li
- Zheng
