= Chuntai =

- Prince Kang of the First Rank 和碩康親王

Prince Kang of the First Rank
- Tenure: 7 July 1697 – 20 June 1709
- Predecessor: Giyesu
- Successor: Chong'an
- Born: 5 September 1683
- Died: 20 June 1709 (aged 25)
- Spouse: Lady Usun (烏蘇氏)
- Issue: Chong'an
Names
- Chuntai (椿泰)
Posthumous name
- Prince Kangdao of the First Rank (康悼親王)
- House: Aisin Gioro
- Father: Giyesu
- Mother: Lady Donggo (董鄂氏)

Chuntai (Chinese: 椿泰; 5 September 1683 – 20 June 1709), posthumous name Prince Kangdao of the First Rank, was an imperial prince of the Qing dynasty of China. He was the fifth son of Giyesu.

== Life ==
Chuntai was born on 5 September 1683 to lady Donggo, second primary princess consort Kangliang. Chuntai inherited the title of Prince Kang of the First Rank after father's death in 1697.

=== Involvement in Maci's incident ===
When Yunreng was deposed for the first time after being implicated in Songgotu's case of attempt to murder Kangxi Emperor, Chuntai requested the emperor to pardon Yunreng (it was discovered that Yunreng was a victim of witchcraft). After Yunreng was reinstated as a Crown Prince, Chuntai was ordered to interrogate Maci following the imperial decree on recall from official position for the affiliation with Yunsi (Maci supported Yunsi's candidature as Crown Prince in 1708). Maci's brothers were stripped of their positions, while wives of Maci were sent to Heilongjiang and sold into slavery.

=== Personal qualities ===
Chuntai was described as generous and tolerant person. Chuntai had also interest in Chinese opera - he specialised in Liuheqiang (六合枪) and dance with Alebard. His force was object of speculations - it was said that Chuntai could attack 10 people simultaneously.

=== Death and succession ===
Chuntai died on 20 June 1709, posthumously honoured as Prince Kang Dao of the First Rank (康悼親王). He was succeeded by the eldest son, Chong'an. After Chong'an's death, the title was passed to Ba'ertu and then back to his descendants.

== Family ==
Chuntai's primary consort was lady Usun, daughter of fourth rank literary official Zhuduna (朱杜纳).

- Primary consort, of the Usun clan (嫡福晋乌苏氏)
- Secondary consort, of the Irgen Gioro clan (侧福晋伊尔根觉罗氏)
  - Prince Kangxiu of the First Rank Chong'an
- Mistress, of the Nara clan （庶福晋那拉氏)
