= Yong'en =

- Prince Li of the First Rank 和碩禮親王

Prince Li of the First Rank
- Tenure: 25 January 1778 – 10 April 1805
- Successor: Zhaolian

Prince Kang of the First Rank
- Tenure: 26 November 1753 – 25 January 1778
- Predecessor: Bartu
- Born: 12 September 1727; Beijing
- Died: 10 April 1805 (aged 77); Beijing
- Spouse: Lady Ujaku Lady Sumuru Lady Sun
- Issue: Zhaolian
Names
- Yong'en (永恩)
Posthumous name
- Prince Ligong of the First Rank (禮恭親王)
- House: Aisin Gioro
- Father: Chong'an
- Mother: Lady Sirin Gioro

Yong'en
- Chinese: 永恩
Transcriptions
Standard Mandarin
- Hanyu Pinyin: Yǒng'ēn

Huizhou (courtesy name)
- Traditional Chinese: 惠週
- Simplified Chinese: 惠周
- Literal meaning: Kind and considerate
Transcriptions

Lanting Zhuren (art name)
- Traditional Chinese: 蘭亭主人
- Simplified Chinese: 兰亭主人
- Literal meaning: Master of the Pavilion of the Orchids
Transcriptions
Standard Mandarin
- Hanyu Pinyin: Lántíng zhǔrén

Yong'en (永恩; 12 September 1727 – 10 April 1805) was the second son of Chong'an, Prince Kangxiu of the First Rank.

== Life ==
He held the title of beile from 1734 to 1753, when his uncle Bartu succeeded to the title of Prince Kang of the First Rank. He succeeded the peerage under the title Prince Kang of the First Rank in 1753.

By the virtues of his ancestor Daišan, the peerage was renamed to "Prince Li of the First Rank" in 1778. Yong'en was described as respectful, indifferent and thrifty to himself. The prince was versed in art and literature - he created several pictures inspired by "Eight Houses of Jinling" and Lu Qiang. His written works include:

- "Collection of Studio of Benefit" (《益斋集》, pinyin: yizhaiji),
- "The story of the family of Yaonai" (《姚鼐撰家传》, pinyin: yaonaizhuanjiachuan),
- Four types of ripple garden" (《漪园四种》, pinyin: yiyuansizhong)
- "History of the Hall of Sincere Rightness" (《诚正堂稿》, pinyin: chengzhengtanggao).

Yong'en held the peerage until his death on 10 April 1805. He was posthumously honoured as Prince Li Gong of the First Rank (禮恭親王, "gong" meaning "respectful" or "reverent").

== Family ==
Father: Chong'an, Prince Kangxiu of the First Rank
Mother: Lady Sirin Gioro, Secondary consort

Consorts and issue:

- Primary consort, lady Ujaku (嫡福晋 吴扎库氏)
- Second primary consort, lady Šumuru (继福晋 舒穆禄氏 )
  - Zhaolian, first son
- Mistress, of the Sun clan (妾 孙氏)

== Ancestry ==
Ancestors of Yong'en

Giyesu
Chuntai
Lady Donggo, primary consort
Chong'an
Lady Irgen Gioro, Secondary consort
Yong'en
Lady Sirin Gioro, Secondary consort
