= Canggadai =

Imperial prince of the Qing dynasty of China

- Beile

Prince Xun of the First Rank
- Tenure: 1652–1659
- Predecessor: Mandahai
- Successor: Giyesu (as Prince Kang of the First Rank)
- Born: 21 November 1643
- Died: 29 May 1665 (aged 21)
- Spouse: Lady Naiman Borjigit; Lady Naiman Borijit
- Issue: Suojin (索晉); Xilengtu (西楞圖); Shixian (世憲); Guangchang (廣昌); Xichang (希常); Xingni (星尼)
Names
- Canggadai (常阿岱)
Posthumous name
- Prince Huaimin of the Third Rank (懷愍貝勒)
- House: Aisin Gioro
- Father: Mandahai
- Mother: Lady Khorchin Borjigit

Canggadai (Chinese: 常阿岱; 21 November 1643 – 29 May 1665), posthumous name Prince Huaimin of the Third Rank (懷愍貝勒), was an imperial prince of the Qing dynasty of China. He was a son of Mandahai and his primary consort, Lady Khorchin Borijit.

== Life ==
Canggadai was born in the last year of Huang Taiji's reign as Mandahai's seventh son. He had a full brother named Huse.

In the 9th year of the Shunzhi Emperor's reign (1652), his father died and he inherited the title of "Prince Xun". However, in the 16th year of Shunzhi's reign (1659), it was found that his father had confiscated a part of former Prince Regent Dorgon's property, which lead to Canggadai's demotion. He was demoted from the First Rank prince to Third Rank (beile). His father Mandahai was also demoted posthumously.

He died in the 4th year of the Kangxi Emperor's reign (1665), and the court gave him the posthumous name Huaimin (懷愍). His princedom was inherited by his sixth son, Xingni.

== Family ==
Parents:

- Father: Mandahai, Prince Xunjian of the First Rank (巽簡親王 滿達海; 30 April 1622 – 15 March 1652)
- Mother: Primary consort Khorchin Borjigit (嫡福晉 博爾濟吉特氏)

Wives

Primary Consort

- Primary Consort, of the Naiman Borijit (嫡夫人奈曼博爾濟吉特氏)
- Secondary Consort, of the Nara clan (側福晉納喇氏)
  - Xingni (星尼; 18 November 1665 – 3 February 1729), sixth son

Secondary Consort

- Secondary Consort, of the Zhou clan (側夫人周氏)
  - Xilengtu (奉恩將軍 錫楞圖), General of the Fourth Rank, second son

Concubine

- Mistress, of the Shi clan (庶福晋石氏)
  - Shixian (奉恩將軍 世憲), General of the Fourth Rank, third son
  - Xichang (奉恩將軍 希常), General of the Fourth Rank, fifth son
- Mistress, of the Han clan (庶夫人韓氏)
  - Suojing (索晉), first son
  - Guangchang (廣昌), General of the Fourth Rank, fourth son
- Mistress, of the Tang clan (妾唐氏)

== See also ==
- Royal and noble ranks of the Qing dynasty
- Ranks of imperial consorts in China#Qing
