= Bartu =

- Prince Kang of the First Rank 和碩康親王

Prince Kang of the First Rank
- Tenure: 14 October 1733 – 10 April 1753
- Predecessor: Chong'an
- Successor: Yong'en
- Born: 12 September 1674
- Died: 10 April 1753 (aged 78)
- Spouse: Lady Ezhuo
- Issue: Mozhang; Moben; Mojing; Moguang and 21 other children
Names
- Bartu
Posthumous name
- Prince Kangjian of the First Rank (康簡親王)
- House: Aisin Gioro
- Father: Giyesu
- Mother: Lady Sakda

Bartu (Manchu: ᠪᠠᡵᡨᡠ᠋, Chinese: 巴爾圖, 12 September 1674 - 10 April 1753) was a Manchu prince of the Qing dynasty. He was Giyesu's fourth son and a fifth-generation descendant of Daišan, Nurhaci's second son. Bartu was the last Prince Kang of the First Rank as his peerage was renamed back to "Prince Li of the First Rank" in commemoration of Daishan's contribution to establishment of the Qing dynasty.

== Life ==
Bartu was born on 12 September 1674 to secondary princess consort Kangliang of the first rank, lady Sakda. In 1733, Bartu succeeded to the title of Prince Kang of the First Rank after the death of Chong'an.

=== Involvement in the coup of Hongxi ===
In 1739, Hongxi (2nd in Prince Li of the First Rank peerage, Yunreng's son) formed a faction together with Hongsheng (son of Prince Heng of the First Rank Yunqi), Prince Ning of the Second Rank Hongjiao (son of Prince Yi of the First Rank Yinxiang), Hongchang, Yunlu and Hongpu (son of Prince Zhuang of the First Rank Yunlu). They aimed to oust the Qianlong Emperor from power and support Hongxi's succession to the imperial throne. The faction failed to achieve its aim as Hongpu dispatched a messenger to report an urgent matter to the emperor, who resided at that time in Rehe. Hongpu was arrested at the Copper Wall by imperial guards. After the imperial hunt, all the conspirators were temporarily imprisoned at the Imperial Clan Court, where the trial was held. One of the interrogators was Bartu, who was entrusted with the affairs of the imperial clan court. The princes being underlings of Hongxi were stripped of their title and imprisoned (Hongxi, Hongsheng, Hongchang), deprived of the allowance (Hongjiao) or demoted, e.g. Hongpu, who was demoted to grace defender duke. The proper decree was drafted by Bartu and Zhang Tingyu, one of the most prominent officials of the Qianlong era.

=== Court career ===
In 1748, Bartu was sent to the Imperial Ancestral Temple to conduct sacrificial rites. In 1749 and in 1751, Bartu was sent to the Temple of Heaven to pray for good harvests. In 1749, Bartu made sacrifices at the Temple of Earth. In 1752, he was dismissed of attending court sessions due to serious illness. Bartu died of illness at the age of 79 on 10 April 1753 and was posthumously honoured as "Prince Kangjian of the First Rank" (和硕康简亲王)

== Family ==
Bartu was married to Lady Ezhuo, daughter of Qishan (奇山). His second primary consort was the sister of the previous one. Bartu had in summary 24 sons and at least one daughter, whose marriage was held in 1765. The number of children he had was one of the greatest among the Qing dynasty royalty (Kangxi Emperor had in summary 55 children, Shanqi had 38 children).

- Primary consort, of the Ezhuo clan (嫡福晋鄂卓氏)
  - Mozhang (奉国将军谋章, 11 May 1698 – 14 December 1762), 1st son
- Second primary consort, of the Ezhuo clan (继福晉鄂卓氏)
  - Mocheng (谋成, 1708 – 1711), 3rd son
  - Moben (奉国将军谋本, 1712 – 1759), 4th son
  - Mohong (谋宏, 1714 – 1730), 5th son
  - Mowen (谋文, 1717 – 1748), 6th son
  - Mosheng (谋声, 1719 – 1721), 7th son
  - Moyun (谋云, 1721 – 1764), 8th son
- Secondary consort, of the Zhou clan (侧福晋周氏), daughter of Sige (四格)
  - Modian (辅国将军谋典, 1736 – 1793), 15th son
  - First class bulwark general Moguang (一等辅国将军谋广, 1737-1766), 17th son
  - Mojian (谋建1738-1741), 19th son
- Secondary consort, of the Xia clan (侧福晋夏氏), daughter of Xia Liu（夏六）
  - Motai (谋泰, 1735 – 1738), 12th son
  - Morui (谋瑞, 1736 – 1747), 16th son
  - Second class bulwark general Moxian (二等辅国将军谋显, 1738-1788), 20th son
  - Third class defender general Moliang (三等镇国将军谋亮, 1740-1796), 23rd son
- Secondary consort, of the Xia clan (侧福晋夏氏), daughter of Shihou（世侯）
- Secondary consort, of the Li clan (侧福晋李氏), daughter of Li Xin (李新)
  - Moling (谋灵, 1740-1741), 22nd son
- Mistress, of the Zhou clan (庶福晉周氏), daughter of Zhou Liu (周六)
  - Mocun (谋存, 1701–1719), 2nd son
- Mistress, of the Shen clan (庶福晉申氏), daughter of Sange (三格)
  - Moshou (谋寿, 1735 –1739), 9th son
- Mistress, of the Shen clan (庶福晋申氏), daughter of Shen Da (申达)
  - Moyao (谋耀, 1735-1736), 11th son
  - Mohao (谋浩, 1740-1744), 24th son
- Mistress, of the Xia clan (庶福晉夏氏), daughter of Sige (四格)
  - Supporter general Mogong (奉国将军谋恭, 1735 – 1777), 13th son
- Mistress, of the Han clan (庶福晉韩氏)
  - Supporter general Mojing (奉国将军谋经, 1735 –1 770), 14th son
  - Moshun (谋顺, 1737-1754), 18th son
- Mistress, of the Gao clan (庶福晉高氏)
  - Moxun (谋勋, 1739-1741), 21st son
- Mistress, of the Zhang clan (妾張氏)
- Mistress, of the Wu clan (妾吳氏)
- Mistress, of the Li clan (妾李氏), daughter of Zhimao (芝茂)
- Mistress, of the Xiong clan (妾熊氏)
  - Moyu (谋裕, 1735–1737), 10th son
