= Giyesu =

- Prince Kang of the First Rank 和碩康親王

Prince Kang of the First Rank
- Tenure: 14 January 1660 – 1 April 1697
- Predecessor: Canggadai (as Prince Xun)
- Successor: Chuntai
- Born: 12 December 1645
- Died: 1 April 1697 (aged 51)
- Issue: Bartu; Chuntai
Names
- Giyesu (傑書)
Posthumous name
- Prince Kangliang of the First Rank (康良親王)
- House: Aisin Gioro
- Father: Hūse (祜塞)

Giyesu
- Traditional Chinese: 傑書
- Simplified Chinese: 杰书
Transcriptions
Standard Mandarin
- Hanyu Pinyin: Jiéshū

Giyesu (Manchu: ᡤᡳᠶᡝᡧᡠ, Möllendorff: Giyešu, Abkai: Giyexu; 12 December 1645 – 1 April 1697), posthumous name Prince Kangliang of the First Rank, was an imperial prince and general of the Qing dynasty of China. He was a distant cousin of the Kangxi Emperor and is best known for leading Qing forces to suppress a rebellion by Geng Jingzhong in southwestern China in 1674–1675 and repel an invasion by the Kingdom of Tungning in 1676–1677.

== Title inheritance ==
Giyesu was born in the Manchu Aisin Gioro clan as a great-grandson of Nurhaci, the founder of the Qing dynasty. His grandfather, Daišan, was the founding title holder of the Prince Li peerage. His father, Hūse (祜塞; d. 1646), who was the eighth and youngest son of Daišan, held the title of a feng'en zhenguo gong or first-class imperial duke. After Hūse died, his title was inherited by his second son, Jinggi (精濟; 1644–1649), who, sometime before 1649, was promoted to a junwang (second-rank prince). Jinggi died in July 1649. Giyesu, who was then only four years old, became the heir to Jinggi's princely peerage. In 1651, he was conferred the title "Prince Kang of the Second Rank".

In 1659, Giyesu's uncle, Mandahai, was posthumously convicted and demoted from a qinwang (first-rank prince) to a beile (third-rank prince). Mandahai's son, Chang'adai, was also demoted from a qinwang to beile. The Prince Li peerage, which was previously held by Mandahai, was then passed on to Giyesu, who inherited it under the Prince Kang title; Giyesu was promoted to "Prince Kang of the First Rank".

== Career ==
In the late spring of 1674, Prince Kang was appointed as a general and ordered to lead imperial troops to Zhejiang to suppress a rebellion by Geng Jingzhong, one of the "Three Feudatories". Among his deputies were Fulata, Laita (賴塔), Laha (喇哈) and Jirtab (紀爾他布). In the ninth month, when Prince Kang and his army arrived in Jinhua, Geng Jingzhong had already conquered Wenzhou, Chuzhou and other cities in southern Zhejiang. Not long later, Geng Jingzhong's subordinate, Xu Shangchao (徐尚朝), led 50,000 troops to attack Jinhua. In response, Prince Kang ordered Bayar (巴雅爾) and Mahada (馬哈達) to lead imperial forces to resist the rebels; Bayar and Mahada's forces defeated Wu Rongxian (吳榮先) and killed over 20,000 rebels. In the 12th month, Xu Shangchao personally led 50,000 troops to attack the villages south of Jinhua. Baya'er and Chen Shikai (陳世凱) led imperial troops to attack the rebels and defeated them at Jidaoshan (積道山), and recaptured Yongkang and Jinyun counties from the rebels. Prince Kang defeated Fang Maogong (方懋功) at Shangyu, and Feng Gongfu (馮公輔) at Yiwu and Wuyi County and took back the territories from the rebels.

In 1675, Mahada and Li Rong (李榮) defeated Sha Youxiang (沙有祥) at Taohua Ridge (桃花嶺) and recaptured Chuzhou from the rebels. In the following year, Prince Kang led imperial forces through Zhejiang and prepared to attack Fujian, which was under rebel control. Around the time, Zheng Jing, the ruler of the Kingdom of Tungning in Taiwan, had occupied the prefectures of Zhangzhou and Quanzhou in Fujian. At this point, Geng Jingzhong's rebel forces were running short on supplies. In the ninth lunar month of 1676, Prince Kang successfully recaptured Jianyang and forced the rebels at Jianning and Yanping to surrender. Sensing that defeat was imminent, Geng Jingzhong sent his son, Geng Xianzuo (耿顯祚), to meet Prince Kang and convey his wish to surrender. He personally surrendered to Prince Kang later on. In the tenth month, Prince Kang and Qing imperial forces entered Fuzhou and completely pacified Geng Jingzhong's rebellion.

In the tenth lunar month of 1676, Zheng Jing's subordinate, Xu Yao (許耀), led 30,000 troops to attack Fuzhou. In response, Prince Kang ordered Lahada (拉哈達) to lead imperial forces to resist Zheng's forces. The imperial army was victorious and recaptured Ninghua, Qingliu, Changting and other counties. In the first month of 1677, Lahada and Laita (賴塔) defeated Zheng Jing's forces at Baimaoshan (白茅山) and Taipingshan (太平山), and recaptured Xinghua (now part of Putian and Xianyou) from the enemy. By the second month, they had driven Zheng Jing's forces out of Quanzhou and Zhangzhou and pacified most of Fujian. In the fourth month, Prince Kang wrote to Zheng Jing, who had retreated to Xiamen, to surrender. Zheng Jing refused, so Prince Kang prepared for an attack on Xiamen. At the same time, Prince Kang also recommended Yao Qisheng to the Qing imperial court to serve as the governor-general of Fujian. By 1680, Zheng Jing had been completely defeated in Fujian and forced to retreat with his remaining forces back to Taiwan.

Prince Kang died in 1697 and was posthumously honoured as Prince Kangliang of the First Rank (康良親王). He was survived by at least two sons, Chuntai (椿泰; d. 1709) and Bartu (巴爾圖; d. 1753), who successively inherited the Prince Kang title from their father.

== Family ==
Father: Huse, Prince Kanghuishun of the First Rank (康惠顺亲王)

Mother: Primary consort, of the Khorchin Borjigin clan

Consorts and issue:

- Primary consort, of the Khorchin Borjigin clan (嫡福晋 科尔沁博尔济吉特氏), daughter of Prince Esen (额森台吉)
- Primary consort, of the Donggo clan (继福晋 董鄂氏), daughter of Huase (华塞)
  - Princess of the Third Rank (郡主; 21 November 1681 – 15 December 1706), personal name Huiqing (惠卿) eight daughter
    - Married Nalan Kuifeng (纳兰揆方; 22 May 1680 – 5 February 1708), son of Nalan Mingzhu, of the Yehe Nara clan and had issue (a son and a daughter)
  - Chuntai, Prince Kangdao of the First Rank (康悼亲王 春泰; 5 September 1683 – 20 June 1709), fifth son
- Secondary consort, of the Sakda clan (侧福晋 萨克达氏), daughter of Mase (马塞)
  - Ba'ertu, Prince Kangjian of the First Rank (康简亲王 巴尔图, 12 September 1674 – 10 April 1753), fourth son
- Mistress, of the Šumuru clan (舒穆录氏)
  - Nitaha, Third class bulwark general (已革三等辅国将军 尼塔哈; 21 February 1667 – 26 October 1723), first son
- Mistress, of the Nara clan (那拉氏), daughter of Xihana (西哈纳)
  - Yantai (燕泰), second son
- Mistress, of the Li clan (李氏)
- Mistress, of the Hešeri clan, daughter of Nartai (纳尔泰)
  - Zha'ertu, Third Class Bulwark General (三等辅国将军 扎尔图; 9 September 1674 – 25 November 1724), third son
- Mistress, of the Li clan
- Mistress, of the Wang clan (王氏)
- Mistress, of the Hešeri clan, daughter of Hese (赫瑟)
- Mistress, of the Nara clan, daughter of Nadai (纳岱)
- Mistress, of the Niohuru clan
- Mistress, of the Su clan (苏氏)
- Mistress, of the Xiang clan (相氏)
- Concubine, of the Liu clan (刘氏)
- Concubine, of the Yang clan (杨氏)

== Ancestry ==
Ancestors of Giyesu

Nurhaci
Daishan
Tunggiya Hahana Jacing (佟佳哈哈纳扎青)
Huse
Yehe Nara Subenzhu (叶赫那拉.苏本珠), primary consort
Giyesu
Primary consort, of the Khorchin Borjigin clan

== In fiction ==
Prince Kang appears as a minor character in the novel The Deer and the Cauldron by Louis Cha. In the novel, he befriends the protagonist, Wei Xiaobao, and becomes one of Wei's closest allies in the Qing imperial court.

== See also ==
- Prince Li (禮)
- Royal and noble ranks of the Qing dynasty#Male members
