= Mandahai =

- Prince Xun of the First Rank 和碩巽親王

Prince Xun of the First Rank
- Tenure: 1648–1652
- Predecessor: Daišan (as Prince Li of the First Rank)
- Successor: Canggadai
- Born: 30 April 1622
- Died: 15 March 1652 (aged 29)
- Spouse: Lady Borjigit (博爾濟吉特氏); Lady Irgen Gioro (伊爾根覺羅氏)
- Issue: Canggadai; Lengsaiyi (楞塞宜)
Names
- Mandahai (滿達海)
Posthumous name
- Prince Xunjian of the First Rank (巽簡親王) (revoked in 1659)
- House: Aisin Gioro
- Father: Daišan
- Mother: Lady Yehe Nara (葉赫納喇氏)

Mandahai (Manchu: ᠮᠠᠨᡩᠠᡥᠠᡳ, Chinese: 滿達海; 30 April 1622 – 15 March 1652), posthumous name Prince Xunjian of the First Rank, was an imperial prince of the Qing dynasty of China. He was the seventh son of Daišan and in 1649 he inherited his father's princedom. In 1659, the Shunzhi Emperor revoked Mandahai's princely title and demoted his noble rank to beile.

== Life ==
Mandahai was born in the Aisin Gioro clan on 30 April 1622 as the seventh son of Daišan.

His mother was Daišan's princess consort Lady Yehe Nara, who also bore the eighth son, Hūse. He would join his father and uncles in military campaigns. He accompanied his father to the siege of Jinzhou in 1640. In the following year, he was given the title of bulwark duke.

He participated in the Battle of Shanhai Pass under Dorgon, which was a decisive battle leading to the beginning of Qing dynasty rule in China proper. Mandahai was promoted for his services to the rank of Prince of the Fourth Rank in 1644. In the next year, he joined his uncle, Ajige, in pursuit of the rebel leader Li Zicheng.

In 1649 he inherited his father's princedom. The peerage was renamed to Prince Xun of the First Rank. He was posthumously honoured as Prince Xun Jian of the First Rank (巽簡親王). His posthumous rank was demoted and name changed to a title of a beile.

After his death, Mandahai was accused of confiscating a part of Dorgon's property and was posthumously demoted. His son, Canggadai, was demoted to a prince of the third degree.

== Family ==
Primary Consort

- Primary consort, of Khorchin Borjigit (嫡福晉 博爾濟吉特氏)
  - Chang'adai, Prince Xun of the First Rank (已革巽親王 常阿岱;(21 November 1643 - 29 May 1665), first son
- Primary consort, of Irgen Gioro clan (嫡福晉 伊爾根覺羅氏)

Secondary Consort

- Secondary consort, of Qite clan (側福晉 奇特氏)

Concubine

- Mistress, of Šušu Gioro clan (舒舒覺羅氏)
  - Lengsaiyi (楞塞宜), second son
- Mistress, of Wu clan (吳氏)

== Ancestry ==
Taksi (1543–1583)
Empress Yi
Nurhaci (1559–1626)
Empress Xuan (d. 1569)
Daišan(1583-1648)
Consort Yuan of the Tunggiya clan (1569-1592)
Mandahai
Lady Yehe Nara

== See also ==
- Royal and noble ranks of the Qing dynasty § Male members
- Ranks of imperial consorts in China § Qing
- Prince Xun
