= Eight Banners =

Military and administrative divisions of the Qing dynasty

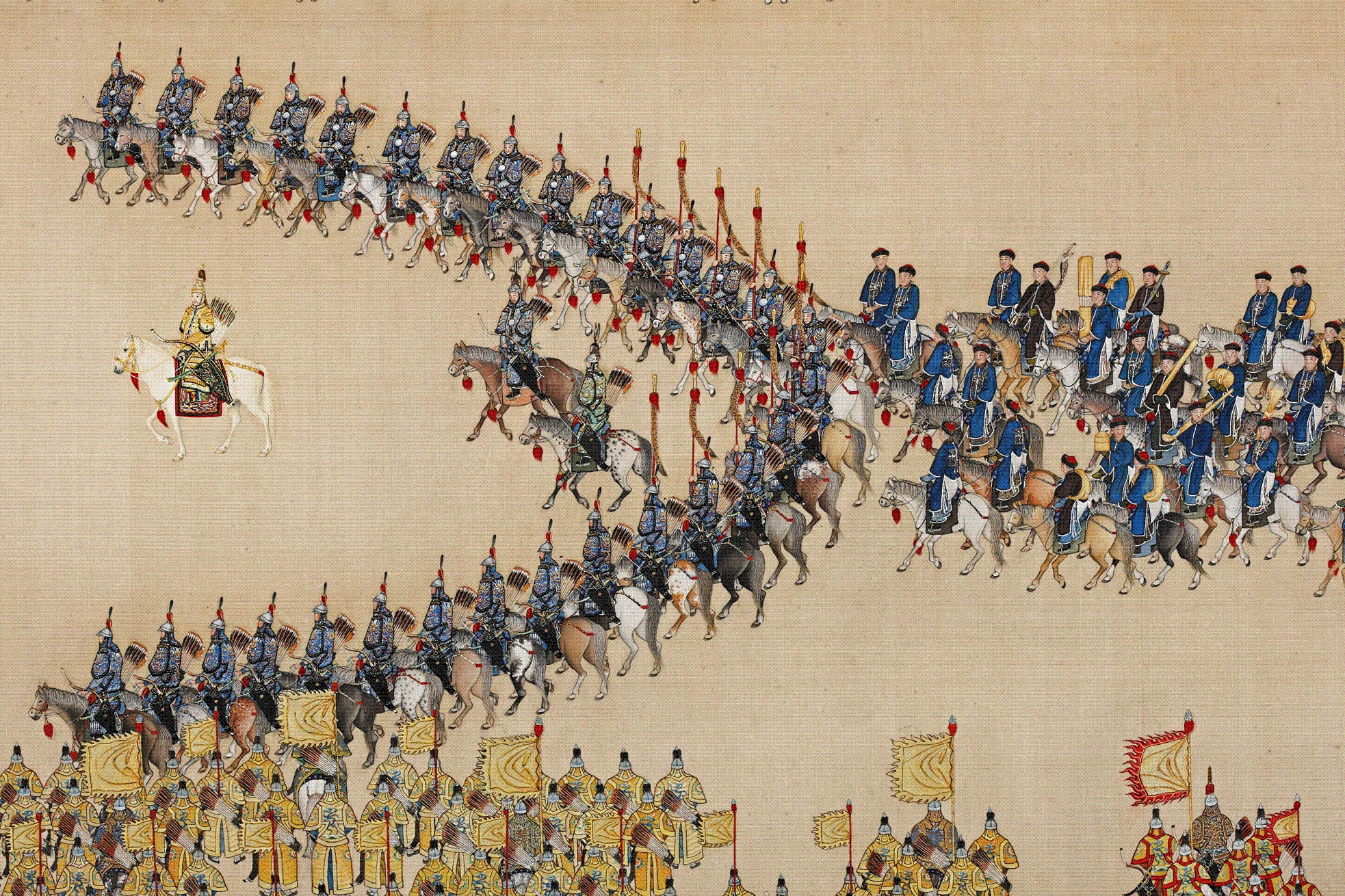
- Qianlong Emperor inspecting Eight Banners
- Country: China
- Allegiance: Later Jin; Qing dynasty
- Type: Artillery; Cavalry; Infantry; Musketeers
- Engagements: Later Jin invasion of Joseon; Qing conquest of Ming; Battle of Ningyuan; Battle of Shanhai Pass; Qing invasion of Joseon; Revolt of the Three Feudatories; Ten Great Campaigns; First Opium War; Second Opium War; Taiping Rebellion; Boxer Rebellion; Xinhai Revolution; Sino-Burmese War

Eight Banners

Chinese name
- Chinese: 八旗
Transcriptions
Standard Mandarin
- Hanyu Pinyin: bāqí
- Wade–Giles: pa^{1}-ch'i^{2}
Southern Min
- Hokkien POJ: Pat-kî

Mongolian name
- Mongolian Cyrillic: Найман хошуу
- Mongolian script: ᠨᠠᠶᠢᠮᠠᠨ ᠬᠣᠰᠢᠭᠤ
Transcriptions
- SASM/GNC: naiman khoshuu

Manchu name
- Manchu script: ᠵᠠᡴᡡᠨ ᡤᡡᠰᠠ
- Romanization: jakūn gūsa

The Eight Banners (in Manchu: ᠵᠠᡴᡡᠨ
ᡤᡡᠰᠠ jakūn gūsa, Chinese: 八旗; pinyin: bāqí; Wade–Giles: pa^{1}-ch'i^{2}, Mongolian: ᠨᠠᠶᠢᠮᠠᠨ
ᠬᠣᠰᠢᠭᠤ) were administrative and military divisions under the Later Jin and Qing dynasties of China into which all Manchu households were placed. In war, the Eight Banners functioned as armies, but the banner system was also the basic organizational framework of all of Manchu society. Created in the early 17th century by Nurhaci, the banner armies played an instrumental role in his unification of the fragmented Jurchen people (who would later be renamed the "Manchu" under Nurhaci's son Hong Taiji) and in the Qing dynasty's conquest of the Ming dynasty.

As Mongol and Han forces were incorporated into the growing Qing military establishment, the Mongol Eight Banners and Han Eight Banners were created alongside the original Manchu banners. The banner armies were considered the elite forces of the Qing military, while the remainder of imperial troops were incorporated into the vast Green Standard Army. Membership in the banners became hereditary, and bannermen were granted land and income. After the defeat of the Ming dynasty, Qing emperors continued to rely on the Eight Banners in their subsequent military campaigns. After the Ten Great Campaigns of the mid-18th century the quality of the banner armies declined. Their failure to suppress the Taiping Rebellion of the mid-19th century ruined their reputation. By the late 19th century the task of defending the empire had largely fallen upon regional armies such as the Xiang Army. Over time, the Eight Banners became synonymous with Manchu identity even as their military strength vanished.

== History ==
=== Establishment ===
Initially, Nurhaci's forces were organized into small hunting parties of about a dozen men related by blood, marriage, clan, or place of residence, as was the typical Jurchen custom. In 1601, with the number of men under his command growing, Nurhaci reorganized his troops into companies of 300 households. Five companies made up a battalion, and ten battalions a banner. Four banners were originally created: Yellow, White, Red, and Blue, each named after the color of its flag. By 1614, the number of companies had grown to around 400. In 1615, the number of banners was doubled through the creation of "bordered" banners. The troops of each of the original four banners would be split between a plain and a bordered banner. The bordered variant of each flag was to have a red border, except for the Bordered Red Banner, which had a white border instead.

The banner armies expanded rapidly after a string of military victories under Nurhaci and his successors. Beginning in the late 1620s, the Jurchens incorporated allied and conquered Mongol tribes into the Eight Banner system. In 1635, Hong Taiji, son of Nurhaci, renamed his people from Jurchen to Manchu. That same year the Mongols were separated into the Mongol Eight Banners (Manchu: ᠮᠣᠩᡤᠣ
ᡤᡡᠰᠠ, monggo gūsa; Chinese: 八旗蒙古; pinyin: bāqí ménggǔ; Mongolian: Монгол найман хошуу).

=== Rewards and Privileges ===
The Eight Banners (in Manchu: ᠵᠠᡴᡡᠨ
ᡤᡡᠰᠠ jakūn gūsa, Chinese: 八旗; pinyin: bāqí; Wade–Giles: pa^{1}-ch'i^{2}, Mongolian: ᠨᠠᠶᠢᠮᠠᠨ
ᠬᠣᠰᠢᠭᠤ) provided very important material, legal, and social privileges during the Qing Dynasty in China. Bannermen received state stipends, land allocations, grain rations, and housing in selected garrison quarters that were mostly in Beijing. Rather than relying on the damages of war after the early conquest period, the Qing state developed a salaried system that allowed bannermen and their households to have a regular income. Banner status also created an important legal separation and bannermen were governed by banner courts and internal disciplinary systems that were in place. These were separate from the regular civilian administration at that time which also reinforced their identity as a distinct military administrative estate within the Qing Dynasty.

If someone was affiliated with the banners then they were provided access to employment, officeholding, and imperial favor especially for those in the Upper Three Banners under direct imperial control. Over time people with banner membership became a key marker of Manchu identity and preserved cultural practices while integrating different ethnic groups into the Qing imperial system. Although the bannermen were important for the Manchus, by the nineteenth century the cost of maintaining stipends for the hereditary banner population strained the imperial treasury. With that the banner status still held onto the symbolic prestige that is held earlier but many bannermen experienced economic decline.

=== Invasions of Korea ===
Under Hong Taiji, the banner armies participated in two invasions of Joseon in the Korean Peninsula first in 1627 and again in 1636. As a consequence, Joseon was forced to end its relationship with the Ming and become a Qing tributary instead.

=== Conquest of the Ming dynasty ===
Initially, Han troops were incorporated into the existing Manchu Banners. When Hong Taiji captured Yongping in 1629, a contingent of artillerymen surrendered to him. In 1631, these troops were organized into the so-called Old Han Army under the Han commander Tong Yangxing. These artillery units were used decisively to defeat Ming general Zu Dashou's forces at the siege of Dalinghe that same year. In 1636, Hong Taiji proclaimed the creation of the Qing dynasty.

Between 1637 and 1642, the Old Han Army, mostly made up of Liaodong natives who had surrendered at Yongping, Fushun, Dalinghe, etc., were organized into the Han Eight Banners (Manchu: ᠨᡳᡴᠠᠨ
ᠴᠣᠣᡥᠠ nikan cooha or ᡠᠵᡝᠨ
ᠴᠣᠣᡥᠠ ujen cooha; Chinese: 八旗漢軍; pinyin: bāqí hànjūn; Mongolian: Хятад найман хошуу). The original Eight Banners were thereafter referred to as the Manchu Eight Banners (Manchu: ᠮᠠᠨᠵᡠ
ᡤᡡᠰᠠ, manju gūsa; Chinese: 八旗滿洲; pinyin: bāqí mǎnzhōu; Mongolian: Манжийн Найман хошуу). Although still called the "Eight Banners" in name, there were now effectively twenty-four banner armies, eight for each of the three main ethnic groups (Manchu, Mongol, and Han).

Among the Banners gunpowder weapons, such as muskets and artillery, were specifically wielded by the Han Banners.

After Hong Taiji's death, Dorgon, commander of the Solid White Banner, became regent. He quickly purged his rivals and took control over Hong Taiji's Solid Blue Banner. By 1644, an estimated two million people were living in the Eight Banners system. That year, rebels led by Li Zicheng captured Beijing, and the last emperor of the Ming dynasty, Chongzhen, committed suicide. Dorgon and his bannermen joined forces with Ming defector Wu Sangui to defeat Li at the Battle of Shanhai Pass and secure Beijing for the Qing. The young Shunzhi Emperor was then enthroned in the Forbidden City.

Ming defectors played a major role in the Qing conquest of the Central Plain. Ethnic Han generals who defected to the Qing were often given women from the imperial Aisin Gioro family in marriage while the ordinary soldiers who defected were given non-royal Manchu women as wives. The Qing differentiated between Han bannermen and ordinary Han civilians. Han bannermen were made out of ethnic Han who defected to the Qing up to 1644 and joined the Eight Banners, giving them social and legal privileges in addition to being acculturated to Manchu culture. So many Han defected to the Qing and swelled up the ranks of the Eight Banners that ethnic Manchus became a minority within the Banners, making up only 16% in 1648, with Han bannermen dominating with 75% and Mongol bannermen making up the rest. It was this multi-ethnic force, in which Manchus were only a minority, which conquered the Central Plain for the Qing. Hong Taiji recognized that Han defectors were needed by the Qing in order to assist in the conquest of the Ming, explaining to other Manchus why he needed to treat the Ming defector General Hung Ch'eng-ch'ou leniently.

The Qing showed in propaganda targeted towards the Ming military that the Qing valued military skills to get them to defect to the Qing, since the Ming civilian political system discriminated against the military. The three Liaodong Han Bannermen officers who played a massive role in the conquest of southern China from the Ming were Shang Kexi, Geng Zhongming, and Kong Youde and they governed southern China autonomously as viceroys for the Qing after their conquests. Normally the Manchu Bannermen acted as reserve forces while the Qing foremost used defected Han troops to fight as the vanguard during their conquest of the Central Plain.

The Liaodong Han military frontiersmen were prone to mixing and acculturating with (non-Han) tribesmen. The Mongol officer Mangui served in the Ming military and fought the Manchus, dying in battle against a Manchu raid. The Manchus accepted and assimilated Han soldiers who defected. Liaodong Han transfrontiersmen soldiers acculturated to Manchu culture and used Manchu names. Manchus lived in cities with walls surrounded by villages and adopted Han-style agriculture before the Qing conquest of the Ming. The Han transfrontismen abandoned their Han names and identities and Nurhaci's secretary Dahai might have been one of them.

When Dorgon ordered Han civilians to vacate Beijing's inner city and move to the outskirts, he resettled the inner city with the Bannermen, including Han bannermen, later, some exceptions were made to allowing to reside in the inner city Han civilians who held government or commercial jobs.

The Qing relied on the Green Standard soldiers, made out of defected Ming military forces who joined the Qing, in order to help rule northern China. It was Green Standard Han troops who actively military governed China locally while Han Bannermen, Mongol Bannermen, and Manchu Bannermen who were only brought into emergency situations where there was sustained military resistance.

Manchu Aisin Gioro princesses were also married to Han official's sons.

The Manchu Prince Regent Dorgon gave a Manchu woman as a wife to the Han official Feng Quan, who had defected from the Ming to the Qing. The Manchu queue hairstyle was willingly adopted by Feng Quan before it was enforced on the Han population and Feng learned the Manchu language.

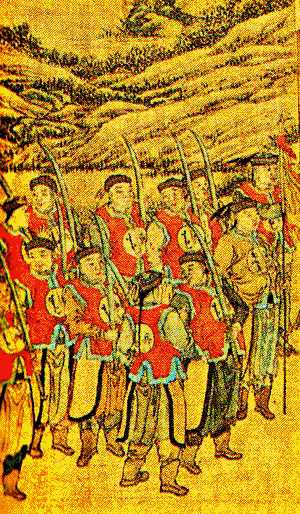
Banners of late 17th century

To promote ethnic harmony, a 1648 decree from the Shunzhi Emperor allowed Han civilian men to marry Manchu women from the Banners with the permission of the Board of Revenue if they were registered daughters of officials or commoners or the permission of their banner company captain if they were unregistered commoners. It was only later in the dynasty that these policies allowing intermarriage were done away with. The decree was formulated by Dorgon.

The Guangzhou massacre of Ming loyalist Han forces and civilians in 1650 by Qing forces, was entirely carried out by Han Bannermen led by Han generals Shang Kexi and Geng Jimao.

The Qing sent Han Bannermen to fight against Koxinga's Ming loyalists in Fujian. The Qing carried out massive depopulation policy clearances forcing people to evacuated the coast in order to deprive Koxinga's Ming loyalists of resources, this has led to a myth that it was because Manchus were "afraid of water". In Fujian, it was Han Bannermen who were the ones carrying out the fighting and killing for the Qing and this disproved the entirely irrelevant claim that alleged fear of the water on part of the Manchus had to do with the coastal evacuation and clearances. Even though a poem refers to the soldiers carrying out massacres in Fujian as "barbarian", both Han Green Standard Army and Han Bannermen were involved in the fighting for the Qing side and carried out the worst slaughter. 400,000 Green Standard Army soldiers were used against the Three Feudatories besides 200,000 Bannermen.

=== Revolt of the Three Feudatories ===
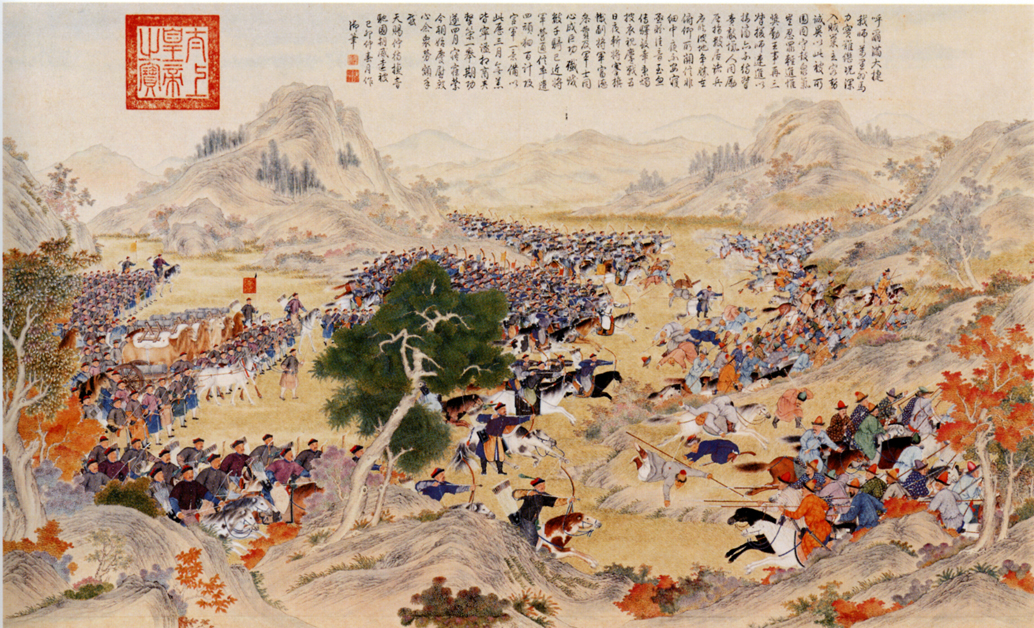
Battle of Qurman, 1759

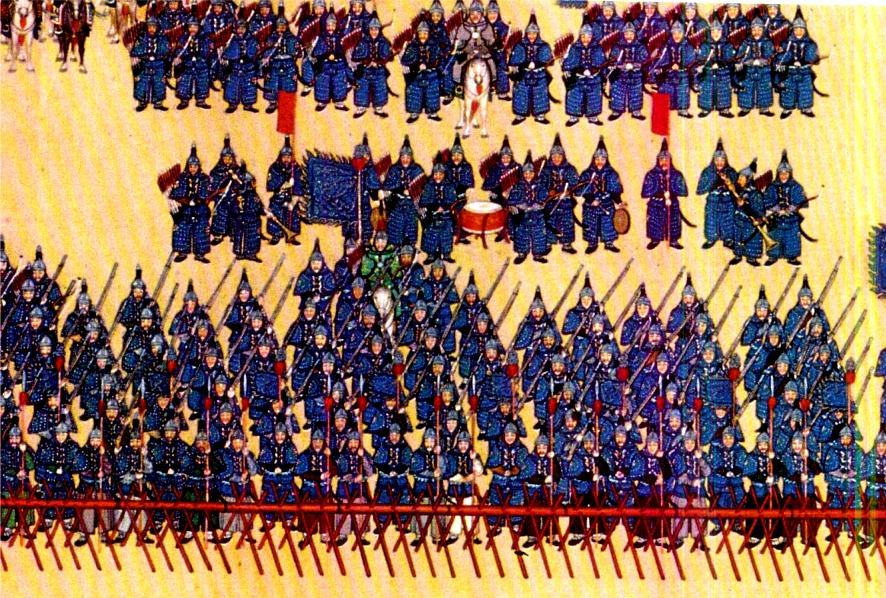
Soldiers of the Blue banner during the reign of the Qianlong Emperor.

In the Revolt of the Three Feudatories Manchu Generals and Bannermen were initially put to shame by the better performance of the Han Green Standard Army, who fought better than them against the rebels and this was noted by the Kangxi Emperor, leading him to task Generals Sun Sike, Wang Jinbao, and Zhao Liangdong to lead Green Standard soldiers to crush the rebels. The Qing thought that Han were superior at battling other Han people and so used the Green Standard Army as the dominant and majority army in crushing the rebels instead of Bannermen, and as such, In northwestern China against Wang Fuchen, the Qing put Bannermen in the rear as reserves while they used Han Green Standard Army soldiers and Han Generals like Zhang Liangdong, Wang Jinbao, and Zhang Yong as the primary military forces, and these Han generals achieved victory over the rebels. Sichuan and southern Shaanxi were retaken by the Han Green Standard Army under Wang Jinbao and Zhao Liangdong in 1680, with Manchus only participating in dealing with logistics and provisions. 400,000 Green Standard Army soldiers and 150,000 Bannermen served on the Qing side during the war. 213 Han Banner companies, and 527 companies of Mongol and Manchu Banners were mobilized by the Qing during the revolt.

The Qing forces were crushed by Wu from 1673 to 1674. The Qing had the support of the majority of Han soldiers and Han elite against the Three Feudatories, since they refused to join Wu Sangui in the revolt, while the Eight Banners and Manchu officers fared poorly against Wu Sangui, so the Qing responded with using a massive army of more than 900,000 Han (non-Banner) instead of the Eight Banners, to fight and crush the Three Feudatories. Wu Sangui's forces were crushed by the Green Standard Army, made out of defected Ming soldiers.

=== Territorial expansion ===
Koxinga's rattan shield troops became famous for fighting and defeating the Dutch in Taiwan. After the surrender of Koxinga's former followers on Taiwan, Koxinga's grandson Zheng Keshuang and his troops were incorporated into the Eight Banners. His rattan shield soldiers (Tengpaiying) 藤牌营 were used against the Russian Cossacks at Albazin.

Under the Kangxi and Qianlong emperors, the Eight Banners participated in a series of military campaigns to subdue Ming loyalists and neighboring states. In the Qianlong Emperor's celebrated Ten Great Campaigns, the banner armies fought alongside troops of the Green Standard Army, expanding the Qing empire to its greatest territorial extent. Though partly successful, the campaigns were a heavy financial burden on the Qing treasury, and exposed weaknesses in the Qing military. Many bannermen lost their lives in the Burma campaign, often as the result of tropical diseases, to which they had little resistance. In combat, while the bannermen troops could match Burmese and Vietnamese forces in open field, they were often outflanked and ambushed by the local forces. Furthermore, Burmese and Vietnamese war elephants terrified the horses of bannermen cavalry, leaving the banner infantry vulnerable.

=== Later history ===
Although the banners were instrumental in the transition from Ming to Qing in the 17th century, they began to fall behind rising Western powers in the 18th century. By the 1730s, Bannermen neglected their military duties, preferring to spend their salaries on gambling and entertainment. Subsidizing the 1.5 million men, women and children in the system was an expensive proposition, compounded by embezzlement and corruption. Destitution in the northeastern garrisons led many Manchu Bannermen to abandon their posts and in response the Qing government either sentenced them with penal slavery or death.

In the 19th century, the Eight Banners and Green Standard troops proved unable to put down the Taiping Rebellion and Nian Rebellion on their own. Regional officials like Zeng Guofan were instructed to raise their own forces from the civilian population, leading to the creation of the Xiang Army and the Huai Army, among others. Along with the Ever Victorious Army of Frederick Townsend Ward, it was these warlord armies (known as yongying) who finally succeeded in restoring Qing control in this turbulent period.

John Ross, a Scots missionary who served in Manchuria in the 19th century, wrote of the bannermen, "Their claim to be military men is based on their descent rather than on their skill in arms; and their pay is given them because of their fathers' prowess, and not at all from any hopes of their efficiency as soldiers. Their soldierly qualities are included in the accomplishments of idleness, riding, and the use of the bow and arrow, at which they practice on a few rare occasions each year."

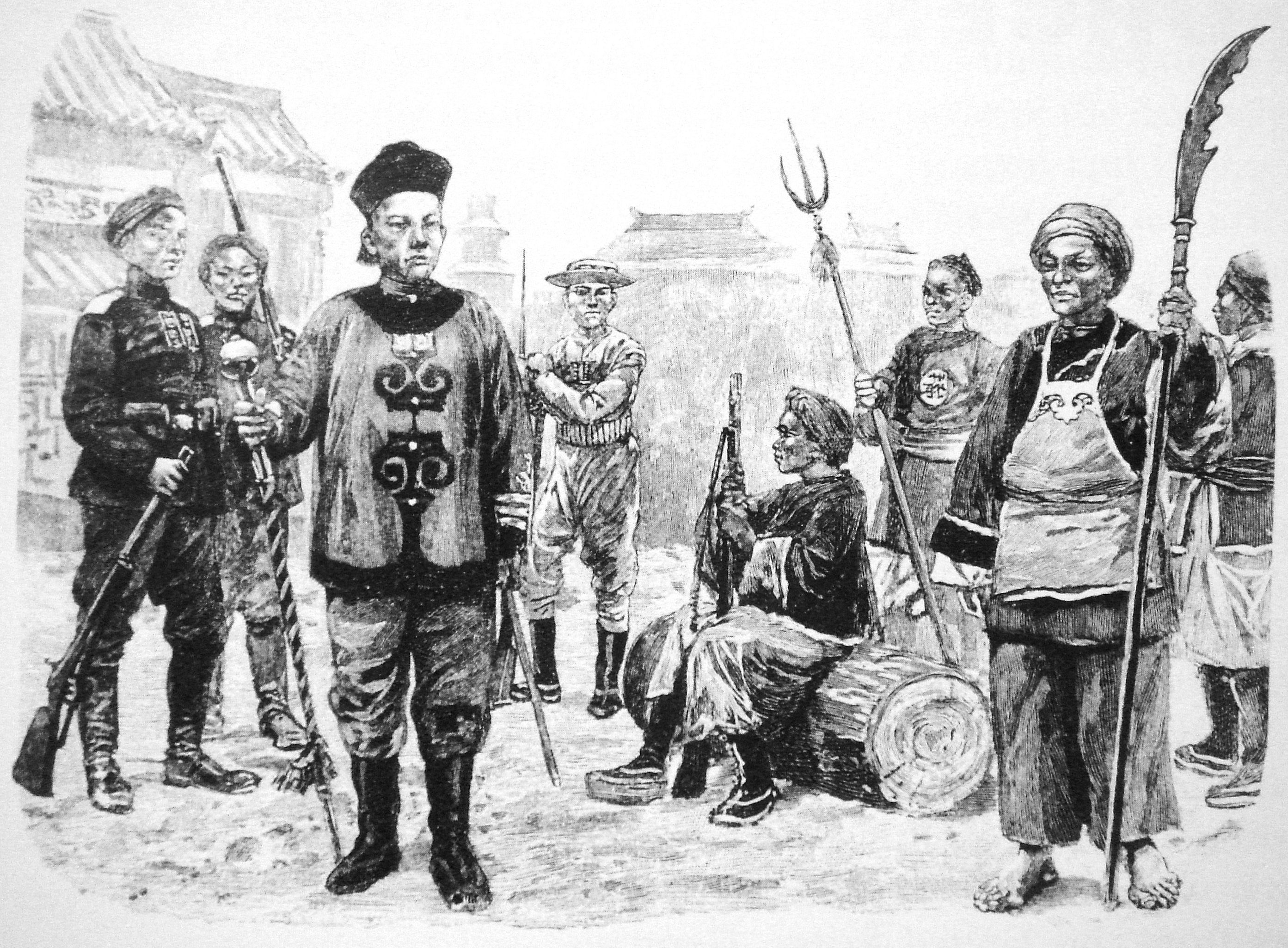
Chinese soldiers in Boxer Rebellion; the left is a Bannerman

During the Boxer Rebellion, 1899–1901, the European powers recruited 10,000 Bannermen from the Metropolitan Banners into Wuwei Corps and gave them modernized training and weapons. One of these was the Hushenying. However, many Manchu Bannermen in Beijing supported the Boxers and shared their anti-foreign sentiment. The pro-Boxer Bannermen sustained heavy casualties and subsequently were driven into desperate poverty.

Zhao Erfeng and Zhao Erxun were two important Han Bannermen in the late Qing.

By the late 19th century, the Qing Dynasty began training and creating New Army units based on Western training, equipment and organization. Nevertheless, the banner system remained in existence until the fall of the Qing in 1912, and even beyond, with a rump organization continuing to function until 1924.

At the end of the Qing dynasty, all members of the Eight Banners, regardless of their original ethnicity, were considered by the Republic of China to be Manchu.

Han Bannermen became an elite political class in Fengtian province in the late Qing period and into the Republican era.

In addition to sending Han exiles convicted of crimes to Xinjiang to be slaves of Banner garrisons there, the Qing also practiced reverse exile, exiling Inner Asian (Mongol, Russian and Muslim criminals from Mongolia and Inner Asia) to China proper where they would serve as slaves in Han Banner garrisons in Guangzhou. Russians, Oirats and Muslims (Oros. Ulet. Hoise jergi weilengge niyalma) such as Yakov and Dmitri were exiled to the Han banner garrison in Guangzhou. In the 1780s, after the Jahriyya revolt in Gansu started by Zhang Wenqing (張文慶) was defeated, Muslims like Ma Jinlu (馬進祿) were exiled to the Han Banner garrison in Guangzhou to become slaves to Han Banner officers. The Qing code regulating Mongols in Mongolia sentenced Mongol criminals to exile and to become slaves to Han bannermen in Han Banner garrisons in China proper.

== Organization ==
At the highest level, the eight banners were categorized according to two groupings. The three "upper" banners (both Yellow Banners and the Plain White Banner) were under the nominal command of the emperor himself, whereas the five "lower" banners were commanded by others. The banners were also split into a "left wing" and a "right wing" according to how they would be arrayed in battle. In Beijing, the left wing occupied the eastern banner neighborhoods and the right wing occupied the western ones.

The Eight Banners in formation for the Qianlong Emperor's Grand Review. Left wing banners are depicted on the viewer's right side, right wing on the left.

The smallest unit in a banner army was the company, or niru (Chinese: 佐領; pinyin: zuǒlǐng, Mongolian: Сум), composed nominally of 300 soldiers and their families. The term niru means "arrow" in the Manchu language, and was originally the Manchu name for a hunting party, which would be armed with bows and arrows. Fifteen companies (4,500 men) made up one jalan (Chinese: 參領; pinyin: cānlǐng; Mongolian: Залан). Four jalan constituted a gūsa (banner, Chinese: 旗; pinyin: qí, Mongolian: Хошуу), with a total of 60 companies, or 18,000 men. The actual sizes often varied substantially from these standards.

gūsa	jalan	niru
ᡤᡡᠰᠠ	ᠵᠠᠯᠠᠨ	ᠨᡳᡵᡠ

Banner	English	Manchu	Mongolian	Chinese	L/R	U/L
	Bordered Yellow Banner	ᡴᡠᠪᡠᡥᡝ ᠰᡠᠸᠠᠶᠠᠨ ᡤᡡᠰᠠ kubuhe suwayan gūsa	ᠬᠥᠪᠡᠭᠡᠲᠦ ᠰᠢᠷᠠ ᠬᠣᠰᠢᠭᠤ köbegetü sir-a qosiɣu	鑲黃旗 xiānghuángqí	Left	Upper
	Plain Yellow Banner	ᡤᡠᠯᡠ ᠰᡠᠸᠠᠶᠠᠨ ᡤᡡᠰᠠ gulu suwayan gūsa	ᠰᠢᠯᠤᠭᠤᠨ ᠰᠢᠷᠠ ᠬᠣᠰᠢᠭᠤ siluɣun sir-a qosiɣu	正黃旗 zhènghuángqí	Right	Upper
	Bordered White Banner	ᡴᡠᠪᡠᡥᡝ ᡧᠠᠩᡤᡳᠶᠠᠨ ᡤᡡᠰᠠ kubuhe šanggiyan gūsa	ᠬᠥᠪᠡᠭᠡᠲᠦ ᠴᠠᠭᠠᠨ ᠬᠣᠰᠢᠭᠤ köbegetü čaɣan qosiɣu	鑲白旗 xiāngbáiqí	Left	Lower
	Plain White Banner	ᡤᡠᠯᡠ ᡧᠠᠩᡤᡳᠶᠠᠨ ᡤᡡᠰᠠ gulu šanggiyan gūsa	ᠰᠢᠯᠤᠭᠤᠨ ᠴᠠᠭᠠᠨ ᠬᠣᠰᠢᠭᠤ siluɣun čaɣan qosiɣu	正白旗 zhèngbáiqí	Left	Upper
	Bordered Red Banner	ᡴᡠᠪᡠᡥᡝ ᡶᡠᠯᡤᡳᠶᠠᠨ ᡤᡡᠰᠠ kubuhe fulgiyan gūsa	ᠬᠥᠪᠡᠭᠡᠲᠦ ᠤᠯᠠᠭᠠᠨ ᠬᠣᠰᠢᠭᠤ köbegetü ulaɣan qosiɣu	鑲紅旗 xiānghóngqí	Right	Lower
	Plain Red Banner	ᡤᡠᠯᡠ ᡶᡠᠯᡤᡳᠶᠠᠨ ᡤᡡᠰᠠ gulu fulgiyan gūsa	ᠰᠢᠯᠤᠭᠤᠨ ᠤᠯᠠᠭᠠᠨ ᠬᠣᠰᠢᠭᠤ siluɣun ulaɣan qosiɣu	正紅旗 zhènghóngqí	Right	Lower
	Bordered Blue Banner	ᡴᡠᠪᡠᡥᡝ ᠯᠠᠮᡠᠨ ᡤᡡᠰᠠ kubuhe lamun gūsa	ᠬᠥᠪᠡᠭᠡᠲᠦ ᠬᠥᠬᠡ ᠬᠣᠰᠢᠭᠤ köbegetü köke qosiɣu	鑲藍旗 xiānglánqí	Right	Lower
	Plain Blue Banner	ᡤᡠᠯᡠ ᠯᠠᠮᡠᠨ ᡤᡡᠰᠠ gulu lamun gūsa	ᠰᠢᠯᠤᠭᠤᠨ ᠬᠥᠬᠡ ᠬᠣᠰᠢᠭᠤ siluɣun köke qosiɣu	正藍旗 zhènglánqí	Left	Lower

=== Ethnic composition ===
Initially, the banner armies were primarily made up of individuals from the various Manchu tribes. As new populations were incorporated into the empire, the armies were expanded to accommodate troops of different ethnicities. The banner armies would eventually encompass three principal ethnic components: the Manchus, the Han, and the Mongols, and various smaller ethnic groups, such as the Xibe, the Daur, and the Evenks.

When the Jurchens were reorganized by Nurhaci into the Eight Banners, many Manchu clans were artificially created by groups of unrelated people who founded a new Manchu clan (mukun) using a geographic origin name such as a toponym for their hala (clan name).

There were stories of Han migrating to the Jurchens and assimilating into Manchu Jurchen society and Nikan Wailan may have been an example of this. The Manchu Cuigiya 崔佳氏 clan claimed that a Han Chinese founded their clan. The Tohoro 托和啰 (Duanfang's clan) claimed Han Chinese origin. The Han Chinese Banner Tong 佟 clan of Fushun in Liaoning falsely claimed to be related to the Jurchen Manchu Tunggiya 佟佳 clan of Jilin, using this false claim to get themselves transferred to a Manchu banner in the reign of the Kangxi emperor.

The transfer of families from Han Banners or Bondservant status (Booi Aha) to Manchu Banners, switching their ethnicity from Han to Manchu was called Taiqi (抬旗) in Chinese. They would be transferred to the "upper three" Manchu Banners. It was a policy of the Qing to transfer to immediate families (the brothers, father) of the mother of an Emperor into the upper three Manchu Banners and having "giya" 佳 appended to the end of their surname to Manchufy it. It typically occurred in cases of intermarriage with the Qing Aisin Gioro Imperial family, and the close relatives (fathers and brothers) of the concubine or Empress would get promoted from the Han Banner to the Manchu Banner and become Manchu. The Han Bannerwoman Empress Xiaoyichun and her entire family were transferred to the Manchu Banners due to her status as the mother of an Emperor and their surname was change from Wei 魏 to Weigiya 魏佳.

The Qing said that "Manchu and Han are one house" 滿漢一家 and said that the difference was "not between Manchu and Han, but instead between Bannerman and civilian" 不分滿漢，但問旗民 or 但問旗民，不問滿漢.

Select groups of Han Chinese bannermen were mass transferred into Manchu Banners by the Qing, changing their ethnicity from Han Chinese to Manchu. Han Chinese bannermen of Tai Nikan 台尼堪 (watchpost Chinese) and Fusi Nikan 撫順尼堪 (Fushun Chinese) backgrounds into the Manchu banners in 1740 by order of the Qing Qianlong emperor. It was between 1618-1629 when the Han Chinese from Liaodong who later became the Fushun Nikan and Tai Nikan defected to the Jurchens (Manchus).

Manchu families adopted Han Chinese sons from families of bondservant Booi Aha (baoyi) origin and they served in Manchu company registers as detached household Manchus and the Qing imperial court found this out in 1729. Manchu Bannermen who needed money helped falsify registration for Han Chinese servants being adopted into the Manchu banners and Manchu families who lacked sons were allowed to adopt their servant's sons or servants themselves. The Manchu families were paid to adopt Han Chinese sons from bondservant families by those families. The Qing Imperial Guard captain Batu was furious at the Manchus who adopted Han Chinese as their sons from slave and bondservant families in exchange for money and expressed his displeasure at them adopting Han Chinese instead of other Manchus. These Han Chinese who infiltrated the Manchu Banners by adoption were known as "secondary-status bannermen" and "false Manchus" or "separate-register Manchus", and there were eventually so many of these Han Chinese that they took over military positions in the Banners which previously were reserved for Jurchen Manchus. Han Chinese foster-son and separate register bannermen made up 800 out of 1,600 soldiers of the Mongol Banners and Manchu Banners of Hangzhou in 1740 which was nearly 50%. Han Chinese foster-son made up 220 out of 1,600 unsalaried troops at Jingzhou in 1747 and an assortment of Han Chinese separate-register, Mongol, and Manchu bannermen were the remainder. Han Chinese secondary status bannermen made up 180 of 3,600 troop households in Ningxia while Han Chinese separate registers made up 380 out of 2,700 Manchu soldiers in Liangzhou. The result of these Han Manchus taking up military positions resulted in many Jurchen Manchus being deprived of their traditional positions as soldiers in the Banner armies, resulting in the Han Manchus supplanting Jurchen Manchus economic and social status. These Han Manchus were said to be good military troops and their skills at marching and archery were up to par so that the Zhapu lieutenant general couldn't differentiate them from Jurchen Manchus in terms of military skills. Manchu Banners contained a lot of "false Manchus" who were from Han Chinese civilian families but were adopted by Manchu bannermen after the Yongzheng reign. The Jingkou and Jiangning Mongol banners and Manchu Banners had 1,795 adopted Han Chinese and the Beijing Mongol Banners and Manchu Banners had 2,400 adopted Han Chinese in statistics taken from the 1821 census. Despite Qing attempts to differentiate adopted Han Chinese from normal Manchu bannermen the differences between them became hazy. These adopted Han Chinese bondservants who managed to get themselves onto Manchu banner roles were called kaihu ren (開戶人) in Chinese and dangse faksalaha urse in Manchu. Normal Manchus were called jingkini Manjusa.

Commoner Manchu bannermen who were not nobility were called irgen which meant common, in contrast to the Manchu nobility o the "Eight Great Houses" who held noble titles.

Jiang Xingzhou 姜興舟, a Han bannerman lieutenant from the Bordered Yellow Banner married a Muslim woman in Mukden during Qianlong's late reign. He fled his position due to fear of being punished for being a bannerman marrying a commoner woman. He was sentenced to death for leaving his official post but the sentence was commuted and he was not executed.

In the late 19th century and early 1900s, intermarriage between Manchus and Han bannermen in the northeast increased as Manchu families were more willing to marry their daughters to sons from well off Han families to trade their ethnic status for higher financial status.

== Banner soldiers ==
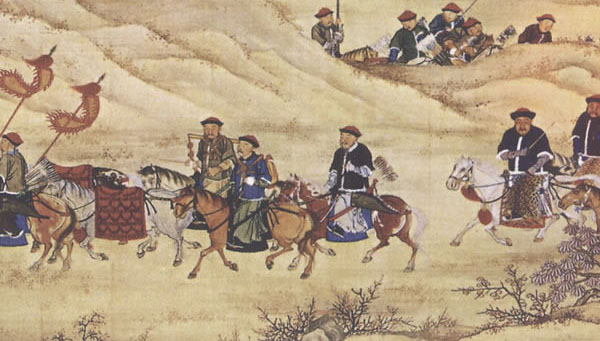
Bannermen accompanying an Imperial hunting party. Hunting served as a military exercise and to improve coordination between military units.

From the time China was brought under the rule of the Qing dynasty, the banner soldiers became more professional and bureaucratized. Once the Manchus took over governing, they could no longer satisfy the material needs of soldiers by garnishing and distributing booty; instead, a salary system was instituted, ranks standardized, and the Eight Banners became a sort of hereditary military caste, though with a strong ethnic inflection. Banner soldiers took up permanent positions, either as defenders of the capital, Beijing, where roughly half of them lived with their families, or in the provinces, where some eighteen garrisons were established. The largest banner garrisons throughout most of the Qing dynasty were at Beijing, followed by Xi'an and Hangzhou. Sizable banner populations were also placed in Manchuria and at strategic points along the Great Wall, the Yangtze River and Grand Canal.

=== Prominent Bannermen ===
- Agui – participated in the Sino-Burmese War and the suppression of the Jinchuan hill peoples. Member of the Plain Blue Banner.
- Fuheng – commander in the Sino-Burmese War. Member of the Bordered Yellow Banner.
- Fuk'anggan – son of Fuheng, commander in the Sino-Nepalese War. Member of the Bordered Yellow Banner.
- Geng Zhongming – Ming dynasty warlord. Inducted into the Chinese Plain Yellow Banner after submitting to Qing.
- Li Yongfang – Ming dynasty frontier commander. Inducted into the Chinese Plain Blue Banner after surrendering to Qing.
- Shi Lang
- Zheng Keshuang – grandson of Koxinga. Inducted into the Chinese Plain Red Banner after surrendering to Qing.
- Zhu Zhiliang – a descendant of the Ming dynasty Imperial Family. Granted the title Marquis of Extended Grace and inducted into the Chinese Plain White Banner.
- Zu Dashou – Ming dynasty frontier commander. Inducted into the Chinese Plain Yellow Banner after surrendering to Qing.

== See also ==
- Han Eight Banners
- Mongol Eight Banners
- Military of the Qing dynasty
- Banners of Inner Mongolia
- Identity in the Eight Banners
- Mongol military tactics and organization
- Darugha
- Ejen
- Qipao
