= Plain Blue Banner =

One of the Manchu Empire eight banners

- Plain Blue Banner
- Active: 1601–1912
- Country: Later Jin; Qing dynasty
- Part of: Eight Banners
- Commander: Šurhaci The Emperor

Plain Blue Banner

Chinese name
- Traditional Chinese: 正藍旗
- Simplified Chinese: 正蓝旗
Transcriptions
Standard Mandarin
- Hanyu Pinyin: zhènglánqí

Mongolian name
- Mongolian Cyrillic: Шулуун хөх хошуу

Manchu name
- Manchu script: ᡤᡠᠯᡠ ᠯᠠᠮᡠᠨ ᡤᡡᠰᠠ
- Romanization: gulu lamun gūsa

The Plain Blue Banner (Chinese: 正藍旗) was one of the Eight Banners of Manchu military and society during the Later Jin and Qing dynasty of China. As part of the original Four Banners before its expansion, the first commander was Surhaci when he was assigned the Plain Blue Banner by his older brother and Jianzhou Jurchen Leader Nurhaci. After Surhaci lost favor, Nurhaci assigned the Plain Blue Banner to his 5th son, Manggūltai. After Nurhaci's death, Daišan used his influence to make the princes and generals to agree on Hong Taiji's accession as Khan. Although Hong Taiji had become Khan, Manggūltai, along with Daišan and Amin continued to take turns as assistant administrators until 1629, when Hong Taiji had begun to consolidate power.

Manggūltai lost favor and rumored to be drunk and drew his knife on Hong Taiji to which he had to hand over the Plain Blue Banner to Hong Taiji, which was the third strongest banner at that time. In this way, Hong Taiji slowly eliminated his competitor's powers. With Daisan also withdrawing his Senior Beile seat next to Hong Taiji, he truly sits alone facing the south direction with superior power above all other beiles.

== Members ==
- Šurhaci (Jurchen leader, younger brother of Nurhaci)
- Manggūltai (Manchu Prince, 5th son of Nurhaci, 3rd amongst the Four Senior Beile)
- Hong Taiji (Manchu Prince, 8th son and hier of Nurhaci, 4th amongst the Four Senior Beile, secured from Manggūltai after he allegedly pull his sword out and threatened the Emperor, consolidated power and formed the first Upper Three Banners: Bordered Yellow, Plain Yellow, Plain Blue)
- Abatai (Manchu Prince, 7th son of Nurhaci)
- Hooge, Prince Su (Manchu Prince, eldest son of Hong Taiji, held control of Plain Blue Banner after his father consolidated power from Manggūltai and formed the Three Upper Banners at that time with the imperial two Yellow Banners and the Plain Blue Banner)
- Ajige (Manchu Prince, 12th son of Nurhaci, held the Plain Blue Banner after Dorgon secured it from Hooge; however, the Upper Three Banners by this time became the Bordered Yellow, Plain Yellow, and Dorgon's personal Plain White)
- Li Yongfang (Ming dynasty frontier commander and first to surrender to the Qing. Inducted into the Chinese Han Plain Blue Banner)
- Li Shuaitai
- Agui (participated in the Sino-Burmese War and the suppression of the Jinchuan hill peoples)
- Zhao Erfeng (Han)
- Keying (official)
- Zhao Erxun

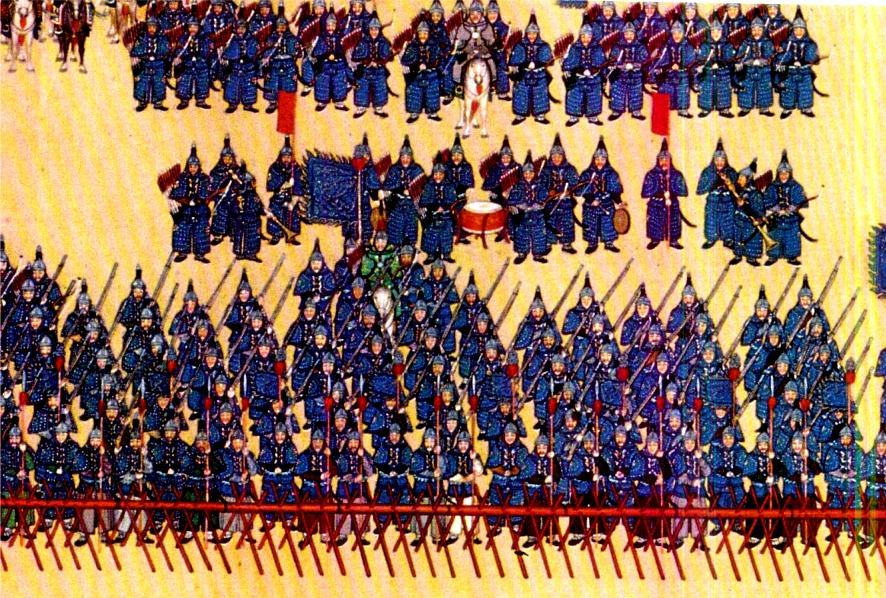
Soldiers of the Plain Blue Banner during the reign of the Qianlong Emperor

== Notable Clans ==
- Aisingioro
- Arute Hala
- Janggiya
- Giorca
- Yehe Nara
- Zhao
- Liugiya
- Li
