= Chu Prefecture (Zhejiang) =

Historical administrative division in Zhejiang, China

- Traditional Chinese: 處州
- Simplified Chinese: 处州
Transcriptions
Standard Mandarin
- Hanyu Pinyin: Chù Zhōu
- Wade–Giles: Ch'u^{4} Chou^{1}

Chuzhou or Chu Prefecture was a zhou (prefecture) in imperial China, centering on modern Lishui, Zhejiang, China. It existed (intermittently) from 589 to 1276, when the Yuan dynasty renamed it Chuzhou Route.
