= Prince Li (禮) =

Prince Li of the First Rank
- Traditional Chinese: 和碩禮親王
- Simplified Chinese: 和硕礼亲王
Transcriptions
Standard Mandarin
- Hanyu Pinyin: héshuò lǐ qīnwáng
- Wade–Giles: ho-shuo li ch'in-wang

Prince Xun of the First Rank
- Traditional Chinese: 和碩巽親王
- Simplified Chinese: 和硕巽亲王
Transcriptions
Standard Mandarin
- Hanyu Pinyin: héshuò xùn qīnwáng
- Wade–Giles: ho-shuo hsün ch'in-wang

Prince Kang of the First Rank
- Traditional Chinese: 和碩康親王
- Simplified Chinese: 和硕康亲王
Transcriptions
Standard Mandarin
- Hanyu Pinyin: héshuò kāng qīnwáng
- Wade–Giles: ho-shuo k'ang ch'in-wang

Prince Li of the First Rank (Manchu: ᡥᠣᡧᠣᡳ
ᡩᠣᡵᠣᠩᡤᠣ
ᠴᡳᠨ ᠸᠠᠩ; hošoi doronggo cin wang), or simply Prince Li, was the title of a princely peerage of the Manchu-led Qing dynasty of China. It was also one of the 12 "iron-cap" princely peerages in the Qing dynasty, which meant that the title could be passed down without being downgraded.

The first bearer of the title was Daišan (1583–1648), the second son of Nurhaci, the founder of the Later Jin dynasty. He was awarded the title in 1636 by his half-brother, Hong Taiji, who succeeded their father to the Later Jin throne and who later founded the Qing dynasty. The peerage was renamed to Prince Xun of the First Rank (Prince Xun) in 1651 during the reign of the Shunzhi Emperor, and to Prince Kang of the First Rank (Prince Kang) in 1659, before it was renamed back to Prince Li of the First Rank in 1778. The peerage was passed down over 12 generations and held by 15 persons. Of the 15 princes, two held the title as Prince Xun, four held the title as Prince Kang, while the remaining nine held the title as Prince Li.

== Members of the Prince Li / Prince Xun / Prince Kang peerage ==
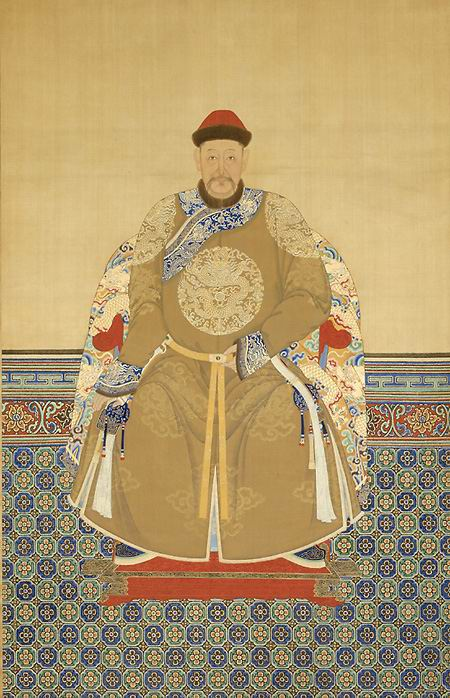
Daišan (1583–1648), the first Prince Li

Members of the Prince Li / Prince Xun / Prince Kang peerage
- Daišan (1583 – 1648; 1st), Nurhaci's second son, held the title Prince Li of the First Rank from 1636 to 1648, posthumously honoured as Prince Li Lie of the First Rank (禮烈親王)
  - 1st son: Yoto (1599–1639), Prince Cheng of the First Rank
    - Members of Prince Keqin peerage
  - 2nd son: Šoto (碩託; d. 1643), held the title of a beile from 1626. He was acting the title of a beizi from 1634 to 1639. He was demoted to the title of bulwark duke from 1639 to 1640. He was demoted to a commoner in 1643 due to seeking legislation for Dorgon with Adali, Prince Ying of the First Rank.
    - 3 sons: Laka (喇喀), Kilanbu (齊蘭布) & Yosaibu (岳賽布)
  - 3rd son: Sahalin (1604–1636), Prince Ying of the First Rank
    - Members of Prince Ying peerage & Prince Shuncheng peerage
  - 4th son: Wakeda (1606–1652), Prince Qian of the Second Rank
    - Members of Prince Qian peerage
  - 5th son: Balama (巴喇瑪)
  - 6th son: Mazhan (瑪佔; 1612–1638), held the title of a bulwark duke from 1636 to 1638. He had not male heir.
  - 7th son: Mandahai (滿達海; 1622–1652; 2nd), he held the title of a bulwark duke from 1641 to 1644. Then, he was promoted to the title of a beizi from 1644 to 1649. He succeeded the title Prince Li of the First Rank from 1649 to 1652, posthumously honoured as Prince Xun Jian of the First Rank (巽簡親王). His posthumous name changed to a title of a beile.
    - 1 Chang'adai (常阿岱; 21 Nov 1643 - 29 May 1665; 3rd), he succeeded the title Prince Xun of the First Rank from 1652 to 1659. He later held the title of a beile from 1659 to 1665 due to his father's posthumously demotion. He was posthumously honoured as Prince Xun Huaimin of the First Rank (巽懷愍親王). He was succeeded by his 6th son, Xingni as a beizi.
      - 1st son: Suojing (索晉)
      - 2nd son: Xilengtu (錫楞圖), held the title of a grace general.
      - 3rd son: Shixian (世憲), held the title of a grace general.
      - 4th son: Guangchang (廣昌), held the title of a grace general.
      - 5th son: Xichang (希常), a former grace general.
      - 6th son: Xingni, a former beizi & grace bulwark duke. He succeeded his father as a beizi.
    - 2nd son: Lengsaiyi (楞塞宜)
  - 8th son: Hūse (祜塞; 1628–1646), held the title of a grace defender duke from 1645 to 1646, posthumously honoured as Prince Kang Huishun of the First Rank (康惠順親王) in 1653 after Giyesu held the title of "Prince Kang of the Second Rank". His 2nd son, Jinggi succeeded him as a grace defender duke.
    - 1st son: Alin (阿林)
    - 2nd son: Jinggi (精濟; 14 Jan 1645 - 22 June 1649), he succeeded his father as a grace defender duke from 1646 and promoted as a second-rank prince under the title of Prince Kang of the Second Rank. He was posthumously honoured as Prince Kang Huaimin of the Second Rank (康懷愍郡王).
    - 3rd son: Giyesu (20 Jan 1645 – 1 Apr 1697; 4th), he initially succeeded his brother, Jinggi, under the title Prince Kang of the Second Rank from 1649 to 1659. He succeeded the peerage of Prince Li from 1659 to 1697 under the title of Prince Kang of the First Rank, posthumously honoured as Prince Kang Liang of the First Rank (康良親王).
      - 1st son Nitaha (尼塔哈), a former third class bulwark general.
      - 2nd son: Yantai (燕泰)
      - 3rd son: Zha'ertu (扎爾圖), held the title of a third class bulwark general.
      - 4th son: Ba'ertu (巴爾圖; died 1753; 7th), initially held the title of a third class bulwark general in 1693. He succeeded the title Prince Kang of the First Rank from 1734 to 1753, posthumously honoured as Prince Kang Jian of the First Rank (康簡親王)
        - 1st son: Mozhang (謨章), held the title of a supporter general.
        - 2nd son: Mocun (謨存), a sixth-rank officer.
        - 3rd son: Mocheng (謨成)
        - 4th son: Moben (謨本), held the title of a supporter general.
        - 5th, 6th & 7th son: Mohong (謨宏), Mowen (謨文) & Mosheng (謨聲)
        - 8th son: Moyun (謨雲), held the title of a third class defender general.
        - 9th, 10th, 11th & 12th son: Moshou (謨壽), Moyu (謨裕), Moyao (謨耀) & Motai (謨泰)
        - 13th son: Mogong (謨恭), held the title of a second class supporter general.
        - 14th son: Mojing (謨經), held the title of a third class supporter general.
        - 15th son: Modian (謨典), a former second class bulwark general.
        - 16th son: Morui (謨瑞)
        - 17th son: Moguang (謨廣), held the title of a first class bulwark general.
        - 18th & 19th son: Moshun (謨順) & Mojian (謨建)
        - 20th son: Moxian (謨顯), held the title of a second class bulwark general.
        - 21st & 22nd son: Moxun (謨勳) & Moling (謨靈)
        - 23rd son: Moliang (謨亮), held the title of a third class defender general.
        - 24th son: Mohao (謨浩)
      - 5th son: Chuntai (椿泰; 5 Sep 1683 - 20 Jun 1709; 5th), succeeded the title Prince Kang of the First Rank from 1697 to 1709, posthumously honoured as Prince Kang Dao of the First Rank (康悼親王)
        - Chong'an (崇安; died 1733; 6th), succeeded the title Prince Kang of the First Rank from 1709 to 1733, posthumously honoured as Prince Kangxiu of the First Rank (康修親王)
          - 1st son: Kuifu (魁福)
          - 2nd son: Yong'en (永恩; 12 Sep 1727 - 10 Apr 1805; 8th), He held the title of a beile from 1734 to 1753, when his uncle, Ba'ertu succeeded the title of Prince Kang of the First Rank. He succeeded the peerage under the title Prince Li of the First Rank from 1753 to 1805, posthumously honoured as Prince Li Gong of the First Rank (禮恭親王)
            - Zhaolian (昭槤; 26 Mar 1776 – 14 Jan 1833; 9th), succeeded the title Prince Li of the First Rank from 1805 to 1816, his title stripped in 1816 and house arrested for 3 years.
              - Xirui (錫濬)
          - 3rd son: Yonghui (永㥣; 5 Feb 1729 – 28 Mar 1799;), held the title of a defender general from 1749, posthumously honoured as Prince Li of the First Rank in 1817 after his son succeeded the peerage.
            - 1st son: Linzhi (麟趾; 1756–1821 10th), Yonghui's son, succeeded the title Prince Li of the First Rank from 1817 to 1821, posthumously honoured as Prince Li'an of the First Rank (禮安親王)
              - Xichun (錫春; 1776 – 1817), posthumously honoured as Prince Li of the First Rank after his son, Quanling succeeded the peerage.
                - 1st son: Quanling (全齡; 15 Dec 1816 – 9 May 1850; 11th), He held the title of a grace general from 1820. He succeeded the title Prince Li of the First Rank from 1821 to 1850. He served as banner leader of Bordered Red in 1839. He was posthumously honoured as 'Prince Li He of the First Rank (禮和親王)
                  - 1st & 2nd son: Yukun (裕昆) & Shize (世澤)
                  - 3rd son: Shiduo (世鐸; 27 Jul 1843 – 8 Jan 1914; 12th), succeeded the title Prince Li of the First Rank from 1850 to 1914, posthumously honoured as Prince Li Ke of the First Rank (禮恪親王)
                    - Chenghou (誠厚; 1864 – 1917; 13th), succeeded the title Prince Li of the First Rank from 1914 to 1917, posthumously honoured as Prince Li Dun of the First Rank (禮敦親王)
                  - 4th son: Shihua (世華)
                - 2nd son: Quanchang (全昌; 1818 – 1871), a third class imperial bodyguards.
                  - Yuding (裕定; 1838 – 1891)
                    - Chengkun (誠堃; 1886 – 1929; 14th), adopted as Shiduo's son, succeeded the title Prince Li of the First Rank from 1917 to 1929.
                      - Junming (濬銘; 1918–1951; 15th), Chenghou's adoptive son, succeeded the title Prince Li of the First Rank from 1929 to 1945.
                - 3rd son: Quancheng (全成)
            - 2nd, 3rd & 4th son Maoxun (茂恂), Maoji (茂績) & Maozheng (茂政)

== Family tree ==
Family of Prince Li (禮)

Daišan 代善 (1583–1648); Prince Lilie 禮烈親王 (1636–1648)
Mandahai 滿達海/满达海 (1622–1652); Prince Xunjian 巽簡親王/巽简亲王 (1649–1652) | Hūse 祜塞 (died 1646)
Chang'adai 常阿岱 (died 1665); Prince Xunhuaimin 巽懷愍親王 (1659–1665) | Giyesu 傑書/杰书 (1645–1697); Prince Kangliang 康良親王 (1659–1697)
Ba'ertu 巴爾圖/巴尔图 (died 1753); Prince Kangjian 康簡親王 (1734–1753) | Chuntai 椿泰 (died 1709); Prince Kangdao 康悼親王 (1697–1709)
Chong'an 崇安 (died 1733); Prince Kangxiu 康修親王 (1709–1733)
Yong'en 永恩 (died 1805); Prince Ligong 禮恭親王 (1753–1805) | Yonghui 永㥣 (1729–1799); Prince Li 禮親王 (posthumously awarded)
Zhaolian 昭槤 (1776–1833); Prince Li 禮親王 (1805–1816) (stripped of his title) | Linzhi 麟趾 (1756–1821); Prince Li'an 禮安親王 (1817–1821)
Xichun 錫春/锡春 (1776–1817); Prince Li 禮親王 (posthumously awarded)
Quanling 全齡/全龄 (1816–1850); Prince Lihe 禮和親王 (1821–1850) | Quanchang 全昌 (1818–1871)
Shiduo 世鐸/世铎 (1843–1914); Prince Like 禮恪親王 (1850–1914) | Yuding 裕定 (1838–1891)
Chenghou 誠厚/诚厚 (1864–1917); Prince Lidun 禮敦親王 (1914–1917) | Chengkun 誠堃/诚堃 (1886–1929); Prince Li 禮親王 (1917–1929)
Junming 濬銘/浚铭 (1918–1951); Prince Li 禮親王 (1929–1945)

Legend:

| adoption |

== See also ==
- Prince Qian
- Royal and noble ranks of the Qing dynasty
