= Li Yongfang =

Li Yongfang (Chinese: 李永芳; died 1634) was a Chinese general of the Ming dynasty and Qing dynasty known for defecting to the Qing dynasty, due to the Ming dynasty losing the city of Fushun in Liaoning to the Qing. Li Yongfang along with many other Han Chinese defected to the Qing as the old Ming system was declining and corrupt, and the Qing provided an opportunity for the Han Chinese to continue their culture. One of Li Yongfang's descendants Li Shiyao was sentenced to death by the Qianlong emperor but was spared his life when he helped suppress the Lin Shuangwen rebellion in Taiwan.

== Battle of Fushun ==
The Battle of Fushun would be the first military conflict between the Later Jin, predecessor of Qing, and the Ming dynasty. Li Yongfang only had 1,200 men under his command. The Jin army assailed the city walls with siege ladders and the unprepared garrison gave their lives in a hasty defense. Li and his lieutenant, Zhao Yipeng, decided to surrender on the condition that no one was to be harmed. Nurhaci agreed to the terms and entered the city.

Li along with many other Han Chinese of the Ming defected to the Qing dynasty and Manchus because the old Ming system and Zhu emperors was corrupt and the new Qing dynasty gave the opportunity to the Han Chinese to continue their culture. Many Chinese saw the opportunity of serving a Manchu ruler without abandoning their Han Chinese cultural and political experience. He along with a number of Han Chinese surrendered or were captured and entered Manchu service in an administration that adapted many Han Chinese methods. Nurhaci's granddaughter by his son Abatai married Li as a result of his defection to the Qing. The offspring of Li received the "Third Class Viscount" (三等子爵; sān děng zǐjué) title.

== Qing dynasty ==
Li Yongfang later fought as a lieutenant-general at the side of Nurhaci and participated in the Later Jin invasion of Joseon. Although spared and given privileged status as one of the first to defect, Li lost Nurhaci's confidence in 1622 when he opposed the khan's desire to massacre any Chinese refugees who sought to escape his rule. Despite this, Li remained ambivalent towards Ming overtures trying to re-enlist him in their army. Li Yongfang died in 1634 with the rank of viscount. All nine of his sons continued to provide service to the imperial throne.

Li is the father of Li Shuaitai and the great-great-great-grandfather of Li Shiyao (李侍堯). During the Qianlong Emperor's reign, Li Shiyao was involved in graft and embezzlement, demoted of his title and sentenced to death. However, his life was spared after assisting in suppressing the Lin Shuangwen rebellion in the Taiwan.
