= Tu Honggang =

Chinese singer and actor (born 1967)

- 屠洪刚
- Born: March 15, 1967 (age 59); Qiqihar, China
- Education: National Academy of Chinese Theatre Arts
- Occupations: Actor, singer
- Years active: 1987–present
- Political party: China Democratic League
- Spouses: Daisy (m. 1989–1992) Fang Shu (m. 1994–2002): Xiao Yue
- Children: 2 (plus 1 stepson)
- Musical career
- Genre: Mandopop

Chinese name
- Traditional Chinese: 屠洪剛
- Simplified Chinese: 屠洪刚
Transcriptions
Standard Mandarin
- Hanyu Pinyin: Tú Hónggāng

Tu Honggang (Chinese: 屠洪刚; born March 15, 1967) is a Chinese singer and actor. He is best known for his singles The Patriots, Chinese Kung Fu, You, and Peacock Flying Southeast.

Apart from music, Tu commenced an acting career, appearing in Records of Kangxi's Travel Incognito (1997), Taizu Mishi (2015), Lady of the Dynasty (2015), and Let's Get Married (2015).

He is a member of the China Democratic League (Minmeng).

== Early life and education ==
Tu was born in Beijing, China, on March 15, 1967. At the age of 11, he entered the National Academy of Chinese Theatre Arts, majoring in acting. In 1987, as pop music from Hong Kong and Taiwan was becoming popular in mainland China, Tu and his classmate often sung and studied songs with a recorder, he became a member of "Light Music", in his college years, he was a widely known campus singer.

== Acting career ==
Tu had his first experience in front of the camera in 1991, and he was chosen to act as a support actor in Let Us Sway Twin Oars. He landed some small appearances in several TV series, such as Crazy Rolling Stones (1991), Temporary Families (1994), Sunny Beauty (2003), Memories of The Golden Flame (2008).

In 1997, he had a supporting role and sang the theme song in Records of Kangxi's Travel Incognito, a historical television series starring Zhang Guoli and Deng Jie.

In 2005, he appeared as Taksi in You Xiaogang's Taizu Mishi, which starred Steve Ma, Vivian Chen, Wu Qianqian, and Jin Qiaoqiao, and sang the theme song for the series.

In 2015, he participated in two films. He had a minor role as Chen Xuanli in Lady of the Dynasty, which starred Fan Bingbing, Leon Lai, Wu Chun and Joan Chen. He had a cameo appearance in Let's Get Married, a romantic comedy film starring Gao Yuanyuan, Jiang Wu, Li Chen, Zheng Kai, Ivy Chen, Bea Hayden, and Liu Tao.

== Music career ==
In July 1985, Tu was assigned to China Railway Art Troupe as a solo. In November 1987, he was transferred to China Broadcasting Art Troupe. At the same year, he released his debut solo album Black Eyes.

His 2nd album, titled Lack for Nothing, was released on January 12, 1989.

In 1990, he sang a song in the CCTV New Year's Gala.

His 3rd album, titled Feeling, was released on November 7, 1991. Then he withdrew from the song circles.

From 1994 to 1996, he released his singles The Patriots, Chinese Kung Fu, You, and Peacock Flying Southeast.

On April 23, 2005, he released his 10th album Wind and Cloud 2.

In 2008, he performed on the MV of Welcome to Beijing for the 2008 Beijing Olympic Games.

On October 21, 2011, he went on a world tour in Beijing with a sold-out show. On November 20, 2012, his second station of the world tour was held in Taiyuan, Shanxi. On January 19, 2013, the world tour was held in Tiexi Gymnasium, Shenyang, Liaoning.

On New Year's Eve of Beijing Television in 2016, he performed his single Flying.

== Personal life ==
Tu has married three times. In early 1989, he married his first wife Daisy, a 19-year-old American girl in the United States, and they had a son, Tu Ruibao (屠芮葆). The couple divorced in 1992.

He married his second wife actress Fang Shu in October 1994. They had a child together, before they divorced June 5, 2002.

His third wife is Xiao Yue, and he has a stepson, Azan Honggang (阿赞洪刚).

== Filmography ==
=== Film ===
Year	English title	Chinese title	Role	Notes
2015	Lady of the Dynasty	王朝的女人·杨贵妃	Chen Xuanli	
2015	Let's Get Married	咱们结婚吧	Captain	

=== TV series ===
Year	English title	Chinese title	Role	Notes
1991	Let Us Sway Twin Oars	让我们荡起双桨	Qian Shaolin	
1991	Crazy Rolling Stones	疯狂的滚石		
1994	Temporary Families	临时家庭		
1997	Records of Kangxi's Travel Incognito	康熙微服私访记	Zong Gongdao	
2003	Sunny Beauty	阳光丽人		
2004	Flowery March	烟花三月	Wu Sangui	
2005	Taizu Mishi	太祖秘史	Taksi	
2008		晋阳老醋坊	Kangxi Emperor	
2008	Memories of The Golden Flame	烽火影人	Director Zhao	
2016	Brother of War	战火中的兄弟	Peng Dallei	
2017	The Battle At Dawn	黎明决战	Chu Pengfei	

== Discography ==
=== Studio album ===
#	English title	Chinese title	Released	Label	Notes
1st	Black Eyes	黑色的眼眸	1987		
2nd	Lack for Nothing	应有尽有	January 12, 1989	Shanghai Audio-Visual Company	
3rd	Feeling	感觉自己	November 7, 1991	China International Cultural Communication Audio-Visual Publishing House	
4th	Farewell My Concubine	霸王别姬	1996		
5th	Chinese Kung Fu	中国功夫	January 1, 1997	White Swan Audio-Visual Company	
6th	The Patriots	精忠报国	September 23, 1999	Rock Records	
7th	Lose	放手	2001	Meika Audio-Visual Company	
8th	A Beautiful Sunset of Life	九九艳阳天	2002		
9th	My Love	我爱	February 23, 2004	Chinese Musicians	
10th	Wind and Cloud 2	风云2	April 23, 2005	Star	
11th	Thanking	感谢	April 18, 2008	Fengchu Shengshi Cultural	
12th	One of Us	自己人	August 15, 2012		

=== Singles ===
English title	Chinese title	Notes
We Broke Up in the Morning	我们在清晨分手	Theme song for Codename Cougar
Woman Spy	千面女谍	Theme song for Dark Rose
Glory	光辉	Ending song for Life of Dragon and Tiger
The Patriots	精忠报国	Ending song for Death Duel
Partner	伴儿	Ending song for Partner
The Lover	爱人	Theme song for Partner
Ace of Aces	王中王	Theme song for Ace of Aces
Peacock Flying Southeast	孔雀东南方飞	Theme song for Peacock Flying southeast
Smeil	嫣然回眸	Ending song for The Legend of Xishi
Ye Wen Shuang Tian	叶问霜天	Theme song for Ip Man
Wind and Cloud	风云	Theme song for Wind and Cloud
Only Brother	唯有兄弟	Ending song for Father's War
My Heart	我的心	Theme song for Wudang
A Hero of Troubled Times	乱世英雄	Theme song for Legend of Lyu Buwei
	做人做事	Theme song for Legend of Hai Rui
	独占潇洒	Ending song for Fengshenbang
Seeking	寻求	Interlude for Fengshenbang
Swords May Not Be Ruthless	刀剑未必无情	Interlude for Fengshenbang
	我心为谁动	Theme song for Fist of Fury
Crouching Tiger and Hidden Dragon	卧虎藏龙	Theme song for Water Margin
Jiangshan Wuxian	江山无限	Theme song for Records of Kangxi's Travel Incognito
Savanna	莽原	Theme song for Taizu Mishi
You	你	Theme song for Xiao Zhang Epic
If You're Doomed	在劫难逃	Theme song for The Legend of the Banner Hero
