= Records of Kangxi's Travel Incognito =

- Traditional Chinese: 康熙微服私訪記
- Simplified Chinese: 康熙微服私访记
- Hanyu Pinyin: Kāngxī Weīfú Sīfǎng Jì
- Genre: Historical
- Written by: Zou Jingzhi
- Directed by: Zhang Guoli
- Starring: Zhang Guoli; Deng Jie; Zhao Liang; Liu Miao; Hou Kun
- Opening theme: Tu Honggang Vast Territory of the Motherland (《万里江山》)
- Ending theme: Dai Rao People is the God (《百姓才是头上天》)
- Country of origin: China
- Original language: Mandarin
- No. of seasons: 5
- No. of episodes: 144

Production
- Executive producer: Deng Jie
- Production location: Hengdian World Studios
- Production company: Guangdong Star Studios

Original release
- Release: 1998 – 2007

Records of Kangxi's Travel Incognito is a Chinese television series revolves around the Manchu-ruling Qing Empire monarch Kangxi Emperor (Zhang Guoli) and the corruption he faces as he tries to make the government run efficiently. The series was directed by Zhang Guoli and produced by Deng Jie. The series consists of a total of 144 episodes shot in high definition, each 45 minutes long. The series is based on the events in the Kangxi era of the reign of Kangxi Emperor during the Qing Dynasty. The series also features Kangxi Emperor's family member and entourage in prominent roles and storylines, most notably his Concubine Yi (Deng Jie) and eunuch Sandezi (Zhao Liang) and Buddhist monk Fayin (Hou Kun), and Concubine Yi's servant girl Xiao Taohong (Liu Miao). The program originally aired from 1998 to 2007, spanning five seasons and 144 episodes. For the first four seasons, the show starred Zhang Guoli and Deng Jie as Kangxi Emperor and Concubine Yi respectively. In the last season, John Lone and Irene Wan became the stars.

== Cast ==
- Zhang Guoli as Kangxi Emperor.
- Deng Jie as Concubine Yi.
- Zhao Liang as Sandezi.
- Liu Miao as Xiao Taohong.
- Hou Kun as Monk Fayin.

== Others ==
=== Season 1 ===
- Tao Hong as Luo Jinhong.
- Liu Long as Songgotu.
- Li Ruping as Hong Yuandao.
- Cai Hongxiang as Luo Shixiang.
- Xu Yizhao as Ferdinand Verbiest.
- Cong Peixin as Private assistant He.
- Li Jiang as Suo'anren.
- Gao Hu as Prince.
- Chen Chuang as Wen Huazi.
- Wang Xiaowei as Wu Huazi.
- Gao Ao as The beggar.
- Chen Xing as The warder.
- Lin Moyu as Empress Dowager Xiaozhuang.
- Jiang Qinqin as Zhu Wenqiao.
- Yang Ruoxi as Zhui'er.
- Xia Yu as Wo Laiye.
- Feng Yuanzheng as Tan Yide.
- Guan Zongxiang as Zhu Guozhi.
- Liu Yajin as Ha Liutong.
- Huang Suying as Mother Tan.
- Tu Honggang as Zong Gongdao.
- Hong Zongyi as The warder.
- Zhao Liangjun as Uncle Liu.
- Liu Meijuan as Ma Saisai.
- Liu Jiang as Mingzhu.
- Li Ding as Nalan Xingde, the son of Mingzhu.
- Li Po as Xu Yuanwen.
- Wang Weiming as Lian Suo.
- Li Zhanwen as Li Mu'an.
- Liu Wei as Zhang Mingyuan.
- Dai Rao as Bande Caiyun.
- Li Geng as Song Da'an.
- He Mingsheng as Ban Dehai.

=== Season 2 ===
- Zhu Yuanyuan as Lu Zhu.
- Feng Lei as Lu Hong.
- Li Jianyi as Lu Chuan.
- Xia Lixin as He Yun.
- Zhuang Qingning as Concubine Jin.
- Xu Lu as Fang Xiaoya.
- Li Geng as Guo Tong.
- Chen Chuang as Guo Qian.
- Yang Dong as Lian'er.
- Zhao Wei as Yue Qing'er.
- Xue Zhongrui as Yue Sanfeng.
- Yang Junyong as Ping Sihai.
- Shen Chang as Sister Feng.

=== Season 3 ===
- Gong Beibi as Li Wanqiu.
- Yang Junyong as Fu Sanshan.
- Zhong Weihua as Tao Erde.
- Wang Jingming as Long Keduo.
- Chen Chuang as Shunxi.
- Wu Xiaodong as Gali.
- Zhang Yongqi as Chuhuan.
- Zhang Shaohua as Mother Feng.
- Chen Youwang as Chu Wuji.
- Li Ruoxi as Tie Ling'er.
- Li Geng as Yuan Tian'gao.
- Gao Hu as Yunreng.
- Huang Suying as Mother Ma.

=== Season 4 ===
- Lin Qing as Nie Yuexiu,
- Du Yuming as Ma Litu.
- Ma Zijun as Su Keqi.
- Hua Zi as Xiu Liu.
- Chen Chuang as Lian Sheng.
- Wang Jingming as The old beggar.
- Yang Yu'na as Sa Lian'er.
- Lin Jing as Concubine Ding.
- Tu Ling as Liu Hong.

=== Season 5 ===
- John Lone as Kangxi Emperor.
- Irene Wan as Concubine Yi.
- Ma Dongdong as Xiao Taohong.
- Liang Tian as Sandezi.
- Wu Song as Monk Fayin.
- Jade Leung as Ru Nan.
- Helen Yao as Qian Xiangya.
- Hong Zongyi as Li Qi.
- Liang Xing as Xiaoya.
- Ji Chenmu as Wan Jianxiong.
- Yao Lu as Mo Duo.
- Huang Xinjing as Murong Chun.
- Anatoly Shanin as Ferdinand Verbiest.
