= Lady Hešeri =

Women of the Manchu Hešeri clan referred to as Lady Hešeri include:

- Empress Xiaochengren (1654 – 1674), of the Manchu Plain Yellow Banner, a consort of the Kangxi Emperor.
- Imperial Noble Consort Xianzhe (1856 – 1932), of the Manchu Bordered Blue Banner, a consort of the Tongzhi Emperor

== See also ==
- Hešeri
