= Huang Taizi Mishi =

- Promotional poster
- 皇太子秘史
- Genre: Historical drama
- Written by: Yang Haiwei
- Directed by: You Xiaogang
- Presented by: You Xiaogang
- Starring: Steve Ma; Liu Dekai; Dai Jiaoqian; Ning Jing; Hu Jing; Wu Qianqian; Zhao Hongfei; Shu Chang
- Opening theme: "Already Knew" (其实早知道) by Dave Wong and Dai Jiaoqian
- Country of origin: China
- Original language: Mandarin
- No. of episodes: 32

Production
- Executive producer: Yang Qun
- Production location: China
- Running time: ≈45 minutes per episode

Original release
- Network: CTV

Related
- Xiaozhuang Mishi; Taizu Mishi; Secret History of Kangxi

Huang Taizi Mishi (皇太子秘史; Secret History of the Crown Prince) is a 2004 Chinese historical television series produced by You Xiaogang. The series is the second instalment in a series of four television series set in the early Qing dynasty. It was preceded by Xiaozhuang Mishi (2003), and followed by Taizu Mishi (2005) and Secret History of Kangxi (2006), all of which were also produced by You Xiaogang. The series follows the life of Yinreng, a son of the Kangxi Emperor who was crown prince for two terms during his father's reign before he eventually lost the succession to his brother Yinzhen.

== Synopsis ==
The series romanticises the life of Yinreng, a son of the Kangxi Emperor of the Qing dynasty. Yinreng was designated crown prince for two terms during his father's reign before he was eventually deposed. His younger brother, Yinzhen, ultimately takes the throne as the Yongzheng Emperor.

== Cast ==
- Steve Ma as Yinreng
- Liu Dekai as the Kangxi Emperor
- Dai Jiaoqian as Ruyu
- Ning Jing as Princess Jianning
- Hu Jing as Ziying
- Wu Qianqian as Consort De
- Zhao Hongfei as Yinzhen
- Shu Chang as Princess Yun
- Lü Zhong as Empress Dowager Xiaozhuang
- Bai Qinglin as Shulun
- Huang Leixin as Yinsi
- Chen Zhihui as Yinti
- Gao Ming as Wang Zhiming
- Zheng Tianyong as Songgotu
- Xu Min as Mingju
- Cai Wen as Consort Hui
- Zheng Shuang as Princess Changping
  - Qiao Qiao as Princess Changping (younger)
- Shi Xiaoqun as Lady Niohuru
- Zong Fengyan as Longkodo
- Zhang Jianxiang as Heshen
- Zhou Jia as Empress Hešeri
- Wan Ni'en as Lady Gorolo
