= Empress Renxiao =

Empress Renxiao may refer to:

- Empress Xu (Ming dynasty) (1362–1407), wife of the Yongle Emperor
- Empress Xiaochengren (1654–1674), wife of the Kangxi Emperor
