= Secret History of Kangxi =

2006 Chinese TV series

- DVD cover art
- Also known as: Nalan and Kangxi
- 康熙秘史 / 纳兰与康熙
- Genre: Historical drama
- Written by: Li Xiaoming; Ke Zhanghe; Mo Ran
- Directed by: You Xiaogang
- Presented by: Wang Zhenghua; Wang Guangqun; Zhou Shaocheng; Chen Mengjuan
- Starring: Xia Yu; Hu Jing; Wallace Chung; Wu Qianqian; Chae Rim
- Opening theme: "Ten Thousand Hurrahs" (一万次呼喊) by Wallace Chung and Shi Xiaoqun
- Country of origin: China
- Original language: Mandarin
- No. of episodes: 42

Production
- Producers: Yang Qun; He Jichang
- Production location: China
- Running time: ≈45 minutes per episode
- Production company: Beijing Jingdu Century Cultural Development

Original release
- Network: ATV
- Release: 25 December 2006 – 17 February 2007

Related
- Xiaozhuang Mishi; Huang Taizi Mishi; Taizu Mishi

Secret History of Kangxi (康熙秘史), also known as Nalan and Kangxi (纳兰与康熙) in its Hong Kong release on ATV, is a 2006 Chinese historical television series produced by You Xiaogang. Romanticising the life of the Kangxi Emperor, the series is the fourth instalment in a series of four television series set in the early Qing dynasty. It was preceded by Xiaozhuang Mishi (2003), Huang Taizi Mishi (2004) and Taizu Mishi (2005), all of which were also produced by You Xiaogang.

== Cast ==
- Xia Yu as the Kangxi Emperor
- Hu Jing as Qingge'er
- Wallace Chung as Nalan Xingde
- Wu Qianqian as Empress Dowager Xiaozhuang
- Du Yulu as Oboi
- Chae Rim as Empress Hešeri
- Shi Xiaoqun as Consort Hui
- Shi An as Cao Yin
- Li Fei'er as Princess Duanmin
- William Lee as Fuquan
- Bo Guanjun as Mingju
- Wang Xufeng as Suksaha
- Yu Weifeng as Songgotu
- Di Jianqing as Prince An
- Liu Can as Banbu Ershan
- Li Guohua as Ebilun
- Lei Mu as Mulima
- Zhuang Jin as Sumalagu
- Hu Zhonghu as Liang Jiugong
- Sun Xiuchen as Nanny Ning
- Cai Wenyan as Lady Gui
- Zhao Lianjun as Giyesu
- Bai Qinglin as Lu Rui
- Lu Enhua as Xiao Wan
- Ren Yuqing as Shang Zhixin
- Dong Ziwu as Wu Sangui
- Zhu Xiaochun as Imperial Physician Wang
