= Prince Li =

Prince Li may refer to any of the following princely peerages of the Qing dynasty in China:

- Prince Li (禮), created in 1636
- Prince Li (理), created in 1724
