= Dai Jiaoqian =

- 戴娇倩
- Born: June 4, 1982 (age 44); Shanghai, China
- Other name: Shirley Dai
- Education: East China Normal University
- Occupations: Actress, singer, hostess
- Years active: 1998-present
- Agent: Dinglongda Media Company

Chinese name
- Traditional Chinese: 戴嬌倩
- Simplified Chinese: 戴娇倩
Transcriptions
Standard Mandarin
- Hanyu Pinyin: Daì Jiāoqiàn
- Musical career
- Genre: Mandopop

Dai Jiaoqian (Chinese: 戴娇倩; born 4 June 1982), also known as Shirley Dai, is a Chinese actress, singer and hostess.

Dai is noted for her roles as Liu Xia and Princess Xingdai in the television series Flowering Season, Rainy Season (1998) and The Palace: the Lost Daughter (2014) respectively.

== Life ==
=== Early life ===
Dai was born in Shanghai on June 4, 1982, where she attended the Shanghai No.3 Middle School for Girls and Shanghai Caoyang NO.2 High School, with her ancestral home in Nanjing, Jiangsu. Dai graduated as a recommended student, majoring in Chinese language.

=== Acting career ===
Dai first rose to prominence in 1998 for playing Liu Xia in the television series Flowering Season, Rainy Season, for which she received nominations at the 17th Golden Eagle Awards.

Dai's first film role was a clerk uncredited appearance in the film Crash Landing (2000).

In 2002, Dai had a supporting role in Contact, which won Best Supporting Actress at the 12th Chunyan Awards.

In 2004, Dai played her role as Ru Yu in the Xiaozhuang Epic sequel, Secret History of the Crown Prince.

In 2005, Dai participated in Jeffrey Lau's A Chinese Tall Story, a fantasy adventure film starring Nicholas Tse, Charlene Choi, Fan Bingbing, Bolin Chen and Steven Cheung.

She starred in many television series, such as Phoenix Swing (2001), Shouting for You to Come Back (2007), Spring Goes, Spring Comes (2008) and The Diamond Family (2009).

In 2007, Dai appeared as Jian Xiong in The Sword and the Chess of Death, a wuxia television series starring Tony Sun, Jenson Tien, Liu Tao and Ray Lui.

In 2010, Dai starred as Tong Jinyu, reuniting her with co-star Kingdom Yuen, who played Ma Linglong, in the television series Happy Mother-in-Law, Pretty Daughter-in-Law.

In 2011, Dai played the character Li Qinghe in The Legend of Crazy Monk 2, an ancient costume comedy starring Benny Chan, Lam Chi-chung, Zhang Liang and Ye Zuxin.

Dai played a supporting role Huo Caidie in the 2012 wuxia television series The Bride with White Hair, adapted from Liang Yusheng's novel of the same title. The same year, Dai starred in the romantic comedy television series Mermaid Legend, alongside Kenny Kwan, Zanilia Zhao and Ding Zijun, the series was one of the most watched ones in mainland China in that year. In 2013, China Whisper described her as "Top 10 Most Beautiful Girls in Shanghai".

In 2014, Dai starred with Lu Yi, Mabel Yuan, Gao Yunxiang and Yang Rong in The Palace: the Lost Daughter, the sequel to 2012's Palace II.

== Filmography ==
=== Film ===
Year	English title	Chinese title	Role	Notes
2000	Crash Landing	《紧急迫降》	guest	
2005	A Chinese Tall Story	《情癫大圣》	a devil	
2008	Hutong Days	《胡同里的阳光》	Xiao Hui	
2014		《爱情鸟》	Na Na	
2015	A Promise to the Kurichenko's	《相伴库里申科》		

=== Television series ===
Year	English title	Chinese title	Role	Notes
1998	Flowering Season, Rainy Season	《花季·雨季》	Liu Xia	
1998		《烟雨红尘》	Xiao Ya	
1999		《哎呦妈妈》	Xu Bing	
2000		《西区故事》	Qiu Feng	
2000		《谈婚论嫁》	Hong Ling	
2000	Chinese Hero	《中华大丈夫》	A Le	
2001	Phoenix Swing	《凤在江湖》	Feng Huang	
2001	Contact	《非常接触》	Ding Ning	
2001	Plan of Horse Whistle and West Wind	《策马啸西风》	Lin Huan'er	
2002		《都市东游记》	Tang Zhao	
2002		《烧饼皇后》	Huo Xiang	
2003		《怪才祝枝山》	Li Shougu	
2003	Eighteen Monks	《十八罗汉》	Li Qingqing	
2004	Secret History of the Crown Prince	《皇太子秘史》	Ru Yu	
2005		《茶马古道》	Yang Huayi	
2005	The World is at Peace	《天下太平》	Shang Tianbei	
2005		《情断上海滩》	Qiao Yiyi	
2005		《梧桐相思雨》	Jin Yuxuan	
2007	Man's True Color	《男人本色》	Tan Xiaoqin	
2007		《谁为梦想买单》	Jin Liu	
2007	The Romantic King of Dramas	《风流戏王》	Princess Long	
2007		《天下农民》	Tianzao	
2007	Shouting for You to Come Back	《大声呼喊你回来》	Luo Qian	
2007		《走天山的女人》	Meng Shan	
2007	The Sword and the Chess of Death	《魔剑生死棋》	Jian Xiong	
2007	Small Town Past Events	《小城往事》	Xiu Wen	
2008	Coming Face to Face	《狭路相逢》	Gao Xiaoyan	
2008	Hostile Camp 18 Years	《敌营十八年》	Teng Yulian	
2008	Spring Goes, Spring Comes	《春去春又回》	Shen Zijun	
2009		《落泪成金》	Chengcheng	
2009	Say Love in Music	《我用音乐说爱你》	Dai Lin	
2009	The Diamond Family	《钻石豪门》	Yu Aixue/ Yao Keren	
2009	Battlefield Romance Tune	《战地浪漫曲》	Yingzi	
2010	Happy Mother-in-Law, Pretty Daughter-in-Law	《欢喜婆婆俏媳妇》	Tong Jinyu	
2011	3S Lady	《单身女王》	Gu Feifei	
2011	Best Quality Mother	《极品妈妈》	An Ke	
2011	The Legend of Crazy Monk 2	《活佛济公2》	Li Qinghe	
2011	Perfect Husband	《完美丈夫》	Zhou Meimei	
2011	Love in the War Time	《烽火儿女情》	Su Yuhan/ Xu Yaqin	
2012	The Last Shot	《最后一枪》	Shen Xueqing	
2012	Mermaid Legend	《追鱼传奇》	Jin Mudan	
2012	Name Bride	《错婚》	Qin Yue	
2012	The Bride with White Hair	《新白发魔女传》	Huo Caidie	
2012	My War	《我的抗战》	Lin Ruoping	
2013		《名门媳妇》	Ye Zichun	
2013		《怒海情仇》	Tang Ruyin	
2013	Happy Wife Growing Up	《幸福媳妇成长记》	Xu Qianqian	
2014	Changsha Battle	《长沙保卫战》	Fang Shaoyun	
2014	Strait	《海峡》	Liu Xiaofeng	
2014	Sky Net 2012	《天网2012》	Su Ling	
2014	Family Banquet	《家宴》	Feng Guoguo	
2014	The Palace: The Lost Daughter	《宫锁连城》	Xing Dai	
2014		《一诺千金》	Si Xiaoya	
2014		《烽火青春》	Xia Lan/ An Lei	
2014	Country Founder: Zhu De	《开国元勋朱德》	Kang Keqing	
2014		《如果爱可以重来》	Tian Xin	
2026	Where the Mask Ends	Ren Yuzhen		

=== Single ===
- Over the Heart (Chinese: 把心交出来)
- I Know (Chinese: 其实早知道)
- Call (Chinese: 呼唤)
- My Motherland, I Love You (Chinese: 我的中国我爱你)
- The Sound a Flower Blooms (Chinese: 花开的声音)
- Shouting for You to Come Back (Chinese: 大声呼喊你回来)
- A Little Happy Woman (Chinese: 幸福小女人)
- Love of The Starry Sky (Chinese: 爱的星空)
- Figure (Chinese: 身影)
- Suddenly Remind of You (Chinese: 忽然想起)

=== Television Programme ===
- Travel Channel Inc. - Top Model
- CCTV-4 - Cyber Sunday
- Hebei Television - Wonderful Television
- Tianjin Television - The Legendary Swordsman
- China Education Television
- Dragon Television

== Awards ==
Year	Work	Award	Result	Notes
1999	Flowering Season, Rainy Season	17th Golden Eagle Award for Best Actress	Nominated	
2002	Contact	12th Chunyan Award for Best Supporting Actress	Won	
2012		Shanghai Media Group Limited - The Most Popular Actress	Won	
