= Gabula =

Gabula may refer to:

- Gabula (Syria), an ancient city, former bishopric and present Latin Catholic titular see
- Gabula (general) (died 1681), in China
- William Gabula, a Ugandan leader
