= Golden Eagle Award for Best Supporting Actress (China) =

Chinese TV award

Golden Eagle Award for Best Supporting Actress also known as Best Performance by an Actress in a Supporting Role(Chinese name:中国电视金鹰奖最佳女配角,1983–2000). Since 2001, the category was retired. Until 2022, this category will be awarded again.

== Winners and nominees ==
=== 2020s ===
Year	Number	Actress	Television Series
2024	32nd	Gao Ye 高叶	The Knockout 狂飙
2024	32nd	Wu Yue 吴越	Blossoms Shanghai 繁花
2024	32nd	Ding Liuyuan 丁柳元	The Power Source 麓山之歌
2024	32nd	Zhang Keying 张可盈	The Story of Xing Fu 幸福到万家
2024	32nd	Ada Liu 柳岩	A Dream of Splendor 梦华录
2024	32nd	Jiang Yan 姜妍	Always On The Move 南来北往
2022	31st	Ma Li 马丽	Beyond 超越
2022	31st	Sa Rina 萨日娜	A Lifelong Journey 人世间
2022	31st	Huang Xiaolei 黄小蕾	A Lifelong Journey 人世间
2022	31st	Jin Jing 金靖	Remembrance of Things Past 我在他乡挺好的
2022	31st	Song Chunli 宋春丽	People's Justice 巡回检查组
2022	31st	Yan Bingyan 颜丙燕	Enemy 对手

=== 2000s ===
Year	Number	Actress	Television Series
2000	18th	Zhou Xun 周迅	Palace of Desire\大明宫词
2000	18th	Yuan Li 袁立	Never Close the Eye\永不瞑目
2000	18th	Xu Xiulin 徐秀林	Loquacious Zhang Damin's Happy Life \贫嘴张大民的幸福生活

=== 1990s ===
Year	Number	Actress	Television Series
1999	17th	Yang Kun 杨昆	Mother in law, Daughter in law, Sister in law\婆婆·媳妇·小姑
1999	17th	He Lin 何琳	To Lead by the Hand\牵手
1999	17th	Gai Lili 盖丽丽	The Silver Chamber\银楼

Year	Winner	For
1998	Yan Bingyan 颜丙燕	The Formations of the Red Cross 红十字方队
1997	Xi Meijuan 奚美娟	The Family and Love 儿女情长
1996	Deng Jie 邓婕	Prime Minister Liu Luoguo 宰相刘罗锅
1995	Yang Kun 杨昆	Miss China in a Foreign Company 洋行里的中国小姐
1994	Liu Bei刘蓓	To Satisfy 过把瘾
1993	Jin Meng 金梦	Feng Yu Li Ren 风雨丽人
1992	Wu Mian 吴冕	Shanghai Family 上海一家人
1991	Han Ying 韩影	Hope 渴望
1990	Li Yuanyuan 李媛媛	Shanghai Morning 上海的早晨

=== 1980s ===
Year	Winner	For
1989	not awarded this year	
1988	Ni Ping 倪萍	Snow City 雪城
1987	Deng Jie 邓婕	Dream of the Red Chamber 红楼梦
1986	Li Wanfen 李婉芬	The Yellow Storm 四世同堂
1985	Hong Xuemin 洪学敏	The Homeland 故土
1984	Wang Yumei 王玉梅	Wreaths at the Foot of the Mountain 高山下的花环
1983	not awarded this year	
