= Taizu Mishi =

- Promotional poster
- Also known as: Secret History of the Great Grand King
- 太祖秘史
- Genre: Historical drama
- Written by: Li Xiaoming; Ke Zhanghe
- Directed by: You Xiaogang
- Presented by: You Xiaogang; Zhu Tong
- Starring: Steve Ma; Vivian Chen; Wu Qianqian; Zhao Hongfei; Shi Xiaoqun; Liu Guanxiang; Jin Qiaoqiao; Cheng Lisha; Tu Honggang
- Opening theme: "Vast Steppe" (莽原) by Tu Honggang
- Composer: Zhou Zhiyong
- Country of origin: China
- Original language: Mandarin
- No. of episodes: 46

Production
- Executive producers: Wang Guohui; Yang Qun; Fu Si
- Producers: Yang Qun; You Xiaogang; Lin Wei; Xue Wanguo
- Production location: China
- Cinematography: Ye Zhiwei; Xue Wanguo
- Editors: Zhang Zhong; Cao Qi
- Running time: ≈45 minutes per episode

Original release
- Network: CCTV

Related
- Xiaozhuang Mishi; Huang Taizi Mishi; Secret History of Kangxi

Taizu Mishi (太祖秘史; Secret History of the Grand Ancestor) is a 2005 Chinese historical television series produced by You Xiaogang. The series is the third instalment in a series of four television series set in the early Qing dynasty. It was preceded by Xiaozhuang Mishi (2003) and Huang Taizi Mishi (2004), and followed by Secret History of Kangxi (2006), all of which were also produced by You Xiaogang. The series romanticises the life of Nurhaci, the founder of the Qing dynasty.

== Synopsis ==
The series is based on the life of Nurhaci, the founder of the Qing dynasty. Nurhaci started his life of a warrior-king by uniting the Jurchen (later called Manchu) tribes under his rule. In addition to suppressing the threat of internal conflict, Nurhaci attacks the Ming Empire's territories in northern China. Nurhaci helped to build a strong foundation for his son and successor, Huangtaiji, who eventually conquers the Ming Empire and establishes the Qing Empire.

Nurhaci is also entangled in five romantic relationships throughout his life. The five women are Menggu, Naqiya, Dongge, Abahai, and Tunggiya Qingya. Dongge is a renowned beauty from the plains and loves both Nurhaci and his brother Surhaci. Tunggiya Qingya is Nurhaci's primary consort and the mother of Cuyen and Daisan. Menggu is the mother of Hong Taiji and a beautiful woman with a mysterious past. Abahai is his favorite during his later years and the mother of Dodo, Dorgon, and Ajige. Naqiya is the former wife of Li Rubai, but she later marries Surhaci.

== Cast ==
- Steve Ma as Nurhaci
- Vivian Chen as Dongge / Deyinze
- Wu Qianqian as Tunggiya Qingya
- Zhao Hongfei as Surhaci
- Shi Xiaoqun as Empress Xiaocigao
- Liu Guanxiang as Jintaiji
- Jin Qiaoqiao as Naqiya
- Cheng Lisha as Lady Abahai
- Ma Yue as Zhantai
- Wang Xufeng as Nalin
- Xu Min as Li Chengliang
- Wang Qi as Li Rubai
- Tu Honggang as Taksi
- Deng Limin as Giocangga
- Liu Can as Huangtaiji
- William Lee as Cuyen
  - Wu Jiacheng as Cuyen (young)
- Shi An as Daišan
- Wang Wenjun as Amin
- Mao Linying as Xingniya
- Chen Yina as Hadaqi
- Yu Jun as Jirgalang
- Bo Guanjun as Nikan Wailan
- Li Nan as Fiongdon
- Jiang Tianyang as Eyidu
- Tang Guoqiang as Anfei Yanggu
- Han Dong as He Heli
- Chen Long as Huerhan
