= Xiaozhuang Mishi =

- Promotional poster
- Also known as: Xiaozhuang Epic
- 孝庄秘史
- Genre: Historical drama
- Written by: Yang Haiwei; Guo Wenpu
- Directed by: You Xiaogang; Liu Dekai
- Presented by: You Xiaogang
- Starring: Ning Jing; Steve Ma; Liu Dekai; Wu Qianqian; He Saifei; Zhao Hongfei; Hu Jing; Xu Min; Yan Kun; Shu Chang; Li Lingyu; Bai Qinglin
- Theme music composer: Zhang Hongguang
- Opening theme: "You" (你) by Tu Honggang
- Ending theme: "Beauty's Song" (美人吟) by Li Lingyu
- Country of origin: China
- Original language: Mandarin
- No. of episodes: 38

Production
- Producers: You Xiaogang; Yang Qun
- Production location: China
- Running time: ≈45 minutes per episode

Original release
- Network: CTV

Related
- Huang Taizi Mishi; Taizu Mishi; Secret History of Kangxi

Xiaozhuang Mishi ("Secret History of Xiaozhuang"), also known as Xiaozhuang Epic (孝庄秘史), is a 2003 Chinese historical drama television series produced by You Xiaogang. The series is the first instalment in a series of four television series set in the early Qing dynasty. It was followed by Huang Taizi Mishi (2004), Taizu Mishi (2005) and Secret History of Kangxi (2006), all of which were also produced by You Xiaogang. The series romanticises the life of Empress Dowager Xiaozhuang.

== Synopsis ==
Dayuer is a Khorchin princess deeply in love with Dorgon, a son of the Later Jin khan Nurhaci. She soon becomes the concubine of Dorgon's half-brother Huangtaiji. Huangtaiji has already married Dayuer's aunt, Jerjer, to secure an alliance between the Khorchins and Later Jin. Huangtaiji initially has feelings for Dayuer, but realises that she only loves Dorgon, so he directs his affection to her sister Harjol.

With support from Dorgon and his brother Dodo, Huangtaiji succeeds their father as khan and establishes the Qing dynasty to replace the Later Jin. However, Dorgon and Huangtaiji have a strained relationship because of Dayuer and the forced suicide of Dorgon's mother Lady Abahai.

After Huangtaiji's death, Dayuer's son Fulin takes the throne while Dayuer becomes empress dowager, with Dorgon ruling as regent. As Fulin grows older, he becomes increasingly distrustful of Dorgon after discovering his mother's ongoing secret affair with Dorgon. After Dorgon's sudden death, Fulin strips him of his honours.

Fulin dies shortly after the passing of his beloved concubine, Consort Donggo, leaving his young son, Xuanye, to succeed him as emperor. Now grand empress dowager, Dayuer provides guidance and support to her grandson.

== Cast ==
- Ning Jing as Dayuer
- Steve Ma as Dorgon
- Liu Dekai as Huangtaiji
- Wu Qianqian as Jerjer
- Zhao Hongfei as Dodo
- Hu Jing as Sumalagu
- He Saifei as Harjol
- Siqin Gaowa as Lady Abahai
- Xu Huanshan as Nurhaci
- Xu Min as Daišan
- Li Lingyu as Noble Consort Yijing
- Bai Qinglin as Xiaoyuer
- Yan Kun as Fulin
  - Chen Weichen as Fulin (teenager)
  - Wang Peiwen as Fulin (older child)
  - Li Yifan as Fulin (younger child)
- Shu Chang as Consort Donggo
  - Yang Zi as Consort Donggo (younger)
- Lu Jun as Hooge
- Mi Tiezeng as Fan Wencheng
- Shen Baoping as Amin
- Guo Minghan as Manggūltai
- Wu Zitong as Namuzhong
  - Guo Yufeng as Namuzhong (younger)
- Wang Ge as Mengguqing
  - Li Yuan as Mengguqing (younger)
- Gao Haiyan as Huige
- Zhu Kun as Xiaotang
  - Doudou as Xiaotang (younger)
- Wang Hui as Heluohui
- Fu Junfeng as Bombogor
  - Han Yuqiao as Bombogor (teenager)
  - Guo Zihao as Bombogor (child)
- Sun Bin as Hong Chengchou
- Zhang Yongjing as Johann Adam Schall von Bell
- Wan Yan as Zhenge
- Zhang Lili as Xiaonizi
- Wang Hong as Manggusi
- Tu Wenxue as Jirgalang
- Ji Yongqing as Wukeshan
- Sun Qiang as the Chongzhen Emperor
- Wang Gang as Yuan Chonghuan
- Li Lan as Nanny Li
- Di Jianqing as Eshuo
- Hu Yao as Lingzi
- Li Jing as Chunyu
- Wu Pengda as Xuanye
- Bao Dexin as Prince Jian

== Reception ==
Xiaozhuang Mishi first aired on HNETV (湖南經視綜合頻道) on 31 December 2002. It reached first place in audience measurement in some provinces of China.
