= Li Lingyu =

Chinese singer and actress

- 李玲玉
- Born: 9 April 1963 (age 62); Shanghai, China
- Occupations: Singer, actress, anchorwoman
- Years active: 1989–1993, 2005–present
Li Lingyu

Li Lingyu (born 9 April 1963 in Shanghai) is a Chinese singer and actress.

== Biography ==
Li was born in Shanghai in 1963. She is a student of the notable singer Wang Kun.

In 1980, she was admitted to the Beijing Red Flag Yue Opera Company, performing Yue opera. In 1984, she joined the China Oriental Song and Dance Troupe. There she met her first husband and married at the age of 21.

Her first television role was in the 1986 adaptation of Journey to the West. She released her first album in 1987, Sweet Song Queen.

In 1993, she moved to Japan, partly because of marital difficulties, and worked there for two years as an anchorwoman for MTV Japan.

Li migrated to Canada in 1995, married a Canadian investment manager in 1997, and gave birth to a son in 2000.

In 2005, she was appointed a part-time lecturer at the School of Continuing Education in California. She also returned to singing with a RMB one million deal for her successful album Beauty Chant.

== Filmography ==
=== Films ===
- 1988: A Mysterious Heroine as Wu Qi / Ning Ning
- 1988: A Dream of Red Mansions as Third Sister You
- 1989: Sister Outlaw as singer
- 1990: The Ninth Unresolved Case as Su Chunni
- 2005: Life Adventure (musical 3-D film) as Yu the Sun Goddess
- 2010: Chongqing Blues as Fang Hui
- 2012: Harpoon as Laura
- 2016: When We Were Young as Fang Ziyun
- 2018: Equity Situation as Li Xuehui
- 2019: Pegasus as Zhu Chunjuan

=== Television ===
- 1986: Journey to the West as Yu Tu / Princess Jade Rabbit
- 1992: Stories from the Editorial Board as Fei Lili
- 1993: Haima Song and Dance Hall as friendship guest appearance
- 1994: Temporary Family as friendship guest appearance
- 2002: Legendary Li Cui Lian II as Yan Guifei
- 2004: Xiaozhuang Mishi as an imperial concubine
- 2012: The youth I never indulged as Liang Yiyun
- 2013: Military woman as Ming Kexin
- 2014: New Moment in Peking as Yao's wife
- 2014: The Love Is Inconceivable as cameo
- 2015: The Cage of Love as Mrs. Jiang
- 2015: Cao Cao as Lady Ding
- 2017: Love of Aurora as Lei Cai Ying (Li Ming Zhe's mother)
- 2020: Storm in the Black River as Lin Yin
- 2020: Qing Qing Zi Jin as Yu Maid
