= Out of Inferno =

2013 Hong Kong-Chinese film by the Pang brothers

- Chinese theatrical release poster
- Directed by: Danny Pang; Oxide Pang
- Written by: Szeto Kam-Yuen
- Produced by: Daneil Lam; Danny Pang; Oxide Pang
- Starring: Sean Lau; Louis Koo; Chen Sicheng; Angelica Lee
- Cinematography: Anthony Pun
- Edited by: Curran Pang
- Music by: Peter Kam; Wong Kin-wai
- Production companies: Universe Entertainment; Sun Entertainment Culture; Bona Film Group; Golala Investment; Enable Film Production
- Distributed by: Universe Film Distribution
- Release dates: 30 September 2013 (China); 3 October 2013 (Hong Kong)
- Running time: 107 mins
- Countries: Hong Kong; China
- Languages: Cantonese; Mandarin
- Budget: HK$150 million (US$19 million)
- Box office: US$24,109,886

Out of Inferno (Chinese: 逃出生天; pinyin: Táo Chūshēng Tiān; Jyutping: tou4 ceot1 sang1 tin1) is a 2013 disaster film directed by the Pang Brothers released on 3 October 2013. A Hong Kong-Chinese co-production, the film stars Sean Lau, Louis Koo and Angelica Lee. It revolves around a fire that engulfs a high-rise building in southern China and the subsequent rescue mission by the city's fire department.

== Plot ==
The film stars two estranged brothers in Guangzhou, Tai-kwan and Keung, who work as firefighters. The last time they spoke with one another was during the funeral of their father, four years before the events of the film. Keung, now retired from firefighting, operates a fire protection systems company. In the beginning of the film, he holds a celebration of the opening of the office of his company. Meanwhile, Tai-kwan's wife, Si-lok, is seeing a gynaecologist. The company and the doctor are in the same building. A fire breaks out in the basement and travels upwards. Tai-kwan, who submits his resignation before the fire breaks out, sends in his unit to fight the fire. Keung finds Si-lok and struggles to rescue her.

== Cast ==
- Sean Lau as Tai-kwan (大军; 大軍; Dàjūn; daai6 gwan1)
- Louis Koo as Keung (阿强; 阿強; Ā-qiáng)
- Chen Sicheng as Lee Kin-lok (李健乐; 李健樂; Lǐ Jiànlè), Si Lok's doctor
- Angelica Lee as Si-lok (思乐; 思樂; Sīlè), Tai Kwan's wife
- Marc Ma as Ho, jewelry store worker
- Jin Qiaoqiao as Mei-mei (美美; Měiměi; mei5 mei5), Shun's wife
- Crystal Lee (李馨巧) as Lam-lam (琳琳; Línlín; lam4 lam4), Mei-mei and Shun's daughter
- Zang Jinsheng as Ko Sing, head of security guard
- Cheung Siu-fai as Shun (阿信; Ā-xìn), May May's husband
- Joe Ma as Lau Ting, head of fire department
- Natalie Tong as Ping-ping, Keung's fiancé
- Benz Hui as Boss Suen, owner of the jewelry store
- Tian Zhenwei as Dong, jewelry store worker
- Terence Siufay as Bo-keung, security guard
- Jackie Xu as Mandy, Keung's assistant

== Production ==
The Pang Brothers went to great lengths to ensure authenticity of the fire scenes, actual fire was used for the majority of the film to bring out the actual visceral fear from the cast. The film had a budget of HK$150 million (US$19 million).

== Reception ==
Yvonne Teh of the South China Morning Post gave the film three out of five stars. Teh stated that the script "looks a clear case of too many cooks spoiling the broth" and that Szeto Kam-yuen's death had harmed it. Teh stated that the acting of Koo, Lau, and Lee benefited the film and that "the raging fire, which hisses, roars, and moves in ways that resembles a mythical, dragon-like creature at times, is suitably menacing, and ensures that there are scenes in this action thriller that do feel suspenseful." Teh argued that the film is "weakest when the attention is focused on hackneyed minor characters" with the diamond cutter characters being the "lamest of all".

Film Business Asia's Derek Elley gave the film a 7/10 rating.
