= Steve Ma =

- 馬景濤
- Born: 14 February 1962 (age 64); Taichung County, Taiwan
- Education: National Taichung Second Senior High School; Taipei World News Vocational School Shih Shin University
- Occupation: Actor
- Years active: 1984–present
- Spouses: Tang Yun (m. 1990–1993) Wu Jia'ni (m. 2007–2017)
- Children: 3
- Musical career

Chinese name
- Traditional Chinese: 馬景濤
- Simplified Chinese: 马景涛
Transcriptions
Standard Mandarin
- Hanyu Pinyin: Mǎ Jǐngtāo
Southern Min
- Hokkien POJ: Má Kéng-tô

Stephen Ma Jingtao (Chinese: 馬景濤; Pe̍h-ōe-jī: Má Kéng-tô; born 14 February 1962) is a Taiwanese actor best known for acting in many Taiwanese, mainland Chinese and Singaporean television series since the early 1990s. Most of the more notable television series he acted in are of the wuxia and historical drama genres. Some of his notable roles in television series include: Zhang Wuji in The Heaven Sword and Dragon Saber (1994); Lü Dongbin in Legend of the Eight Immortals (1999); Linghu Chong in The Legendary Swordsman (2000); Dorgon in Xiaozhuang Mishi (2002); Nurhaci in Taizu Mishi (2005); King Zhou of Shang in The Legend and the Hero (2007).

== Early life ==
Ma was born and raised in Taichung County, Taiwan, as the second of four children in his family. His ancestral home is in Suizhong County, Liaoning, China. He attended National Taichung Second Senior High School and graduated from Taipei World News Vocational School's Department of Radio and Television with a certificate in journalism.

== Career ==
Ma started his acting career by appearing in minor roles in Taiwanese television series such as The Former Husband, The Morning Fog and Guilty, before making his film debut in Spring Swallow in 1989. In the same year, he was nominated for the Golden Bell Award for Best Actor for portraying Zhang Changgui in Spring Come Again After Leave. He was nominated for the Golden Bell Award for Best Actor again in 1990 for his role as Luo Zhigang in Xue Ke.

In 1994, Ma starred as Zhang Wuji alongside Hong Kong actresses Kathy Chow and Cecilia Yip in the Taiwanese wuxia television series The Heaven Sword and Dragon Saber, an adaptation of the wuxia novel of the same title by Louis Cha. In 1998, he portrayed Lü Dongbin, one of the Eight Immortals in Chinese mythology, in the Singaporean television series Legend of the Eight Immortals. In 2000, he starred as Linghu Chong in the Singaporean television series The Legendary Swordsman, an adaptation of the wuxia novel The Smiling, Proud Wanderer by Louis Cha.

Ma became more prominent in television after portraying the Qing dynasty regent Dorgon in the 2002 Chinese historical television series Xiaozhuang Mishi, which reached the top position in viewership when it was aired in mainland China and Taiwan. In 2003, he portrayed the Qing dynasty prince Yunreng in Huang Taizi Mishi. He starred as Nurhaci, the founder of the Qing dynasty, in the 2005 Chinese television series Taizu Mishi.

In 2007, Ma starred as the antagonist King Zhou of Shang in The Legend and the Hero, a 2007 Chinese television series adapted from the 16th century Chinese mythological fantasy novel Fengshen Yanyi. In 2012, he appeared as King Fuchai of Wu in the Chinese historical television series The Legend of Xishi.

== Personal life ==
Ma was twice married. His first marriage was to Tang Yun (唐韻) and they have a daughter, Ma Shiyuan (馬世媛; born 1991). After divorcing Tang in 1993, he married Chinese actress Wu Jia'ni (吳佳妮) in 2007; the couple divorced in 2017. They have two children, Ma Shitian (馬世天) and Ma Shixin (馬世心).

== Filmography ==
=== Film ===
Year	English Title	Chinese Title	Role	Notes
1989	Spring Swallow	晚春情事		
1990	Honor Thy Father	感恩岁月		
1991	When Dreams Come True	明月几时圆		
1994		海角危情	Du Weigen	
2012	Lu Junyi	玉麒麟卢俊义	Lu Junyi	
2015	Baby, Sorry	宝贝，对不起		

=== Television ===
Year	English title	Chinese title	Role	Notes
1984		星星的故乡	Jiang Yiping	
1985	The Morning Fog	晓雾		
1985		我们都是这样上当的		
1985		情爱三章之第二章：协力车再见		
1985		也是冬天		
1985		孤剑恩仇记	Qiu Dongli	
1986		实习医生的故事		
1986		1986凤还巢		
1986		一万里外		
1986		老树浓荫		
1986		特种芳邻		
1986	Guilty	罪爱		
1986		梧桐夜雨	Kang Yizhen	
1987		绮夫人的故事		
1987	The Former Husband	前夫		
1987		冷月孤星剑	Qin Bin	
1987		花落春犹在		
1988		意乱情迷	Fang Jiazhi	
1988		谁杀了大明星	Yang Ming	
1989	Spring Come Again After Leave	春去春又回	Zhang Changgui	
1989		缘定今生	Song Yalun	
1989		情深无怨尤	Wen Lichen	
1990	Xue Ke	雪珂	Luo Zhigang	
1990		家有贵夫	Feng Fan'gao	
1990		没有合约的爱情	Wei Changfeng/ Wei Changlin	
1990		末代儿女情	Tong Cheng'en	
1990		刺客列传	Crown Prince Dan	
1991		七亿新娘	Li Xiang	
1992		戏说慈喜	Sushun	
1992	Green Green Grass By The River	青青河边草	He Shiwei	
1993		梅花三弄：梅花烙	Hao Zhen	
1993		梅花三弄：水云间	Mei Ruohong	
1994	The Heaven Sword and Dragon Saber	倚天屠龙记	Zhang Cuishan/ Zhang Wuji	
1994		人面桃花	Cui Hu	
1995	Huang Feihong and Shi Sanyi	黄飞鸿与十三姨	Qi Tianci	
1995		今生今世	Ye Yilong/ Liu Hanxing	
1995		包青天之侠骨神算	Shao Yong	
1996	The New Longmen Roadhouse	新龙门客栈	Zhou Huai'an	
1996	The Good Old Days	再见艳阳天	Fong Ho Sang/ Chen Kang	
1996		计中计状元财之偷天换日	Fu Jingyang	
1997	Love Is Payable	侬本多情	Bai Lang	
1997	Fated Love	天长地久	Fu Sounam	
1998	Legend of the Eight Immortals	东游记	Lü Dongbin	
1998		明天有你	Liang Guanglei	
1999	The Legendary Swordsman	笑傲江湖	Linghu Chong	
2000		奈何花	Xu Tingwen	
2000		新蜀山剑侠	Ding Yin	
2001		家族利益	Liu Shishen	
2001		移山倒海樊梨花	Xue Dingshan/Xiang Yu	
2001	The Legendary Siblings	绝世双骄	Ba Dao	guest
2002	Xiaozhuang Mishi	孝庄秘史	Dorgon	
2002		春花秋月	Liu Zhenbang	
2003	Huang Taizi Mishi	皇太子秘史	Yunreng	
2003	Love in a Miracle	爱在有情天	Sum Yau Yin / Suen Yau Yin	
2004		魔界之龙珠	Cha Mulong	
2004		为你燃烧	Wen Feng	
2005	Taizu Mishi	太祖祕史	Nurhaci	
2005	The Jade King	翡翠王	Tang Yuren	
2005	The Legend and the Hero	封神榜封神榜	King Zhou of Shang	
2008		东归英雄	Wobaxi	
2008		一路夫妻	Qiu Yingjie	
2011	The Legend of Xishi	西施秘史	King Fuchai of Wu	

== Theater ==
Year	English title	Chinese title	Role	Notes
1992	Death of a Salesman	推销员之死	Buf	
2008	Like Shadows	如影随行	Da Qiao	

== Awards and nominations ==
Year	Title	Award	Result
1989	Spring Come Again After Leave	Golden Bell Award for Best Actor	Nominated
1990	Xue Ke	Golden Bell Award for Best Actor	Nominated
2005		Drama Festival - Favorite Actor	Won
2012		Anhui Television - Asian Idol Award	Won
