= Gabula (general) =

Duke and military general during the Qing Dynasty

Chief Minister

Duke of the First Rank
- Monarch: Kangxi Emperor

Personal details
- Died: 1681
- Children: Changtai; Empress Xiaochengren; Consort Ping
- Parent: Sonin (father)
- Clan: Heseri
- Noble Rank: 1st class Duke
- Posthumous name: Kexi 恪僖

Gabula (Chinese: 噶布喇; died 1681) of the Manchu Hešeri clan was a duke and military general during the Qing Dynasty. He was Empress Xiaochengren's father, maternal grandfather of the crown prince Yinreng, and son of Sonin (duke of the First Rank, one of the Four Regents of the Kangxi Emperor).
