= Sonin (regent) =

Regent of China from 1661 to 1667

First Class Duke Sonin

Regent of the Qing Dynasty
- In office 5 February 1661 – 12 August 1667 Serving with Ebilun, Suksaha, Oboi
- Appointed by: Empress Dowager Zhaosheng
- Monarch: Kangxi Emperor

Personal details
- Born: 1601
- Died: 12 August 1667 (aged 65–66)
- Relations: Tong Guowei (son-in-law); Empress Xiaochengren (granddaughter); Yinreng (great-grandson)
- Children: Songgotu (son) Gabula (son)
- Clan name: Hešeri
- Posthumous name: Wenzhong (文忠)

Military service
- Allegiance: Qing dynasty
- Branch/service: Manchu Plain Yellow Banner

Sonin (1601 – 12 August 1667), also known as Soni, and rarely Sony (Manchu: ᠰᠣᠨᡳᠨ; Chinese: 索尼; pinyin: Suǒní), was a Manchu noble of the Hešeri clan who served as one of the Four Regents of the Kangxi Emperor (r. 1661 – 1722) during the Qing dynasty (1644 – 1912). His clan belonged to the Plain Yellow Banner.

== Early life ==
Soni's father 硕色 (Šose) and uncle Hife, who were both fluent in Mandarin, Mongolian and Manchu, served as high officials under Manchu patriarch Nurhaci (1559–1626). Like them, Soni was valued for his linguistic abilities. In 1628, under Nurhaci's successor Hong Taiji (1592–1643), Soni led a successful diplomatic mission to convince the recently surrendered Khorchin Mongols to honor their pledge to help the Manchus militarily. In 1629 he was named to the newly created "Literary Office" (pinyin: wenguan), an institution that kept a detailed record of Manchu history and translated Chinese books about statecraft and Chinese and Korean state documents into Manchu. In 1630 Soni was ordered to remain in recently conquered Chinese cities to supervise surrendered Chinese leaders and commanders.

By 1643, Soni had become "grand minister of the imperial bodyguard," and when Hong Taiji died in September of that year, Soni used his allies in the guards unit and the yellow banners to ensure that only a son of Hong Taiji would succeed to the Qing throne. Soon after Dorgon (1612–1650) was chosen as Prince Regent for Hong Taiji's son Fulin—who reigned as the Shunzhi Emperor from 1643 to his death in 1661—the Manchu victory at the Battle of Shanhai Pass in late May 1644 allowed the Qing to take control of north China and to move their capital from Mukden to Beijing. Despite repeated military successes in the south, in 1645 factional struggles started around Dorgon. Deeply involved in many of the factional struggles of the second half of the 1640s, Soni was in turn favored, sentenced to death, pardoned, dismissed from office, reinstated, and dismissed again in 1648, the last time for good.

== As regent ==
Before the Shunzhi Emperor died, Soni was appointed as one of the four regents to support the young Kangxi Emperor, along with Suksaha, Ebilun and Oboi. Soni was the top of these four regents and ably helped the young emperor defend against Oboi, who wanted to increase his own power over the emperor. During the first years of Kangxi's reign, a power struggle ensued among the regents. Soni was too old to exert his leadership. His son Songgotu helped the young emperor to get rid of Oboi.

On 16 October 1665, the eleven-year-old Kangxi Emperor took Soni's grand daughter, Lady Hešeri (1653–1674), who was a few months older than him, as his Empress. Because Soni's powerful family would now presumably support the emperor, this marriage split the regency.

== Death ==
Sonin died on 12 August 1667. His death provoked a series of changes in the regency: just as the other regents, led by Oboi, tried to consolidate their power, the emperor vied to assert his own power.
