= Dai Rao =

Chinese singer and actress (born 1972)

- 戴娆
- Born: April 2, 1972 (age 54); Beijing, China
- Education: Beijing Dance Academy
- Occupations: Singer, actress
- Years active: 1993-2010
- Children: 2

Chinese name
- Traditional Chinese: 戴嬈
- Simplified Chinese: 戴娆
Transcriptions
Standard Mandarin
- Hanyu Pinyin: Dài Ráo
- Musical career
- Genres: Mandopop
- Label: Yibo Culture

Dai Rao (Chinese: 戴娆; born 2 April 1972) is a Chinese singer and actress.

== Early life and education ==
Dai was born in Beijing on 2 April 1972. Her parents divorced in 1980, when she was 8. In October 1993, she entered Beijing Dance Academy.

== Career ==
Dai's debut solo album, Close to You, Gently Say Love You, was released in April 1994. In March 1995, she held a solo concert in Japan.

On 15 February 1991, she performed at the CCTV New's Eve on China Central Television.

Her 4th album, titled Perfect Thing, was released in May 2004.

Her 5th album, titled Blooming, was released in August 2006.

In February 2009, she released her 6th album Love Tips.

== Personal life ==
Dai married on 10 July 2010, in Beijing. She has two children.

== Discography ==
=== Studio album ===
| # | English title | Chinese Title | Released | Label | Notes |
|---|---|---|---|---|---|
| 1st | Close to You, Gently Say Love You | 靠近你，轻轻说爱你 | April 1994 | | |
| 2nd | Flying Birds | 心放飞 | September 1995 | | |
| 3rd | Thoughts are Like the Tide | 思绪如潮 | December 1997 | | |
| 4th | Perfect Thing | 锦上添花 | May 2004 | | |
| 5th | Blooming | 绽放 | August 2006 | | |
| 6th | Love Tips | 爱情锦囊妙计 | February 2009 | | |

== Filmography ==
=== Television series ===
| Year | English Title | Chinese Title | Role | Notes |
|---|---|---|---|---|
| 1995 | Empress Dowager Ci Xi Going to the West | 慈禧西行 | Zhu Xiaoxin | |
| 1997 | Records of Kangxi's Travel Incognito | 康熙微服私访记 | Bande Caiyun | |
| 1997 | —N/a | 张灯结彩之好事多磨 | | |
| 1997 | Amazing Detective of Beijing | 京都神探 | Ya Xian | |
| 1998 | The Sun Comes Out | 太阳出世 | | |
| 2001 | —N/a | 东西奇遇结良缘 | Xiong Zhenzhu | |
| 2002 | —N/a | 男人四十跑出租 | | |
| 2003 | Seeing Flowers Again | 又见花儿开 | Wu Yufeng | |
| 2003 | Legend of Emperor of the Jade Emperor | 玉帝传奇 | Gui Zhi | |
| 2003 | The Distant Beijing People | 远去的北京人 | | |
| 2003 | Laowei's Project X | 老威的X计划 | Sun Feifei | |
| 2003 | Out of the Lanshui River | 走出蓝水河 | Xing Zi | |
| 2004 | Blood Vows | 血色誓言 | Meng Shiyan | |
| 2004 | The Juvenile Qianlong Emperor | 少年宝亲王 | Mei Xiang | |
| 2005 | China Flower | 青花 | Bo Xiaowen | |
| 2006 | Shanghai Fog | 上海迷雾 | | |
