= Deng Jie =

Chinese actress

- Born: 21 October 1958 (age 67); Chengdu, Sichuan, China
- Education: Sichuan Sichuanese Opera Academy
- Occupation: Actress
- Years active: 1984 - present
- Spouse: Zhang Guoli
- Children: Zhang Mo (Stepson)
- Parent(s): Deng Quru (邓渠如); Zou Kaiqiong (邹开琼)
- Awards: Golden Eagle Awards – Best Supporting Actress; 1987 A Dream of Red Mansions; 1996 Prime Minister Liu Luoguo

Chinese name
- Traditional Chinese: 鄧婕
- Simplified Chinese: 邓婕
Transcriptions
Standard Mandarin
- Hanyu Pinyin: Dèng Jié

Deng Jie (simplified Chinese: 邓婕; traditional Chinese: 鄧婕, born October 21, 1958) is a Chinese actress and producer. Deng was born in Chengdu and attended the Qiujing High School in Chongqing. In 1973, she trained at the Sichuan Opera School.

She portrayed Wang Xifeng in TV series Dream of the Red Chamber and became well known in mainland China. Her husband is Zhang Guoli, a noted Chinese actor and director.

== Filmography ==
=== Film ===
Year	English title	Chinese title	Role	Notes
1987	The Romance of Book & Sword	书剑恩仇录	Xu Chaosheng	
1988	The King Songtsan Gambo	松赞干布		

=== Television ===
Year	English title	Chinese title	Role	Notes
1987	Dream of the Red Chamber	红楼梦	Wang Xifeng	Golden Eagle Award for Best Supporting Actress; Feitian Award for Outstanding Supporting Actress
1988	Si Shui Wei Lan	死水微澜	Liu Sanjin	
1996	Prime Minister Liu Luoguo	宰相刘罗锅	Liu's wife	Golden Eagle Award for Best Supporting Actress
1997	Cang Tian You Lei	苍天有泪	Jin Yinhua	
1998	Records of Kangxi's Travel Incognito	康熙微服私访记	Concubine Yi	Season 1-4
2001	The Life of Mine	我这一辈子	Rui Zi	
2003	Shuang Long Hui	双龙会	Da Mei	
2004	Wu Yue Huai Hua Xiang	五月槐花香	Ru Qiulan	
2011	You're My Lover	你是我爱人	Lin Haili	
