= Empress Xiaochengren =

Empress of China from 1665 to 1674

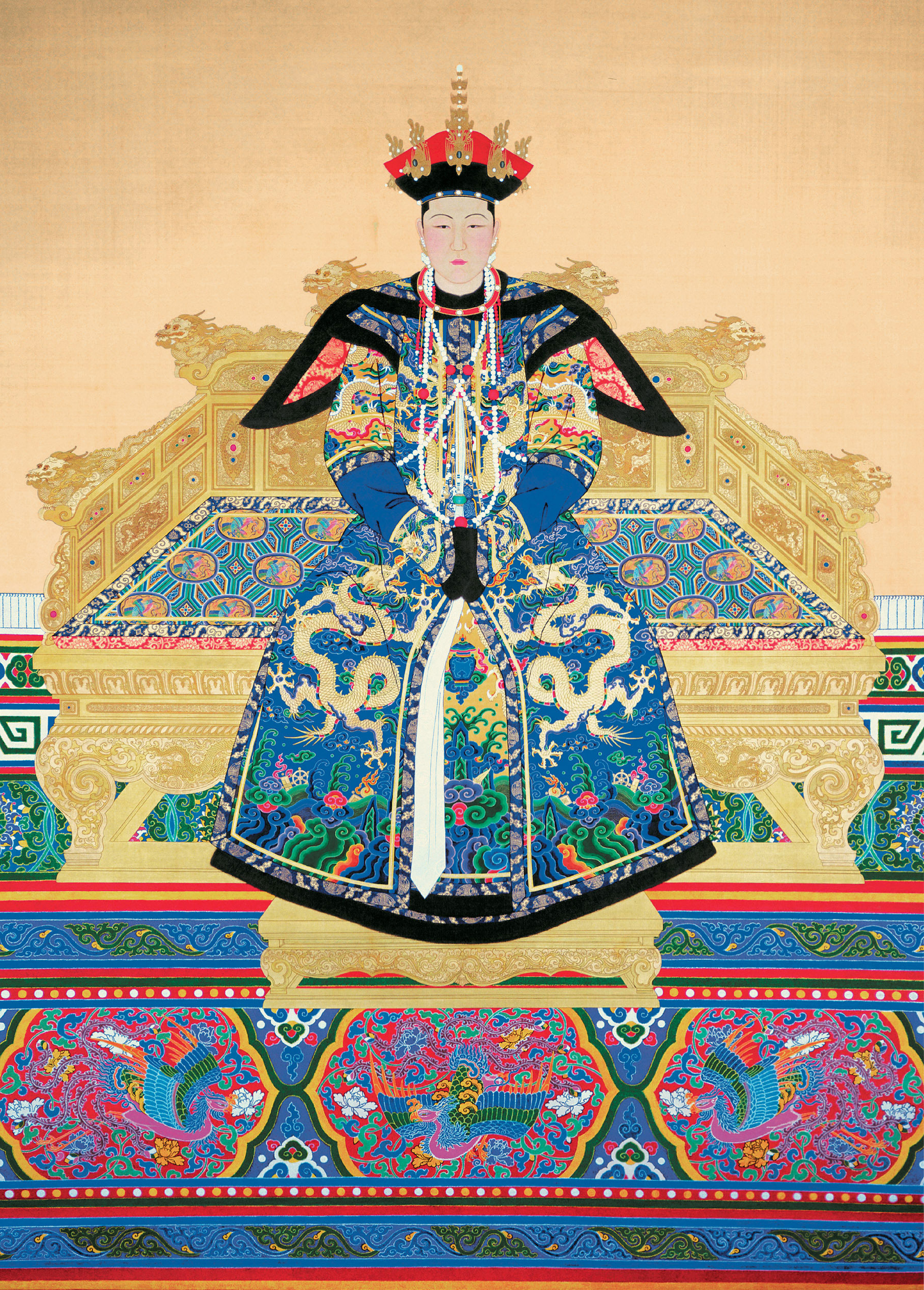

Empress consort of the Qing dynasty
- Tenure: October/November 1665 – 6 June 1674
- Predecessor: Empress Xiaohuizhang
- Successor: Empress Xiaozhaoren
- Born: 3 February 1654 (順治十年 十二月 十七日)
- Died: 6 June 1674 (aged 20) (康熙十三年 五月 三日); Palace of Earthly Tranquility
- Burial: Jing Mausoleum, Eastern Qing tombs
- Spouse: Kangxi Emperor (m. 1665)
- Issue: Chenghu; Yunreng, Prince Limi of the First Rank
Posthumous name
- Empress Xiaocheng Gongsu Zhenghui Anhe Shuyi Kemin Litian Xiangsheng Ren (孝誠恭肅正惠安和淑懿恪敏儷天襄聖仁皇后)
- House: Hešeri (by birth); Aisin-Gioro (by marriage)
- Father: Gabula

Empress Xiaochengren

Chinese name
- Traditional Chinese: 孝誠仁皇后
- Simplified Chinese: 孝诚仁皇后
Transcriptions
Standard Mandarin
- Hanyu Pinyin: Xiàochéngrén Huánghòu

Manchu name
- Manchu script: ᡥᡳᠶᠣᠣᡧᡠᠩᡤᠠ ᡠᠨᡝᠩᡤᡳ ᡤᠣᠰᡳᠨ ᡥᡡᠸᠠᠩᡥᡝᠣ
- Romanization: hiyoošungga unenggi gosin hūwangheo

Empress Xiaochengren (3 February 1654 – 6 June 1674), of the Manchu Plain Yellow Banner Hešeri clan, was a posthumous name bestowed to the wife and first empress consort of Xuanye, the Kangxi Emperor. She was empress consort of Qing from 1665 until her death in 1674. Although her marriage to the Emperor was initially arranged for purely political reasons, the Kangxi Emperor became truly fond of her. The Empress' death affected the Emperor deeply, leading him to take the unusual step of leaving the position of empress vacant for about three years after her death.

== Life ==
=== Family background ===
Empress Xiaochengren's personal name was not recorded in history. Before her death she was recorded as the Lady Hešeri.

- Father: Gabula (d.1681), served as a first rank military official (領侍衛內大臣), and held the title of a first class duke (一等公)
  - Paternal grandfather: Sonin (1601–1667), served as one of the Four Regents of the Kangxi Emperor, and held the title of a first class duke (一等公)
  - Third paternal uncle: Songgotu (1636–1703)
  - Fifth paternal uncle: Xinyu, held the title of a first class earl (一等伯)
  - Sixth paternal uncle: Fabao, held the title of a first class duke (一等公)
- Two younger brothers
  - Second younger brother: Changtai, served as a first rank military official, and held the title of a first class duke.
- Three sisters
  - younger sister: Consort Ping (d.1696)

Lady Hešeri's grandfather, Sonin (索尼; 1601–1667), served as one of the Four Regents of the Kangxi Emperor, and held the title of first class duke. Her father, Gabula (噶布喇; d.1681), served as a military general and also held a title of duke. One of her aunts married with the grandson of Nurhaci, Yolo (岳樂; 1625–1689), Prince of the first rank (和碩安親王); another aunt married with a grandson of Nurhaci, the son of Dodo (多鐸), Cani (察尼; 1640–1688), Prince of the third rank (多羅貝勒).

=== Shunzhi era ===
The future Empress Xiaochengren was born on the 17th day of the 12th lunar month in the tenth year of the reign of the Shunzhi Emperor, which translates to 3 February 1654 in the Gregorian calendar.

=== Kangxi era ===
In October or November 1665, Lady Hešeri married the Kangxi Emperor and became empress consort, in a marriage organised due to her powerful family, which was expected would assist the Emperor's rule. Although it was an arranged political marriage, the Kangxi Emperor was very fond of the Empress. On 4 January 1670, she gave birth to a son, Chenghu, who would die prematurely on 3 March 1672. The death of Prince Chenghu profoundly affected the Empress, and she became very sick. The Emperor was staying in Chicheng at the time, but upon receiving reports that Lady Hešeri was seriously ill, and he set off for Beijing immediately to take care of her. After the Empress recovered, she became pregnant again.

The Empress died on 6 June 1674 shortly after giving birth to the emperor's second son, Yunreng. Distraught at the death of his wife, the Kangxi Emperor made her son the crown prince, and left the position of empress vacant for three years. Eventually he remarried one of his consorts, Lady Niohuru, who became Empress Xiaozhaoren on 18 September 1677.

== Titles ==
- During the reign of the Shunzhi Emperor (r. 1643–1661):
  - Lady Hešeri (from 3 February 1654)
- During the reign of the Kangxi Emperor (r. 1661–1722):
  - Empress (皇后; from October/November 1665)
  - Empress Renxiao (仁孝皇后; from 1674)
- During the reign of the Yongzheng Emperor (r. 1722–1735):
  - Empress Renxiaoren (仁孝仁皇后; from June 1723)
  - Empress Xiaochengren (孝誠仁皇后; from July 1723)

== Issue ==
- As Empress:
  - Chenghu (承祜 (嫡长子); 4 January 1670 – 3 March 1672), the Kangxi Emperor's second son
  - Yunreng (允礽 (嫡次子); 6 June 1674 – 27 January 1725), the Kangxi Emperor's seventh (second) son, Crown Prince for his lifetime, posthumously honoured as Prince Limi of the First Rank

== In fiction and popular culture ==
- Portrayed by Li Chentao in Kangxi Dynasty (2001)
- Portrayed by Zhou Jia in Huang Taizi Mishi (2004)
- Portrayed by Chae Rim in Secret History of Kangxi (2006)
- Portrayed by Maggie Shiu in Palace (2011)
- Portrayed by Zhang Weina in Legend of Dragon Pearl (2017)

== See also ==
- Royal and noble ranks of the Qing dynasty

== Notes ==
Empress Xiaochengren House of Hešeri
Chinese royalty
Preceded by Alatan Qiqige, Empress Xiaohuizhang of the Borjigit clan	Empress consort of China; October/November 1665 – 6 June 1674	Succeeded by Empress Xiaozhaoren of the Niohuru clan
