= Jin Qiaoqiao =

Chinese actress, singer and hostess

- 金巧巧
- Born: 21 April 1975 (age 51); Heping District, Shenyang, Liaoning
- Education: Beijing Film Academy
- Occupations: Actress, singer, hostess
- Years active: 1993-present
- Agent: Yu Zheng Studio
- Notable work: Legend of Lu Zhen; The Legend of Yang Guifei; The Legend and the Hero
- Spouse: Yu Dong (m. 2011)
- Children: 1 daughter

Jin Qiaoqiao (Chinese: 金巧巧; pinyin: Jīn Qiǎoqiǎo; born 21 April 1975) is a Chinese actress, singer and hostess of ethnic Manchu origin.

Jin first rose to prominence in 1998 for playing Princess Kongque in the television series Journey to the West. The series reached number one in the ratings when it aired in China.

Jin has won the Favorite Actress Award at the Huading Awards and received nominations at the China Golden Eagle Awards.

== Life ==
=== Early life ===
Jin was born in a family of teachers in Heping District, Shenyang, Liaoning in April 1975, she started to learn artistic gymnastics at the age of 7 and learn ballet at the age of 8. Jin graduated from Beijing Film Academy in 1998, where she majored in acting.

=== Acting career ===
In 1995, Jin made her film debut in Crime, playing a minor role of Qin Yanmei.

In 1999, Jin played the role of Xia Lian in Through Taoyuan, for which she received nominations at the 17th China Golden Eagle Awards.

In 2003, Jin founded her company Beijing Qiaoqiao Movie and TV Cultural Communications co., LTD. She produced his television series The Perfect Match.

In 2005, Jin played the character Na Qiya in Secret History of the Great Grand King and received positive reviews.

In 2006, Jin appeared as Zhaoyang, a princess in Goguryeo, in the historical television series Legend of Xue Rengui.

Jin released her first single, Chocolate, in 2008.

In 2009, Jin played Princess Yuzhen in You Xiaogang's The Legend of Yang Guifei, an ancient costume comedy starring Anthony Wong, Wang Luoyong, Yin Tao and Elvis Tsui.

In 2010, Jin starred as Xiaonan in Brother's Happiness, which earned her a Favorite Actress Award at the Huading Awards. At the same year, Jin was cast in the film Legendary Amazons, opposite Richie Jen, Cecilia Cheung, Cheng Pei-pei and Liu Xiaoqing. Her debut album, titled As long as you happy, was released on April 25, 2010.

In 2011, Jin appeared as Concubine Wu in The Story of Xiang Mountain, alongside Fu Yiwei and Siqin Gaowa.

In 2012, Jin starred in a television series called Romance of Tang Kongfu with Chrissie Chau, Alex Fong, and Li Man. She also starred in Legend of Lu Zhen, a romantic historic drama series starring Zanilia Zhao, Chen Xiao, Maggie Cheung Ho-yee and Leanne Liu.

In 2013, Jin had a cameo appearance in Out of Inferno, a disaster film directed by the Pang Brothers.

In 2017, she starred as an Empress Dowager in the romance television series General and I.

== Personal life ==
Jin married businessman Yu Dong (于冬) in 2011. Their daughter was born on August 9, 2013.

== Works ==
=== Film ===
Year	English Title	Chinese Title	Role	Notes
1995	Winner	《赢家》	Ma Nana	
1995	Crime	《罪恶》	Qin Yanmei	
2002		《追剿魔头》	Tian A'mei	
2007	Dream of Being a Superstar	《明星梦》	Li Hongxia	
2008	Confidential Action	《机密行动》	An Shun'ai	
2009	Big Tree	《大树》	Ding Lan	
2009	City Card	《城市名片》	Ye Ziqing	
2009		《情系梧桐》	Long A'di	
2009	World too busy	《天下太忙》	Qin Wen	
2009	Beautiful Mother	《美丽妈妈》	Bixin	
2009	Legend of Foguang Temple	《佛光寺传奇》	Mei Yuying	
2010	The Sleeping Beauty	《睡美人》		
2011		《大爱凝天》	The head nurse	
2011	Legendary Amazons	《杨门女将之军令如山》	Yang Sanniang	
2011		《像小强一样活着》	Mrs.Li	
2012	I Want to Have a Dream	《我想有个梦》	Teacher Liu	
2012		《情系喀斯特》		
2012		《家里有我》	Bixin	
2013	Feed Me	《哺乳期的女人》	Teacher	
2013	Out of Inferno	《逃出生天》	Meimei	
2013	Affection Tricks	《追爱计中计》		
	Mister Also Crazy	《老总也疯狂》		
	Bring It On	《美少女啦啦队》	A professor	
2015	From Vegas to Macau II	《澳门风云2》	Aoi	
2015	Silently Love	《默守那份情》		
2017	Love Contractually	《合约男女》		
2024	A Legend	傳奇	Mengyun's mother	

=== Television ===
Year	English Title	Chinese Title	Role	Notes
1995		《雨天有故事》	Qiu Hong	
1996	Zhang Zhidong	《总督张之洞》	Xiao Taohong	
1996		《爱的湾道》	Qiao Tingting	
1996		《鱼鹰王》	Linghua	
1997		《燕子李三》	Qiu Hong	
1997		《新乱世佳人》	Dong Runyu	
1997	Hope	《希望》	Zuo Wei	
1997		《巡警日记》	Yi Dan	
1997		《千秋家国梦》	Yingzi	
1998		《沧海桑田一百》	Rongrong	
1998	Through Taoyuan	《走过柳源》	Xia Lian	
1998		《丰园餐厅》	Zhou Li	
1999	How Many Times can Love Come Back	《有多少爱可以重来》	Chen Yongyi	
1999	Journey to the West	《西游记续集》	Princess Kongque	
1999		《深圳不了情》	Jiu Xiang	
1999	Sunny Piggy	《春光灿烂猪八戒》	Princess	
2000	Desire	《欲望》	Bai Ling	
2000	Legend of Ji Gong	《济公传奇》	Princess Pingyang	
2000	Metropolis Emotion	《都市情感》	Ye Hong	
2000	The Defendant	《被告》	Jin Yu	
2001	Chen Zhen	《陈真后传》	Hong Jinmei	
2001		《红与黑》	Jiang Xue	
2002		《探长欧光慈》		
2002	The Legendary Siblings 2	《绝世双骄》	Guo Ruolan	
2003	The Perfect Match	《佳人有约》	Lin Aoxue	
2003		《飞刀问情》	Tang Mi	
2003		《国色天娇》	Chahua	
2004		《谁是最爱你的人》	Zhao Lan	
2004		《喜气洋洋猪八戒》	Ao Xue	
2005		《爸爸不容易》	Cheng Yingjuan	
2005	Taizu Mishi	《太祖秘史》	Na Qiya	
2005		《终极玄机》	Shanni	
2005		《爱我就给我一个家》	He Ru	
2006		《梦想的天空》	Zhao He	
2006		《薛仁贵传奇》	Princess Zhaoyang	
2006	The Legend and the Hero	《封神榜之凤鸣岐山》	Empress Jiang	
2006		《爱上朱大海》	Guoguo	
2007		《关东情》	Wang Xia	
2007	Legend of Sister Ma	《马大姐新传》	Ni Ayi	
2007	Jianzhen Crosses the Ocean to Japan	《鉴真东渡》	Wu Yulan	
2008	The County Magistrate: Laoye	《县长老叶》	Guaiguai	
2008	Husband and Wife	《结发夫妻》	Fang Hui	
2009	Clever Wife and Wise Mother	《贤妻良母》	Tingting	
2009		《当兵的人》	Yao Xiuhe	
2009	Braving the journey to Northeast	《闯关东》	Qiuyun	
2009		《那个代》	Zhang Sufang	
2009	The Legend of Yang Guifei	《杨贵妃秘史》	Princess Yuzhen	
2009	Brother's Happiness	《老大的幸福》	Xu Xiaonan	
2010		《冰是睡着的水》	Teacher	
2010		《金沙》	Princess Chan'gu	
2011	Legend of Chu Liuxiang	《楚留香新传》	Ai Qing	
2012	Qiangzi's Happiness	《强子的幸福》		
2012	Uniform Woman	《戎装女人》	Ming Ke'ning	
2012	The Story of Xiang Mountain	《香山奇缘》	Princess Wu	
2012	Romance of Tang Kongfu	《唐朝浪漫英雄》	Li Huawu	
2012	Legend of Lu Zhen	《陆贞传奇》		

=== Albums ===
Release date	English Title	Chinese Title
2006	As long as you happy	《只要你快乐》

== Awards ==
Year	Work	Award	Result	Notes
1999	Through Taoyuan	17th China Golden Eagle Awards- Best Supporting Actress	Nominated	
2010	Brother's Happiness	Huading Award for Favorite Actress	Won	
