= Prince Li (理) =

Prince Li of the First Rank

Chinese name
- Traditional Chinese: 和碩理親王
- Simplified Chinese: 和硕理亲王
Transcriptions
Standard Mandarin
- Hanyu Pinyin: héshuò lǐ qīnwáng
- Wade–Giles: ho-shuo li ch'in-wang

Manchu name
- Manchu script: ᡥᠣᡧᠣᡳ ᡤᡳᠶᠠᠩᡤᠠ ᠴᡳᠨ ᠸᠠᠩ
- Romanization: hošoi giyangga cin wang

Prince Li of the First Rank, or simply Prince Li, was the title of a princely peerage used in China during the Manchu-led Qing dynasty (1644–1912). As the Prince Li peerage was not awarded "iron-cap" status, this meant that each successive bearer of the title would normally start off with a title downgraded by one rank vis-à-vis that held by his predecessor. However, the title would generally not be downgraded to any lower than a feng'en fuguo gong except under special circumstances.

The first bearer of the title was Yunreng (1674–1725), the Kangxi Emperor's second son and former heir apparent for two terms between 1675 and 1712. After Yunreng died, he was posthumously honoured with the title "Prince Li of the First Rank" by his fourth brother, the Yongzheng Emperor, who succeeded their father. The title was passed down over eight generations and held by ten persons.

== Members of the Prince Li peerage ==
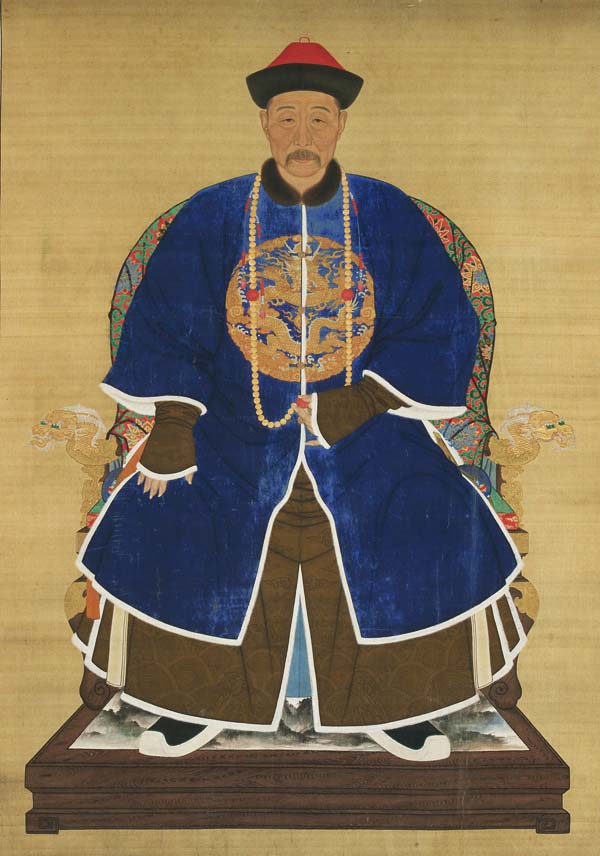
Yunreng (1674–1725), the first Prince Li

- Yunreng (1674–1725), the Kangxi Emperor's second son, posthumously honoured as Prince Limi of the First Rank (理密親王) in 1724
  - Hongxi (弘晳; 1694–1742), Yunreng's second son, held the title Prince Li of the Second Rank from 1723 to 1728, promoted to Prince Li of the First Rank in 1728, stripped of his title in 1739
  - Hongwei (弘㬙; 1719–1780), Yunreng's tenth son, held the title of a feng'en fuguo gong from 1736 to 1739, promoted to Prince Li of the Second Rank in 1739, posthumously honoured as Prince Like of the Second Rank (理恪郡王)
    - Yong'ai (永曖; 1742–1789), Hongwei's eldest son, held the title of a third class fuguo jiangjun from 1770 to 1780, promoted to beile in 1780
      - Mianpu (綿溥; 1767–1801), Yong'ai's second son, held the title of a beizi from 1789 to 1801
        - Yihao (奕灝; 1784–1844), Mianpu's eldest son, held the title of a feng'en zhenguo gong from 1801 to 1830, stripped of his title in 1830, restored as a feng'en fuguo gong in 1838, stripped of his title again within the same year
          - Zaikuan (載寬; 1813–1838), Yihao's third son, held the title of a feng'en fuguo gong from 1830 to 1838
          - Zaishou (載受), Yihao's eldest son, held the title of a fuguo jiangjun from 1831 to 1848
            - Fucun (福存), Zaishou's second son, held the title of a fengguo jiangjun from 1849 to 1888
              - Yujun (毓均), Fucun's eldest son, held the title of a fengguo jiangjun from 1889 to 1909, had no male heir
        - Yikui (奕魁), Mianpu's second son, held the title of a third class zhenguo jiangjun from 1809 to 1818
          - Zaixiu (載鏽), Yikui's eldest son, held the title of a fuguo jiangjun from 1818 to 1827, had no male heir
    - Yongyu (永育), Hongwei's second son, held the title of a third class fengguo jiangjun from 1775 to 1794
      - Mianyun (綿澐), Yongyu's third son, held the title of a feng'en jiangjun from 1795 to 1858
        - Yitang (奕堂), Mianyun's third son, held the title of a feng'en jiangjun from 1858 to 1888
          - Zaiyu (載鈺), Yitang's second son, held the title of a feng'en jiangjun in 1888
    - Yongzhun (永準), Hongwei's fifth son, held the title of a first class fuguo jiangjun from 1790 to 1817, had no male heir
  - Hongjin (弘晉; 1696–1717), Yunreng's third son, posthumously honoured as a feng'en fuguo gong in 1717
    - Yongjing (永璥), Hongjin's third son, held the title of a feng'en fuguo gong from 1736 to 1787
  - Hongyan (弘曣; 1712–1750), Yunreng's sixth son, held the title of a feng'en fuguo gong from 1728 to 1750, posthumously honoured as Feng'en Fuguo Kexi Gong (奉恩輔國恪僖公)
    - Yongwei (永瑋; 1731–1788), Hongyan's eldest son, held the title of a feng'en fuguo gong from 1750 to 1787, posthumously honoured as Feng'en Fuguo Keqin Gong (奉恩輔國恪勤公)
      - Mianzuo (綿佐), Yongwei's fifth son, held the title of a feng'en fuguo gong from 1788 to 1806
        - Yizhi (奕質), Mianzuo's eldest son, held the title of a buru bafen fuguo gong from 1807 to 1817
        - Yizan (奕贊), Mianzuo's third son, held the title of a feng'en jiangjun from 1812 to 1869, had no male heir
      - Mianjun (綿俊), Yongwei's eldest son, held the title of a third class fengguo jiangjun from 1770 to 1790
        - Yize (奕澤), Mianjun's eldest son, held the title of a feng'en jiangjun from 1790 to 1848
          - Zaipu (載普), Yize's third son, held the title of a feng'en jiangjun from 1849 to 1885
            - Purong (溥榮), Zaipu's son
              - Yukuan (毓寬), Purong's second son, held the title of a feng'en jiangjun from 1885
      - Miankan (綿侃), Yongwei's second son, held the title of a feng'en jiangjun from 1770 to 1797, had no male heir
  - Hongtiao (弘晀; 1714–1774), Yunreng's seventh son, held the title of a feng'en fuguo gong from 1734 to 1769, stripped of his title in 1769
    - Yongzeng (永增), Hongtiao's eldest son, held the title of a feng'en jiangjun from 1757 to 1779
      - Miandie (綿瓞), Yongzeng's second son, held the title of a feng'en jiangjun from 1780 to 1802, stripped of his title in 1802
    - Yongdeng (永璒; 1740–1770), Hongtiao's fourth son, held the title of a third class fengguo jiangjun from 1761 to 1770
      - Mianbo (綿瓝; 1759–1832), Yongdeng's eldest son, held the title of a feng'en jiangjun from 1771 to 1832
        - Yizhi (奕芝; 1779–1814), Mianbo's son
          - Zaidai (載岱; 1802–1874), Yizhi's eldest son, succeeded Zaikuan in 1839, held the title of a feng'en fuguo gong from 1839 to 1874
            - Pufeng (溥豐; 1829–1896), Zaidai's eldest son, held the title of a second class fuguo jiangjun from 1850 to 1875, promoted to feng'en fuguo gong in 1875
              - Yuzhao (毓炤; 1883–?), Pufeng's fourth son, held the title of a feng'en fuguo gong from 1896
            - Pusheng (溥盛), Zaidai's second son, held the title of a second class fuguo jiangjun from 1821 to 1891
              - Yuyou (毓佑), Pusheng's third son, held the title of a fengguo jiangjun from 1891 to 1923
            - Puzheng (溥徵), Zaidai's third son, held the title of a fuguo jiangjun from 1857 to 1889
              - Yushang (毓鏛), Puzheng's eldest son, held the title of a fengguo jiangjun from 1889
            - Purui (溥銳), Zaidai's sixth son, held the title of a first class fengguo jiangjun from 1886 to 1895, had no male heir
    - Yongmin (永砇), Hongtiao's fifth son, held the title of a second class fengguo jiangjun from 1761 to 1764
      - Mianbeng (綿𤫬), Yongmin's second son, held the title of a feng'en jiangjun from 1764 to 1811
        - Yijin (奕錦), Mianbeng's third son, held the title of a feng'en jiangjun from 1816 to 1851
          - Zaiji (載績), Yijin's eldest son, held the title of a feng'en jiangjun from 1851 to 1861, stripped of his title in 1861
    - Yongxia (永遐), Hongtiao's seventh son, held the title of a second class fengguo jiangjun from 1761 to 1821
      - Mianlie (綿烈), Yongxia's eldest son, held the title of a feng'en jiangjun from 1784 to 1816
        - Yidan (奕亶), Mianlie's second son, held the title of a feng'en jiangjun from 1817 to 1842, had no male heir
  - Hongwan (弘晥; 1724–1775), Yunreng's 12th son, held the title of a feng'en fuguo gong from 1738 to 1775
    - Yonghao (永浩), Hongwan's second son, held the title of a buru bafen fuguo gong from 1775 to 1778

== Family tree ==
Yunreng 允礽 (1674–1725); Prince Limi of the First Rank 理密親王 (posthumously awarded)
Hongxi 弘晳 (1694–1742); Prince Li of the First Rank 理親王 (1728–1739) (stripped of his title) | Hongtiao 弘晀 (1714–1774); Feng'en Fuguo Gong 奉恩輔國公 (1734–1769) (stripped of his title) | Hongwei 弘㬙 (1719–1780); Prince Like of the Second Rank 理恪郡王 (1739–1780)
Yongdeng 永璒 (1740–1770); Third Class Fengguo Jiangjun 三等奉國將軍 (1761–1770) | Yong'ai 永曖 (1742–1789); Beile 貝勒 (1780–1789)
Mianbo 綿瓝 (1759–1832); Feng'en Jiangjun 奉恩將軍 (1771–1832) | Mianpu 綿溥 (1767–1801); Beizi 貝子 (1789–1801)
Yizhi 奕芝 (1779–1814) | Yihao 奕灝 (1784–1844); Feng'en Zhenguo Gong / Feng'en Fuguo Gong 奉恩鎮國公 / 奉恩輔國公 (1801–1830 / 1838)
Zaidai 載岱 (1802–1874); Feng'en Fuguo Gong 奉恩輔國公 (1839–1874) | Zaikuan 載寬 (1813–1838); Feng'en Fuguo Gong 奉恩輔國公 (1830–1838)
Pufeng 溥豐 (1829–1896); Feng'en Fuguo Gong 奉恩輔國公 (1875–1896)
Yuzhao 毓炤 (1883–?); Feng'en Fuguo Gong 奉恩輔國公 (1896–?)

== See also ==
- Royal and noble ranks of the Qing dynasty
