= Songgotu =

Qing dynasty statesman

Deliberative Minister
- In office 1680–1683

Grand Secretary of the Baohe Hall
- In office 1670–1680

Personal details
- Born: 1636
- Died: 1703 (aged 66–67)
- Parent: Sonin (father)

Songgotu (Manchu:; simplified Chinese: 索额图; traditional Chinese: 索額圖; pinyin: Suǒ'étú; 1636 – 1703) was a minister during the reign of the Kangxi Emperor of the Qing dynasty. He was an uncle of the emperor's primary spouse, Empress Xiaochengren of the Hešeri clan, who died during childbirth. He was also the son of Sonin, one of the four regents appointed to assist the young Kangxi Emperor during his minority. As Empress Xiaochengren's paternal uncle, he was also therefore, the grand-uncle of Yinreng, who was crown prince throughout most of the Kangxi Emperor's reign. Songgotu did not inherit the noble title First-class Duke or First-class Earl from his father Sonin because his mother was not the primary consort, therefore, he had the lowest status of his brothers. His sixth brother and fifth brother inherited the noble titles First-class Duke and First-class Count. His oldest brother, Gabula, was Empress Xiaochengren's father, and he also had the noble title First-class Duke.

Songgotu helped the young Kangxi Emperor depose Oboi, a regent during the reign of the young emperor. Gradually, Songgotu gained more power and became one of the most prominent officials under Kangxi. He was involved in a long power struggle with Mingju, another official at Kangxi's court. He also acted as a diplomat and signed the Treaty of Nerchinsk with Russia.

During Kangxi's expedition against Dzungar khan Galdan, Songgotu advocated for a withdrawal, but was reprimanded by the emperor for suggesting such a strategy. Songgotu was later implicated in the heir-apparent crisis, and he was imprisoned until death. Kangxi rescinded recognition for all of Songgotu's achievements during the latter's life, with the sole exception of the Treaty with Russia.

== In fiction ==
- The Deer and the Cauldron (鹿鼎記), a wuxia novel by Louis Cha. In the story, Songgotu was an aristocrat who befriended the protagonist Wei Xiaobao.
