= Yunreng =

Qing Dynasty prince (1674–1725)

- Crown Prince
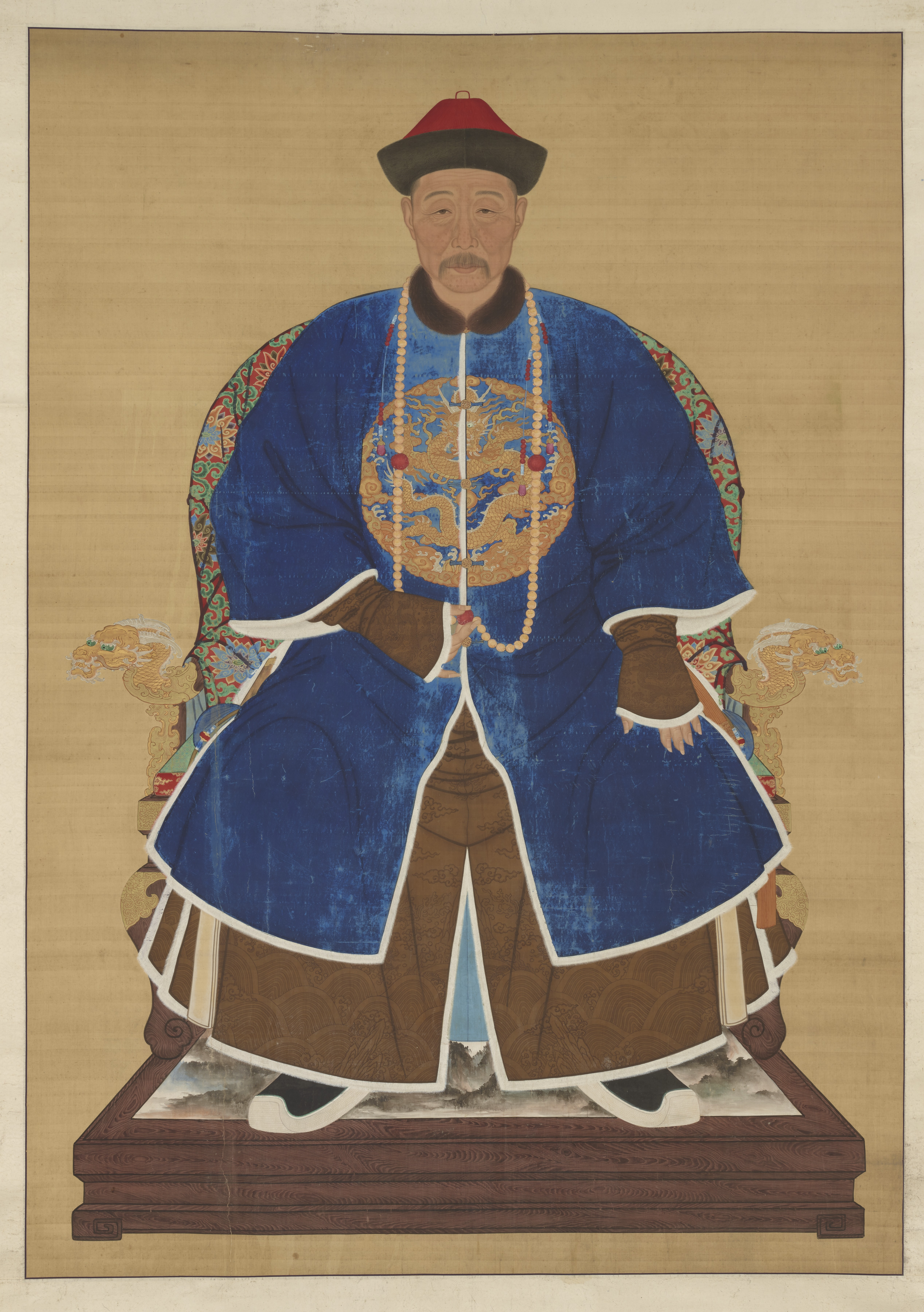
- Portrait of Yunreng

Crown Prince of the Qing dynasty
- Tenure: 3 January 1676 – 30 September 1708 (First term); 17 April 1709 – 24 November 1712 (Second term)
- Born: Aisin Gioro Baocheng (愛新覺羅·保成); 6 June 1674; Beijing, China
- Died: 27 January 1725 (aged 50); Beijing, China
- Consorts: Lady Gūwalgiya (m. 1695; died 1718)
- Issue: Hongxi, Prince Li of the First Rank; Hongjin; Hongyan; Hongtiao; Hongyao; Hongwei, Prince Li of the Second Rank; Hongbing; Hongwan; Princess of the Third Rank; Princess Shushen of the Second Rank; Princess of the Third Rank; Princess of the Fourth Rank; Princess of the Third Rank
Names
- Aisin Gioro Yunreng (愛新覺羅·允礽)
Posthumous name
- Prince Limi of the First Rank (理密親王)
- House: Aisin Gioro
- Father: Kangxi Emperor
- Mother: Empress Xiaochengren

Yunreng
- Chinese: 允礽
Transcriptions
Standard Mandarin
- Hanyu Pinyin: Yǔnréng

Yinreng
- Chinese: 胤礽
Transcriptions
Standard Mandarin
- Hanyu Pinyin: Yìnréng

Yunreng (6 June 1674 – 27 January 1725), born Yinreng, was a Manchu prince of the Qing dynasty. He was the second among the Kangxi Emperor's sons to survive into adulthood and was designated as Crown Prince for two terms between 1676 and 1712 before being deposed. He was posthumously honoured as Prince Limi of the First Rank.

== Biography ==
Yunreng was born of the Manchu Aisin Gioro clan as the seventh son of the Kangxi Emperor, but was the second among the emperor's sons to survive into adulthood. He was given the infant name "Baocheng" (保成), and was renamed "Yinreng" when he became older. His mother was the Kangxi Emperor's first empress, Empress Xiaochengren from the Hešeri clan, who was also a granddaughter of Sonin (one of the four regents in the Kangxi Emperor's early reign). She died not long after giving birth to Yinreng, and was greatly lamented by the Kangxi Emperor.

The Kangxi Emperor personally taught Yinreng to read and he proclaimed Yinreng as his Crown Prince when Yinreng was only a year old. Under the tutelage of several scholar-officials, Yinreng became well-versed in the Chinese and Manchu languages. Between 1696 and 1697, when the Kangxi Emperor was away twice on military campaigns against Galdan Khan of the Zunghar Khanate, Yinreng was appointed as regent to supervise affairs in the imperial capital, Beijing. Despite scandals and accusations of immorality, Yinreng remained in his father's favour and was given the Western Gardens (西花園) of Beijing as his residence.

In 1703, Yinreng's granduncle Songgotu was found guilty of attempting to murder the Kangxi Emperor, along with a series of corruption charges, and was imprisoned and died shortly afterwards. Yinreng gradually fell out of his father's favour as a result. In 1708, during a hunting expedition in Rehe, the Kangxi Emperor accused Yinreng of immorality, sexual impropriety, usurping power, and treason. Yinreng was stripped of his position as Crown Prince and imprisoned. When it was later discovered that the First Prince Yinzhi had employed lamas to cast evil spells on Yinreng, the Kangxi Emperor pardoned Yinreng in 1709 and restored him as Crown Prince. In the following three years, Yinreng's condition deteriorated and the Kangxi Emperor became convinced that Yinreng was insane. Consequently, in 1712, Yinreng was deposed again and placed in perpetual confinement.

In 1722, the Kangxi Emperor died and was succeeded by his fourth son Yinzhen, who became historically known as the Yongzheng Emperor. Yinreng changed his name to Yunreng to avoid naming taboo because the Chinese character for "Yin" (胤) in "Yinreng" is the same as the one in the Yongzheng Emperor's personal name "Yinzhen" (胤禛). Yunreng died three years later in 1725 while still being incarcerated. He was granted the posthumous title of "Prince Limi of the First Rank" (和碩理密親王).

The bitter factionalism between the Kangxi Emperor's sons and the dispute over the succession prompted the Yongzheng Emperor to establish a practice of writing a secret imperial edict on who would succeed to the throne, and sealing the edict in a box behind a tablet in the Palace of Heavenly Purity in the Forbidden City. The edict would only be publicly revealed upon the death of the reigning emperor.

== Family ==
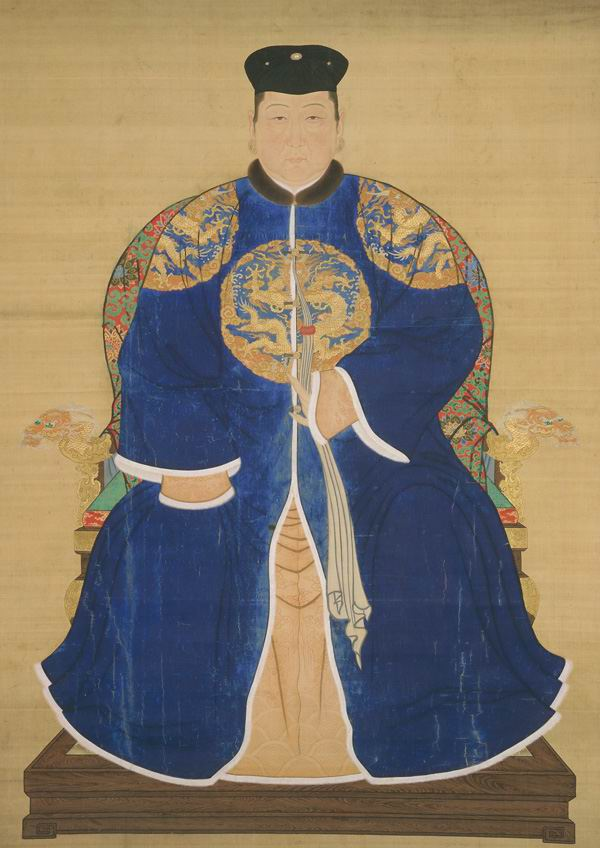
Lady Guwalgiya, primary consort of Yinreng

Primary Consort

- Imperial Princess Consort Limi, of the Gūwalgiya clan (和碩亲王福晋 瓜爾佳氏; d. July/August 1718)
  Titles: Crown Princess (皇太子妃), Primary Consort to the Seventh Prince (七王子嫡福晋), Imperial Princess Consort Limi of the First Rank (和碩亲王福晋)
  - Princess of the Third Rank (郡主; 25 September 1697 – 5 May 1735), 3rd daughter
    - Married Alabutan (阿喇布坦) of the Tumed in June/July 1720

Secondary Consort

- Secondary Consort, of the Ligiya clan (側福晉 李佳氏)
  Titles: Secondary Consort of the Crown Prince (皇太子侧妃), Secondary Consort of the Seventh Prince (七王子侧妃), Secondary Consort to Prince Limi of the First Rank (和碩亲王侧妃)
  - First son (4 February 1692 – 27 December 1701)
  - First daughter (27 May 1693 – June/July 1693)
  - Second daughter (11 March 1694 – March/April 1694)
  - Hongxi, Prince Li of the First Rank (理親王 弘晳; 25 August 1694 – 26 October 1742), 2nd son
- Secondary consort, of the Lingiya clan (側福晉 林佳氏)
  Titles: Secondary Consort of the Crown Prince (皇太子侧妃), Secondary Consort of the Seventh Prince (七王子侧妃), Secondary Consort to Prince Limi of the First Rank (和碩亲王侧妃)
  - Hongjin, Duke of the Second Rank (輔國公 弘晉; 14 November 1696 – 23 April 1717), 3rd son
  - Princess of the Fourth Rank (縣主; 10 January 1715 – 12 July 1762), 9th daughter
    - Married Cewangduo'erji (策旺多爾濟; d. 1751) of the Aohan in January/February 1730
- Secondary consort, of the Tanggiya clan (側福晉 唐佳氏)
  Titles: Secondary Consort of the Crown Prince (皇太子侧妃), Secondary Consort of the Seventh Prince (七王子侧妃), Secondary Consort to Prince Limi of the First Rank (和碩亲王侧妃)
  - Fourth son (1 November 1704 – 4 February 1706)
  - Princess Shushen of the Second Rank (和碩淑慎公主; 24 January 1708 – 23 October 1784), 6th daughter
    - Married Janggimboo (觀音保; d. 1735) of the Khorchin Borjigit clan in December 1726 or January 1727
  - Hongyan, Duke Kexi of the Second Rank (輔國恪僖公 弘曣; 5 August 1712 – 19 May 1750), 6th son
- Secondary consort, of the Cenggiya clan (側福晉 程佳氏)
  Titles: Secondary Consort of the Seventh Prince (七王子侧妃), Secondary Consort to Prince Limi of the First Rank (和碩亲王侧妃)
  - Princess of the Third Rank (郡主; 2 March 1714 – 21 November 1760), 8th daughter
    - Married Pengsukelashi (彭蘇克拉氏) of the Aohan Borjigit clan in January/February 1731
  - Tenth daughter (27 July 1717 – February/March 1720)
  - Hongwei, Prince Like of the Second Rank (理恪郡王 弘㬙; 27 January 1719 – 25 September 1780), 10th son
  - Hongwan, Duke of the Second Rank (輔國公 弘晥; 6 November 1724 – 29 May 1775), 12th son
- Secondary consort, of the Wanyan clan (側福晉 完颜氏)
  Titles: Secondary Consort of the Seventh Prince (七王子侧妃), Secondary Consort to Prince Limi of the First Rank (和碩亲王侧妃)
  - Hongtiao, Duke of the Second Rank (輔國公 弘晀; 16 June 1714 – 28 August 1774), 7th son
  - Hongbing (弘昞; 8 February 1720 – 4 May 1763), 11th son

Concubine

- Concubine, of the Fangiya clan (范佳氏)
  Titles: Crown Prince's Concubine (皇太子庶妃), Seventh Prince's Concubine (七王子庶福晋), Concubine to Prince Limi of the First Rank (和碩親王庶福晋)
  - Fourth daughter (16 March 1706)
  - Fifth daughter (4 January 1708 – February/March 1712)
- Concubine, of the Liu clan (劉氏)
  Titles: Crown Prince's Concubine (皇太子庶妃), Seventh Prince's Concubine (七王子庶福晋), Concubine to Prince Limi of the First Rank (和碩親王庶福晋)
  - Fifth son (16 December 1708)
- Concubine, of the Liugiya clan (劉佳氏)
  Titles: Crown Prince's Concubine (皇太子庶妃), Seventh Prince's Concubine (七王子庶福晋), Concubine to Prince Limi of the First Rank (和碩親王庶福晋)
  - Seventh daughter (25 November 1711 – November/December 1716)
  - 11th daughter (27 July 1717 – 29 March 1725)
- Concubine, of the Qian clan (錢氏)
  Titles: Seventh Prince's Concubine (七王子庶福晋), Concubine to Prince Limi of the First Rank (和碩親王庶福晋)
  - Eighth son (1 March 1715 – 4 July 1726)
- Concubine, of the Qiu clan (邱氏)
  Titles: Seventh Prince's Concubine (七王子庶福晋), Concubine to Prince Limi of the First Rank (和碩親王庶福晋)
  - Hongyao (弘暚; 3 July 1716 – 9 February 1783), 9th son
- Concubine, of the Qi clan (祁氏)
  Titles: Seventh Prince's Concubine (七王子庶福晋), Concubine to Prince Limi of the First Rank (和碩親王庶福晋)
  - Princess of the Third Rank (郡主; 14 November 1717 – 30 April 1776), 12th daughter
    - Married Kaying'a (喀英阿) of the Kharchin in January/February 1732
- Concubine, of the Zhu clan (朱氏)
  Titles: Seventh Prince's Concubine (七王子庶福晋), Concubine to Prince Limi of the First Rank (和碩親王庶福晋)
  - 13th daughter (4 February 1718 – May/June 1719)
- Concubine, of the Pei clan (裴氏)
  Titles: Seventh Prince's Concubine (七王子庶福晋), Concubine to Prince Limi of the First Rank (和碩親王庶福晋)
  - 14th daughter (25 April 1722 – August/September 1722)

== In fiction and popular culture ==
- Portrayed by Xu Min in Yongzheng Dynasty (1999)
- Portrayed by Zong Fengyan in Palace (2011)
- Portrayed by Zhang Lei in Scarlet Heart (2011)
- Portrayed by Lam Chi-chung in The Palace (2013)
- Portrayed by Power Chan in Gilded Chopsticks (2014)
- Portrayed by Liao Yan Long in Love In The Imperial Palace (2017)
- Portrayed by Ni Song Yang in Dreaming Back To Qing Dynasty (2019)

== See also ==
- Prince Li (理)
- Royal and noble ranks of the Qing dynasty
- Ranks of imperial consorts in China#Qing
- Mongolian nobility#Qing period and Boghda Khaan Mongolia
