= Hešeri =

Manchu clan and family name

Manchu name
- Manchu script: ᡥᡝᡧᡝᡵᡳ

Chinese name
- Chinese: 赫舍里氏 纥石烈氏
Transcriptions
Standard Mandarin
- Hanyu Pinyin: hè shè lǐ shì hé shí liè shì

Pronunciation respelling name
- Pronunciation respelling: HƏ-Shə-Ree

Hešeri, a major Manchu clans and surname, is one of the Eight Great Manchu Surnames listed in the General Genealogy of the Eight Banners Manchu Clans (八旗滿洲氏族通譜).

== Overview ==
The clan can be traced back to the Heshilie (紇石烈) clan in Chinese of the Jurchen Jin dynasty, itself descended from one of the Thirty Common Surnames of Jurchen (女真通用三十姓) recorded in the late Tang dynasty. The name originally derived from a river. Its earliest reliably documented ancestor was Muhulu Dudū, whose descendants settled in Duyengge, Baihe, and Hada. During the rise of the Later Jin, different branches of the clan, residing in places such as Duyengge and other places across Southern Manchuria, gradually joined Nurhaci's uprising.

During the Qing dynasty, the most distinguished branch was the Plain Yellow Banner Hešeri clan of Duyengge, descended from Šose Baksi (碩色巴克什) and Hife (希福). Its members included the regent Sonin, Grand Secretary Songgotu, ministers Suwayamboo (帥顏保) and Hei (赫奕), and Empress Xiaochengren. Other prominent branches produced officials and military commanders such as Baindari, Erdeni, and Songju (嵩祝). Following the fall of the Qing dynasty, descendants of the Hešeri clan generally adopted the Sino surnames He (赫/何), while others used surnames including Gao (高), Kang (康), Zhang (张), Lu (芦), He (贺), Suo (索), Ying (英), Hao (郝), Hei (黑), Pu (普), Li (李), or Man (满).

== Gallery ==
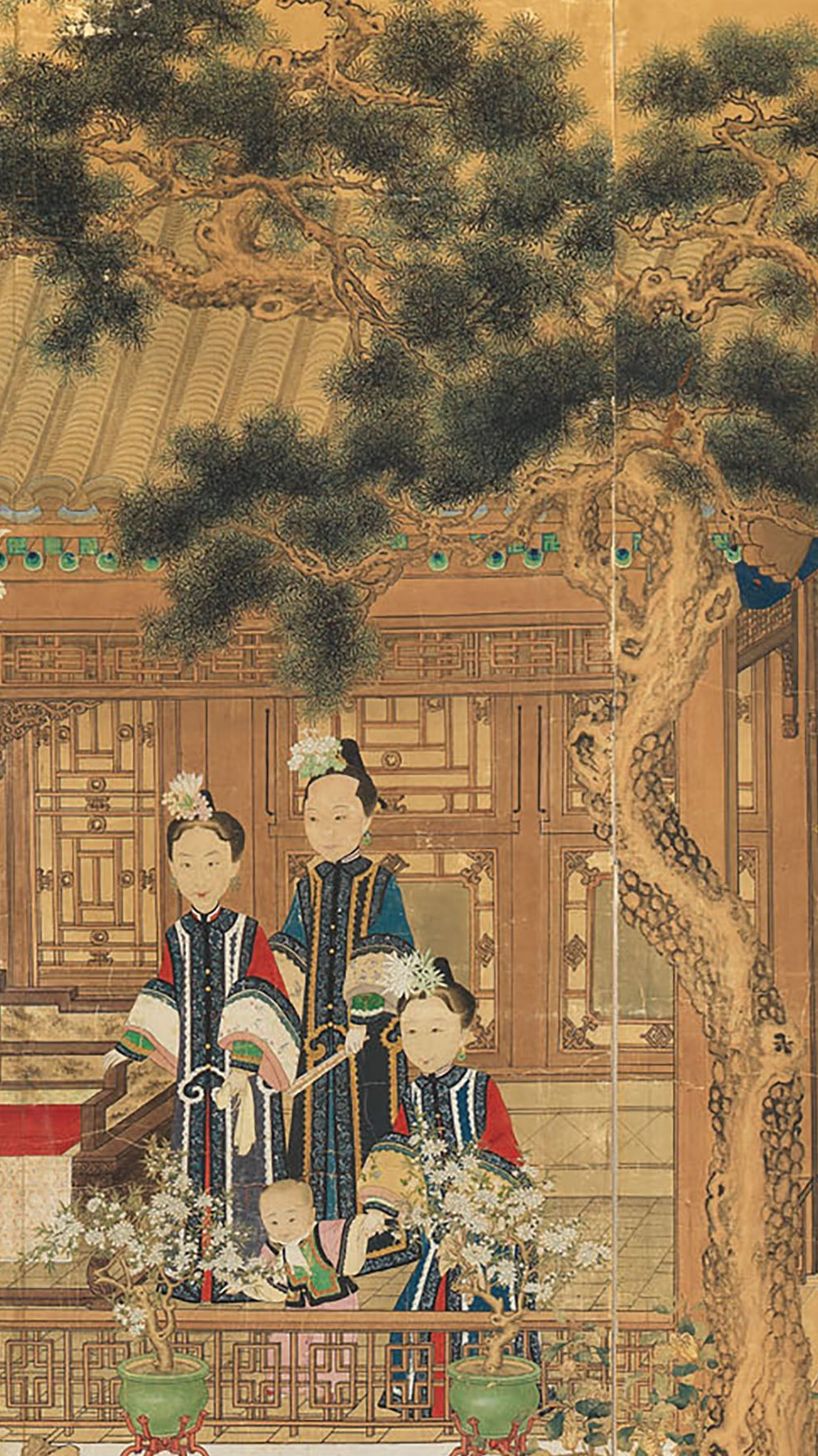
Consort Chang in daily dress ("Imperial Court in 1844" by He Shikui)

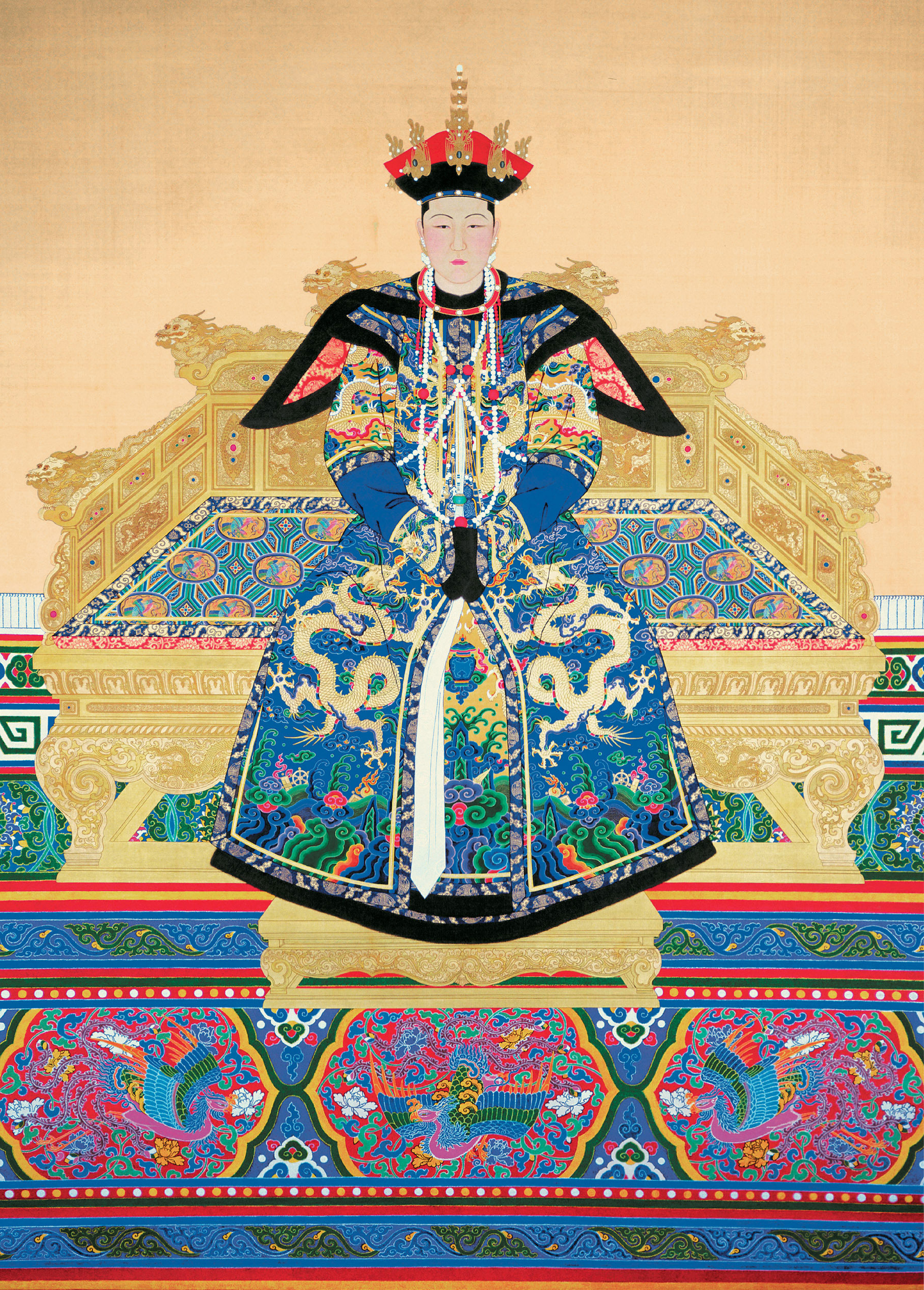
Empress Xiaochengren

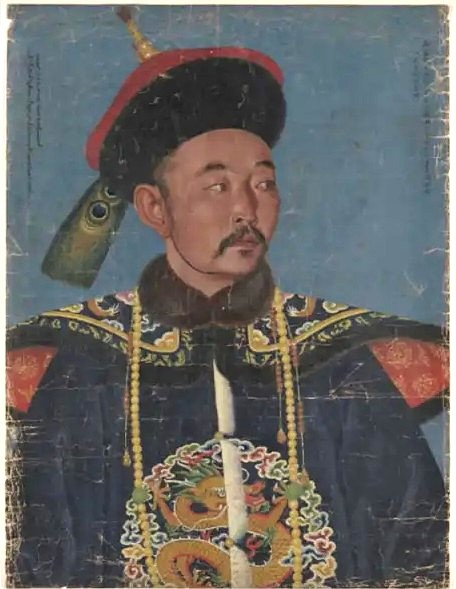
Jalafungga, a senior military minister and Baron in Qianlong period, died in the Sino-Burmese War(1768).

== See also ==
- List of Manchu clans
