= Luokeduo =

- Prince Ping of the Second Rank 多羅平郡王

Head of the House of Prince Keqin peerage
- Predecessor: Lolohun
- Successor: Nertu
- Born: 10 August 1640
- Died: 14 August 1682 (aged 42)
- Spouse: Lady Khorchin Borjigin
- Issue: Nertu; Nerfu
Posthumous name
- Prince Pingbi of the Second Rank (平比郡王)
- House: Aisin Gioro
- Father: Lolohun
- Mother: Lady Tunggiya

Luokeduo (羅科鐸, 10 August 1640 – 14 August 1682) was Qing dynasty imperial prince as the first son of Lolohun, grandson of Yoto and great grandson of Prince Lilie of the First Rank Daišan. Upon his inheritance, the Prince Yanxi of the Second Rank peerage was renamed to Prince Ping of the Second Rank. The peerage was renamed back to Prince Keqin in 1778 in commemoration of Yoto's contribution to the establishment of Qing dynasty.

== Life ==
Luokeduo was born on 10 August 1640 to lady Tunggiya, Primary Princess Consort Yanxijie of the Second Rank. Luokeduo had two younger brothers, prematurely deceased Bahata and Prince of the Third Rank Nuoni. On 11 September 1646, Luokeduo's father Lolohun died in battlefield, therefore Luokeduo inherited the princely title. In 1651, the title Luokeduo held was changed to "Prince Ping of the Second Rank" (多罗平郡王).

=== Military and political career ===
In 1658, Luokeduo followed Prince Xin of the Second Rank Duoni in suppression of the remnants of the Ming dynasty also known as Southern Ming Dynasty, including Prince of Gui Zhu Youlang who had earlier proclaimed himself as the emperor. Zhu Youlang was retreating from Yunnan to Myanma so as to seek refuge from Burmese Taungoo dynasty, which led to a war between Southern Ming and Myanma. Luokeduo played his role in elimination of Prince of Jin Li Dingguo and Prince Gong of Chang Bai Wenxuan, the military protectors of the forlorn Yongli Emperor. In 1659, Luokeduo was awarded with dragon robe, bow, sword and horse reins for his merits during the transition from Ming to Qing. Both Zhu Youlang and Li Dingguo were strangled by Wu Sangui.

=== Death and succession ===
Luokeduo died on 14 August 1682 and was posthumously honoured as "Prince Pingbi of the Second Rank" (多罗平比郡王, meaning "peaceful and collaborative"). He was succeeded by the fourth son, Na'ertu.

== Family ==
Luokeduo was married to lady Borjigit, a daughter of Darhan Zhuoliketu Badun Taiji (达尔罕卓里克图巴敦台吉). His grandson, Na'ersu, was closely related to the Cao family by marriage with Cao Xueqin's aunt.

Consorts and issue:

- Primary consort, of the Khorchin Borjigin clan (嫡福晋科尔沁博尔济吉特氏)
  - Luoming (洛明; 1661-1664), first son
  - Prince Ping of the Second Rank Na'ertu (多罗平郡王讷尔图; 17 June 1665-9 June 1696), fourth son
  - E'ertu (额尔图;1666-1673), fifth son
  - Prince Pingdao of the Second Rank Na'erfu (多罗平悼郡王讷尔福; 9 September 1678-15 August 1701), sixth son
- Mistress, lady Hu (妾胡氏)
- Mistress, of the Gongjilate clan (公吉拉特氏)
  - Hurha (祜尔哈;1662-1663), second son
  - Zhangfu (章福; 1665-1668), third son
