= Yunduan =

- Prince Qin of the Second Rank 多羅勤郡王

Head of the House of Prince Qin peerage
- Tenure: 1636–1652
- Predecessor: peerage created
- Successor: peerage abolished
- Born: 1671
- Died: 1705 (aged 33–34)
- House: Aisin Gioro
- Father: Yolo
- Mother: Lady Hešeri

Yunduan (Chinese: 蘊端, 1671-1705) was Qing dynasty imperial prince as Yolo's 18th son and Abatai's grandson. Yunduan was granted a title of Prince Qin of the Second Rank in 1684 and was stripped of all of his titles in 1698. His lineage became extinct because of the lack of a male heir. As Prince Qin of the Second Rank peerage was not given iron-cap status, each successive bearer of the title would hold diminished ranks vis-a-vis his predecessor.

== Life ==
Yunduan was born in 1671 to lady Hešeri, Yolo's third primary consort and paternal aunt of Empress Xiaochengren, Kangxi Emperor's first reigning empress. Yunduan was granted a title 'Prince Qin of the Second Rank' (勤郡王, meaning "diligent") in 1684. In 1690, after Nuoni (member of Prince Keqin peerage ) discovered that Yolo had sown discord among the regents and princes and, moreover, had framed Nuoni for unwilling to demonstrate filial piety, Yunduan was downgraded to prince of the fourth rank (贝子) along with his father, who became posthumously demoted to Prince An of the Second Rank，and brother, who became demoted to grace defender duke without an ability to pass the title on his descendants. Yunduan was stripped of his titles in 1698 because of his sympathy for Han rebelliants. It was disputed that Yunduan was not granted red girdles due to Kangxi Emperor's admiration for his literary works.

Yunduan died in 1705 at the age of 35. After his death, there weren't any other imperial princes adopted as his successors, hence the peerage remained extinct.

In his childhood, Yunduan was raised together with his elder brother, but turned ill-tempered because of their jealousy. Yunduan was recognised as an artist and a poet, whose lyrics evolved into Chinese opera. His works include: "Bridge on the Jade Basin" (《玉池生稿》), "Stories of Red Orchids" (《红兰集》), "Smartweed in the Sand" (《蓼汀集》), "Untitled poem" (《无题诗》); which became a libretto of "Story of the Dream of Yangzhou" (《扬州梦传奇》) and "View of the Late Spring" (《春郊晚眺》).

== Family ==
Yunduan was married to lady Nara, daughter of Cha'erhai (查尔海). His second wife was the sister of his previous one.

- Primary consort of the Nara clan (那拉氏)
  - Jinglian (经廉;1697-1699)
- Second primary consort, of the Nara clan (那拉氏)

=== Family tree ===
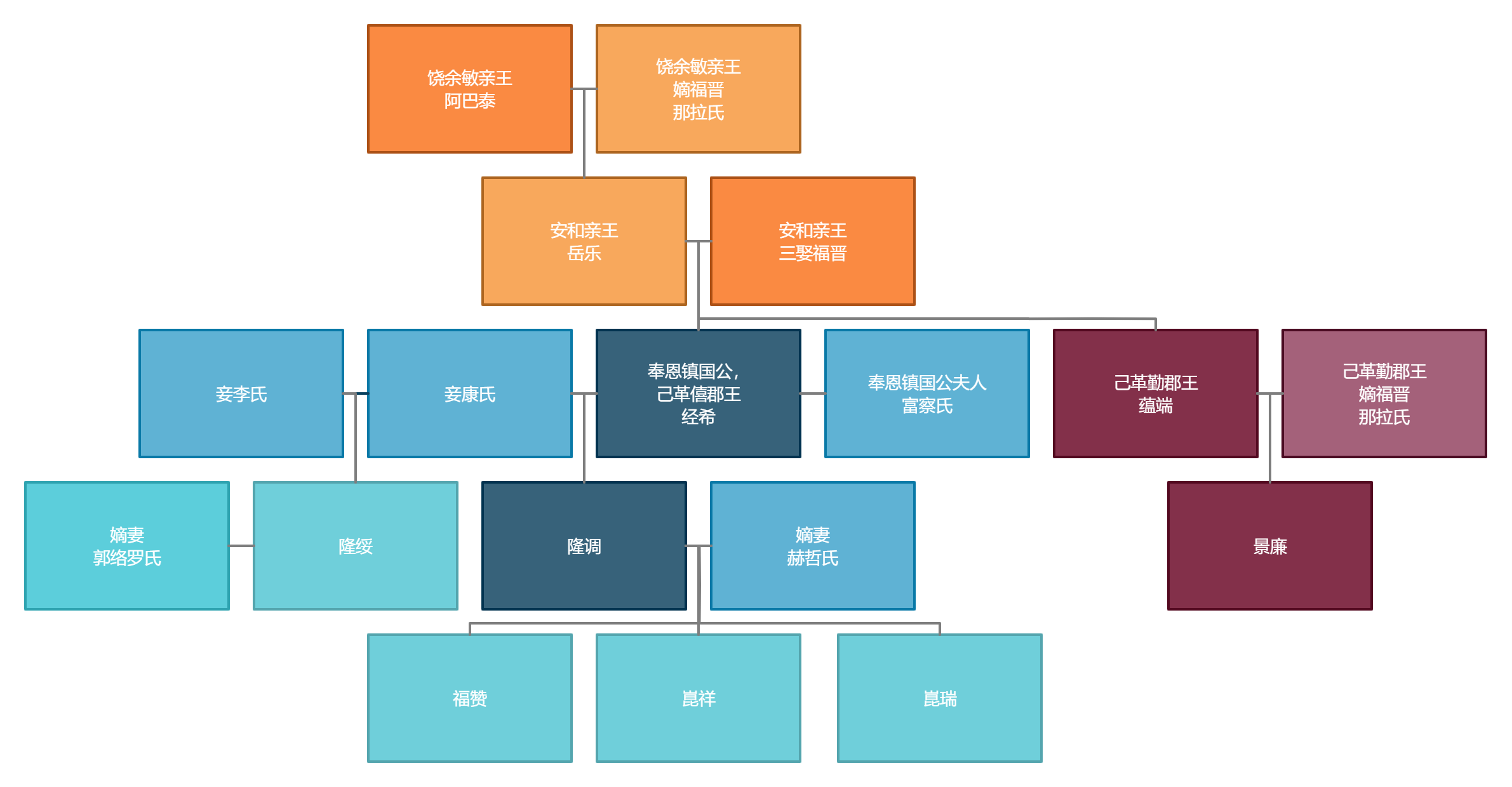
Compound family tree of the Prince Xi and Prince Qin peerage

Legend:

Orange - Prince Raoyu/Prince An of the First Rank

Indigo - Prince Xi

Blue - Consorts of Prince Xi

Light Blue - Lesser members and their consorts

Purple - Prince Qin

Violet - Consorts of Prince Xi

== Names ==
First courtesy name: Jianshan (兼山)

Second courtesy name: Zhengzi (正子), meaning "upright son"

First art name: Yuchisheng (玉池生), derived from the homonymic poem, meaning : "Scholar of the Jade Pond"

Second art name: Master of the Room of Red Orchids (红兰室主人), derived from the poem "Stories of Red Orchids"
