= Nuoni =

Prince in Qing dynasty

- Beile
- Born: 4 February 1643
- Died: 9 February 1701 (aged 58)
- House: Aisin Gioro
- Father: Lolohun

Nuoni (諾尼, 4 February 1643 - 9 February 1701) was Qing dynasty imperial prince as the third son of Lolohun, a grandson of Yoto and Daišan's great grandson. Though being a relatively unremarkable clansman, Nuoni led to the posthumous demotion of Prince Anhe of the First Rank Yolo and his sons, which was one of the causes of abolition of the Prince An peerage.

== Life ==
Nuoni was born on 4 February 1643 to Princess Consort Yanxijie of the Second Rank, lady Tunggiya. He had two brothers, Luokeduo and prematurely deceased Bahata.

In 1656, Nuoni was granted a title of prince of the third rank. Nuoni was blamed by Yolo for unwilling to demonstrate the filial piety and demoted to the commoner in 1665.

In 1690, Nuoni wrote a memorial denouncing the deeds of deceased Prince Anhe of the First Rank Yolo. In the memorial Yolo was accused of sowing discord among the ministers and false accusation of lack of filial piety. Yolo's sons Prince Xi of the Second Rank Jingxi and Prince Qin of the Second Rank Yunduan were implicated in the case. As a result, Yolo was deprived of his posthumous name and demoted to prince of the second rank, Jingxi was demoted to grace defender duke and Yunduan was demoted to prince of the fourth rank and further deposed for sympathy to Han Chinese rebels.

In 1700, Nuoni had his title restored after it was revealed that Yolo's allegations towards him were unjustified, as mentioned in the decree:

“诺尼无罪,着仍授为多罗贝勒" "Nuoni is innocent, hereby is eligible to held a title of Prince of the Third Rank"

Nuoni died on 9 February 1701 and was succeeded by his 13th son, Nuo'entuohe, who was granted a title of grace defender duke with the honorifical name "Keshun" (恪顺, meaning: "respectful and obedient").

== Family ==
Nuoni was initially married to lady Khorchin Borjigit, daughter of the prince consort Bilaxi. Later on, he married lady Irgen Gioro, a daughter of master commandant of cloud cavalry Fulu. He had 20 sons, among whom only 8 survived the childhood.

- Primary consort, of the Khorchin Borjigin clan (嫡夫人科尔沁博尔济吉特氏)
  - Etuhun (额图浑; February 1661 - May 1661), second son
  - Ergulen (额尔古楞; 1662–1664), fourth son
  - Namen (讷门; 1663–1724), sixth son
  - Maqitu (码启图; 1674–1677), tenth son
  - Egulid (额古礼德;1676-1726), eleventh son
- Second primary consort of the Irgen Gioro clan (继夫人伊尔根觉罗氏)
  - Grace Defender Keshun Duke Noentohe (奉恩镇国恪顺公诺恩托和;1685-1739), 13th son
  - Bai'erming (柏尔明; December 1686 - January 1687), 14th son
  - Bai'erbao (柏尔保; 1687–1688), 15th son
- Mistress, of the Han clan (妾韩氏)
  - Nu'ertai (努尔泰; 1659–1717), first son
  - Wu'ertai (武尔泰;1662-1709), fifth son
  - Nu'ersai (弩尔赛;1664-1668), seventh son
  - Du'ertai (都尔泰;1667-1714), eighth son
- Mistress, of the Feng clan (妾冯氏)
  - Mangnai (莽鼐; February 1661 - September 1661), third son
- Mistress, of the Zhang clan (妾张氏)
  - Mengge (蒙格;1674-1675), ninth son
  - Leqir (乐齐尔;1679-1681),12th son
  - Wentohe (温托和;1689-1734), 17th son
- Mistress, of the Fuca clan (妾富察氏)
  - Furha (福尔哈;August 1688-January 1689), 16th son
  - Bulun (布伦; 1695–1747), 18th son
- Mistress, of the Wang clan (妾王氏), daughter of Wang Si (王四)
- Mistress, of the Wang clan (妾王氏), daughter of Wang Guodong (王国栋)
  - Burhun (布尔浑; March 1699-July 1699), 19th son
  - Burhan (布尔罕; 1703–1704), 20th son
