= Jingxi (prince) =

- Prince Xi of the Second Rank

Prince Xi of the Second Rank
- Reign: 1682 – 1717
- Predecessor: peerage created
- Successor: peerage abolished
- Born: 1663
- Died: 1717 (aged 53–54)
- House: Aisin Gioro
- Father: Yolo
- Mother: Lady Hešeri (daughter of Sonin)

Jingxi (Chinese: 景熙 or 經希; 1663–1717) was Qing dynasty imperial prince as 17th son of Yolo, Abatai's son and Nurhaci's grandson. Initially Jingxi became Prince Xi of the Second Rank, but was convicted of crime and demoted to grace defender duke. The peerage was not granted iron-cap status, which meant that each successive bearer of the title would hold diminished ranks vis-a-vis his predecessor. Prince Xi of the Second Rank peerage was passed to Longdiao, Jingxi's son. As Longdiao's sons died prematurely, the peerage became extinct.

== Life of Jingxi ==
Jingxi was born in 1663 to lady Hešeri, Yolo's third primary consort and aunt of Empress Xiaochengren, Kangxi Emperor's first empress. In 1683, Jingxi was made the first Prince Xi of the Second Rank (僖郡王, meaning "guardful", "precautious"). In 1690, after Nuoni (member of Prince Keqin peerage ) discovered that Yolo had sown discord among the regents and princes and, moreover, had framed Nuoni for unwilling to demonstrate filial piety, Jingxi was demoted to grace defender duke (奉恩镇国公) along with his father, who became posthumously demoted to Prince An of the Second Rank. However, the demotion of Jingxi did not interrupt his political career. In 1715, Jingxi was appointed as right Vice Director of Imperial Clan Court. Jingxi died in 1717 and his previous title was not recovered.

== Family of Jingxi ==
Jingxi's primary wife was lady Fuca, daughter of Niyahan (尼雅汉).

Consorts and issue:

- Primary consort, of the Fuca clan (嫡夫人 富察氏)
- Mistress, of the Irgen Gioro clan (妾 伊尔根觉罗氏)
- Mistress, of the Li clan (妾李氏), daughter of Li Xiao (李孝)
  - Longyun (隆云; 1697–1698), second son
  - Longsui (隆绥；1698-1765), fourth son.
    - Married lady Gorolo as primary wife, lady Wenceheng as a second wife and had no issue.
  - Longxia (隆霞; 1703–1710), fifth son
- Mistress, of the Kang clan (妾康氏)
  - Longdiao (隆调;1705-1763), sixth son
    - Married lady Heje as a primary wife and had three sons.
- Mistress, of the Li clan (妾李氏), daughter of Li Yousong (李友松)
  - Longdai (隆岱, 1692–1718), first son
  - Longyu (隆璵,1697-1700), third son

== Family tree ==
Nurhaci
Abatai; Prince Raoyu of the Second Rank	Sonin	Hong Taiji	Dodo; Prince Yu Tong of the First Rank
Yolo; Prince An He of First Rank	Lady Heseri; 3rd Primary Consort	Gabula	Shunzhi Emperor	Lady Heseri; Step Primary Consort	Chani; Prince of Third Rank
Empress Xiaochengren	Kangxi Emperor
Yunreng; Prince Li Mi of the First Rank (posthumous title)
17
Lady Fuca; Grace Defender Duchess	Jingxi; Grace Defender Duke	Lady Li daughter of Li Xiao	Lady Kang	Lady Li daughter of Li Yousong
2	4	5	6	1	3
Longyun	Longsui	Longxia	Longdiao	Longdai	Longyu
