= Lolohun =

- Prince Yanxi of the Second Rank 多羅衍禧郡王

Head of the House of Prince Keqin peerage
- Predecessor: Yoto (as Prince Cheng of the First Rank)
- Successor: Luokeduo (as Prince Ping of the Second Rank)
- Born: 1 April 1623
- Died: 11 September 1646 (aged 23); Sichuan
- Spouse: Lady Tunggiya
- Issue: Luokeduo; Nuoni
Posthumous name
- Prince Yanxijie of the Second Rank (衍禧介郡王)
- Father: Yoto
- Mother: Lady Hada Nara

Lolohun (羅洛渾; 1 April 1623 – 11 September 1646) was Qing dynasty imperial prince as the first son of Yoto, Daišan's grandson and Nurhaci's great-grandson. Lolohun was the second holder of the Prince Keqin of the Second Rank peerage and the sole holder of prince Yanxi of the Second Rank title. After his death, the peerage was renamed to Prince Ping of the Second Rank.

== Life ==
Lolohun was born on 1 April 1623 to lady Hada Nara, daughter of Urgudai and princess Mangguji, Nurhaci's third daughter.

=== Military and political career ===
Yoto was granted a title of prince of the Third Rank in 1638, shortly after father's death. In 1640, Lolohun led his troops together with Jirgalang to Xingshan, where accepted submission to Qing by indigenous leaders Subandai (苏班岱) and Arbadai (阿尔巴岱). As a reward, Lolohun was given one horse with harness and weapons. In 1641, Lolohun participated in the Battle of Song-Jin under the command of Dodo, Hooge and Hong Taiji, where he captured and forced to surrender Ming dynasty general Hong Chengchou. Lolohun received 70 rolls of satin with four-clawed mang dragon pattern as a reward.

In 1643, Lolohun did not wear mourning garment during the funeral of Primary Consort Minhui Gonghe which resulted in deprivation of his title. In 1644, when Lolohun supported Dorgon and Wu Sangui in pacification of Li Zicheng's rebellion, he was granted a title of Prince Yanxi of the Second Rank (多罗衍禧郡王). Lolohun was present at the sacrifices at the Altar of Heaven, where underage Shunzhi Emperor took the oath while claiming Mandate of Heaven.

As a commander of Bordered Red Banner forces, Lolohun belonged to the most influential Qing dynasty princes, including Prince Regent Dorgon, Prince Zheng of the First Rank Jirgalang, Prince Ying of the First Rank Ajige and Prince Yu of the First Rank Dodo. In 1646, Lolohun followed Hooge in the conquest of Sichuan.

=== Death and succession ===
Yoto died during conquest of Sichuan on 11 September 1646 and was succeeded by his eldest son, Luokeduo. Upon Luokeduo's inheritance, the title was renamed to prince Ping of the Second Rank. In 1671, Kangxi Emperor added a character "jie" (介) to Lolohun's title, so the full posthumous title sounded: "Prince Yanxijie of the Second Rank" (多罗衍禧介郡王, meaning: "uniting those overflowing with happiness").

== Family ==
Lolohun was married to lady Tunggiya, daughter of Tong Yangxing (佟养性, d.1632), eminent general of the early Qing dynasty and close relative of Empress Xiaokangzhang.

Consort and issue:

- Primary consort, of the Tunggiya clan (嫡福晋佟佳氏)
  - Prince Pingbi of the Second Rank Luokeduo (多罗平比郡王罗科铎, 10 August 1640 – 14 August 1682), first son
  - Bahata (巴哈塔, 23 October 1642 - 4 September 1651), second son
  - Prince of the Third Rank Nuoni (多罗贝勒诺尼, 4 February 1643 - 9 February 1701), third son
