= Prince An =

Title in the Qing dynasty of China

Prince An of the First Rank
- Traditional Chinese: 和碩安親王
- Simplified Chinese: 和硕安亲王
Transcriptions
Standard Mandarin
- Hanyu Pinyin: héshuò ān qīnwáng
- Wade–Giles: ho-shuo an ch'in-wang

Prince Raoyu of the First Rank
- Traditional Chinese: 和碩饒餘親王
- Simplified Chinese: 和硕饶余亲王
Transcriptions
Standard Mandarin
- Hanyu Pinyin: héshuò ráoyú qīnwáng
- Wade–Giles: ho-shuo jao-yü ch'in-wang

Prince An of the First Rank, or simply Prince An, was the title of a princely peerage used in China during the Manchu-led Qing dynasty (1644–1912). As the Prince An peerage was not awarded "iron-cap" status, this meant that each successive bearer of the title would normally start off with a title downgraded by one rank vis-à-vis that held by his predecessor. However, the title would generally not be downgraded to any lower than a feng'en fuguo gong except under special circumstances.

The first bearer of the title was Abatai (1589–1646), the seventh son of Nurhaci, the founder of the Qing dynasty. In 1644, he was awarded the status of a junwang (prince of the second rank) by his nephew, the Shunzhi Emperor, under the title "Prince Raoyu of the Second Rank" (Manchu: ᡩᠣᡵᠣᡳ
ᠪᠠᠶᠠᠨ
ᡤᡳᠶᡡᠨ
ᠸᠠᠩ doroi bayan giyūn wang) or simply "Prince Raoyu". The title was renamed to "Prince An of the Second Rank" in 1651 when it was passed down to Abatai's fourth son, Yolo (1625–1689). In 1723, the Yongzheng Emperor abolished the Prince An peerage on the grounds that Yolo had "sowed discord among key ministers and disrespected the Emperor". However, in 1778, the Qianlong Emperor considered Abatai and Yolo's past contributions to the Qing Empire, and decided to restore the Prince An peerage as a feng'en fuguo gong title – the lowest possible grade for a princely peerage. Qikun, a great-great-grandson of Yolo, was selected to inherit the title. The title was passed down over a total of ten generations and was held by ten persons.

== Members of the Prince An / Prince Raoyu peerage ==
Members of the Prince An / Prince Raoyu peerage
- Abatai (1589–1646), Nurhaci's seventh son, initially a beile from 1626 to 1644, awarded the title "Raoyu" in 1636, promoted to junwang (second-rank prince) in 1644, posthumously honoured as Prince Raoyumin of the First Rank (饒餘敏親王) in 1662
  - Yolo (岳樂; 1625–1689), Abatai's fourth son, held the title Prince An of the Second Rank from 1651 to 1654, promoted to qinwang (first-rank prince) in 1654, posthumously honoured as Prince Anhe of the First Rank (安和郡王), posthumously demoted to a junwang in 1700 and stripped of his posthumous title
    - Ma'erhun (瑪爾渾; 1663–1709), Yolo's 15th son, held the title Prince An of the Second Rank from 1689 to 1709, posthumously honoured as Prince Anyi of the Second Rank (安懿郡王)
      - Huayi (華圯; 1685–1718), Ma'erhun's second son, held the title Prince An of the Second Rank from 1709 to 1718, posthumously honoured as Prince Anjie of the Second Rank (安節郡王)
      - Huabin (華彬; 1686–1735), Ma'erhun's third son, held a feng'en jiangjun title from 1705 to 1733, stripped of his title in 1733
        - Xigui (錫貴; 1707–1772), Huabin's second son, posthumously honoured as a feng'en fuguo gong
          - Daiying (岱英; 1730–1780), Xigui's eldest son, posthumously honoured as a feng'en fuguo gong
          - Qikun (奇崑; 1739–1783), Xigui's second son, held the title of a feng'en fuguo gong from 1778 to 1783
            - Chongji (崇積; 1780–1821), Qikun's third son, held the title of a feng'en fuguo gong from 1783 to 1804, stripped of his title in 1804
            - Bulantai (布蘭泰; 1751–1821), Daiying's second son, held the title of a feng'en fuguo gong from 1805 to 1821
              - Hengming (亨明; 1799–1860), Bulantai's fourth son, held the title of a feng'en fuguo gong from 1821 to 1860
                - Yushan (裕善), Hengming's eldest son, held a fengguo jiangjun title from 1844 to 1854
                  - Huipu (惠普), Yushan's eldest son, held a feng'en jiangjun title from 1854–?
                - Yu'an (裕安), Hengming's second son, held a fengguo jiangjun title from 1850 to 1875, had no male heir
                - Yuke (裕恪; 1843–1873), Hengming's third son, held the title of a feng'en fuguo gong from 1861 to 1873
                  - Yipu (意普; 1868–?), Yuke's second son, held the title of a feng'en fuguo gong from 1873–?

=== Šanggiyan's line ===
Šanggiyan's line
- Abatai
  - Šanggiyan (尚建; 1606–1630), Abatai's eldest son, held a beizi title, posthumously honoured as Xianque Beizi (賢慤貝子)
    - Subutu (蘇布圖; 1625–1648), Šanggiyan's eldest son, initially a feng'en fuguo gong, promoted to beizi in 1646, posthumously honoured as Daomin Beizi (悼愍貝子)
    - Qiangdu (強度; 1630–1651), Šanggiyan's second son, held a beizi title from 1649 to 1651, posthumously honoured as Jiejie Beizi (介潔貝子)
      - Yanling (顏齡; 1648–1701), Subutu's eldest son, held a feng'en zhenguo gong title from 1652 to 1701, had no male heir

=== Bohoto's line ===
Bohoto's line
- Abatai
  - Bohoto (博和託; 1610–1648), Abatai's second son, initially a feng'en fuguo gong, promoted to beizi in 1644, posthumously honoured as Wenliang Beizi (溫良貝子)
    - Wenggu (翁古; died 1647), Bohoto's eldest son, posthumously honoured as Feng'en Fuguo Huaimin Gong (奉恩輔國懷愍公)
      - Bowei (博危), Wenggu's eldest son, held a feng'en fuguo gong title from 1647 to 1649, had no male heir
    - Jinzhu (錦注), Bohoto's second son, posthumously honoured as Feng'en Fuguo Huaiyi Gong (奉恩輔國懷儀公), had no male heir
    - Fokeqiku (佛克齊庫), Bohoto's third son, posthumously honoured as Jiejie Beizi (介潔貝子), had no male heir
    - Zhangtai (彰泰; 1636–1690), Bohoto's fourth son, initially a feng'en zhenguo gong, held a beizi title from 1652 to 1690
      - Baishou (百綬; 1654–1691), Zhangtai's eldest son, held a feng'en zhenguo gong title from 1668 to 1686, demoted to zhenguo jiangjun in 1686, stripped of his title in 1688
      - Mingrui (明瑞; 1666–1715), Zhangtai's fifth son, held a feng'en zhenguo gong title from 1680 to 1698, stripped of his title in 1698
      - Tunzhu (屯珠; 1658–1718), Zhangtai's third son, held a feng'en zhenguo gong title from 1690 to 1718, posthumously awarded beizi status and honoured as Feng'en Zhenguo Kemin Gong (奉恩鎮國恪敏公)
        - Anzhan (安詹; 1694–1696), Tunzhu's eldest son
        - Wenzhao (文昭), Tunzhu's second son
          - Fengxin (逢信; 1706–1787), Wenzhao's third son and Anzhan's adoptive son, held a feng'en fuguo gong title from 1718 to 1747, posthumously honoured as Feng'en Fuguo Gongke Gong (奉恩輔國恭恪公)
            - Shengchang (盛昌; 1751–1821), Fengxin's second son, held a feng'en fuguo gong title from 1747 to 1757, stripped of his title in 1757, restored as a zhenguo jiangjun in 1758 and then promoted back to feng'en fuguo gong
              - Chengmian (成綿; 1761–?), Shengchang's eldest son
              - Qingyi (慶怡l 1763–1813), Shengchang's second son, held a second class fuguo jiangjun title from 1784 to 1787, promoted to feng'en fuguo gong in 1787
                - Jingxi (景錫; 1793–1834), Chengmian's eldest son
                - Jinglun (景綸; 1796–1847), Chengmian's second son and Qingyi's adoptive son, held a feng'en fuguo gong title from 1813 to 1839, stripped of his title in 1839
                - Jingchong (景崇; 1811–1880), Chengmian's fifth son, held a feng'en fuguo gong title from 1839 to 1858, stripped of his title in 1858
                  - Chunkan (純堪; 1819–1882), Jingxi's third son, held a feng'en fuguo gong title from 1859 to 1882
                    - Linjia (麟嘉; 1851–1901), Chunkan's eldest son, held a second class fuguo jiangjun title from 1883 to 1889, promoted to feng'en fuguo gong in 1889
                      - Zengpei (增培; 1883–?), Rongsen's second son and Linjia's adoptive son, held a feng'en fuguo gong title from 1902–?

=== Yolo's line ===
Yolo's line
- Abatai
  - Yolo
    - Saileng'e (塞楞額; died 1698), Yolo's eighth son, held a third class fuguo jiangjun title from 1672 to 1698
      - Sehentu (色痕圖), Saileng'e's eldest son, held a second class fengguo jiangjun title from 1699 to 1722, stripped of his title in 1722
      - Sebei (色貝), Saileng'e's fourth son, held a feng'en jiangjun title from 1705 to 1751
        - Saichong'a (賽沖阿), Sebei's 12th son, held a feng'en jiangjun title from 1751 to 1793
          - Wu'erxisong'a (烏爾希松阿), Saichong'a's second son, held a feng'en jiangjun title from 1793 to 1814, had no male heir
      - Wu'ertu (務爾圖), Saileng'e's sixth son, held a feng'en jiangjun title from 1732 to 1750
        - Linggao (齡高), Wu'ertu's eldest son, held a feng'en jiangjun title from 1735 to 1771
          - Dazong'a (達宗阿), Linggao's son
            - Yichong'e (伊崇額), Dazong'a's eldest son, held a feng'en jiangjun title from 1771 to 1779, stripped of his title in 1779
        - Lingsong (齡嵩), Wu'ertu's second son
          - Daqing'a (達慶阿), Lingsong's eldest son, held a feng'en jiangjun title from 1756 to 1769
      - Xiwen (熙文), Sehentu's second son, held a feng'en jiangjun title from 1711 to 1725, stripped of his title in 1725
      - Chuonai (綽鼐), Sehentu's third son, held a feng'en jiangjun title from 1712 to 1723, stripped of his title in 1723
    - Saibuli (塞布禮), Yolo's 16th son, held a third class fuguo jiangjun title from 1678 to 1708, stripped of his title in 1708
    - Jingxi (經希), Yolo's 17th son; see Prince Xi for details
    - Yunduan (蘊端; 1671–1705), Yolo's 18th son; see Prince Qin for details

== Family tree ==
Family of Prince An

adoption
Abatai 阿巴泰 (1589–1646); Prince Raoyumin 饒餘敏親王 (1626–1646)
Šanggiyan 尚建 (1606–1630); Xian Beizi 賢慤貝子	Bohoto 博和託 (1610–1648); Wenliang Beizi 溫良貝子 (1644–?)	Bolo 博洛 (1613–1652); Prince Duanzhong 端重親王 (1636–1652)	Yolo 岳樂 (1625–1689); Prince An of the Second Rank 安郡王 (1651–1689)
Saileng'e 塞楞額 (died 1698); Third Class Fuguo Jiangjun 三等輔國將軍 (1672–1698)	Ma'erhun 瑪爾渾 (1663–1709); Prince Anyi (of the Second Rank) 安懿郡王 (1689–1709)	Saibuli 塞布禮; Third Class Fuguo Jiangjun 三等輔國將軍 (1678–1708) (stripped of his title)	Jingxi 經希; Prince Xi (of the Second Rank) 僖郡王	Yunduan 蘊端 (1671–1705); Prince Qin (of the Second Rank) 勤郡王 (stripped of his title)
Huayi 華圯 (1685–1718); Prince Anjie (of the Second Rank) 安節郡王 (1709–1718)	Huabin 華彬 (1686–1735); Feng'en Jiangjun 奉恩將軍 (1705–1733) (stripped of his title)
Xigui 錫貴 (1707–1772); Feng'en Fuguo Gong 奉恩輔國公 (posthumously awarded)
Daiying 岱英 (1730–1780); Feng'en Fuguo Gong 奉恩輔國公 (posthumously awarded)	Qikun 奇崑 (1739–1783); Feng'en Fuguo Gong 奉恩輔國公 (1778–1783)
Bulantai 布蘭泰 (1751–1821); Feng'en Fuguo Gong 奉恩輔國公 (1805–1821)	Chongji 崇積 (1780–1821); Feng'en Fuguo Gong 奉恩輔國公 (1783–1804)
Hengming 亨明 (1799–1860); Feng'en Fuguo Gong 奉恩輔國公 (1821–1860)
Yushan 裕善; Fengguo Jiangjun 奉國將軍 (1844–1854)	Yu'an 裕安; Fengguo Jiangjun 奉國將軍 (1850–1875)	Yuke 裕恪 (1843–1873); Feng'en Fuguo Gong 奉恩輔國公 (1861–1873)
Yipu 意普 (1868–?); Feng'en Fuguo Gong 奉恩輔國公 (1873–?)
Shanduo 善鐸 (1889–?)
Jinrui 金瑞 (1912–?)

== See also ==
- Royal and noble ranks of the Qing dynasty
