= Sahaliyan =

- Prince Ying of the First Rank 和碩穎親王

Head of the House of Prince Ying peerage
- Predecessor: peerage created
- Successor: Adali
- Born: 19 June 1604; Liaodong, Manchuria, Ming dynasty
- Died: 11 June 1636 (aged 31)
- Burial: Benxi, Henan
- Spouse: Ulanara Jihai
- Issue: Adali; Lekdehun; Dulan
Posthumous name
- Prince Yingyi of the First Rank (穎毅親王)
- House: Aisin Gioro
- Father: Daišan

Sahaliyan, alternatively rendered as Sahalin (Manchu: ᠰᠠᡥᠠᠯᡳᠶᠠᠨ, Chinese: 薩哈璘; 19 June 1604 – 11 June 1636), was an imperial prince of the Qing dynasty of China. He was the third son of Prince Lilie of the First Rank Daišan and a grandson of Nurhaci. Sahaliyan was posthumously honoured as Prince Ying of the First Rank for the merits during Qing conquest of the Central Plain. The peerage was found extinct after his son, Adali, was executed for treason.

== Life ==
Sahaliyan was born as a son of Second Primary Princess Consort Lilie of the First Rank, lady Yehe Nara on 19 June 1604 in Liaodong. Sahaliyan enjoyed Hong Taiji's favour since young, which resulted in his loyalty to Hong Taiji. He was considered to be among the most well-educated Manchu nobles of the early Qing period, being highly literate in Chinese, Manchu, and Mongolian.

=== Military and political career ===
Sahalian's military career started as early as in Tianming era, when he raided Chahar and Khorchin in 1625 with army consisting of five thousand soldiers. In 1626, he conquered Khalkha tribes together with his father, Daišan. That same year, he was granted a title of prince of the third rank together with Yoto and other imperial princes. Sahaliyan was reluctant to accept the title as he claimed incompetence and declared his loyalty to Khan. Nevertheless, it was Sahaliyan who laid a groundwork to election of Hong Taiji as a Khan.

=== Infliction in Manggultai's accident ===
Actually, when Manggūltai was deposed in 1633, it was Sahaliyan who arrested princess Mangguji, Nurhaci's third daughter. The reasons were Mangguji's request to Degelei to murder her second prince consort and the cold relationship between her and Hong Taiji. Hong Taiji saw Mangguji and her brother, Degelei, as enemies and therefore wanted to murder them. In 1635, Mangguji was murdered with her second daughter, whom Hong Taiji's son Hooge had rejected as a wife.

=== Death and legacy ===
Sahaliyan died of illness on 11 June 1636 at the age of 32 (in sui). His death deeply saddened Hong Taiji whi generously treated his family members and posthumously honoured him as Prince Ying of the First Rank. Hong Taiji cancelled court sessions for 3 days, the mourning period exceptionally reserved for meritorious imperial princes. Sahalin was succeeded by his eldest son, Adali, while his second son, Lekdehun, was granted a title of Prince Shuncheng of the Second Rank.

In 1672, Kangxi Emperor added a character "yi" (毅) to Sahalian's title, so the full posthumous title was: Prince Yingyi of the First Rank (和硕颖毅亲王, meaning "talented and full of determination"). In 1755, Qianlong Emperor ordered to place Sahalin's memorial tablet in the Temple of Worthies so as to commemorate his role in the conquest of the Ming dynasty.

== Interesting facts ==
=== Ghost in the Mukden forbidden city ===
The optical illusion of Sahalian was first visible after his death according to the legends. In 6 months after Sahalin's death, Hong Taiji slept in the Fenghuang building of the Mukden Palace. Hong Taiji dreamt of himself leaving inner court of Mukden palace together with Empress Xiaoduanwen onto the eastern wall of the city. After the short walk, Hong Taiji was disrupted by an enormous palace, where he saw Daishan and Sahaliyan awaiting him. Hong Taiji gave them clothes, let them in and sat on the throne. After an hour of bantering, Hong Taizi felt puzzled how Sahalin could be alive. Hong Taiji ordered to return to Mukden palace. While Hong Taiji was leaving the hall, Sahalian stopped him and requested for one calf.

The dream was described by great secretary Hife (of the Hešeri clan), Ganglin and other present at the court session other day.

The story was continued by "Chronicle of Great Ming" before the accomplishment of "Great Code of Qing". However, the "Chronicle of Great Ming" gives the story a shade of authenticity by mentioning that Hong Taiji rewarded Lekdehun and made him one of the iron-cap princes under the title "Prince Shuncheng of the Second Rank".

== Family ==
Sahaliyan was married to Ulanara Jihai (乌拉那拉氏·济海), daughter of Bujantai. His primary consort was executed for treason together with Adali.

Consorts and issue:

- Primary consort, of the Ulanara clan (嫡福晋乌拉那拉氏, d. 30 September 1643), personal name Jihai
  - Adali (阿达礼, 28 October 1624 – 30 September 1643), first son
  - Princess of the Fourth Rank (县主, 1620–1667), first daughter
    - Married He'erben (和尔本) of the Donggiya clan in 1633
  - Lekdehun, Prince Shuncheng Gonghui of the Second Rank (多罗顺承恭惠郡王勒克德浑, 25 June 1629 – 4 May 1652), second son
  - Princess of the Fourth Rank (县主, 1625–1700), second daughter
    - Married Prince of the Second Rank Tenggis (腾吉斯) of the Sunid Borjigin clan in 1640 and had issue (one daughter, Princess Consort Duanzhongding of the First Rank)
  - Dulan, Grace Defender Duke (奉恩镇国公杜兰, 11 September 1633 – 9 June 1675), third son
