= Bordered Red Banner =

Military service banner in Ancient China

- Flag of the Bordered Red Banner
- Active: 1615 – 1912
- Country: Later Jin dynasty Qing dynasty
- Type: Cavalry; Musketeers
- Part of: Eight Banners
- Commander: Daišan; The Emperor

Bordered Red Banner

Chinese name
- Traditional Chinese: 鑲紅旗
- Simplified Chinese: 镶红旗
Transcriptions
Standard Mandarin
- Hanyu Pinyin: xiānghóngqí

Mongolian name
- Mongolian Cyrillic: Хөвөөт улаан хошуу

Manchu name
- Manchu script: ᡴᡠᠪᡠᡥᡝ ᡶᡠᠯᡤᡳᠶᠠᠨ ᡤᡡᠰᠠ
- Romanization: kubuhe fulgiyan gūsa

The Bordered Red Banner (Chinese: 鑲紅旗) was one of the Eight Banners of the Manchu military and society among the lower five banners during the Later Jin and Qing dynasties of China.

Nurhaci originally assigned both Red Banners to Daišan. Later on, the Bordered Red Banner was assigned to both Yoto and Šoto, eldest and second sons of Daišan.

== Members ==
- Daišan (Prince Li of the First Rank, 2nd son of Nurhaci, first commander of both Red Banners)
- Yoto (Prince Keqin, Manchu Prince, eldest son of Daisan, as secondary commander after his father and later held control over the Bordered Red Banner)
- Šoto (2nd son of Daisan, along with his brother Yoto, was involved in both red banners)
- Mandahai (7th son of Daisan)
- Canggadai (Eldest son of Mandahai, grandson of Daisan)
- Giyesu (Grandson of Daisan, distant cousin loyal supporter of the Kangxi Emperor)
- Lianyuan
- Consort Jin
- Noble Consort Ying (Mongol)
- Zhou Youde (Han)
- Imperial Noble Consort Keshun

== Notable clans ==
- Barin
- Cuigiya
- Tatara
- Wanyan
- Namdulu
- Zhou
