= Xiangjun =

Xiangjun may refer to:

- Xiangjun (title), a noble title used in imperial China
- Xiang Army or Xiangjun, an army raised from Hunan during the Qing dynasty
- Hunan Shoking F.C. or Hunan Xiangjun F.C., a Chinese football club

== Given name ==
- Li Xiangjun (1624–1654), Chinese female singer of the Ming dynasty
- Zhai Xiangjun (1939–2019), Chinese translator
- Ma Xiangjun (born 1964), Chinese archer

== See also ==
- Xiang Jun, Chinese footballer
