= Feng'en zhenguo gong =

Feng'en zhenguo gong (Chinese: 奉恩鎮國公; pinyin: Fèng'ēn zhènguó gōng; Manchu: ᡴᡝᠰᡳ ᠪᡝ ᡨᡠ᠋ᠸᠠᡴᡳᠶᠠᡵᠠ ᡤᡠᡵᡠᠨ ᠪᡝ ᡩᠠᠯᡳᡵᡝ ᡤᡠᠩ, romanized: kesi-be tuwakiyara gurun-be dalire gung; Mongolian: Хишгийг сахих улсын түшээ гүн), translated as "Grace Defender Duke" or "Duke Who Guards the State by the Grace" or "State Duke of the First Rank", was one of the royal and noble titles of the Qing dynasty. A title was created in 1653 by division of the zhenguo gong title into two ranks following the criterion of sharing Eight Privileges. The title was the seventh highest rank in the extended system of ranks and the fifth inheritable rank.

== Rules of grant ==
The title could be granted to the son of Prince of the First Rank born to Primary Princess Consort of the First Rank. The son of Primary Princess Consort of the First Rank could be further promoted until he reached the father's title (iron-cap peerage). The title was usually the lowest possible to inherit in the peerage of the First Rank except of special circumstances. The title could also convey a honorifical name consisting of two characters. The title could be made perpetually inheritable in case of abolition of the peerage.

The title could be also granted to the son of Prince of the Fourth rank born to Primary Princess Consort of the Fourth Rank.

== Family members ==
=== Princess consort ===
Princess consort was styled as "feng'en zhenguo gong furen" (奉恩鎮國公夫人), which translates to "State Duchess of the First Rank". Often the title was replaced by the term Primary Wife (嫡妻).

=== Sons ===
Son of the feng'en zhenguo gong was granted a title of feng'en fuguo gong (奉恩輔國公, translated as: "grace bulwark duke" or "State Duke of the Second Rank"). The son of feng'en zhenguo gong born to mistress was given a title being two ranks lower.

=== Daughters ===
Daughter born to primary consort of feng'en zhenguo duke was granted a title of Lady of the Third Rank (鄉君). Daughters born to secondary consort of feng'en zhenguo gong was granted a title of sixth rank clanswoman.

== Allowances and court attire ==
=== Feng'en zhenguo gong ===
==== Allowance ====
The allowance of grace defender duke reached 700 taels of silver and 700 hu of rice.

==== Attire ====
- Mandarin hat with ruby-inlaid finial decorated with two dragons and 5 pearls (winter) or 1 turquoise and 1 pearl (summer) and two-eyed peacock feathers
- Surcoat with two mandarin squares embroidered with four-clawed dragons
- Court dress befitting prince of the third rank
- Golden yellow girdles with dark blue pendants and square-shaped jade decorations
- Court beads with dark blue strings
- Fur coat made of the sable fur and trimmed with clair de lune colour satin

=== State duchess of the first rank ===
==== Attire ====
- Crown decorated with 3 peacocks each embellished with three pearls, finial with 5 pearls and ruby and 3 strings of pearls connected with two lapis lazuli inlaid plaques
- Diadem decorated with 5 ruyi cloud shaped plaques bejeweled with pearls and 3 strings of pearls connected with two lapis lazuli inlaid plaques
- Formal and semiformal robes befitting princess consorts of the third rank
- Surcoat embroidered with 8 roundels of flowers according to the luoshu pattern (2 circles on the shoulders, two circles on the breast and back respectively and 4 roundels on the bottom

=== Xiangjun ===
==== Allowance ====
The basic allotment of xiangjun reached 40 taels and 40 hu of rice. As most of the ladies of the third rank were married off, the allowance included 40 taels and 5 rolls of fabrics. Xiangjun (title) was allowed to have 4 personal maids and 2 bodyguards.

==== Attire ====
- Crown and diadem befitting state duchess of the second rank
- Court robes befitting princess consort of the third rank
- Semiformal robes befitting state duchess of the first rank

== Notable titles ==
The following table includes the titles conveying honorifical names.

Year	Title	Recipient	Background	Lineage/Peerage	References
1648	Grace defender Qinmin duke (奉恩鎮國勤敏公)	Abai	Third son of Nurhaci and lady Joogiya	Line of Abai	
1655	Grace defender Kexi duke (奉恩鎮國恪僖公)	Babutai	Sixth son of Nurhaci and Zhenge, lady Giyamuhut Gioro	Line of Babutai	
1657	Grace defender Huaiyi duke	Masan (瑪三)	Third son of prince Wenjian of the Fourth Rank Gu'ermahun and lady Sailate	Line of Šurhaci	
1658	Grace defender Huaisi duke (奉恩鎮國懷思公)	Martu (馬爾圖)	Son of prince Wenjian of the Fourth Rank Gu'ermahun and lady Sailate	Line of Šurhaci	
1658	Grace defender Huaisi duke (奉恩鎮國懷思公)	Wencika (溫齊咯)	Son of Tunqika and lady Wanyan	Line of Šurhaci	
1658	Grace defender Huaimin duke (奉恩鎮國懷愍公)	Seng'e (僧額)	Second son of prince Wenjian of the Fourth Rank Gu'ermahun and lady Sailate	Line of Šurhaci	
1658	Grace defender Daomin duke (奉恩鎮國悼愍公)	Guonai (國鼐)	Prematurely deceased second son of Prince Huaimin of the Fourth Rank, Sabi and lady Wanggiya	Line of Cuyen	
1660	Grace defender Duanchun duke (奉恩鎮國端純公)	Guogai (國蓋)	Fifth son of Amin	Line of Šurhaci	
1670	Grace defender Quehou duke (奉恩鎮國愨厚公)	Gaose (高塞)	Hong Taiji's son by lady Nara	Line of Gaose	
1673	Grace defender Chunhe duke (奉恩鎮國純和公)	Tuoketuohui (托克托慧)	Son of Prince Xiangmin of the Fourth Rank Wudahai and lady Niohuru	Line of Murhaci	
1685	Grace defender Xiangmin duke (奉恩鎮國襄敏公)	Wasan (瓦三)	Fourth son of Prince Wenjian of the Fourth Rank and lady Nara	Line of Šurhaci	
1724	Grace defender Kegong duke (奉恩鎮國恪恭公)	Dengsai (登塞)	Third son of Prince Kexi of the Fourth Rank Terhu and lady Xu	Line of Cuyen	
1739	Grace defender Keshun duke (奉恩鎮國恪順公)	Nuo'entuohe (諾恩托和)	13th son of Prince of the Third Rank Nuoni and lady Irgen Gioro	Prince Keqin	
1881	Grace defender Keshen duke (奉恩鎮國恪慎公)	Yixiang (奕湘)	Son of the former Prince of the Third Rank Mianlu and lady Fuca	Prince Guo	
