= Xiangjun (title) =

Xiangjun (Chinese: 乡君), translated as "Lady of the Village" or "Lady of the Third Rank", was a female noble title used in Imperial China. The title was created during the Western Jin dynasty for the stepmother of the Empress Wang Yuanji (wife of Sima Zhao), Lady Xiahou. During the Song dynasty, the title lost its prestige due to excessive grants and was abolished. Henceforth, the title was considered as part of the lowest tier of Chinese noble ranks.

== Rules of grant ==
=== Western Jin ===
The title was reserved to the mothers or stepmothers of empresses and wives of eminent officials, e.g. wife of general Yang Hu, lady Xiahou. The Title could be granted posthumously and convey honorifical name consisting of 2 characters.

=== Eastern Jin ===
The title could be granted to mothers or grandmothers of empresses. As an exception, the aunts of emperors might receive the title, e.g. the aunt of Emperor Yuan of Jin received a title of Village Lady Guangchang (广昌乡君). The title could convey honorifical name consisting of two characters, the name of the territory preceding the character "guo" (国) or one character. Even the princess could be demoted to the title of xiangjun, e.g. Princess Jinlong (晋隆公主), daughter of Emperor Xiaowu of Jin, who was demoted to the Village Lady of the East (东乡君) by the ruler of the Liu Song dynasty.

=== Former Zhao ===
The title was out of use as the only one person being granted this title was the paternal aunt of Empress Liu Fang, lady Zhang. The only granted title conveyed a honorifical name consisting of one character (慈乡君, "ci" meaning "benevolent").

=== Liu Song ===
The title could be granted to the mothers of empresses and imperial consorts. The only case when the mother of imperial consort was granted a title of xiangjun was the case of Chen Miaodeng, a noble consort of the Emperor Ming of Song. The title could specify names of territories being a matrimonium of the empress. The bearer of the longest title was lady Wang, the mother of Empress Yuan Qiwei. The longest title consisted of 8 characters and was rendered to "Village Lady Pingle of Xingan county of Yuzhang commandery" (豫章郡新淦县平乐乡君).

=== Southern Qi ===
The rules of grant remained the same since the Liu Song dynasty. The title could convey one character honorifical name and the names of territories being the matrimonium of the empress, e.g. mother of empress Wumu, lady Tan, received a title of Yuanjun (元君, meaning "primary lady"). The same title could be granted more than once, e.g. Lady of the Village Guangchang of the Yuhang county (余杭县广昌乡君). If the empress was born to a concubine, not to a primary wife, her biological mother received different title than her foster one.

=== Tang dynasty ===
After the establishment of the rank system, the mother or primary wife of the 4-rank official could be granted a title of xiangjun.

=== Jin dynasty ===
The Jin dynasty rank system included the title of xiangjun in the hierarchy of female noble ranks, unlike contemporary Song dynasty, Western Xia and Liao dynasty. Title could be granted to the wives and mothers of civil 5-rank officials or generals. Since 1197, the xiangjun could be further promoted to xianjun. The title was subdivided into 9 ranks. The only case when the wife of official could be granted a title of xiangjun was the case of the wife of military official Wei Quan

=== Ming dynasty ===
During the Ming dynasty, only the imperial clanswomen could be granted the title of xiangjun. The title could be given to the daughter of supporter general or great-great-granddaughter of prince of commandery.

=== Qing dynasty ===
The title of xiangjun could be granted to the daughter of defender duke or bulwark duke born to primary consort, daughter of beile born to secondary consort or great-great-granddaughter of prince of the first rank. As for exception, daughters of princes of the first rank born to mistresses who married princes of Qing vassal states received a title of xiangjun.

== Allowance and attire ==
=== Western Jin ===
During the Western Jin, one of the duties of xiangjun was serving the Empress during the Silkworm Ceremony. Xiangjun was the third person to arrive to the ceremony. On the day of sacrifice, xiangjun was responsible for gathering the silkworms. After the mulberry trees had been eaten by the silkworms, xiangjun returned to the room where silkworms were placed.

Usually, xiangjun was allowed to use the carriage with curtains, while her servants could use 2 horses.

==== Garments and regalias ====
Western Jin xiangjun was permitted to have her golden seal with purple ribbons and wear dark carmin jade pendants, brilliant purple stripes and pixiu-headed jade rings.

=== Ming dynasty ===
The duties of xiangjun were reduced to court functions due to her status.

==== Court attire ====
The court attire of xiangjun consisted of:

- Fengguan adorned with 3 pheasants
- Blue-and-red dashan
- Blue satin beizi embroidered with golden peacocks
- Xiapei embroidered with golden magpies

=== Qing dynasty ===
The basic allotment of xiangjun reached 40 taels and 40 hu of rice. As most of the ladies of the third rank were married off, the allowance included 40 taels and 5 rolls of fabrics. Xiangjun was allowed to have 4 personal maids and 2 bodyguards.

Before marrying a xiangjun, the family of prince consort should sacrifice 3 camels, 4 horses and 56 sheep. Since 1770, the family of prince consort should donate 2 horses, 2 oxen and 20 sheep.

The official ceremonial allowed xiangjun to have a banquet for 16 people, 2 horses, 2 sets of horse reins, 16 bottles of wine, 14 sheep and 16 cups of tea on the day of engagement. On the wedding day, the xiangjun was permitted to receive only 2 horses and 7 sheep. 2 dowry maids were allowed to accompany her.

==== Court attire ====
Xiangjun born to feng'en zhenguo gong:

- Crown and diadem befitting state duchess of the second rank
- Court robes befitting princess consort of the third rank
- Semiformal robes befitting state duchess of the first rank

Xiangjun born to feng'en fuguo gong

- Crown decorated with 2 golden peacocks each embellished with 3 pearls and finial incrusted with ruby
- Diadem decorated with 3 golden cloud-shaped plaques embellished with 3 pearls
- Court robes befitting princess consort of the third rank
- Semiformal robes befitting state duchess of the first rank
