= Prince Duanzhong =

Prince Duanzhong of the First Rank
- Traditional Chinese: 和碩端重親王
- Simplified Chinese: 和硕端重亲王
Transcriptions
Standard Mandarin
- Hanyu Pinyin: héshuò duānzhòng qīnwáng
- Wade–Giles: ho-shuo tuan-chung ch'in-wang

Prince Duanzhong of the First Rank, or simply Prince Duanzhong, was the title of a princely peerage used in China during the Manchu-led Qing dynasty (1644–1912). As the Prince Duanzhong peerage was not awarded "iron-cap" status, this meant that each successive bearer of the title would normally start off with a title downgraded by one rank vis-à-vis that held by his predecessor. However, the title would generally not be downgraded to any lower than a feng'en fuguo gong except under special circumstances.

The first bearer of the title was Bolo (1613–1652), the third son of Abatai and a grandson of Nurhaci, the founder of the Qing dynasty. In 1649, Bolo was created Prince Duanzhong of the First Rank by the Shunzhi Emperor. However, after his death, in 1659, he was posthumously stripped of his title. The peerage was passed down over only two generations and was held by only Bolo and his eighth son, Qikexin.

== Members of the Prince Duanzhong peerage ==
- Bolo (1613–1652), Abatai's third son, initially a beizi, made a beile in 1644, promoted to junwang in 1647 and then to qinwang in 1649 under the title "Prince Duanzhong of the First Rank". He was demoted to junwang in 1650 but was restored as a qinwang in 1651. He was honoured with the posthumous title "Prince Duanzhongding of the First Rank" (端重定親王) after his death in 1652, but was posthumously stripped of his title in 1659.
  - Qikexin (齊克新), Bolo's eighth son, inherited his father's peerage in 1652 as "Prince Duanzhong of the First Rank" but was demoted to beile in 1659, and posthumously honoured as "Huaisi Beile" (懷思貝勒) after death. He had no male heir to succeed him, so the Prince Duanzhong peerage ended with his death.

== See also ==
- Imperial and noble ranks of the Qing dynasty
