= Prince Qian =

Prince Qian of the Second Rank
- Traditional Chinese: 多羅謙郡王
- Simplified Chinese: 多罗谦郡王
Transcriptions
Standard Mandarin
- Hanyu Pinyin: duōluó qiān jùnwáng
- Wade–Giles: to-lo chien chün-wang

Prince Qian of the Second Rank, or simply Prince Qian, was the title of a princely peerage used in China during the Manchu-led Qing dynasty (1644–1912). As the Prince Qian peerage was not awarded "iron-cap" status, this meant that each successive bearer of the title would normally start off with a title downgraded by one rank vis-à-vis that held by his predecessor. However, the title would generally not be downgraded to any lower than a feng'en fuguo gong except under special circumstances.

The first bearer of the title was Wakeda (瓦克達; 1606–1652), Daišan's fourth son and a grandson of Nurhaci (the founder of the Qing dynasty). In 1651, Wakeda was granted the title "Prince Qian of the Second Rank" by the Shunzhi Emperor. The peerage was discontinued in 1698 after the Kangxi Emperor stripped Lioyung (留雍; Wakeda's son) of his title for committing an offence. However, the Qianlong Emperor restored the peerage in 1778 and granted it to Dongfu (洞福; Lioyung's great-grandson). Overall, the title was passed down over ten generations and held by nine persons.

== Members of the Prince Qian peerage ==
Members of the Prince Qian peerage
- Wakeda (瓦克達; 1606–1652), Daišan's fourth son and Nurhaci's grandson, made a third class zhenguo jiangjun in 1646, promoted to zhenguo gong in 1647, promoted to junwang in 1648, held the title Prince Qian of the Second Rank from 1651 to 1652, posthumously honoured as Prince Qianxiang of the Second Rank (謙襄郡王) in 1671
  - Garse (噶爾賽), Wakeda's third son, initially a third class fengguo jiangjun, held the title of a feng'en zhenguo gong from 1667 to 1669, demoted to feng'en jiangjun in 1669, restored as a feng'en zhenguo gong in 1682, stripped of his title in 1686
    - Haiqing (海清), Garse's eldest son, held the title of a feng'en zhenguo gong from 1682 to 1686, stripped of his title in 1686
  - Lioyung (留雍), Wakeda's second son, initially a third class fengguo jiangjun, promoted to zhenguo jiangjun in 1667, demoted to fengguo jiangjun in 1669, promoted to feng'en zhenguo gong in 1686, stripped of his title in 1698
    - Taihun (台渾), Lioyung's third son, held the title of a third class fuguo jiangjun from 1694 to 1720, stripped of his title in 1720
      - Zhongduan (忠端), Taihun's son
        - Dongfu (洞福), Zhongduan's son, held the title of a first class zhenguo jiangjun from 1778 to 1792
          - Dewen (德文), Dongfu's second son, initially a second class fengguo jiangjun, held the title of a zhenguo jiangjun from 1792 to 1826
            - Sufan (蘇藩), Dewen's eldest son, held the title of a first class fengguo jiangjun from 1812 to 1826, held the title of a first class zhenguo jiangjun from 1826 to 1836
            - Sumin (蘇敏), Dewen's second son, held the title of a third class fuguo jiangjun from 1816 to 1823, had no male heir
            - Sufang (蘇芳), Dewen's third son, held the title of a third class fuguo jiangjun from 1821 to 1851
              - Chengduan (承瑞), Sufang's fifth son and Sufan's adopted son, held the title of a zhenguo jiangjun from 1836 to 1867
                - Yuekang (岳康), Chengze's son and Chengduan's adopted son, held the title of a zhenguo jiangjun from 1868 to 1898
              - Chengfan (成藩), Sufang's eldest son, held the title of a third class fengguo jiangjun from 1824 to 1859
                - Binchang (斌昌), Chengfan's second son, held the title of a feng'en jiangjun from 1859 to 1884
                  - Enrong (恩榮), Binchang's eldest son, held the title of a feng'en jiangjun from 1884
                  - Enhou (恩厚), Binchang's second son and Yuekang's adopted son, held the title of a zhenguo jiangjun from 1898
            - Suzhe (蘇哲), Dewen's fourth son, held the title of a third class fuguo jiangjun from 1829 to 1862, stripped of his title in 1862
          - Degongtai (德恭泰), Dongfu's third son, held the title of a second class fengguo jiangjun from 1795 to 1820
            - Daying (達英), Degongtai's second son, held the title of a feng'en jiangjun from 1721 to 1843, had no male heir

== Family tree ==
Family of Prince Qian

adoption
Daišan 代善 (1583–1648); Prince Lilie of the First Rank 禮烈親王 (1636–1648)
Wakeda 瓦克達 (1606–1652); Prince Qianxiang of the Second Rank 謙襄郡王 (1651–1652)
Garse 噶爾賽; Feng'en Zhenguo Gong 奉恩鎮國公 (1682–1686) (stripped of his title)	Lioyung 留雍; Feng'en Zhenguo Gong 奉恩鎮國公 (1686–1698) (stripped of his title)
Taihun 台渾; Third Class Fuguo Jiangjun 三等輔國將軍 (1694–1720)
Zhongduan 忠端
Dongfu 洞福; First Class Zhenguo Jiangjun 一等鎮國將軍 (1778–1792)
Dewen 德文; Zhenguo Jiangjun 鎮國將軍 (1792–1826)
Sufang 蘇芳; Third Class Fuguo Jiangjun 三等輔國將軍 (1821–1851)	Sufan 蘇藩; First Class Zhenguo Jiangjun 一等鎮國將軍 (1826–1836)
Chengfan 成藩; Third Class Fengguo Jiangjun 三等奉國將軍 (1824–1859)	Chengduan 承瑞; Zhenguo Jiangjun 鎮國將軍 (1836–1867)
Binchang 斌昌; Feng'en Jiangjun 奉恩將軍 (1859–1884)	Yuekang 岳康; Zhenguo Jiangjun 鎮國將軍 (1868–1898)
Enhou 恩厚; Zhenguo Jiangjun 鎮國將軍 (1898–?)	Enrong 恩榮; Feng'en Jiangjun 奉恩將軍 (1884–?)

== See also ==
- Prince Li (禮)
- Royal and noble ranks of the Qing dynasty
