= Prince Ying (created 1636) =

Prince Ying of the First Rank
- Traditional Chinese: 和碩穎親王
- Simplified Chinese: 和硕颖亲王
Transcriptions
Standard Mandarin
- Hanyu Pinyin: héshuò yǐng qīnwáng
- Wade–Giles: ho-shuo ying ch'in-wang

Prince Ying of the First Rank, or simply Prince Ying, was the title of a princely peerage used in China during the Manchu-led Qing dynasty (1644–1912).

The first bearer of the title was Sahaliyan (1604–1636), the third son of Daišan and a grandson of Nurhaci, the founder of the Qing dynasty. The peerage was created in 1636 when Sahaliyan was posthumously awarded the title "Prince Ying of the First Rank" by his uncle Huangtaiji, Nurhaci's successor. Sahaliyan's eldest son, Adali (1624–1643), inherited the peerage and became the second Prince Ying. In 1643, after Huangtaiji's death, Adali and others plotted to replace Huangtaiji's designated successor, Fulin, with another prince, Dorgon. However, the plot was exposed and Adali was arrested and executed for treason.

== Members of the Prince Ying peerage ==
- Sahaliyan (薩哈璘; 1604–1636), Daišan's third son, posthumously awarded the title Prince Ying of the First Rank in 1636 and posthumously honoured as Prince Yingyi of the First Rank (穎毅親王)
  - Adali (阿達禮; 1624–1643), Sahaliyan's eldest son, held the title Prince Ying of the First Rank from 1636 to 1643, stripped of his title and executed in 1643 for treason

== Family tree ==
Nurhaci 努爾哈赤 (1559–1626)
Daišan 代善 (1583–1648); Prince Lilie of the First Rank 禮烈親王 (1636–1648)	Huangtaiji 皇太極 (1592–1643)
Sahaliyan 薩哈璘 (1604–1636); Prince Yingyi of the First Rank 穎毅親王 (posthumously awarded)	Qing dynasty emperors
Adali 阿達禮 (1624–1643); Prince Ying of the First Rank 穎親王 (1636–1643)

== See also ==
- Royal and noble ranks of the Qing dynasty
