= Yolo (prince) =

- Prince An of the First Rank

Head of the House of Prince An peerage
- Reign: 1651 – 1654
- Predecessor: Abatai (as Prince Raoyu)
- Successor: Marhun
- Born: 19 October 1625 天命十年乙丑九月十九日午時; Beijing, Forbidden City
- Died: 5 March 1689 (aged 63) 康熙二十八年己巳二月二十四日戌時
- Consorts: Lady Borijit; Lady Nara; Lady Heseri
- Issue: See § Family
Names
- Aisin Gioro Yolo (愛新覺羅 岳樂)
Posthumous name
- Prince Anhe of the Second Rank (安和親王)
- House: Aisin Gioro
- Father: Abatai
- Mother: Primary consort, of the Nara clan

Yolo

Prince Anhe
- Traditional Chinese: 安和親王
- Simplified Chinese: 安和亲王
Transcriptions
Standard Mandarin
- Hanyu Pinyin: Ānhé Qīnwáng

Yolo (Manchu: ᠶᠣᠯ; Chinese: 岳樂; 19 October 1625 – 15 March 1689), formally known as Prince An, was a Qing Dynasty imperial prince and Nurhaci's grandson. He was the fourth son of Abatai, Prince Raoyu.

== Life ==
Yolo was born on 19 October 1625 in the city of Beijing to Abatai, Prince Raoyu, and Princess Consort Raoyu, of the Nara clan.

Yolo joined in the army led by his cousin, Hooge, as Prince of the Fifth Rank.He followed his uncle Ajige, to suppress a local uprising in 1648.

In 1649, Yolo was promoted to Prince of the Third Rank. In 1651, inherited his father's princedom, and became Prince An of the Second Rank. During Shunzi reign, he was entrusted with the command of an army sent to force the submission of Outer Mongolia, and became presiding controller of the Imperial Clan Courtin 1655.

In 1671, during Kangxi reign, he helped in recovery of Kangsi Province and others cities from the occupation of General Wu Sangui's army and has made significant contributions during Revolt of the Three Feudatories.

== Family ==
Parents:

- Father: Abatai, Prince Raoyu of the Second Rank
- Mother: Primary consort, of the Nara clan (嫡福晉 那拉氏)

Primary Consort

- Primary Consort, of the Khorchin Borjigit clan (嫡福晋博尔济吉特氏)
  - Tatahai (他塔海; 13 May 1643 – 20 November 1651), first son
  - Desu (德素; 1 May 1644 –21 November 1651), second son
  - First Daughter (20 November 1643 – May 1649)
  - Adahai (阿达海; 13 April 1646 – 20 December 1646), third son
- Primary Consort, of the Nara clan (继福晋纳喇氏)
  - Princess Roujia of the Second Rank (和硕柔嘉公主; 6 May 1652 － 12 July 1673), second daughter
    - Married Geng Juzhong, the third son of Geng Jimao, and had issue (a daughter)
- Primary Consort, of the Heseri clan (三继福晋赫舍里氏)
  - Mani (玛尼; 11 September 1662 – 4 October 1664), fourteenth son
  - Ma’erhun (安慤郡王 玛尔珲; 29 November 1663 – 11 November 1709), Prince An of the Second Rank, fifteenth son
  - Princess of the Third Rank (郡主; b.12 February 1664), eleventh daughter
    - married Naige (奈格) of the Nara clan in 1679
  - Thirteenth daughter (13 December 1665 – 23 July 1684)
  - Princess of the Fourth Rank (县主; b. 3 April 1667), fifteenth daughter
    - married Prince of the Third Rank Erdemutu (额尔德穆图) of the Ulanghan cla (吴喇汉氏)in 1682
  - Jiangxi (奉恩镇国公 景熙; 21 March 1668 –5 August 1717), Duke of the First Rank, seventeenth son
  - Yunduan (勤郡王 蕴端; 21 December 1670 – 24 March 1704), Prince Qin of the Second Rank, eighteenth son
  - Eighteenth Daughter (22 June 1669 – June 1671)
  - Princess of the Fourth Rank (县主;b. 21 December 1670) nineteenth daughter
    - married Xinahai (席纳海) of the Nara clan in 1685
  - Yunduan (勤郡王 蕴端; 21 December 1671 – 24 March 1704), Prince Qin of the Second Rank, eighteenth son
  - Wuerzhan (固山贝子 务尔占; 23 September 1672 – 17 January 1724), Prince of the Fourth Rank, nineteenth son
  - Twenty-Second Daughter (19 November 1674 – February 1675)
  - Zanzha (赞扎; 1 March 1673 – 4 April 1674), twentieth son
  - Princess of the Fourth Rank (县主; b. 4 June 1683), twenty-third daughter
    - married Shiming (侍明) of the Guwalgiya clan 1698

Secondary Consort

- Secondary Consort, of the Ulahan Jermen clan (侧福晋吴喇汉哲尔门氏)
  - Fourth daughter (23 September 1653 – May 1664)
  - Fifth daughter (13 March 1658 – April 1658)
  - Princess of the Third Rank (郡主; 30 August 1659 – 1684) seventh daughter
    - Married Mingshang (明尚) of the Gorolo clan in 1674 and had issue (a daughter)
  - Seventeenth Daughter (6 June 1669 – 20 September 1682)
- Secondary Consort, of the Wulianghai Gilmot clan (侧福晋乌亮海济尔莫特氏)
  - Bunai (布乃; 12 September 1661 – 2r April 1662), twelfth son

Concubine

- Mistress, of the Liu clan (庶福晋刘氏)
  - Third Daughter (b.3 July 1653)
    - Married Changbao (常保) of the Nara clan in 1668
  - Qingsheng (青盛; 24 February 1658 – 26 November 1660), sixth son
  - Sixth daughter (b.15 February 1659)
    - married Naihun (鼐浑) of the Irgen Gioro clan in 1674
  - Sengbao (僧保; 26 November 1661 – 24 February 1668), thirteenth son
- Mistress, of the Bian clan (庶福晋卞氏)
  - Ayuxi (阿裕锡; 17 November 1658 –5 May 1660), fourth son
- Mistress, of the Zhou Clan (庶福晋周氏)
  - Abida (阿弼达; 24 November 1656 – 11 March 1658), fifth son
  - Yatu (雅图; 16 May 1659 – 7 March 1661), ninth son
  - Sixteenth Daughter (b.12 February 1668)
    - married Mucai (穆采) of the Nara clan in 1683)
  - Twentieth Daughter (13 February 1674 – January 1677)
- Mistress, of the Borijin clan
  - Tulansai (图兰塞; 3 March 1658 – 27 October 1660), seventh son
  - Tenth son (6 July 1660 – 29 August 1661)
  - Tenth daughter (7 September 1663 – February 1667)
- Mistress, of the Zhang clan (庶福晋张氏)
  - Sailenge (塞楞额 輔國將軍; 2 December 1658 – 24 July 1699), General of the Second Rank, eight son
  - Aizi (艾滋; 13 August 1660 – 12 April 1661), eleventh son
  - Saibuli (辅国将军 塞布礼;25 May 1664 – 7 March 1721), General of the Second Rank, sixteenth son
  - Twelfth daughter (18 September 1665 – December 1667)
- Mistress, of the Nara clan (庶福晋纳喇氏)
  - Ninth daughter (27 April 1660 – February 1662)
- Mistress, of the Zhan clan (媵妾詹氏)
  - Eighth Daughter (17 October 1659 – 18 February 1652)
- Mistress, of the Yu clan (媵妾俞氏)
  - Fourteenth daughter (13 September 1666 – 6 November 1668)
- Mistress, of the Zhang clan (媵妾张氏)
  - Twenty-first Daughter (29 March 1674 – 22 June 1684)

== See also ==
- Royal and noble ranks of the Qing dynasty
- Ranks of Imperial Consorts in China#Qing
