= Bolo, Prince Duanzhong =

Bolo
- Prince Duanzhong of the First Rank 和碩端重親王

Head of the House of Prince Duanzhong peerage
- Tenure: 1636–1652
- Predecessor: peerage created
- Successor: Qikexin
- Born: 1613
- Died: 23 April 1652 (aged 38–39)
- Spouse: Yi Ae-suk, Princess Uisun
Names
- Aisin Gioro Bolo (愛新覺羅 博洛)
Posthumous name
- Prince Duanzhongding of the First Rank (端重定親王)
- House: Aisin Gioro
- Father: Abatai
- Mother: Lady Nara

Bolo
- Chinese: 博洛
Transcriptions
Standard Mandarin
- Hanyu Pinyin: Bóluò

Bolo (Manchu: ᠪᠣᠯᠣ Bolo; 1613 – 23 April 1652), formally known as Prince Duanzhong, was a Manchu prince of the Qing dynasty. He was born in the Aisin Gioro clan, the imperial clan of the Qing dynasty, as the third son of Abatai.

== Life ==
Bolo was conferred the title of a beizi (fourth-rank prince) in 1636 and took part in the campaigns against the Mongols, Chinese, and Koreans.

In 1644, Bolo followed Dorgon to Beijing. He accompanied Dodo in pursuit of Li Zicheng, and was promoted to the status of a beile (third-rank prince) for his achievement. In 1645, he followed Dodo to Nanjing where he was given command of half the army to pacify nearby cities. He succeeded in taking Changzhou, Suzhou, and Hangzhou, but returned to Beijing late the same year. In 1646, he was again sent to Zhejiang, this time as commander-in-chief of the Qing troops with the title "Great General Who Pacifies the South" (平南大將軍). His aim was to conquer Zhejiang and Fujian and this he accomplished in 1646. From Fujian he sent a detachment south, which took Guangzhou from remaining Southern Ming forces early in 1647.

On his triumphal return to Beijing, Bolo was promoted to a junwang (second-rank prince) and given the title "Prince Duanzhong of the Second Rank". In 1648, he and Ajige were commissioned to inquire into the situation in Mongolia, however a rebellion broke out simultaneously in Datong, Shanxi, and both laid siege to the city to quell the rebellion. When Dorgon personally conducted the siege of Datong in 1649 he promoted Bolo to the status of a qinwang (first-rank prince), and placed him in command of an expedition to suppress another uprising in Shanxi. After those who were rebelling were subdued late in 1649, Bolo returned to Beijing. The following year he was entrusted with the supervision of the Six Boards of the central government but was soon demoted to the status of a junwang for failing to inform against the president of a Board, who had disobeyed orders. Early in 1651, he was reinstated as a qinwang. He and the princes Nikan and Mandahai were trusted by Dorgon and were left in power after the latter died. Before long, however, Bolo aligned himself with the princes who had opposed Dorgon. Later he was once more demoted to junwang, this time for failure to report that Ajige, then in prison, was in possession of weapons. Eventually, his rank of a qinwang was restored to him. After Dorgon's death in 1650, Bolo married one of his consorts, the Korean princess Yi Ae-suk. After his death in 1652, he was granted the posthumous name Ding (定), and his title was passed on to one of his sons. But when it was disclosed that Bolo while living had appropriated for his own use property which had belonged to Dorgon, he was posthumously deprived of all honours, and his descendants were also deprived of their ranks in 1659.

A small work written in 1673, entitled Guoxu Zhi (過墟志), tells the story of a Manchu prince who engaged in the conquest of south China, and married a Chinese widow surnamed Liu (劉). This work did not disclosed the name of the prince in question, but according to internal evidence, some historians believe Bolo is the prince described in the work.

== See also ==
- Royal and noble ranks of the Qing dynasty
- Ranks of imperial consorts in China#Qing

== Suggested readings ==
- Hummel, Arthur W. Sr., ed. (1943). "Bolo" . Eminent Chinese of the Ch'ing Period. United States Government Printing Office.
