= Prince Qin =

Qing dynasty princely peer

Prince Qin of the Second Rank
- Chinese: 勤郡王
Transcriptions
Standard Mandarin
- Hanyu Pinyin: qín jùnwáng

Prince Qin of the Second Rank, or simply Prince Qin, was the title of a princely peerage used in China during the Manchu-led Qing dynasty (1644–1912). As the Prince Qin peerage was not awarded "iron-cap" status, this meant that each successive bearer of the title would normally start off with a title downgraded by one rank vis-à-vis that held by his predecessor. The peerage was created in 1684 for Yunduan, Nurhaci's great-grandson and son of Yolo, Prince An of the Second Rank.

== Members of the Prince Qin peerage ==
- Yunduan (1671-1705), Yolo's son, initially created a junwang in 1684 under the title "Prince Qin of the Second Rank". In 1690, he was demoted to a beizi and stripped of his title in 1698.

=== Family tree ===
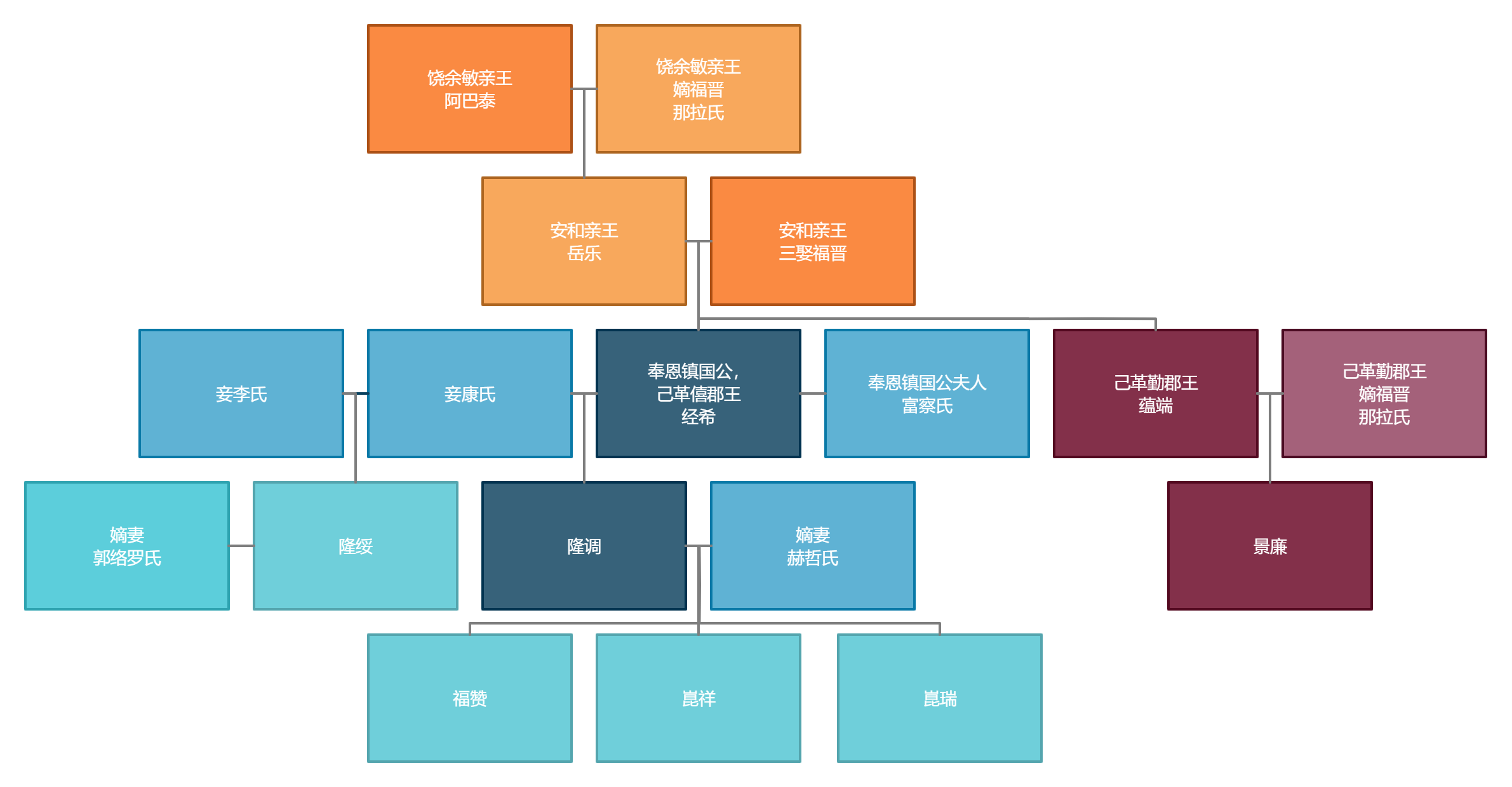
Prince Qin peerage is marked with purple
