= Feng'en fuguo gong =

Feng'en fuguo gong (Chinese: 奉恩輔國公, Manchu: ᡴᡝᠰᡳ ᠪᡝᡨᡠᠸᠠᡴᡳᠶᠠᡵᠠᡤᡠᡵᡠᠨ ᡩᡝᠠᡳᠰᡳᠯᠠᡵᠠᡤᡠᠩ, romanized: kesi-be tuwakiyara gurun-be aisilara gung, Mongolian: Хишигийг сахих улсад туслагч гүн), translated as "Grace Bulwark Duke" or "Duke Who Assists to the State by the Grace" or "State Duke of the Second Rank", was one of the royal and noble titles of the Qing dynasty. A title was created in 1653 by division of the zhenguo gong title into two ranks following the criterion of sharing Eight Privileges. The title was the eighth highest rank in the extended system of ranks and the fifth inheritable rank.

== Rules of grant ==
The title was the lowest possible to inherit in the peerage of the second rank except of special circumstances. The title could also convey a honorifical name consisting of two characters. The title could be made perpetually inheritable in case of abolition of the peerage.

The title could be granted to the son of Feng'en zhenguo gong born to State Duchess of the First Rank.

== Family members ==
=== Princess consort ===
Princess consort was styled as "feng'en fuguo gong furen" (奉恩輔國公夫人), which translates to "State Duchess of the Second Rank". Often the title was replaced by the term Primary Wife (嫡妻).

=== Sons ===
Son of feng'en fuguo gong was granted a title of third class bulwark general. As the title was the last possible for the peerage, the right to inherit the title of Duke of the Second Rank was reserved to the sons born to primary consorts. However, the title son inherited could convey different honorifical name in case when father's title had been given honorifical name. De facto sons born to secondary consorts of the feng'en fuguo duke received various official positions and became unranked imperial clansmen.

=== Daughters ===
Daughter born to primary consort of feng'en zhenguo duke was granted a title of Lady of the Third Rank (乡君). Daughters born to secondary consort of feng'en fuguo gong were granted a title of sixth rank clanswoman.

== Allowances and court attire ==
=== Feng'en zhenguo gong ===
==== Allowance ====
The allowance of grace bulwark duke reached 500 taels of silver and 500 hu of rice.

==== Attire ====
- Mandarin hat with ruby-inlaid finial decorated with two dragons and 4 pearls (winter) or 1 turquoise and 1 pearl (summer) and two-eyed peacock feathers
- Court dress befitting prince of the third rank
- Surcoat befitting grace defender duke
- Fur coat befitting grace defender duke

=== State duchess of the second rank ===
==== Attire ====
- Crown decorated with 3 peacocks each embellished with three pearls, finial with 4 pearls and ruby and 3 strings of pearls connected with two lapis lazuli inlaid plaques
- Diadem decorated with 4 ruyi cloud shaped plaques bejeweled with pearls and 3 strings of pearls connected with two lapis lazuli inlaid plaques
- Formal and semiformal robes befitting princess consort of the third rank
- Surcoat befitting state duchess of the first rank

=== Xiangjun ===
==== Allowance ====
The basic allotment of xiangjun reached 40 taels and 40 hu of rice. As most of the ladies of the third rank were married off, the allowance included 40 taels and 5 rolls of fabrics. Xiangjun was allowed to have 4 personal maids and 2 bodyguards.

==== Attire ====
- Crown and diadem befitting state duchess of the second rank
- Court robes befitting princess consort of the third rank
- Semiformal robes befitting state duchess of the first rank

== Notable titles ==
The following table includes the titles conveying honorifical names. The table is constructed chronologically.

Year	Title	Recipient	Background	Peerage	References
1635	Grace Bulwark Gangyi Duke (奉恩輔國剛毅公)	Darca (達爾察)	Son of Murhaci and lady Magiya	Line of Murhaci	
1652	Grace Bulwark Huaisi duke (奉恩輔國懷思公)	Songbutu (嵩布圖)	Son of Handai and lady Nara	Line of Murhaci	
1653	Grace Bulwark Duke Quehou (奉恩輔國悫厚公)	Tabai (塔拜)	Son of Nurhaci and lady Niohuru	Line of Tabai	
1655	Grace Bulwark Duke Quehou (奉恩輔國悫厚公)	Hailan (海蘭)	Son of Handai and lady Nara	Line of Murhaci	
1673	Grace Bulwark Duke Quehou (奉恩輔國悫厚公)	Muqing (穆青)	Son of Darca and lady Ula Nara	Line of Murhaci	
1653	Grace Bulwark Duke Jiezhi (奉恩輔國介直公)	Laimbu	Son of Nurhaci and lady Sirin Gioro	Line of Laimbu	
1655	Grace Bulwark Daomin Duke (奉恩輔國悼愍公)	Xibuxilun (席布錫倫)	Son of Handai and lady Nara	Line of Murhaci	
1660	Grace Bulwark Duke Kexi (奉恩輔國恪僖公)	Baduhai (拔都海)	Sixth son of Tabai and lady Usun	Line of Tabai	
1660	Grace Bulwark Duke Kexi (奉恩輔國恪僖公)	Lashita (喇世塔)	Tenth son of Murhaci and lady Ayan Gioro	Line of Murhaci	
1681	Grace Bulwark Duke Kexi (奉恩輔國恪僖公)	Cani (察尼)	Fourth son of Dodo, Prince Yutong of the First Rank and secondary princess consort, lady Tunggiya	Prince Yu (豫)	
1750	Grace Bulwark Duke Kexi (奉恩輔國恪僖公)	Hongyan (弘曣)	Sixth son of Yunreng and secondary crown princess consort, lady Tanggiya	Prince Li (理)	
XVIII century	Grace Bulwark Dunqin Duke (奉恩輔國敦勤公)	Aiyintu (愛音圖)	First son of Ertu (額爾圖) and lady Daigiya	Line of Surhaci	
1787	Grace Bulwark Keqin Duke (奉恩輔國恪勤公)	Yongwei (永琟)	First son of Hongyan and secondary consort, lady Wanyan	Prince Li (理)	
