= Prince Xi =

Qing dynasty peerage

Prince Xi of the Second Rank (僖郡王) was a Qing dynasty princely peerage. The peerage was created in 1682 for Jingxi, Nurhacii's great-grandson and 17th son of Prince An of the Second Rank Yolo. As the peerage was not granted perpetual inheritability, each successive bearer held diminished ranks vis-a-vis his predecessor.

== Prince Xi of the Second Rank ==
- 1682－1717：Grace defender duke Jingxi. Jingxi was granted a title of prince of the second rank with the honorific name "Xi" and demoted to grace defender duke in 1690.

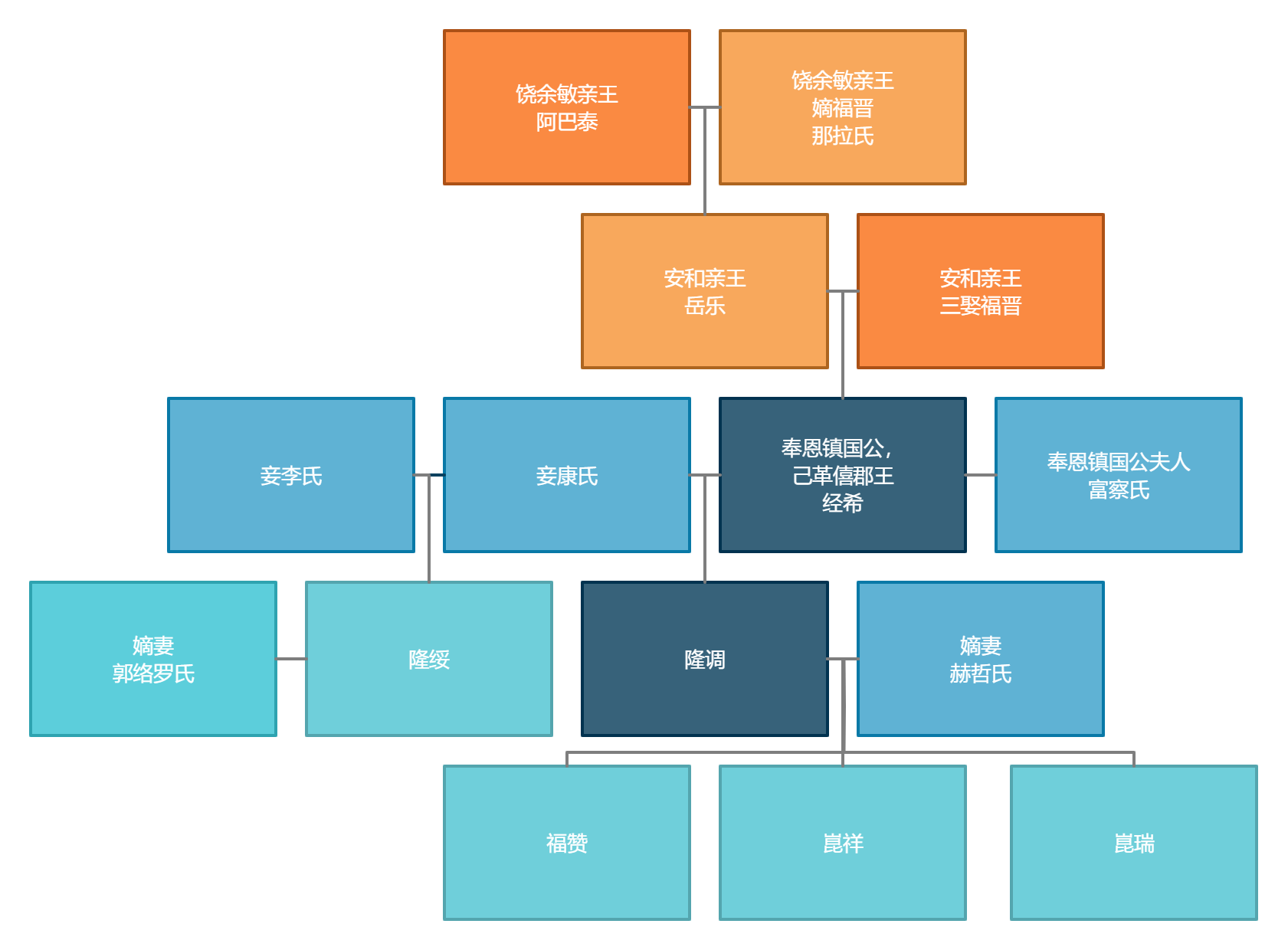
Family tree of Prince Xi
