= Yoto (prince) =

- Prince Cheng of the First Rank 和碩成親王

Head of the House of Prince Keqin peerage
- Predecessor: peerage created
- Successor: Lolohun (as Prince Yanxi of the Second Rank)
- Born: 26 February 1599
- Died: 11 February 1639 (aged 39); Jinan
- Spouse: Lady Nara, Lady Hada Nara
- Issue: Lolohun, Karcuhun, Basiha, Huilbu
- Father: Daišan
- Mother: Lady Ligiya

Yoto (Manchu: ᠶᠣᡨ᠋ᠣ; Chinese: 岳託; 26 February 1599 – 11 February 1639) was a Qing dynasty imperial prince and Nurhaci's grandson. Yoto became the first bearer of the Prince Keqin peerage as Prince Cheng of the First Rank. He was demoted two ranks for committing a grave offence and posthumously granted a title of Prince Keqin of the Second Rank. After his death, the peerage was twice renamed until 1778, when the peerage was granted iron-cap status, which meant that each successive bearer of the title would hold undiminished title vis-a-vis his predecessor.

== Life ==
Yoto was born on 26 February 1599 as Daišan's eldest son. His mother was primary consort, lady Ligiya. He was raised by his grandfather since young and became a member of Bordered Red Banner at the age of 7. In 1621, he and Degelei stopped an attack of Ming forces led by Li Bingcheng, causing their return to Baitapu.Later on, an ambassador of Khalkha Jarud tribes was killed during his way to Yehe valley. In 1626, he was awarded a title of third-ranking prince (beile) for conquering Khakha together with Abatai and Degelei. In 1627, he participated in Later Jin invasion of Joseon together with Amin and Jirgalang. He was responsible for signature of separatistic peace treaty with king of Joseon, which resulted in pillaging of Pyongyang by Amin. In 1631, when Six Ministries were established by Hong Taiji, Yoto was tasked with overseeing the Ministry of War. Yoto was the main architect behind the mobilisation of Han Chinese people to Eight Banners by requesting Hong Taiji to properly take care of Han people. Yoto fell ill after the invasion of Shanxi. However, he consolidated Qing power over Tumed and Khalkha after ambushing Galdan Boshoktu Khan's forces and signing a peace treaty with indigenous leaders. In 1636, Yoto was granted the title of Prince Cheng of the First Rank (成亲王, 'cheng' meaning 'accomplished, perfect'). Yoto was demoted to the third-ranking prince shortly after being sentenced by the council of princes to death. Nonetheless, Hong Taiji didn't revoke a decree appointing Yoto as the Minister of War and delayed his execution. The demotion of Yoto affected his relationship with Daišan. In 1637, Yoto was demoted to the Prince of the Fourth Rank for absence at the court session. He was restored as beile in the next year. In 1639, when Dorgon led conquest of Shenjing, Hong Taiji asked about Yoto. On 11 February 1639, Yoto died in Jinan.

== Family ==
Yoto's second primary consort was lady Hada Nara, daughter of Urgudai and Mangguji, Nurhaci's third daughter by Fuca Gundei. Some sources claim that the marriage was planned by Manggūltai as the rehabilitation of his crimes. He was succeeded by the eldest son Lolohun.

- Princess Consort, of the Nara clan
  - Lolohun, Prince Yanxijie of the Second Rank (多罗衍禧介郡王 罗洛浑;1 April 1623 – 11 September 1646), first son
  - Karcuhun, Prince Xianrong of the Third Rank (多罗显荣贝勒 喀尔楚浑), third son
  - Basiha, Duke of the Second Rank (辅国恪思公 巴思哈), fifth son
  - Hulibu, General of the First Rank (鎮國將軍 呼里布), sixth son
  - Princess of the Second Rank (和硕公主; 1615-1637), first daughter
    - Married Manzhuxili of the Khorchin Borjigin clan in 1628
  - Second daughter
    - Married Bilaxi of the Borjigin clan
  - Third daughter
    - Married Prince of the Fourth Rank Seling of the Barin Borjigin clan
- Princess Consort, of the Hada Nara clan
  - Baruchun, Prince Hehui of the Third Rank (多罗和惠贝勒 巴尔楚浑)
  - Sixth daughter
    - Married Darhan Joliketu Badun of the Khorchin Borjigin clan and had issue (one daughter: Princess Consort Pingbi of the Second Rank).
