= Abatai =

- Prince Raoyu of the Second Rank

Head of the House of Prince Raoyu peerage
- Reign: 1644–1646
- Successor: Yolo (Prince An)
- Born: 27 July 1589
- Died: 10 May 1646 (aged 56)
- Consorts: Lady Nara
- Issue: Šanggiyan; Bohoto; Bolo, Prince Duanzhongding of the First Rank; Yolo, Prince Anhe of the First Rank; Hedu
Names
- Aisin Gioro Abatai (愛新覺羅 阿巴泰)
Posthumous name
- Prince Raoyumin of the Second Rank
- House: Aisin Gioro
- Father: Nurhaci
- Mother: Lady Irgen Gioro

Abatai
- Chinese: 阿巴泰
Transcriptions
Standard Mandarin
- Hanyu Pinyin: Ābātài

Prince Raoyu
- Traditional Chinese: 饒餘郡王
- Simplified Chinese: 饶余郡王
Transcriptions
Standard Mandarin
- Hanyu Pinyin: Ráoyù Jùnwáng

Abatai (Manchu:; 27 July 1589 – 10 May 1646) was a Manchu prince and military general of the early Qing dynasty. Although an inconsistent and dissolute malcontent, he nevertheless showed considerable ability as a military leader and administrator.

== Life ==
Abatai was born in the Manchu Aisin Gioro clan, the imperial clan of the Qing dynasty, as part of the Plain Blue Banner. He was the seventh son of Nurhaci, the khan of the Later Jin dynasty, the precursor of the Qing dynasty. His mother, who was from the Irgen Gioro (伊爾根覺羅) clan, was a concubine of Nurhaci.

Abatai led Later Jin forces to attack the tribes of Weji in 1611 and those of Jarut in 1623. He was disciplined for abandoning his colleagues during a raid on territories of the Ming Empire in 1629. He was also held responsible for the loss of Yongping and other conquered Ming cities in 1629 and 1630.

In 1631, Abatai was appointed to the Manchu Board of Works. He was reprimanded for incompetence at the siege of Dalian in 1633 but reformed his conduct, and with his younger half-brother Ajige, he reputedly fought and won 56 engagements. He was handsomely rewarded in 1636 for his achievements in battle.

In 1641, Abatai was stripped of his ranks for withdrawing without permission during the siege of Jinzhou in 1641. He then led a raiding force into northern China, advancing into Zhili, Shandong and Jiangsu from 1642 to 1643.

In 1644, Abatai was granted the title "Prince Raoyu of the Second Rank" (饒餘郡王), and in the following year he was placed in command of the military in Shandong. He died in 1646.

== Family ==
Primary Consort

- Primary consort, of the Nara clan (嫡福晉 那拉氏)
  - First daughter (1604–1629)
    - Married Li Yongfang (李永芳; d. 1634) in 1618
  - Princess of the Fourth Rank (縣主; 1605–1676), second daughter
  - Šanggiyan, Prince Xianque of the Fourth Rank (賢愨貝子 尚建; 27 October 1606 – 5 September 1630), first son
  - Bohoto, Prince Wenliang of the Fourth Rank (溫良貝子 博和讬; 17 February 1610 – 11 November 1648), second son
  - Princess of the Fourth Rank (縣主; 1611–1648), third daughter
  - Bolo, Prince Duanzhongding of the First Rank (端重定親王 博洛; 23 April 1613 – 23 April 1652), third son
  - Princess of the Fourth Rank (縣主; 1614–1669), fourth daughter
  - Lady of the First Rank (郡君; 1617–1673), fifth daughter
  - Sixth daughter (1620–1645)
  - Princess of the Fourth Rank (縣主; 1621–1669)
    - Married Chuo'erji (綽爾濟; d. 1670) of the Khorchin Borjigit clan, and had issue (Empress Xiaohuizhang)
  - Yolo, Prince Anhe of the First Rank (安和親王 岳樂; 19 October 1625 – 15 March 1689), fourth son

Secondary Consort

- Secondary consort, of the Borjigit clan (側福晉 博爾濟吉特氏)
  - Kongguli (孔古理; 1 June 1639 – 13 February 1649), fifth son

Concubine

- Mistress, of the Mangnot clan (莽诺特氏)
- Mistress, of the Gongginat clan (公吉纳特氏)
- Mistress, of the Ulanghaigimot clan (乌亮海济摸特氏)

== Ancestry ==
Giocangga (1526–1583)
Taksi (1543–1583)
Empress Yi
Nurhaci (1559–1626)
Agu
Empress Xuan (d. 1569)
Abatai (1589–1646)
Zhaqin
Lady Irgen Gioro

== See also ==
- Royal and noble ranks of the Qing dynasty
- Ranks of Imperial Consorts in China#Qing
