= Daišan =

Qing dynasty prince and statesman (1583–1648)

- Prince Li of the First Rank
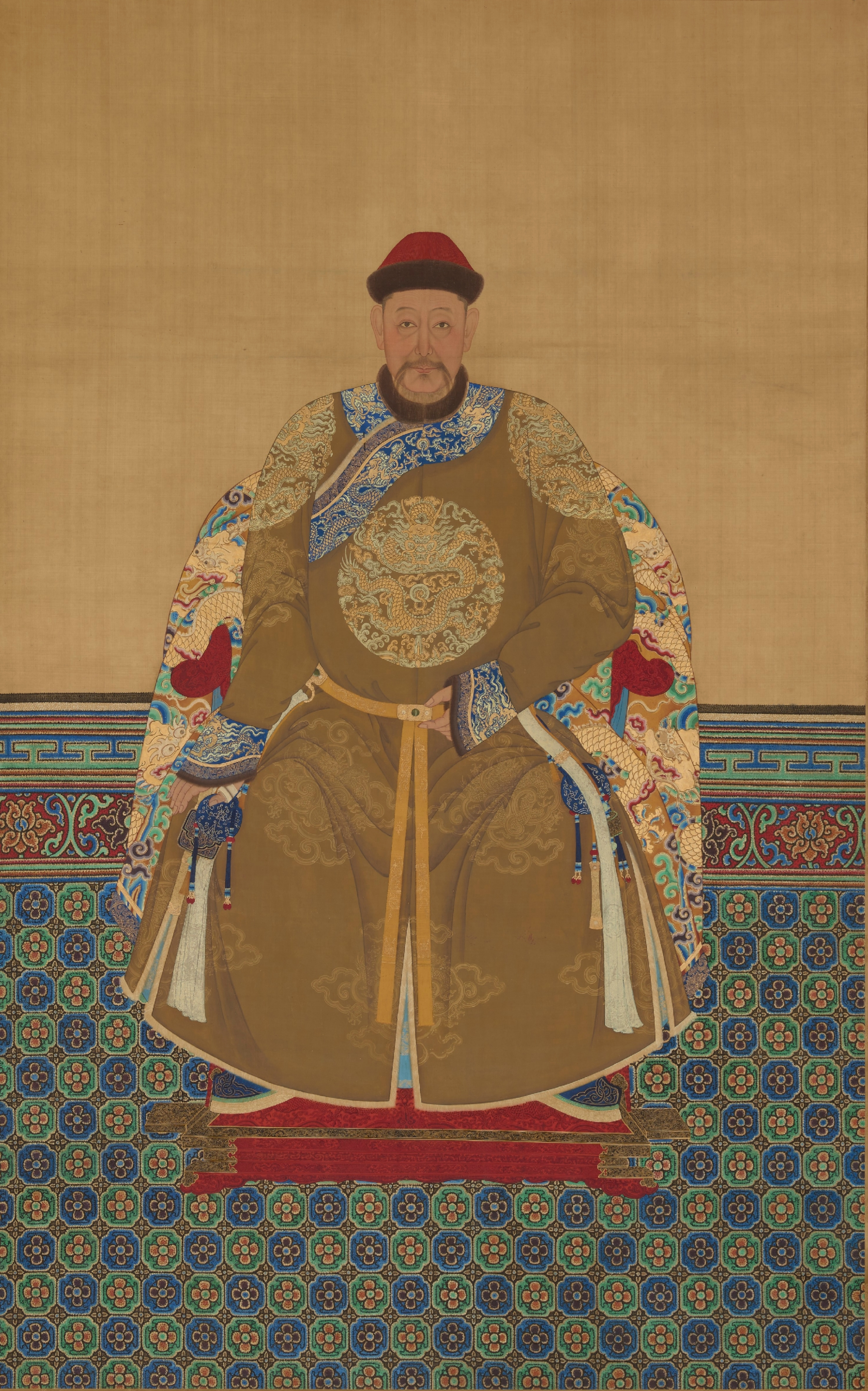
- Portrait of Daišan by an unknown Qing dynasty painter

Prince Li of the First Rank
- Reign: 1636–1648
- Predecessor: None
- Successor: Mandahai
- Born: 19 August 1583
- Died: 25 November 1648 (aged 65); Beijing, Qing China
- Consorts: Lady Ligiya; Lady Yehe Nara; Yehe Nara Subenzhu
- Issue: Yoto, Prince Keqin of the Second Rank; Šoto; Sahaliyan, Prince Yingyi of the First Rank; Wakda, Prince Qianxiang of the Second Rank; Balama; Majan; Mandahai, Prince Xunjian of the First Rank; Hūse
Names
- Aisin Gioro Daišan (愛新覺羅 代善)
Posthumous name
- Prince Lilie of the First Rank (禮烈親王)
- House: Aisin Gioro
- Father: Nurhaci
- Mother: Tunggiya Hahana Jacing

Daišan
- Chinese: 代善
Transcriptions
Standard Mandarin
- Hanyu Pinyin: Dàishàn

Daišan (Manchu:; 19 August 1583 – 25 November 1648) was an influential Manchu prince and statesman of the Qing dynasty.

== Family background ==
Daišan was born in the Manchu Aisin Gioro clan as the second son of Nurhaci, the founder of the Qing dynasty. His mother was Nurhaci's first consort, Lady Tunggiya (佟佳氏). He was an older half-brother of Nurhaci's successor, Hong Taiji.

== Career ==
=== Nurhaci's reign ===
During Nurhaci's campaign against the Ula clan and its beile Bujantai in 1607, Daišan distinguished himself on the battlefield by assisting Šurhaci and Cuyen. For his efforts, he was granted the title of "Guyen Baturu" (Chinese: 古英巴圖魯) (literally: "exploring hero").

In 1613, Daišan again distinguished himself on the battlefield in Nurhaci's campaign against the Ula clan.

In 1616, when Nurhaci declared himself khan and established the Later Jin dynasty, Daišan was the first selected as beile of a special rank by Nurhaci to assist in administration. These four beile would be known as the Four Senior Beiles the other places being filled by Amin, Manggūltai, and Hong Taiji .

From 1618, when the campaign against the Ming dynasty began with the pronouncement of the Seven Grievances by Nurhaci, until 1622 Daišan was a leading general and as captain of the Plain Red Banner of the Eight Banners, played an important role in the capture of Fushun in 1618, in the victory at the Battle of Sarhū in 1619, and in the occupation of Shenyang in 1621. Starting in 1621 Daišan and the other three senior beiles served as assistants to Nurhaci on a monthly rotational basis in directing state affairs of the Later Jin dynasty.

=== Hong Taiji's reign ===
After the death of Nurhaci at the Battle of Ningyuan in 1626, Daišan was able to use his influence to make the princes and generals come to an agreement on Hong Taiji's accession as khan. However even though Hong Taiji had become khan, Daišan, along with Manggūltai and Amin continued to take turns as assistant administrators until 1629 as Hong Taiji began to consolidate power.

Between 1629 and 1634, Daišan took part in most of the campaigns of Hong Taiji against the Ming dynasty. In 1636, Hong Taiji declared himself emperor and renamed the Later Jin dynasty to "Qing dynasty". Daišan was conferred the title of "Prince Li of the First Rank" (和碩禮親王) and an additional title of "Elder Brother" (兄).

=== Shunzhi Emperor's reign ===
In 1643, Hong Taiji died and a successor was not named. At first, Daišan named Hong Taiji's eldest son Hooge as the heir, but the latter declined the offer to succeed his father. Ajige and Dodo wanted Dorgon to take the throne, but Dorgon declined on the grounds that acceptance would be an act of disloyalty to the late emperor, who raised him. The issue was finally settled when many generals who followed Hong Taiji into battle declared that they wanted one of Hong Taiji's sons on the throne. As such, Hong Taiji's ninth son Fulin (the future Shunzhi Emperor), then at the age of six, was proclaimed emperor, with Dorgon and Jirgalang acting as co-regents. Yet even after the entire Qing court had sworn an oath of allegiance to the throne, and there was a conspiracy by some nobles to let Dorgon replace Fulin. Daišan settled the dispute by supporting Fulin and exposing the conspirators, which included his own son Šoto and his grandson Adali (eldest son of Sahaliyen). Dorgon and Daišan had them both executed.

=== Death and legacy ===
According to historical records, it seemed that Daišan never attempted to seize power for himself, and instead worked for the benefits of the Aisin Gioro clan. In 1643, he led a council of princes to appoint Jirgalang and Dorgon as co-regents for the Shunzhi Emperor. In 1644, he followed Dorgon to Beijing, where he died four years later.

At the time of his death, special posthumous honours were not awarded to him, except that the sum of 10,000 taels instead of the usual 5,000 was given to his family for his funeral and a memorial tablet was erected. Later emperors of the Qing dynasty would come to recognise and appreciate the work he did for the dynasty and the imperial clan. The Kangxi Emperor awarded Daišan a posthumous name, "Lie" (烈), in 1671. In 1754, the Qianlong Emperor ordered that Daišan be given a place in the Temple of Princes at Mukden and in 1778, lauded him and Jirgalang, Dorgon, Hooge and Yoto for their illustrious accomplishments in the early days of the dynasty and ordered that their names be listed in the Imperial Ancestral Temple.

At the same time the titles of these five, as well as those of Dodo, Šurhaci, and Lekedehun, were given rights of perpetual inheritance. The designation of Daišan's title, which, after his death, had been twice altered under his son Mandahai and grandson Giyesu, was then restored to Prince Li, and the inheritor ranked higher in court ceremonies than any other prince.

Daišan had a total of eight sons. The seventh, Mandahai, inherited the rank of Prince of the First Rank, which was passed to his son. However, in 1659 the princedom was taken from Mandahai's descendants and given to Daišan's grandson, Giyesu, whose descendants held it until the fall of the Qing dynasty.

The eldest son, Yoto, was granted the title of "Prince Keqin of the Second Rank" (克勤郡王) and the third, Sahaliyen, held the rank of "Prince Ying of the First Rank" (穎親王). Sahaliyen's son, Lekedehun, was named "Prince Shuncheng of the Second Rank" (順承郡王) in 1648. Daišan's fourth son, Wakda, held the title of "Prince Qian of the Second Rank" (謙郡王). Wakda was canonised as Xiang (襄), but this title was not accorded the right of perpetual inheritance.

== Family ==
Primary Consort

- First primary consort, of the Ligiya clan (嫡福晉 李佳氏)
  - Yoto, Prince Keqin of the Second Rank (克勤郡王 岳託; 26 February 1599 – 11 February 1639), first son
  - Šoto, Prince of the Third Rank (貝勒 碩託; 15 December 1600 – 30 September 1643), second son
- Second primary consort, of the Yehe Nara clan (繼福晉 葉赫那拉氏)
  - Princess of the Third Rank (郡主; 14 December 1602 – 1649), first daughter
    - Married Heshuotu (和碩圖) of the Manchu Donggo clan in January/February 1615
  - Sahaliyan, Prince Yingyi of the First Rank (穎毅親王 薩哈璘; 19 June 1604 – 11 June 1636), third son
  - Wakda, Prince Qianxiang of the Second Rank (謙襄郡王 瓦克達; 17 June 1606 – 9 September 1652), fourth son
  - Balama (巴喇瑪; 16 March 1608 – 17 July 1631), fifth son
- Third primary consort, of the Yehe Nara clan (三娶福晉 葉赫那拉氏), personal name Subenzhu (蘇本珠)
  - Mandahai, Prince Xunjian of the First Rank (巽簡親王 滿達海; 30 April 1622 – 15 March 1652), seventh son
  - Princess of the Third Rank (郡主; 14 September 1624 – 1685), third daughter
    - Married Doulei (都类) of the Manchu Donggo clan in August/September 1640
  - Princess of the Third Rank (郡主; 1626–1646), fifth daughter
  - Hūse, Prince Huishun of the First Rank (惠順親王 祜塞; 3 March 1628 – 22 March 1646), eighth son

Secondary Consort

- Secondary consort, of the Hada Nara clan (側福晉 哈達那拉氏)
  - Majan, Duke of the Second Rank (輔國公 瑪佔; 9 August 1612 – 29 December 1638), sixth son
  - Seventh daughter (1629–1649)
- Secondary consort, of the Khalkha Borjigit clan (側福晉 喀爾喀博爾濟吉特氏)
  - Princess of the Third Rank (郡主; 20 June 1624 – 1650), second daughter
  - Fourth daughter (1625–1654)
  - Princess of the Third Rank (郡主; 1628–1649), sixth daughter
  - Princess of the Third Rank (郡主; 1629–1649), eighth daughter
  - Princess of the Third Rank (郡主; 1631–1673), ninth daughter
  - Princess of the Third Rank (郡主; 1638–1712), 11th daughter
  - Princess of the Third Rank (郡主; 1641–1666), 12th daughter

Concubine

- Mistress, of the Fuca clan (富察氏)
  - Tenth daughter (1638–1710)

== Ancestry ==
Fuman
Giocangga (1526–1583)
Empress Zhi
Taksi (1543–1583)
Empress Yi
Nurhaci (1559–1626)
Cancha
Agu
Empress Xuan (d. 1569)
Daišan (1583–1648)
Tamu
Hahana Jacing (1560–1592)

== See also ==
- Royal and noble ranks of the Qing dynasty
- Ranks of imperial consorts in China#Qing
