= Prince Keqin =

Prince Keqin of the Second Rank
- Traditional Chinese: 多羅克勤郡王
- Simplified Chinese: 多罗克勤郡王
Transcriptions
Standard Mandarin
- Hanyu Pinyin: duōluó kèqín jùnwáng
- Wade–Giles: to-lo k'o-ch'in chün-wang

Prince Cheng of the First Rank
- Traditional Chinese: 和碩成親王
- Simplified Chinese: 和硕成亲王
Transcriptions
Standard Mandarin
- Hanyu Pinyin: héshuò chéng qīnwáng
- Wade–Giles: ho-shuo ch'eng ch'in-wang

Prince Yanxi of the Second Rank
- Traditional Chinese: 多羅衍僖郡王
- Simplified Chinese: 多罗衍僖郡王
Transcriptions
Standard Mandarin
- Hanyu Pinyin: duōluó yánxī jùnwáng
- Wade–Giles: to-lo yen-hsi chün-wang

Prince Ping of the Second Rank
- Traditional Chinese: 多羅平郡王
- Simplified Chinese: 多罗平郡王
Transcriptions
Standard Mandarin
- Hanyu Pinyin: duōluó píng jùnwáng
- Wade–Giles: to-lo p'ing chün-wang

Prince Keqin of the Second Rank (Manchu: ᡩᠣᡵᠣᡳ
ᠪᠠᡥᠠᠮᡝ
ᡴᡳᠴᡝᠮᠪᡳ
ᡤᡳᠶᡡᠨ
ᠸᠠᠩ; doroi bahame kicembi giyūn wang), or simply Prince Keqin, was the title of a princely peerage used in China during the Manchu-led Qing dynasty (1644–1912). It was also one of the 12 "iron-cap" princely peerages in the Qing dynasty, which meant that the title could be passed down without being downgraded.

The first bearer of the title was Yoto (1599–1639), a grandson of Nurhaci, the founder of the Qing dynasty. In 1636, he was created "Prince Cheng of the First Rank" (Prince Cheng) by his uncle Huangtaiji, who succeeded Nurhaci as the ruler of the Qing Empire. However, he was subsequently demoted for committing offences. After his death, he was posthumously honoured as "Prince Keqin of the Second Rank". Yoto's son and successor, Luoluohun (died 1646), inherited the peerage as "Prince Yanxi of the Second Rank" (Prince Yanxi). The peerage was renamed again to "Prince Ping of the Second Rank" (Prince Ping) when it was passed on to Luoluohun's son, Luokeduo (died 1682).

During the reign of the Qianlong Emperor, the peerage was restored to its former name, "Prince Keqin of the Second Rank", and awarded "iron-cap" status. It was passed down over 13 generations and held by 17 persons – one as Prince Cheng, one as Prince Yanxi, six as Prince Ping, and nine as Prince Keqin.

== Members of the Prince Keqin / Prince Cheng / Prince Yanxi / Prince Ping peerage ==
Members of the Prince Keqin / Prince Cheng / Prince Yanxi / Prince Ping peerage
- Yoto (岳托; 1599–1639), Daišan's eldest son and Nurhaci's grandson, created Prince Cheng of the First Rank in 1636 but demoted in the same year to a beile, demoted further in 1637 to beizi but restored as a beile in 1638, posthumously honoured as Prince Keqin of the Second Rank in 1639
  - Luoluohun(羅洛渾; died 1646), Yoto's eldest son, held a beile title from 1639 to 1644, held the title Prince Yanxi of the Second Rank from 1644 to 1646, posthumously honoured as Prince Yanxijie of the Second Rank (衍僖介郡王)
    - Luokeduo (羅科鐸; died 1682), Luoluohun's eldest son, held the title Prince Yanxi of the Second Rank from 1646 to 1651, became Prince Ping of the Second Rank from 1651 to 1682, posthumously honoured as Prince Pingbi of the Second Rank (平比郡王)
      - Naertu (訥爾圖; 1665–1696), Luokeduo's fourth son, held the title Prince Ping of the Second Rank from 1683 to 1687, stripped of his title in 1687
      - Naerfu (訥爾福; died 1701), Luokeduo's sixth son, held a beizi title from 1685 to 1687, held the title Prince Ping of the Second Rank from 1687 to 1701, posthumously honoured as Prince Pingdao of the Second Rank (平悼郡王)
        - Naersu (訥爾蘇; died 1740), Naerfu's eldest son, held the title Prince Ping of the Second Rank from 1701 to 1726, stripped of his title in 1726
          - Fupeng (福彭; 1708–1748), Naersu's eldest son, held the title Prince Ping of the Second Rank from 1726 to 1748, posthumously honoured as Prince Pingmin of the Second Rank (平敏郡王)
            - Qingming (慶明; died 1750), Fupeng's son, held the title Prince Ping of the Second Rank from 1749 to 1750, posthumously honoured as Prince Pingxi of the Second Rank (平僖郡王)
          - Fuxiu (1710–1741), Naersu's son, held the title of a beizi
            - Qingheng (慶恆; died 1779), Fuxiu's son and Fupeng's adoptive son, held the title Prince Ping of the Second Rank from 1750 to 1778, became Prince Keqin of the Second Rank from 1778 to 1779, posthumously honoured as Prince Keqinliang of the Second Rank (克勤良郡王)
        - Naqing'e (訥清額; 1692–1765), Naertu's son, posthumously honoured as Prince Keqin of the Second Rank
          - Yalang'a (雅朗阿; died 1794), Naqing'e's son, held the title Prince Keqin of the Second Rank from 1780 to 1794, posthumously honoured as Prince Keqinzhuang of the Second Rank (克勤莊郡王)
            - Hengjin (恆謹), Yalang'a's son, held the title Prince Keqin of the Second Rank from 1795 to 1799, stripped of his title in 1799
            - Hengyuan (恆元; 1750–1789), Yalang'a's son, posthumously honoured as Prince Keqin of the Second Rank
              - Shangge (尚格; 1770–1833), Hengyuan's son, held the title Prince Keqin of the Second Rank from 1799 to 1833, posthumously honoured as Prince Keqinjian of the Second Rank (克勤簡郡王)
                - Chengshuo (承碩; 1802–1839), Shangge's son, held the title Prince Keqin of the Second Rank from 1833 to 1839, posthumously honoured as Prince Keqinke of the Second Rank (克勤恪郡王)
                  - Qinghui (慶惠; 1819–1861), Chengshuo's son, held the title Prince Keqin of the Second Rank from 1842 to 1861, posthumously honoured as Prince Keqinmin of the Second Rank (克勤敏郡王)
                    - Jinqi (晉祺; 1840–1900), Qinghui's son, held the title Prince Keqin of the Second Rank from 1861 to 1900, posthumously honoured as Prince Keqincheng of the Second Rank (克勤誠郡王)
                      - Songjie (崧傑; 1879–1910), Jinqi's son, held the title Prince Keqin of the Second Rank from 1900 to 1910, posthumously honoured as Prince Keqinshun of the Second Rank (克勤順郡王)
                        - Yansen (晏森; 1896–?), Songjie's son, held the title Prince Keqin of the Second Rank from 1910–?

== Family tree ==
Family of Prince Keqin

Yoto 岳托 (1599–1639); Prince Cheng (of the First Rank) 成親王 (1636)
Luoluohun 羅洛渾 (died 1646); Prince Yanxijie衍僖介郡王 (1644–1646)
Luokeduo 羅科鐸 (died 1682); Prince Pingbi 平比郡王 (1646–1682)
Naertu 訥爾圖 (1665–1696); Prince Ping 平郡王 (1683–1687) (stripped of his title)	Naerfu 訥爾福 (died 1701); Prince Pingdao 平悼郡王 (1687–1701)
Naqing'e 訥清額 (1692–1765); Prince Keqin 克勤郡王 (posthumously awarded)	Naersu 訥爾蘇 (died 1740); Prince Ping 平郡王 (1701–1726) (stripped of his title)
Yalang'a 雅朗阿 (died 1794); Prince Keqinzhuang 克勤莊郡王 (1780–1794)	Fupeng 福彭 (1708–1748); Prince Pingmin 平敏郡王 (1726–1748)	Fuxiu 福秀 (1710–1741); Beizi 貝子
Hengjin 恆謹; Prince Keqin 克勤郡王 (1795–1799) (stripped of his title)	Hengyuan 恆元 (1750–1789); Prince Keqin 克勤郡王 (posthumously awarded)	Qingming 慶明 (died 1750); Prince Pingxi 平僖郡王 (1749–1750)	Qingheng 慶恆 (died 1779); Prince Keqinliang 克勤良郡王 (1750–1779)
Shangge 尚格 (1770–1833); Prince Keqinjian 克勤簡郡王 (1799–1833)
Chengshuo 承碩 (1802–1839); Prince Keqinke 克勤恪郡王 (1833–1839)
Qinghui 慶惠 (1819–1861); Prince Keqinmin 克勤敏郡王 (1842–1861)
Jinqi 晉祺 (1840–1900); Prince Keqincheng 克勤誠郡王 (1861–1900)
Songjie 崧傑 (1879–1910); Prince Keqinshun 克勤順郡王 (1900–1910)
Yansen 晏森 (1896–?); Prince Keqin 克勤郡王 (1910–?)

Legend:

adoption

== See also ==
- Imperial and noble ranks of the Qing dynasty
