= Lord Gong =

Lord Gong may refer to:

- Baron Gong of Julu (Chinese: 鉅鹿恭男; pinyin: Jùlù Gōng-nán; 598–666), court official of the Tang Dynasty
- Duke Gong (disambiguation) (Chinese: Gong-gōng), several dukes named Gong
- Marquis Gong (disambiguation) (Chinese: Gong-hóu), several marquises named Gong
- Prince Gong (disambiguation) (Chinese: Gong-wáng), several princes named Gong
- King Gong (disambiguation) (Chinese: Gong-wáng), several kings named Gong
- Emperor Gong (disambiguation) (Chinese: Gong-di), several emperors named Gong

== See also ==
- Lord (disambiguation)
- Gong (disambiguation)
