= Prince Gong (disambiguation) =

Prince Gong (1833–1898), was a Qing dynasty prince and the sixth son of the Daoguang Emperor

Prince Gong (恭王) may also refer to:

== People ==
Han dynasty

- Prince Gong of Liang, born Liu Mai, a grandson of Emperor Wen of Han
- Prince Gong of Lu, born Liu Yu, a son of Emperor Wu of Han

Three Kingdoms period

- Prince Gong of Chenliu, born Cao Jun, a son of Cao Cao of Wei during the Three Kingdoms period

Tang dynasty

- Prince Gong of Pu, born Li Tai, a son of Emperor Taizong of Tang

Qing dynasty

- Prince Gong (peerage), the Qing dynasty princely peerage associated with Changning and Yixin's family lines
- Changning (prince), Qing dynasty prince and first bearer of the Prince Gong title

== Other uses ==
- Prince Gong Mansion, Yixin's former home, now a museum in Beijing, China

== See also ==
- King Gong (disambiguation)
- Gong (disambiguation)
