= Gong gong =

Gong gong, Gonggong, or Gong Gong, may refer to:

== Places ==
- 225088 Gonggong (2007 OR10; Dwarf Planet Gonggong), a trans-Neptunian object
- Gong Gong, Victoria, Australia

== People and characters ==
- Duke Gong (disambiguation) (Chinese: 共公; pinyin: Gōng Gōng), several dukes named Gong

=== Mythological characters ===
- Gonggong (共工, Gung-gung), a Chinese water deity

=== Fictional characters ===
- Gong Gong Quan (Maternal Grandfather Quan), a character from the 2022 film Everything Everywhere All at Once
- Alpha Gong Gong (Alpha-verse Grandfather), a character from the 2022 film Everything Everywhere All at Once
- Gong Gong (Chinese: 公公), a character from the Singaporean TV show Happy Can Already! 4

== Music ==
- "I'm Blue (The Gong-Gong Song)", a 1961 song by Ike and Tina Turner
- "Gong Gong" (song), a 1995 song by Sportsguitar
- "Gong Gong" (song), a 2009 song by Nephew off the album Danmark/Denmark
- "Yo contigo, tú conmigo (The Gong Gong Song)", a 2017 song by Morat

== Other uses ==
- Gongong Hall, a fictional organization in the animated TV show The Legend of Qin; see List of The Legend of Qin episodes

== See also ==
- "Gong! Gong! Gong!" (song), a 2015 single by Rinne Yoshida
- Gong Gong Gong, a Chinese experimental rock band
- Gong (disambiguation)
