= The Gong =

The Gong may refer to

- nickname for Australian city of Wollongong
- Leonard Howell, founder of the Rastafari movement, known as The Gong
- The Gongs, an experimental folk band

== See also ==
- Gong (disambiguation)
