= Yuzhan =

Chinese calligrapher (1923-2016)

Prince Gong of the Third Rank
- Tenure: 1936–1945
- Predecessor: Puwei
- Successor: None
- Born: 28 November 1923; Kwantung Leased Territory
- Died: 8 July 2016 (aged 92); Beijing, China
Names
- Aisin Gioro Yuzhan (愛新覺羅·毓嶦)
- House: Aisin Gioro
- Father: Puwei
- Mother: Lady Zhang

Yuzhan
- Traditional Chinese: 毓嶦
- Simplified Chinese: 毓嶦
Transcriptions
Standard Mandarin
- Hanyu Pinyin: Yùzhān

Jungu (courtesy name)
- Chinese: 君固
Transcriptions
Standard Mandarin
- Hanyu Pinyin: Jūngù

Yuzhan (Chinese: 毓嶦, 28 November 1923 – 8 July 2016), courtesy name Jungu (君固), was a Chinese calligrapher of Manchu descent. He was a member of the Aisin Gioro clan, the imperial clan of the Manchu-led Qing dynasty. He was also the seventh son of Puwei (溥偉) and a great-grandson of Yixin (Prince Gong).

Yuzhan was born in Dalian, Liaoning on 28 November 1923. He developed a keen interest in calligraphy, and learned the style of the Qing imperial clan. During the Second Sino-Japanese War, Yuzhan and his father, Puwei, served in the puppet state of Manchukuo, where Puyi, the last emperor of the Qing dynasty, had been installed by the Japanese as Manchukuo's emperor. Puyi later referred to Yuzhan as "Xiaogu" (小固) in his autobiography. When Puwei died in 1936, Yuzhan inherited his father's princely title, "Prince Gong of the First Rank" (恭親王), and held this title until 1945. At the end of the war in 1945, Yuzhan was captured by Soviet forces and extradited to the War Criminals Management Centre in Fushun, Liaoning. He was released four years later in 1949.

Yuzhan was sent to perform forced labour during the Cultural Revolution (1966–1976) under the Communist regime. He was a member of many calligraphy societies in China and produced many works. He specialized in the semi-cursive and cursive scripts.

He published his autobiography The Memoirs of Aisin Gioro Yuzhan in May 2005, which recounts his life as an imperial prince with Puyi as a central character.

Yuzhan died on 8 July 2016.

== Works ==
=== Autobiography ===
- 2005 - The Memoirs of Aisin Gioro Yuzhan. Sino-Culture Press, Beijing. ISBN 9787507518313

== See also ==
- Royal and noble ranks of the Qing dynasty
- Ranks of imperial consorts in China#Qing
