= Princess Rongshou =

Qing dynasty princess (1854–1924)

- Princess Rongshou
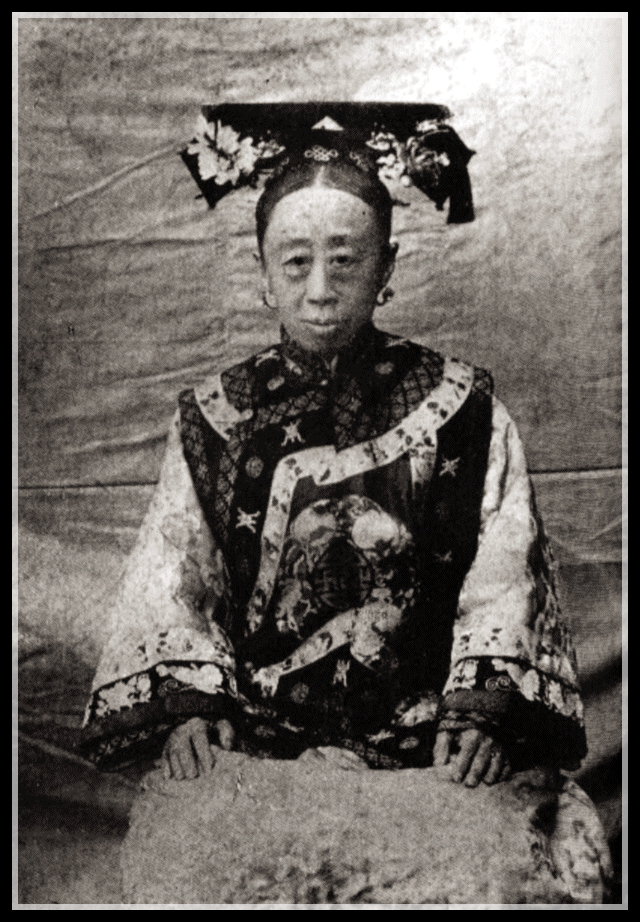
- Princess Rongshou, 1903–1924
- Born: 28 February 1854; Beijing, Qing Dynasty
- Died: 14 December 1924 (aged 70); Beijing, Republic of China
- Spouse: Fucha Zhiduan (m. 1866; died 1871)
- House: Aisin-Gioro (by birth); Fuca clan (by marriage)
- Father: Yixin, Prince Gongzhong of the First Rank
- Mother: Lady Gūwalgiya

Princess Rongshou of the First Rank (Chinese: 榮壽固倫公主; 28 February 1854 – 14 December 1924) was a royal and a political figure of the Qing dynasty. She was the first daughter of Prince Gong, from the ruling House of Aisin-Gioro, and Princess Consort Gongzhong, of the Gūwalgiya clan. In 1865, she was adopted by Empress Dowager Cixi, who raised her since. Rongshou held an important position in the imperial court as the confidant and personal adviser of Cixi, with permission to speak openly to her, and acted as the intermediary for supplicants. At the time of her death, she was the last princess by birth of the Qing dynasty.
