= Yuhuan (disambiguation) =

Yuhuan is a city in Zhejiang, China.

Yuhuan may also refer to:

- Aisin Gioro Yuhuan (1929 – 2003), Chinese artist
- Yang Guifei, or Yang Yuhuan

== See also ==
- Yu Huan
