= Gong (disambiguation) =

A gong is a percussive musical instrument or a warning bell.

Gong or GONG may also refer to:

== Places ==
- Gong, Iran, a city
- 21523 GONG, an asteroid discovered in 1998
- Gong County, Henan, former name of Gongyi, a city in Henan, China
- Gong County, Sichuan, a county in Sichuan, China
- Wollongong, New South Wales, Australia, nicknamed "the Gong"

== People ==
- Jonathan Crowther, pseudonym Gong, British crossword compiler
- Leonard Howell (1898–1981), known as The Gong, founder of the Rastafari movement
- Gong (surname), several Chinese surnames

=== Rulers and nobles ===
- Gong (title), a title of Chinese nobility generally translated as "duke"
- Marquis Gong (disambiguation), several marquises named Gong
- Duke Gong (disambiguation) (Chinese: 共公; pinyin: Gōng Gōng), several dukes named Gong
- Prince Gong (disambiguation), several princes named Gong
- King Gong (disambiguation), several kings named Gong
- Emperor Gong (disambiguation), several emperors named Gong

== Arts, entertainment, and media ==
=== Music ===
- Gong (band), a Franco-British rock band
- The Gongs, an American experimental folk band
- Gong Gong Gong, a Chinese experimental rock band
- "Gong", a 2005 song by Sigur Rós from Takk...
- "Gong", a song by the Japanese band JAM Project
- "Gong", a single by a Japanese idol group SixTones

=== Television ===
- GONG (IPTV channel), an Internet Protocol Television channel specialising in anime
- The Gong Show, American television variety show spoof (1976-1980)
- Palace (TV series) (Gōng), a Chinese TV series

=== Other arts, entertainment, and media ===
- Gong (magazine), a German television magazine
- Gong bass drum, a type of drum
- Gong 97.1, a classic rock radio station in Nuremberg, Germany.

== Organizations ==
- GONG (organization), a Croatian non-government organization that oversees elections
- Global Oscillations Network Group, studying solar structure and dynamics

== Other uses ==
- Gōng or Guang (vessel), an ancient Chinese shape of ritual ewer
- Gong farmer, term used in Tudor Britain for a person who emptied privies and cesspits
- Gong Gong, Chinese water god
- Gong language

== See also ==
- Kong (surname) (孔), a Korean and Chinese surname, sometimes written as "Gong"
- Gong gong (disambiguation)
