= List of Chinese surnames taken by the Manchu clans =

Most of the Manchu clans took on their Han surnames after the demise of the Qing dynasty. Several clans took on Han identity as early as in the Ming dynasty period. The surnames were derived from the Chinese meaning of their original clan name, Chinese transliteration of the clan's name, the possessed territories, generation and personal names of the clansmen and also inspired by the surnames taken by related clans and branches. Only a few clans have origins dating back to the Jurchen-led Jin dynasty. The majority has their origin dating back to the Ming dynasty or the Qing dynasty. The clans were also formed from the cadet branches of the elder or more prominent ones. Most of the clans had Mongol, Daur, Uighur, Han, Korean or Evenk descent. The following tables contain the list of the surnames taken by the Manchu clans.

== A ==
Clan	Surnames	Origin	References
Aisin Gioro	Jin, Pu, Yu, Ai, Zhao, Xi and other	Chinese translation of the clan's name, generation names, Chinese transliteration	
Anggang (昂刚氏)	An (安), Gang (刚/冈)	Chinese transliteration	(Note: The clan took chinese surnames during the Qing dynasty)
Acigecair (阿其格查依尔氏)	A (阿)	Chinese transliteration	
Aihui (瑷珲氏)	Ai (艾/爱), Hui (珲)	Chinese transliteration	
Aiyi (爱义氏)	Ai (爱/艾), Yi (伊), Zhang (张)	Chinese transliteration, the names of branches	
Aiyos (艾耀施氏)	Ai (艾), Shi (施)	Chinese transliteration	(Note: Clan of Mongol descent)
Akjan (阿克占)	Dian (典), Zhan (战), Lei (雷) and other	Chinese translation of the clan's name, the names of territories ruled by the clan	(Note: Most of the surnames taken during the Ming dynasty)
Alai (阿赉)	Hua (华), Jin (金), Lai (来)	Chinese translation of the clan's name, Chinese transliteration	
Alar (阿拉尔氏)	Shan (山), Ji (吉)	The names of territories ruled by the clan	(Note: Clan of Daur descent)
Albaki (阿勒巴齐氏)	Ba (巴)	Chinese transliteration	(Note: Clan was annihilated because of the treason in 1911)
Altanemok (阿勒坦鄂谟克氏)	Zhang (张)	The surnames taken by the related clans	
Alte (阿勒特氏)	Jin (金), Yuan (元), He (何) and other	Chinese translation of the clan's name, the surnames taken by the related clans	
Amuharnu (阿穆哈尔努氏)	Mu (穆), Hei (黑)	Chinese transliteration, Chinese translation of the clan's name	
Amnibutas (阿穆尼布塔斯氏)	Jin (金)	The surnames taken by the related clans	
Amuru 阿穆噜氏）	Ying (英), Liu (刘), Mu (穆), Yang (杨), Su (苏),	Chinese transliteration of the clan's name, generation names	
Andara (安达拉氏)	Lu (路), An (安)	Chinese transliteration, Chinese translation of the clan's name	
Angiya (安佳氏)	An (安)	The initial name of the clan	(Note: The clan of Han descent)
Aogiya (敖佳氏)	Ao (敖)	The initial name of the clan	
Aoratosin (敖拉托欣氏)	Shan (山)	Chinese translation of the clan's name	
Arabiancian (阿拉边前氏)	Bian (边)	Transliteration of clan's name	(Note: Clan of Evenk descent)
Arakcou (阿喇克球氏)	Jin (金), Qi (奇), Lu (鲁), Ke (柯), A (阿)	Chinese transliteration, generation names, the surnames taken by related clans	
Arakta (阿拉克塔氏)	A (阿), Chang (常), Bai (白), Zhang (张)	Chinese transliteration, the names of territories ruled by the clansmen	
Arbentcang (阿尔本昌)	Lu (鹿), Shan (山)	The names of typical actions taken by the clansmen (hunting in the mountains, farming)	
Arbu (阿尔布氏)	A (阿), Ba (巴), Bu (布)	Chinese transliteration	
Ardan (阿尔丹氏)	A (阿), An (安), Jin (金)	Chinese transliteration, Chinese translation of the clan's name	
Argi (阿尔吉氏)	Jiu (酒)	Chinese translation of the clan's name	
Ariha (阿礼哈氏)	He (何), Li (李)	Chinese transliteration	
Arla (阿尔拉氏)	He (何), La (剌), A (阿), Jin (金)	Chinese transliteration, the names taken by related clans	
Artas (阿尔塔斯氏)	Jin (金)	The surnames taken by related clans	
Aru (阿噜氏)	Lu (鲁), Guo (郭), E (鄂)	Chinese transliteration	
Arurote (阿噜罗特氏)	Jin (金)	The surnames taken by the related clans	
Arute (阿魯特/阿鲁特)	Ke (何), Jin (金), Yuan (元)	The surnames taken by the related clans	
Asuke (阿苏克氏)	Jin (金)	The surnames taken by the related clans	
Asute (阿苏特氏)	Jin (金)	The surnames taken by the related clans	
Atamu (阿塔穆氏)	A (阿), Mu (穆)	Chinese transliteration	
Aturamo (阿图拉墨氏)	Mo (莫/墨)	Chinese transliteration	
Aha Gioro (阿哈觉罗氏)	Zhao (赵), A (阿)	Chinese transliteration, surnames taken by the related clans	
Ayan Gioro (阿颜觉罗氏)	Zhao (赵), Chang (常)	The surnames taken by the related clans, the generation names	
Ayantatar (阿颜塔塔尔氏)	Yan (严), Er (尔)	Chinese transliteration	

== B ==
Clan	Surnames	Origin	References
Bagiri (巴济哩氏)	Ba (巴), Li (李)	Chinese transliteration	
Baica (拜察氏)	Bai (白/拜), Cha (察)	Chinese transliteration	
Baican (拜禅氏)	Bai (拜/柏/白)	Chinese transliteration	
Baidar (拜达尔氏)	Bai (白/拜), Da (达), Su (苏)	Chinese transliteration, the name of the territory ruled by the clan	
Baidu (拜都氏)	Bai (白)	Chinese transliteration	
Baige (拜格氏)	Bai (白/拜), Bo (卜)	Chinese transliteration	
Baigin (拜津氏)	Bai (拜/白/柏), Jin (晋)	Chinese transliteration	
Baigiya (拜佳氏)	Bai (拜)	Chinese transliteration	
Baigiyara (拜嘉拉氏)	Bai (白), Na (那), Ji (吉)	Chinese transliteration, Chinese names of the people inhabiting territories ruled by the clan	
Baksang (巴克桑)	Ba (巴), Sang (桑), Yan (阎)	Chinese transliteration	
Barda (巴尔达氏)	Ba (巴/把), Da (达)	Chinese transliteration	
Barhu (巴尔虎氏)	Ba (巴), Bai (白), Bo (卜), Guan (冠), Guo (郭), He (何/赫), Hu (胡), Kang (康), Man (满), Ma (马), Han (韩), Che (车), Wu (吴), Tan (谭), Fu (富)	Chinese transliteration, the names taken by the branches	(Note: Dissolution of the clan in the Ming dynasty) (Note: Clan of Tungusic origin)
Bari (巴哩氏)	Bo (博)	Chinese transliteration	
Barin (巴林氏)	Zhan (詹), Ba (巴), Lin (林)	Chinese transliteration, generation names of the clansmen	
Barla (巴尔拉氏)	Ba (巴/把), A (阿), La (剌)	Chinese transliteration	
Barute (巴鲁特氏)	Ba (巴), Bai (白/拜), Su (苏), Li (李)	Chinese transliteration	
Basun (巴逊氏)	Ba (巴), Bai (白), Sun (孙)	Chinese transliteration	
Bayak (巴雅克氏)	Ba (巴), Xi (锡), Yan (阎), Chang (常), Huo (霍), Wu (武)	Chinese transliteration, the generation names of clansmen, the names of territories	
Bayan (巴颜氏)	Ba (巴), Li (李), Fu (富), Yu (于), Yan (颜), Bo (博)	Chinese transliteration, the meaning of the clan's name, the names of clansmen	
Bayara (巴雅拉氏)	Bai (白), Fu (富), Ying (英), Zhao (赵)	Chinese transliteration, the meaning of the clan's name, the surnames taken by related clans	
Bayarki (巴雅尔齐氏)	Ba (巴), Qi (齐)	Chinese transliteration	
Bayingeri (拜英格哩氏)	Bai (拜/白), Qiu (秋)	Chinese transliteration, the surname taken by the related clans, the meaning of the clan's name	(Note: Clan of Nanai descent)
Bayote (巴岳特)	Ba (巴), Yue (岳/乐)	Chinese transliteration	
Bayotu (巴岳图氏)	Ba (巴), Yue (岳), Bai (白), Xiao (萧), Gao (高), Yuan (袁)	Chinese transliteration, the surnames taken by the related clans, the territories controlled by the clan	
Beisu (伯苏氏)	Su (苏), Tang (唐), Lu (鹿), Bai (白)	Chinese transliteration	
Beisut (伯苏特氏)	Bai (白), Su (苏), Lu (鹿)	Chinese transliteration, surnames taken by the related clans	
Bektu (伯克图氏)	Bo (卜/博), Du (杜), He (和), Ke (柯), Tu (涂), Si (司)	Chinese transliteration, surnames taken by the related clans	
Biangiya (边佳氏)	Bian (卞), Jia (佳)	Chinese transliteration	
Biaote (表特氏)	Biao (表/标), Yang (杨), Du (杜), Ba (巴)	Chinese transliteration, surnames taken by the related clans, the names of territories controlled by the clansmen	
Bira (必喇氏)	Bi (毕/碧), He (何)	Chinese transliteration, surnames taken by related clans	
Biru (碧鲁氏)	Bi (毕), He (何), Yi (异)	Chinese transliteration, surnames taken by related clans	
Birure (必鲁哷)	He (何), Lu (鲁)	Chinese transliteration, surnames taken by related clans	
Birya (弼尔雅氏)	Bi (毕/弼)	Chinese transliteration	
Bodisi (博第斯氏)	Shi (史), Luo (罗), Bo (博)	Chinese transliteration	
Bodot (博多特氏)	Cha (察), Bo (博), Duo (多), Bai (白)	Chinese transliteration, the surnames taken by the related clans, Chinese translation	
Boduri (博都哩氏)	Hua (花), Fan (范), Bo (博/卜), Bu (布), Yu (余)	Chinese transliteration, the names of clansmen	
Bogulot (博古罗特氏)	Luo (罗), Gu (古), Bai (白), Bao (宝), Xi (锡)	Chinese transliteration, Chinese names of the territories	
Boheloke (博和罗克氏/博古罗克氏)	Lu (鲁), Luo (罗), Gu (古)	Chinese transliteration, surnames taken by the related clans	
Bohite (博希特氏)	Bao (包), Bai (白), Xi (锡)	Chinese transliteration	
Boholo (博和罗氏)	Bo (博), Huo (霍/活), He (何), Luo (罗), Tuo (托), Tao (陶)	Chinese transliteration, the surnames taken by the related clans	(Note: Clan of Sibe descent)
Bohori (博和哩氏)	Bo (博), Pu (蒲), Bao (宝), Dou (窦)	Chinese transliteration, the surnames taken by the related clans	
Boljok (博勒卓克氏)	Bo (博), Zhuo (卓)	Chinese transliteration	
Bolot (博罗特氏)	Bao (包), Jin (金), Fu (福), Luo (罗), Zheng (郑), Bo (博), Lu (鲁)	Chinese transliteration, the alternative names of territories ruled by the clan, the generation names of the clansmen, the names taken by the related clans	
Boogi (宝济氏)	Bao (宝/保), Xing (邢), Liu (刘)	Chinese transliteration, the names of territories, the surnames taken by the related clans	
Boogiya 保佳氏)	Bao (宝/鲍)	Chinese transliteration, the surnames taken by the related clans, the names of clansmen	
Borigit (宝里吉特氏)	Bao (宝/鲍/包), Bo (博/波), Luo (罗), Qi (奇), Ji (吉), Zhuo (卓)	Chinese transliteration, the surnames taken by the related clans, the names of clansmen	(Note: Clan included into Borjike clan in the Jin dynasty)
Borgike (博尔济克氏)	Bai (白), Bo (博), Luo (罗), Min (敏), Bu (布)	Chinese transliteration, the surnames taken by the related clans	
Borgun (博尔衮氏)	Bo (博), Qin (秦), Qing (清), Bao (宝/包), Er (尔)	Chinese transliteration, the literal meaning of the clan's name, the surnames taken by the related clans	
Borjigin (博尔济吉特氏)	Bao (鲍), Qi (奇)	Chinese transliteration	
Borjisi (博尔济斯氏)	Bo (博), Ba (巴), Bu (布), Si (斯), Song (松)	Chinese transliteration, the name of the territories ruled by the clan	
Borke (博尔克氏)	Bao (包/宝), Er (尔), Ke (柯), Lu (鲁), Lü (吕), Su (速), Yi (伊/宜), Yue (岳)	Chinese transliteration, the name of the progenitor, the generation names	
Borsut (博尔齐特氏)	Bai (白), Ba (巴), Su (苏), Lu (鹿)	Chinese transliteration, the names of the clansmen	
Bosoo (博硕氏)	Bo (博/波), Wang (王), Tu (图), Da (达), Yu (玉), Bao (宝/包/鲍), Qi (奇), Luo (罗)	Chinese transliteration, the names of territories	
Budara (布达拉氏)	Bu (卜)	Chinese transliteration	
Bugilgen (布吉尔根氏)	Bu (布), Pu (朴)	Chinese transliteration	
Bukur (布库尔氏)	Bu (布), Bo (博), Ku (库), Da (达), E (鄂)	Chinese transliteration, the Chinese name of the descent	
Bulamu (布喇穆氏)	Bu (布/卜), Bi (比), Cha (察), Huang (黄), Mu (木/穆), Suo (索)	Chinese transliteration, the names of the territories ruled by the clansmen	
Bulca (布尔察氏)	Bu (卜/布/步)	Chinese transliteration	
Bulendurben (布楞都尔本氏)	Bu (布), Wu (乌/吴), Ben (本)	Chinese transliteration, name of the nerritory ruled by the clansmen	
Bulhaci (布勒哈齐氏)	Bu (布/步), Ha (哈), Qi (齐), Ba (把)	Chinese transliteration	
Bulni (布尔尼氏)	Bu (卜/布)	Chinese transliteration, name of the progenitor	
Bultu (布尔图氏)	Bu (布/卜), Guo (郭), He (和/何), Hong (洪)	Chinese transliteration, names of the territories ruled by the clansmen	
Buni (布尼氏)	Bu (布/卜), Yu (于)	Chinese transliteration	
Burhacit (布尔哈齐特氏)	Bu (布/卜), Ge (葛), Sa (撒)	Chinese transliteration, names of the clansmen	
Burut (布鲁特氏)	Bu (布/卜), Pu (蒲), Lu (鲁)	Chinese transliteration	(Note: Clan of Kirghiz descent)
Busa (布萨氏)	Lin (林), Bu (卜/布), Sa (萨)	Chinese transliteration, the surnames taken by the related clans	
Busai (布赛氏)	Bu (布), Sai (赛), Lan (兰), Liu (柳)	Chinese transliteration, the names of territories inhabited by clansmen	
Busi (布希氏)	Bu (布/步), Pu (蒲)	Chinese transliteration, the previous name of the clan (蒲鲜)	
Buyamuci (布雅穆齐氏)	Bu (布), Yan (阎), Mu (穆)	Chinese transliteration, the names of territories inhabited by the clan	

== C ==
Clan	Surnames	Origin	References
Cygiya (持佳氏)	Chi (池/迟/持), Zhang (张)	Chinese transliteration, the initial name of the clan (赤盏氏)	
Cagiya (查佳氏)	Liu (刘), Cha (查)	Chinese transliteration, the initial name of the clan	(Note: Clan of Xianbei descent)
Cahala (察哈拉氏)	Cha (察/查/插), Duo (多), Ha (哈), Zhu (朱), Ping (平), An (安), Yi (伊), He (赫/贺), Ming (明), Jin (金), Xiao (肖), Mei (梅), Wu (吴/武), Yuan (袁)	Chinese transliteration, names of the territories ruled by the clansmen, generation names	
Caigiya (蔡佳氏)	Cai (蔡), Jia (佳)	Chinese transliteration	
Cala Gioro (察喇觉罗氏)	Zhao (赵/兆), Bai (白), Cha (察)	Chinese transliteration, the surnames taken by the related clans	
Canggiya (常佳氏)	Chang (常)	Chinese transliteration	
Caodan (漕丹氏)	Chang (常), Cao (曹/漕)	Chinese transliteration, the surnames taken by the related clans, the names of territories ruled by the clansmen	
Caogiya (操佳氏)	Cao (曹)	Chinese transliteration, initial surname of the clan	
Caomut (超穆特氏)	Chao (巢/超/晁), Chuo (绰), Mu (穆)	Chinese transliteration	
Cemgun (彻穆衮氏)	Shen (沈/申), Che (撤/车), Kun (昆)	Chinese transliteration, alternative names of the clan (沈谷)	
Cenggiya (程佳氏)	Cheng (成/程/承), Rong (荣)	Chinese transliteration, initial names of the clans	
Cengiya (陈佳氏)	Chen (陈)	Chinese transliteration, initial names of the clans	
Cengni (成尼氏)	Cheng (承/成/程), Ji (纪)	Chinese transliteration, the names of the related clans	
Ceyele (彻叶哷氏)	Che (车/撤/彻)	Chinese transliteration	
Ciangiya (钱佳氏)	Qian (钱)	Initial surname of the clan	
Ciaogamuk (乔噶木克氏)	Qiao (乔)	Chinese transliteration	
Ciaogamut (乔噶穆特氏)	Qiao (乔), Qi (齐)	Chinese transliteration, the surnames taken by the related clans	
Ciaogiya (乔佳氏)	Qiao (乔)	Initial surname of the clan	
Cibogio (齐步樵氏)	Qi (齐)	Chinese transliteration	
Cibukinut (齐布齐努特氏)	Qi (齐)	Chinese transliteration	
Cidare (齐达哷氏)	Qi (戚/齐)	Chinese transliteration	
Cideri (奇德哩氏)	Qi (奇/祁/齐)	Chinese transliteration	
Cidumu (奇杜穆氏)	Qi (奇), Mu (穆), Du (杜)	Chinese transliteration	
Cigiya (齐佳氏)	Qi (齐/祁)	Chinese transliteration, the names of territories ruled by the clansmen	
Cikteng (齐克腾氏)	Qi (齐)	Chinese transliteration	
Cilei (奇垒氏)	Qi (奇), Lei (雷)	Chinese transliteration, the surnames taken by the related clans	
Cileng (奇楞氏)	Qi (齐/奇)	Chinese transliteration, the surnames taken by the related clans, the names of territories ruled by the clansmen	
Cilik (齐理克氏)	Qi (齐)	Chinese transliteration	
Cimos (奇墨斯氏)	Qi (奇), Mo (莫)	Chinese transliteration	
Cimot (齐默特氏)	Chen (陈), Mo (默), Qi (齐), Su (苏)	Chinese transliteration, the names of the territories ruled by the clansmen, the generation names	
Cimuk (齐穆克氏)	Qi (齐)	Chinese transliteration	
Cinggeri (庆格哩氏)	Qing (庆)	Chinese transliteration	
Ciogiya (秋佳氏)	Qiu (秋/邱)	Chinese transliteration, the surnames taken by the related clans	
Ciošuri (秋舒哩氏)	Qiu (秋), Shu (舒)	Chinese transliteration	
Cirgot (奇尔果特氏)	Qi (奇/齐)	Chinese transliteration, the surnames taken by the related clans	
Ciugiya (屈佳氏)	Qu (屈)	Initial surname of the clan	
Ciuwangiya (全佳氏)	Quan (全)	Initial surname of the clan	
Ciyanghili (强恰哩氏/强奇里氏)	Qiang (强)	Chinese transliteration	
Congira (崇吉拉氏)	Cong (丛), Chong (崇), Ji (吉), Bi (毕)	Chinese transliteration, the names of territories inhabited by clansmen (Bixin, Yongji)	
Cogoru (崇果噜氏)	Chong (崇), Lu (鲁)	Chinese transliteration, the names of territories inhabited by clansmen (Chong, Cogoru)	
Cokcin (绰克秦氏)	Chu (初), Ke (克), Cha (察), Qin (秦)	Chinese transliteration, the names of territories ruled by clansmen	
Colos (绰罗斯氏)	Ge (葛), Luo (罗), Ce (策), Tang (唐), Chuo (绰), Liu (刘), Wa (瓦), Wo (斡), Zuo (左), Qi (齐)	Chinese transliteration, the generation names, the names of territories ruled by clansmen (Oirat)	
Congnile (丛尼勒氏)	Cong (丛), Kong (孔)	Chinese transliteration, the names of territories ruled by clansmen (Kongnila)	
Cuigiya (崔佳氏)	Cui (崔)	Initial name of the clan (Cui)	
Cuijuk (崔珠克氏)	Cui (崔), Liu (刘), Chi (赤/迟)	Chinese transliteration, alternative names of the clan (赤穆特), names of the related clans, names of the territories inhabited by clansmen	
Cuimulu (崔穆鲁氏)	Cui (崔)	Chinese transliteration	
Cukule (楚库勒氏)	Chu (楚), Jin (金), Yi (伊)	Chinese transliteration, the names of territories	

== D ==
Clan	Surnames	Origin	References
Dahuri (达呼哩氏)	Da (达), Hu (呼)	Chinese transliteration of clan's name, clan's descent	
Daibolo (戴卜罗氏)	Dai (戴), Bu (卜), Luo (罗)	Chinese transliteration	
Donggo (董鄂氏)	Dong (董), Zhao (赵), He (何), Tang (唐), E (鄂), Cheng (成), Xi (席), Tong (佟), Peng (彭), Qi (齐), Hong (红)	Chinese transliteration, surname of the progenitor (Zhao Cai), generation names, surnames taken by collateral clans	

== E ==
Clan	Surnames	Origin	References

== F ==
Clan	Surnames	Origin	References

== G ==
Clan	Surnames	Origin	References
de Gioro （来自）觉罗（红带子）	Bai (白), Zhao (赵), Heng (恒), Hong (洪)	This de Gioro surname refers specifically to the early surname before it was changed to Aisin-Gioro, specifically referring to the red-belt descendants of the house of Aisin-Gioro who were named with this Manchu surname. In addition, this entry does not refer to the Gioro surname of other Manchu tribes.	

== H ==
Clan	Surnames	Origin	References

== I ==
Clan	Surnames	Origin	References

== J ==
Clan	Surnames	Origin	References

== K ==
Clan	Surnames	Origin	References

== L ==
Clan	Surnames	Origin	References

== M ==
Clan	Surnames	Origin	References

== N ==
Clan	Surnames	Origin	References

== P ==
Clan	Surnames	Origin	References

== R ==
Clan	Surnames	Origin	References

== S ==
Clan	Surnames	Origin	References

== T ==
Clan	Surnames	Origin	References
Tatara (他他啦氏)	Tang (唐), Tan (譚), Shu (舒), Wu (吴) Song (松).	Generation names, names of territories, surnames taken by related clans	

== U ==
Clan	Surnames	Origin	References

== W ==
Clan	Surnames	Origin	References

== Y ==
Clan	Surnames	Origin	References
