= Gongzong =

Gongzong is a temple name accorded to Chinese royalty. It may refer to:

- Emperor An of Han (94–125)
- Tuoba Huang (428–451), crown prince of Northern Wei, father of Emperor Wencheng
- Emperor Shang of Tang (died 714), honored as Gongzong by the puppet emperor Li Chenghong
- Zhu Changxun (1586–1641), prince of the Ming dynasty, father of Zhu Yousong

== See also ==
- Emperor Gong (disambiguation)
