= Zaicheng =

Junwang-ranked beile (1858-1885)

- Junwang-ranked beile 郡王銜貝勒
- Born: September 12, 1858
- Died: July 21, 1885 (aged 26)
- Consorts: Lady Foimo
- Issue: Puwei (adoptive son)
Names
- Aisin Gioro Zaicheng (愛新覺羅 載澂)
Posthumous name
- Prince Gongguomin of the First Rank (恭果敏親王)
- House: Aisin-Gioro
- Father: Yixin, Prince Gong
- Mother: Lady Gūwalgiya

Zaicheng (Chinese: 載澂, September 12, 1858 – July 21, 1885) was the eldest son of Yixin, Prince Gong.

== Life ==
He was granted the title of beile. He served as Minister of Internal Affairs and as a commander in Mongolia.

In July 1873, the Qing court removed Zaicheng's title of beile, because he and Tongzhi went out of the palace to visit prostitutes in Peking. However, a month later, the original title were restored. Zaicheng was involved in a further scandal in 1881, when it was discovered that he and his mistress had started a theatre and dressed in commoners' clothes to watch the plays, which was forbidden in the Inner City of Beijing. Zaicheng's father intervened and had the official who reported Zaicheng impeached.

Zaicheng didn't have a son, but because he was the next in line to adopt his father's title, he adopted Puwei to inherit it after his death. He died on July 21, 1885 at the age of 26, and his adopted son Puwei succeeded him as Prince Gong. Because he was the eldest son of Yixin, he was given the posthumous title of "Prince Guomin of the Third Rank".

== Family ==
=== Consorts ===
- Primary consort, of the Foimo clan (费莫氏), daughter of Qing bureaucrat Foimo Wenyu

=== Children ===
- Puwei (溥偉, 1880–1936), adopted son
