= Aisin Gioro Yuhuan =

Chinese artist (1929–2003)

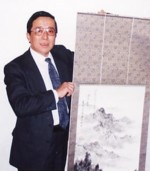
Yuhuan and his work

Aisin Gioro Yuhuan (traditional Chinese: 愛新覺羅·毓峘; simplified Chinese: 爱新觉罗·毓峘; pinyin: Àixīnjuéluó Yùhuán; October 1929 – 23 June 2003) was a Chinese artist born in Prince Gong's Mansion in Beijing, China. During his lifetime, he became well known for traditional Chinese paintings and traditional Chinese music. He was also one of the few remaining direct descendants of the imperial family of the Qing dynasty as the great-great-grandson of the Daoguang Emperor.

== Art career ==
In 1957 Aisin Gioro Yuhuan joined the Artists' Association of China. In 1981 his name was added to The Dictionary of Great Chinese Artist. He won many art prizes in China. His works are classed as Traditional Chinese Art; his themes include mountain landscapes, people, close-ups of flowers, and bamboo.

Aisin Gioro Yuhuan was the only son of Aisin Gioro Pu Shu Ming and lived in the Prince Gong Mansion for some time after the forming of the Republic of China and the downfall of the Qing dynasty. Ties to his uncle Pu Xin-Yu, who was a famous traditional artist in China, provided Aisin Gioro Yuhuan with access to art lessons which helped develop his appetite for painting in the traditional art styles of China. While still in junior high school, he began publishing his comics in newspapers. As his interest in traditional art grew, Aisin Gioro Yuhuan applied and was accepted into the Arts Department of the Beijing Normal University. At university he was instructed in European or so-called western art forms and techniques.

== Music career ==
Aisin Gioro Yuhuan was also a sanxian musician. His lessons with traditional Chinese instruments started when he was a child, still living in the Prince Gong Mansion. At the time of his death Yuhuan had mastered many difficult pieces. He continued to perform into his late sixties.

At the age of eight, Aisin Gioro Yuhuan began his music career with lessons on the sanxian, a three-string, a 500-year-old plucked instrument. The first piece of music he learned was a classic of the Qing dynasty. The piece consisted of many segments—what might be called movements in classical western music, each segment was 20–45 minutes long. He was unable to learn the entire piece of music because his tutor only knew thirteen segments; even so, with a course of one 2-hour lesson per week, it took Aisin Gioro Yuhuan two years to master those 13 segments. Later in life, he passed on his knowledge of that particular piece of music to a lecturer at the Central Conservatoire of Music in Beijing, Tan Longjian.

== Influences ==
Many national leaders and foreign ministers met with Aisin Gioro Yuhuan and purchased his works or received his paintings as donations or presents; those countries include: Hungary, Germany, USA, Canada, Japan. Yuhuan lectured at many universities in Japan, Singapore, and Indonesia. Galleries and exhibitions of his work have been presented to and/or hosted by many of the above countries.

== Family ==
Aixinjueluo Yuhuan had three children: Aixinjueluo Yu Yue (Screenwriter); Aixinjueluo Yu Kai (Artist); and Aixinjueluo Yu Jun (IT specialist). Their given names all begin with 'Yu', the same as their father, and not the supposed 'Heng' as would have been family tradition. This was due to the events of the Cultural Revolution. During the Cultural Revolution many families of royal blood or with Kuomintang associations lived in fear of the Red Guards. Therefore, Aisin Gioro Yuhuan's children were given the name 'Yu'.
