= Puwei =

Prince Gong of the Second Rank (1880-1936)

- Prince Gong of the Second Rank
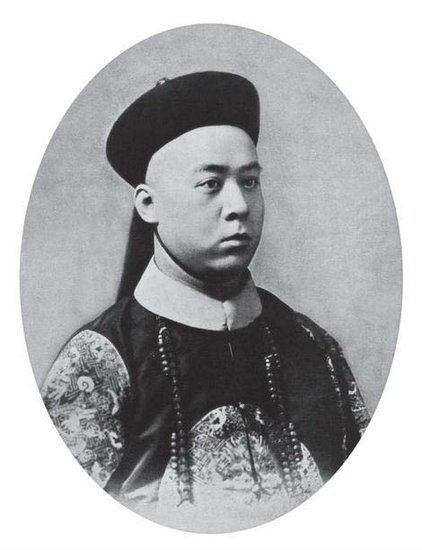

Prince Gong of the Second Rank
- Tenure: 29 May 1898 – 10 October 1936
- Predecessor: Yixin
- Successor: Yuzhan
- Born: 30 December 1880; Beijing, Qing China
- Died: 10 October 1936 (aged 55); Xinjing, Manchukuo
- Issue: Yuzhan
Names
- Puwei (溥偉)
Posthumous name
- Prince Gongxian of the First Rank (恭賢親王)
- House: Aisin-Gioro
- Father: Zaiying (father); Zaicheng (adoptive father)
- Mother: Lady Hešeri

Puwei (Chinese: 溥偉; pinyin: Pǔwěi; 30 December 1880 – 10 October 1936), courtesy name Shaoyuan, was a Manchu prince and statesman of the late Qing dynasty. He was a member of the Prince Gong peerage, and held the title from 1898 until his death in 1936.

== Life ==
=== Life during the Qing dynasty ===
He was a part of the House of Aisin-Gioro. Puwei's biological father was Zaiying, the second son of Yixin. Since Yixin's eldest son Zaicheng died without an heir, Puwei was adopted as Zaicheng's son by the Empress Dowager Cixi's decree. After the death of Zaicheng, Puwei assumed the title of prince and became the second generation Prince Gong. During the 1911 Revolution, he organized the Royalist Party with Shanqi and others in an attempt to restore the Qing Dynasty, and he refused to sign the abdication edict. It is rumored he said "As long as I'm here, we will fight. The Qing Empire will never perish".

=== Life after the Qing dynasty ===
After the Qing dynasty fell, Puwei bought a house on the seaside of Qingdao and brought all his family members from Beijing. When the Japanese army captured Qingdao in 1914, his house, that was built along the sea was naturally exposed to the naval gunfire. One night, after his residence had been shelled several times, Puwei and his family hurried to a friend's house. He took refuge in his residence, but before he could move in, it was shelled too and an entire wall of a room was destroyed. Even in this situation, Puwei still tried to remake the disbanded Zongshe Party, and secretly organized armed forces in the Liaodong area in a desperate attempt to restore the Qing dynasty.

In 1922, China took back the sovereignty of Qingdao from the Japanese. Puwei, who was determined to restore the Qing, left Qingdao after living there for 10 years and went to Dalian, which was under Japanese rule at the time. Before leaving, he gave some of the furniture to Kang Youwei. After experiencing these futile intrigues, Pu Wei became increasingly frustrated. At this time, he also began to realize the difficulty of life financially.

Puwei was immature when it came to employing people. The person that was responsible for managing his property took a lot of money from him. He originally owned thousands of acres of fertile land, and every year the land rent could fully guarantee his royal life, but as the years passed, the person took the money from selling a large area of land and kept the money for himself. He also smuggled out a large number of books and antiques from the Forbidden City. Later, in order to cover up such a large-scale theft, a eunuch set fire to the Forbidden City. Puwei, who became increasingly financially unable, even had to abandon his two-horse glass-covered carriage. After moving north to Dalian, his life became more difficult, and political frustration made his health deteriorate. In October 1936, in a hotel in Changchun, the 56-year-old last Prince Gong died due to poverty and illness.

== Claim to the throne ==
Puwei is the direct grandson of the first generation Prince Gong, Yixin. Yixin's eldest son Zaicheng was supposed to inherit the throne, but he died early. Since Puwei was Zaicheng's adopted son, he had a claim to the throne.

After the Mukden Incident, Japan occupied Manchuria and contacted Puyi to establish a puppet regime. Puyi hesitated and did not agree immediately. Japan then asked Puwei to become Emperor. After hearing the news, Puyi left Tianjin and hurriedly took a boat to Lushun, but the Japanese still felt that Puyi's reputation was greater, so they established the puppet Manchukuo with Puyi as the Chief Executive, and Puwei lost another opportunity to proclaim himself emperor.

== Death ==
In January 1936, Puwei, impoverished and in ill health, was awaiting an audience with Puyi in Xinjing, but died suddenly in the Xinhua Hotel at the age of fifty-six.

At the time Puyi, as emperor of Manchukuo, was persuaded by the Qing imperial family and nobles to allow Puwei's sons to continue inheriting the title of Prince Gong. By then, all of Puwei's adult sons had died young, and only his eldest surviving seventh son, Yuzhan, could inherit the title, and so he was allowed to study in the private school of the Manchukuo palace.

After Puwei's death, the rest of his family members lived in dire straits. Concubine Lady Zhang along with her younger children relocated to Xinjing, the new capital of Manchukuo, to seek refuge with her biological son Yuzhan. Not long after, concubine Lady Zhou also left with her two biological children and remarried a man with the family name of Zhang from the Manchu Plain White Banner.

Later, Puyi recounted Puwei as a martial arts figure in his memoir From Emperor to Citizen.

== Family ==
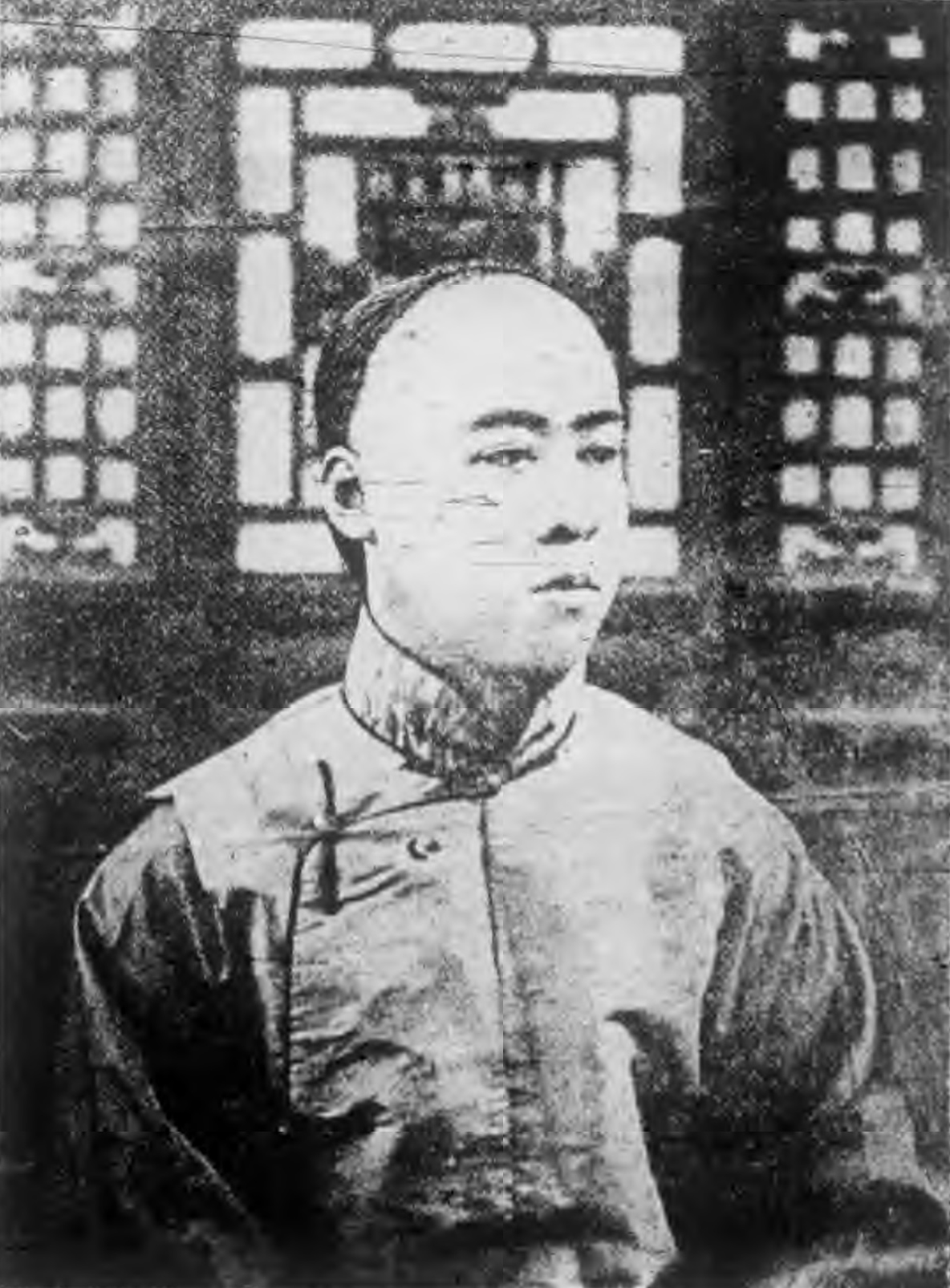
Puwei, Prince Gong

=== Mother and father ===
- Adoptive father: Zaicheng (1858–1885), eldest son of Prince Gong Yixin, posthumously named Prince Gongguomin.
- Biological father: Zaiying (1861–1909), second son of Prince Gong Yixin, was given the title of Beile of Prince Zhong
- Mother: Secondary consort, of the Hešeri clan (側福晉 赫舍里氏)

=== Concubines and wives ===
- Primary consort, of the Biru (嫡福晉 碧魯氏)
- Secondary consort, of the Jiagiya clan (側福晉 賈佳氏)
- Concubine, of the Zhang clan (妾 張氏), mother of Yuzhan, Prince Gong
- Concubine, of the Zhou clan (妾 周氏)

=== Children ===
==== Sons ====
- First son: Unnamed, deceased.
- Second son: Yulin (毓嶙, 1905–?)
- Third son: Yuwan (毓岏, 1906–?)
- Fourth son: Yusong (毓崧, 1907–?)
- Fifth son: Yufen (毓岎, 1909–?)
- Sixth son: Unnamed, deceased
- Seventh son: Yuzhan, Prince Gong (毓嶦, 1923–2016)
- Eighth son: Yulu (毓嵂, 1926–?)
- Ninth son: Unnamed, deceased
- Tenth son: Yurong (毓嶸, 1930–?)
- Eleventh son: Yuyong (毓嵱, 1932–?)

==== Daughters ====
- Daughter: Yunxia (蕴霞, 1934–?)
