= Prince Gong (peerage) =

Princely title in Qing China (1644-1912)

Prince Gong of the First Rank
- Traditional Chinese: 和碩恭親王
- Simplified Chinese: 和硕恭亲王
Transcriptions
Standard Mandarin
- Hanyu Pinyin: héshuò gōng qīnwáng
- Wade–Giles: ho-shuo kung ch'in-wang

Prince Gong of the First Rank (Manchu: ᡥᠣᡧᠣᡳ
ᡤᡠᠨᡤᠨᡝᠴᡠᡴᡝ
ᠴᡳᠨ ᠸᠠᠩ; hošoi gungnecuke cin wang), or simply Prince Gong, was the title of a princely peerage used in China during the Manchu-led Qing dynasty (1644–1912). It was passed down over two different family lines within the Aisin Gioro clan.

The first bearer of the Prince Gong title in the first family line was Changning (1657–1703), the fifth son of the Shunzhi Emperor. He was awarded the title in 1671 by his brother, the Kangxi Emperor. As the Prince Gong peerage was not awarded "iron-cap" status, this meant that each successive bearer of the title would normally start off with a title downgraded by one rank vis-à-vis that held by his predecessor. However, the title would generally not be downgraded to any lower than a feng'en fuguo gong except under special circumstances. It was passed down over ten generations and held by ten persons.

The first bearer of the Prince Gong title in the second family line was Yixin (1833–1898), the sixth son of the Daoguang Emperor. He was awarded the title in 1850 by his father. In 1872, during the reign of the Tongzhi Emperor, the second Prince Gong peerage, unlike the earlier one, was granted "iron-cap" status. This meant that the title could be passed down without being downgraded. The title was passed down over four generations and held by three persons.

== Members of the Prince Gong peerage ==
=== Changning's line (non-"iron-cap") ===
- Changning (1657–1703), the Shunzhi Emperor's fifth son, held the title Prince Gong of the First Rank from 1671 to 1703
  - Haishan (海善; 1676–1743), Changning's third son, held the title of a feng'en jiangjun from 1695 to 1703, promoted to beile in 1703, stripped of his title in 1712, restored as a beile in 1732, posthumously honoured as Ximin Beile (僖敏貝勒)
  - Manduhu (滿都護; 1674–1731), Changning's second son, held the title of a beile from 1712 to 1731, demoted to beizi and then to feng'en zhenguo gong in 1726
    - Lumubu (祿穆布; 1700–1729), Haishan's son
      - Feisu (斐蘇; 1731–1763), Lumubu's eldest son, held the title of a beile from 1731 to 1763
        - Mingshao (明韶; 1742–1787), Feisu's second son, held the title of a beizi from 1763 to 1787
          - Jinchang (晉昌; 1759–1828), Mingshao's eldest son, held the title of a feng'en zhenguo gong from 1788 to 1803, stripped of his title in 1803, restored as a feng'en fuguo gong from 1817 to 1828
          - Jinlong (晉隆; 1761–1819), Mingshao's second son, held the title of a feng'en fuguo gong from 1803 to 1817, stripped of his title in 1817
            - Yucai (玉彩), Jinlong's eldest son, held the title of a third class fuguo jiangjun from 1805 to 1833
            - Xianglin (祥林; 1791–1848), Jinchang's second son, held the title of a buru bafen zhenguo gong from 1828 to 1834
              - Chengxi (承熙; 1832–1891), Xianglin's eldest son, held the title of a buru bafen zhenguo gong from 1834 to 1891
                - Chonglue (崇略; 1850–1894), Chengxi's eldest son, held the title of a buru bafen zhenguo gong from 1892 to 1894
                  - Deyin (德蔭; 1868–1895), Chonglue's eldest son, held the title of a buru bafen zhenguo gong from 1894 to 1895
                  - Demao (德茂; 1882–?), Chonglue's second son, held the title of a buru bafen zhenguo gong from 1895–?
        - Minggong (明恭), Feisu's fifth son, held the title of a second class fuguo jiangjun from 1765 to 1796
          - Jiapei (嘉培), Minggong's second son, held the title of a third class fengguo jiangjun from 1797 to 1817
            - Lianxi (連喜), Jiapei's second son, held the title of a feng'en jiangjun from 1818 to 1836, stripped of his title in 1836
        - Mingpei (明佩), Feisu's sixth son, held the title of a second class fuguo jiangjun from 1765 to 1825
          - Chungu (純嘏), Mingpei's son
            - Qinglin (慶琳), Chungu's eldest son, held the title of a fengguo jiangjun from 1825 to 1845
              - Lingrui (靈瑞), Qinglin's second son, held the title of a feng'en jiangjun from 1845 to 1857, had no male heir
        - Mingzuan (明纘), Feisu's tenth son, held the title of a feng'en jiangjun from 1775 to 1794
          - Yigui (宜貴), Mingzuan's eldest son, held the title of a feng'en jiangjun from 1795 to 1847
            - Guanrui (官瑞), Yigui's eldest son, held the title of a feng'en jiangjun from 1848 to 1857
        - Minggai (明該), Feisu's 11th son, held the title of a feng'en jiangjun from 1775 to 1792
          - Yuxian (玉顯), Minggai's eldest son, held the title of a feng'en jiangjun from 1794 to 1810, had no male heir
        - Mingfan (明範), Feisu's 12th son, held the title of a feng'en jiangjun from 1784 to 1815
        - Mingkun (明昆), Feisu's 14th son, held the title of a feng'en jiangjun from 1784 to 1813
          - Hengchun (恆春), Mingkun's second son, held the title of a feng'en jiangjun from 1814 to 1844
            - Rongxiu (榮秀), Hengchun's eldest son, held the title of a feng'en jiangjun from 1844 to 1883
  - Yongshou (永綬; 1671–1686), Changning's eldest son, held the title of a third class fuguo jiangjun from 1685 to 1686, had no male heir
  - Duiqing'e (對清額; 1681–1742), Changning's fourth son, held the title of a third class fuguo jiangjun from 1700 to 1740
    - Ailong'a (愛隆阿), Duiqing'e's fourth son, held the title of a fengguo jiangjun from 1740 to 1744
      - Anchuhang'a (安楚杭阿), Ailong'a's third son, held the title of a feng'en jiangjun from 1744 to 1745, had no male heir
    - Fuge (福格), Duiqing'e's eighth son, held the title of a feng'en jiangjun from 1757 to 1777, had no male heir
    - Qichen (奇臣), Duiqing'e's ninth son, held the title of a third class fengguo jiangjun from 1757 to 1807, stripped of his title in 1807
  - Zhuotai (卓泰; 1683–1705), Changning's fifth son, held the title of a third class fuguo jiangjun from 1702 to 1705, had no male heir

=== Yixin's line ("iron-cap") ===
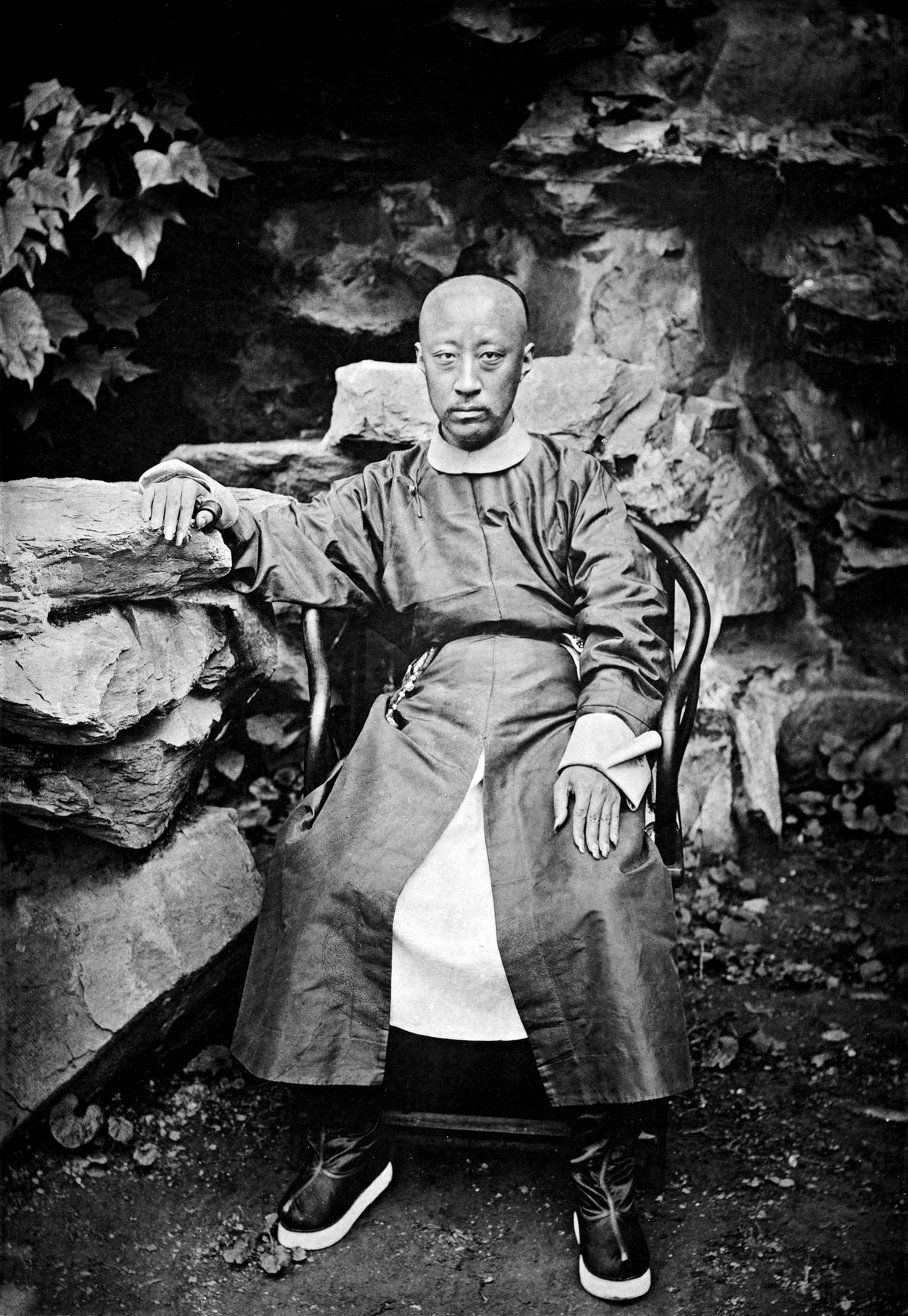
Yixin (1833–1898), the first "iron-cap" Prince Gong

- Yixin (1833–1898), the Daoguang Emperor's sixth son, held the title Prince Gong of the First Rank from 1850 to 1898, posthumously honoured as Prince Gongzhong of the First Rank (恭忠親王)
  - Zaicheng (載澂; 1858–1885), Yixin's eldest son, initially a feng'en fuguo gong from 1860 to 1868, promoted to beile in 1868, awarded junwang status but not a junwang title in 1872, posthumously honoured as Guomin Beile (果敏貝勒)
  - Zaiying (載瀅; 1861–1909), Yixin's second son, held the title of a buru bafen zhenguo gong from 1864 to 1868, adopted into the Prince Zhong peerage as a beile in 1868, stripped of his title in 1900
    - Puwei (溥偉; 1880–1936), Zaiying's eldest son, held the title Prince Gong of the First Rank from 1898 to 1936, posthumously honoured as Prince Gongxian of the First Rank (恭賢親王)
      - Yuzhan (1923–2016), Puwei's seventh son, held the title Prince Gong of the First Rank from 1936 to 1945
  - Zaijun (載濬; 1864–1866), Yixin's third son, held the title of a feng'en fuguo gong from 1864 to 1866, had no male heir
  - Zaihuang (載潢; 1880–1885), Yixin's fourth son, held the title of a buru bafen fuguo gong from 1881 to 1885, had no male heir

== Family trees ==
=== Changning's line ===
Changning 常寧 (1657–1703); Prince Gong 恭親王 (1671–1703)
Manduhu 滿都護 (1674–1731); Feng'en Zhenguo Gong 奉恩鎮國公 (1712–1731) | Haishan 海善 (1676–1743); Beile 貝勒 (1703–1712) (stripped of his title)
Lumubu 祿穆布 (1700–1729)
Feisu 斐蘇 (1715–1763); Beile 貝勒 (1731–1763)
Mingshao 明韶 (1742–1787); Beizi 貝子 (1763–1787)
Jinchang 晉昌 (1759–1828); Feng'en Zhenguo Gong 奉恩鎮國公 (1788–1803); Feng'en Fuguo Gong 奉恩輔國公 (1817–1828) | Jinlong 晉隆 (1761–1819); Feng'en Fuguo Gong 奉恩輔國公 (1803–1817) (stripped of his title)
Xianglin 祥林 (1791–1848); Feng'en Zhenguo Gong 奉恩鎮國公 (1828–1834)
Chengxi 承熙 (1832–1891); Buru Bafen Zhenguo Gong 不入八分鎮國公 (1834–1891)
Chonglue 崇略 (1850–1894); Buru Bafen Zhenguo Gong 不入八分鎮國公 (1892–1894)
Deyin 德蔭 (1868–1895); Buru Bafen Zhenguo Gong 不入八分鎮國公 (1894–1895) | Demao 德茂 (1882–?); Buru Bafen Zhenguo Gong 不入八分鎮國公 (1895–?)
Zhengang 振綱 (1920–?)

=== Yixin's line ===
Yixin 奕訢 (1833–1898); Prince Gongzhong 恭忠親王 (1850–1898)
Zaicheng 載澂 (1858–1885); Guomin Beile 果敏貝勒 (1868–1885) | Zaiying 載瀅 (1861–1909); Beile 貝勒 (1868–1900) (stripped of his title)
adoption
Puwei 溥偉 (1880–1936); Prince Gongxian 恭賢親王 (1898–1936)
Yuzhan 毓嶦 (1923–2016); Prince Gong 恭親王 (1936–1945)

== See also ==
- Royal and noble ranks of the Qing dynasty
- Prince Gong Mansion, the residence of Yixin
