= King Gong =

King Gong (Chinese: 共王; pinyin: Gòng Wáng) may refer to:

- King Gong of Zhou (reigned 922–900 BC), king of the Zhou Dynasty
- King Gong of Chu (r. 590–560 BC), king of the state of Chu

== See also ==
- Prince Gong (disambiguation), whose title is also translated as king
- Gong (disambiguation)
