= Marquis Gong =

Marquis Gong (Chinese: Gong-hou) can refer to:

- Marquis Gōng of Cai (fl. 10th century BC?), fourth ruler of Cai
- Marquis Gòng of Cai (died 760 BC), ninth ruler of Cai
- Marquess Gong of Han (died 363 BC)
- Cao Hong (died 232), Cao Wei general
- Han Ji (died 238), Cao Wei politician

== See also ==
- Gong (disambiguation)
