= Gong (IPTV channel) =

Internet Protocol television channel

GONG is an IPTV (Internet Protocol Television) channel, accessible throughout Europe and North America, entirely dedicated to Anime, Drama, K-pop, e-Sports.

GONG sets out to show, via Web, mobile telephony, video on demand, and streaming media, productions from Japanese studios and Korean networks.

== Brief history ==
Gong Media is an Entertainment (series, animation, music, online gaming) channel distributed internationally on digital platforms: IPTV, Web and mobile. Founded by two French television experts, André de Semlyen and Benoît Runel, Gong Media is a UK limited company with offices in London and Paris. Gong's shareholding structure was reshaped in early 2008, giving Benoit Runel and André de Semlyen a majority of control.

Its brand motto was originally "Anime, Anywhere, Anytime". Its specificities: to broadcast Japanese animation aiming at 15 to 25-year-old core target group (although the audience of the channel is in fact much broader, going from 12 to 35 years old).

GONG Television: GONG launched its first 24/7 Pay TV version on 28 April 2009 in France.

== Methods of accessing the content ==
=== Video on demand ===
GONG's content is available on several online and mobile platforms across Europe and United States covering 42 countries and distribution over 1,000 episodes of High quality Anime. The service is available on SFR, Neuf Cegetel, Bouygues Telecom, Fnac Video, Carrefour Video, DartyBox, Orange, Babelgum, TF1 Vision, Bing Videos, Dailymotion, YouTube, T-Mobile, Vodafone, Blinkbox, Hulu, and Rogers.

=== Mobile telephony ===
At a time of widespread 3G usage, GONG is a partner of Orange (in the UK and in Poland), of T-Mobile and others. Programs, and also sounds, images, video clips, and wallpapers are available through this service.

=== Smartphones ===
GONG has launched the GongApp software for Apple iPhone, iPad and iPod Touch users. The TV feed is also available on Nokia and Apple iOS devices through an app called Gonglive.

=== Broadcast media ===
GONG is also present on YouTube which now makes it possible for channels to make videos available to visitors and thus show complete episodes of a series.

On April 28, 2009, GONG Channel was launched as a 24/7 Pay TV station in France on the SFR cable network, formerly called Neuf. Viewers can now watch it live on channel 63.

The GONG TV station reflects the original online design of the service. As a TV channel, GONG has secured Anime content aimed at 14- to 24-year-old viewers, with titles such as Samurai Champloo, Paranoia Agent, and Ergo Proxy. The linear feed is also available on ORANGE and SFR's mobile 3G network and iPhones.

Free, the independent French IPTV carrier, is also broadcasting GONG as well as a second channel called GONG MAX, launch in November 2014. The channel's new baseline is "Made in Digitainment" to emphasize the native digital entertainment positioning of the brand and the Y generation focus on all new screens.

The 2015 carriers of GONG in France are SFR, Numericable, Virgin Mobile box, Bouygues Telecom, Free, Alice, internet IPTV service PlayTV, Samsung Smart TV's, Orange Mobile, SFR Mobile.. The brand is also available on social networks, Facebook, YouTube, Twitter, Pinterest, Tumblr, Dailymotion, WAT.
