= Biru clan =

Manchu clan and family name

Chinese name
- Chinese: 碧鲁氏
Transcriptions
Standard Mandarin
- Hanyu Pinyin: bì lǔ shì

Manchu name
- Manchu script: ᠪᡳᡵᡠ
- Möllendorff: Biru

Pronunciation respelling name
- Pronunciation respelling: BEE-loo

Biru is a Manchu clans which inhabited the territory ranging from Heilongjiang to Yehe valley. In 1689, the clan was transferred to Bordered Yellow Banner.

After the demise of the Qing dynasty, the modern-day descendants changed their surnames to Bi (毕), He (何), Yi (异). Since 1989, some modern-day descendants live in Japan.

== Notable figures ==
=== Males ===
- Zhumala (朱马喇,1605-1662), served as second rank military official and general of Hangzhou and held a title of third class baron and canonised as Xiangmin (襄敏)
  - Keshan (科山), held a title of baron
    - Funing (富宁), held a title of first class baron
- Ehui (d.1798), served as Viceroy of Sichuan in 1787, a participant of Sino-Nepalese War and war campaigns in Taiwan against Lin Shuangwen (林爽文), a participant of war campaign pacifying White Lotus in 1796, served as a Junior Protector of Crown Prince, first rank military official and Viceroy of Yun-Gui in 1797, canonised as Kejing (恪靖) and enshrined in Xianliang temple (honour revoked in 1799)
- Wenxiu (文绣), a censor
- Shanquan (善佺), an official in the Ministry of Justice (法部)

=== Females ===
Princess Consort

- Primary consort
  - Zaixun's wife, the mother of Pugong (1904–1960s), first daughter (b. 1905), second daughter (b. 1906) and third daughter (b. 1907)
  - Puwei's wife
