= Gong Gong Gong =

Chinese rock band

- Also known as: 工工工
- Origin: Beijing, China
- Genres: Experimental rock, post-punk
- Years active: 2015–present
- Labels: Wharf Cat Records
- Members: Joshua Frank; Tom Ng
- Website: gonggonggong.bandcamp.com

Gong Gong Gong (Chinese: 工工工) is an experimental rock band founded in Beijing in 2015. It consists of guitarist and vocalist Tom Ng, who sings in his native Cantonese, and bassist Joshua Frank. Ng hails from Hong Kong and Frank is from Canada.

== History ==
Gong Gong Gong performed their first show at the closing party for Beijing venue XP in summer 2015. Bassist Joshua Frank was born in Montreal to Canadian diplomatic workers, and spent many years growing up in Beijing in the 1990s, before returning in 2006 and forming the band Hot & Cold with his brother. Guitarist and vocalist Tom Ng moved to Beijing from Hong Kong in 2009 with his previous band, The Offset: Spectacles. Ng performs lyrics in his native language, Cantonese, which Frank is unable to speak. The band would later perform at a city underpass, and then at Fruityspace, a DIY venue founded at an independent record store. Their debut studio album, Phantom Rhythm, was released in October 2019 on Wharf Cat Records, and was covered by outlets such as Allmusic, Pitchfork and Louder Than War. The album was featured on year-end lists from Aquarium Drunkard, Loud and Quiet, Raven Sings The Blues and the CBC. During 2019, the band toured Europe and China and performed at the South by Southwest festival and at MoMA PS1 in New York City.

On 25 June 2021, the band released Phantom Rhythm Remixed, a remix album of their studio debut. The album was announced in March alongside a music video for a remix of the track "Some Kind of Demon" by Chinese-born electronic music producer Yu Su.

In December 2023, Gong Gong Gong announced their second studio album, Mongkok Duel, a split with Taiwanese duo Mong Tong. It was described by both artists as "an imagined soundtrack for a lost kung-fu film". It was initially released as a vinyl exclusive via Bandcamp and live shows. It was reissued for general release on 28 September 2024.

== Discography ==
=== Studio albums ===
- Phantom Rhythm 幽靈節奏 (幽霊リズム) (2019)
- Mongkok Duel 旺角龍虎鬥 (2023)

=== Remix albums ===
- Phantom Rhythm Remixed 幽靈節奏 (2021)

=== Singles ===
- Siren 追逐劇 (2018)
- 演樂胡同 yǎnyuèhútòng (collaboration with BenBen and Yangfan) (2018)

=== Live recordings ===
- Rhythm n' Drone | 節奏與嗡鳴 (with The Offset: Spectacles) (2017)
- Rhythm n' Drone II | 節奏與嗡鳴二 (with Hot & Cold and The Offset: Spectacles) (2018)
- Rytme Og Drone III | 節奏與嗡鳴三 (with Anton Rothstein and Angel Wei Bernild) (2020)
