= The Gongs =

Former Ohio experimental folk group

- Origin: Oberlin, Ohio
- Genres: Experimental music, folk, electronic
- Years active: 2001–2002
- Label: American Patchwork
- Past members: Peter Blasser; Clara Latham; Grisha Krivchenia; Stefan Tcherepnin
- Website: http://imomus.com/thegongs.html

The Gongs were an experimental folk quartet formed in September 2001. Their music is characterised by being played with homemade instruments and electronic equipment.

== History ==
The Gongs were formed in September 2001 by Peter Blasser, Clara Latham, and Stefan Tcherepnin - three Oberlin College students - and named themselves The Gongs because "when we found our first collection of steel gongs near the train tracks, they taught us how to imitate the sounds that animals hear, as can be heard in "the bat", and "an old man talks to his dog". Now we always play with a set of amplified gongs."

Their music caught the attention of artist and musician Momus in October 2001, and The Gongs - now a quartet - signed to his then-newly started label American Patchwork Records, and started producing their first album. The Gongs released their EP "7 Step" around this time. In June 2002, their debut album Rob Reich was released, and The Gongs started touring with the rest of American Patchwork, including artists such as Phiiliip, Super Madrigal Brothers, Rroland, and Momus himself. The tour lasted until July 2002, and The Gongs broke up shortly afterwards.

== Discography ==
- 7 Step (Self-released, 2002)
- Rob Reich (American Patchwork, 2002)
