= Emperor Gong =

Emperor Gong (恭帝 Gongdi, "Reverent Emperor") may refer to:

- Emperor Gong of Jin (386–421)
- Emperor Gong of Western Wei (537–557)
- Yang You (605–619), referred to as Emperor Gong of Sui
- Yang Tong (605–619), Yang You's brother, sometimes also referred to as Emperor Gong of Sui
- Chai Zongxun (953–973), Emperor Gong of Later Zhou
- Emperor Gong of Song (1271–1323?)

== See also ==
- Gong (disambiguation)
