= Prince Gong =

Qing dynasty prince and statesman (1833–1898)

Yixin
- Prince Gong of the First Rank
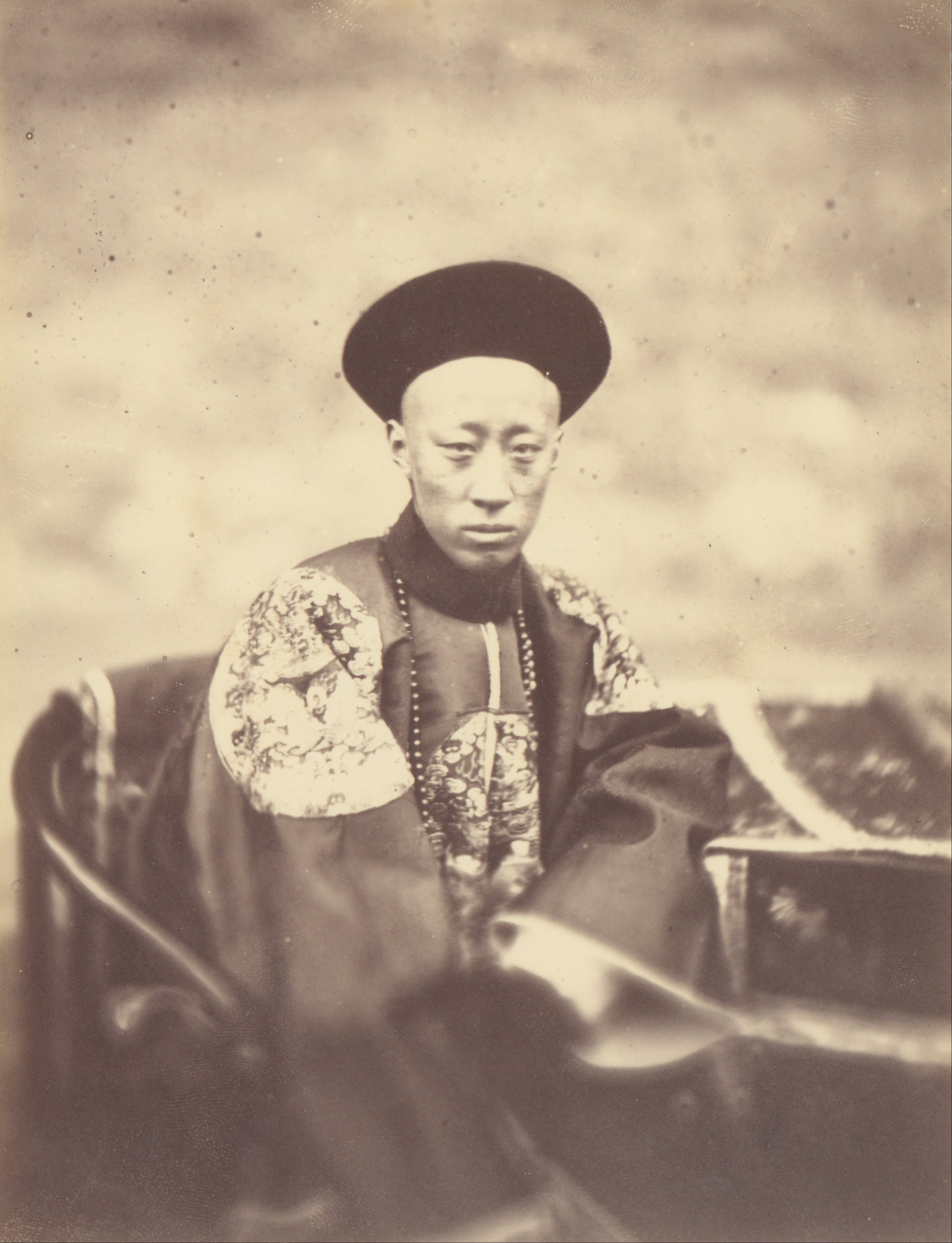
- Prince Gong, shortly after the signing of the Convention of Peking, 1860

Prince Gong of the First Rank
- Tenure: 25 February 1850 – 29 May 1898
- Successor: Puwei

Chief Grand Councillor
- In office: 4 October 1853 – 6 September 1855
- Predecessor: Qi Junzao
- Successor: Wenqing
- In office: 8 November 1861 – 8 April 1884
- Predecessor: Muyin
- Successor: Shiduo
- In office: 16 November 1894 – 29 May 1898
- Predecessor: Shiduo
- Successor: Shiduo
- Born: 11 January 1833; Beijing, Qing dynasty
- Died: 29 May 1898 (aged 65); Beijing, Qing dynasty
- Consorts: Lady Gūwalgiya (m. 1848; died 1880)
- Issue: Zaicheng; Zaiying; Princess Rongshou of the First Rank
Names
- Aisin Gioro Yixin (愛新覺羅 奕訢); Manchu: I-hin (ᡳ ᡥᡳᠨ)
Posthumous name
- Prince Gongzhong of the First Rank
- House: Aisin Gioro
- Father: Daoguang Emperor
- Mother: Empress Xiaojingcheng

Yixin (11 January 1833 – 29 May 1898), better known in English as Prince Gong or Kung, was an imperial prince of the Aisin Gioro clan and an important statesman of the Manchu-led Qing dynasty in China. He was a regent of the empire from 1861 to 1865 and wielded great influence at other times as well. He was one of the twelve iron cap princes of the Qing Dynasty.

Yixin was a man of great talent, excelling in both literature and martial skills, and was among the most capable members of the imperial family. However, he was never favored by his father, the Daoguang Emperor, to succeed to the throne, which meant he spent his life in the role of a political aide rather than a ruler. In 1860, during the Second Opium War, when the British and French forces invaded Beijing, Yixin was entrusted with negotiating peace and signed the Convention of Beijing on behalf of the Qing court. In 1861, after the death of his elder brother, the Xianfeng Emperor, Yixin, in collaboration with Empress Dowager Cixi, launched the Xinyou Coup, seizing power from the eight regents appointed in the late emperor's will. He and Empress Dowager Cixi jointly took charge of the state affairs. In 1881, after the death of his supporter, Empress Dowager Ci'an, Yixin's position began to weaken. In 1884, Cixi removed him from all his positions, forcing him into political retirement. In 1894, during the First Sino-Japanese War, Yixin was called back into service, and he died four years later in 1898.

Yixin was an important figure and leader of the Self-Strengthening Movement during the late Qing period. He supported figures like Zhang Zhidong, Li Hongzhang, and Zeng Guofan in their efforts to modernize military industries, procure advanced weaponry, and promote the development of modern military infrastructure. He also helped establish the Zongli Yamen, which was responsible for foreign affairs, and set up Chinese embassies abroad. His diplomatic and modernization efforts gained the recognition of foreign powers. Yixin played a significant role in resolving the crises of the Second Opium War and the Taiping Rebellion, and he actively promoted modernization, which led to a brief period of political stability and revitalization for the Qing government. However, his considerable influence and abilities often made him a target of the ruling elites and conservatives, leading to repeated conflicts with Emperor Xianfeng, Emperor Tongzhi, and Empress Dowager Cixi. As a result, his political career was marked by a series of ups and downs, ultimately ending with his complete dismissal.

Yixin's tomb is located in Changping District, Beijing. After his death, the title of Prince Gong was passed on to his eldest grandson, Puwei.

== Names ==
Personal names

Yixin
- Traditional Chinese: 奕訢
- Simplified Chinese: 奕䜣
Transcriptions
Standard Mandarin
- Hanyu Pinyin: Yìxīn
- Wade–Giles: I-hsin

Art Name
- Traditional Chinese: 樂道堂主人
- Simplified Chinese: 乐道堂主人
- Literal meaning: Master of the Hall of the Way of Music
Transcriptions
Standard Mandarin
- Hanyu Pinyin: Yuèdàotáng zhǔrén

Devil #6
- Chinese: 鬼子六
Transcriptions
Standard Mandarin
- Hanyu Pinyin: Guǐzǐ Lìu

Manchu name
- Manchu script: ᡳ ᡥᡳᠨ
- Romanization: I-hin

Titles

Prince Gong
- Traditional Chinese: 恭親王
- Simplified Chinese: 恭亲王
- Literal meaning: The Respectful Prince of the Blood
Transcriptions
Standard Mandarin
- Hanyu Pinyin: Gōng qīnwáng
- Wade–Giles: Kung Ch‘in-wang

Sixth Prince
- Chinese: 六皇子
Transcriptions
Standard Mandarin
- Hanyu Pinyin: Lìu huángzǐ

Posthumous Name
- Traditional Chinese: 恭忠親王
- Simplified Chinese: 恭忠亲王
- Literal meaning: The Respectful and Loyal Prince of the Blood
Transcriptions
Standard Mandarin
- Hanyu Pinyin: Gōngzhōng qīnwáng
- Wade–Giles: Kung-chung Ch‘in-wang

Yixin is the pinyin romanization of the Mandarin pronunciation of his Manchu name I-hin. He shared his surname Aisin Gioro with the other members of the Qing imperial family. His courtesy or art name was "Master of the Yuedao Hall" or "Hall of the Way of Music".

Kung is the Wade-Giles romanization of Mandarin pronunciation of the same Chinese character 恭, now spelt Gōng in pinyin. It is not really a name but a part of a descriptive title — "The Respectful Prince of the Blood" — previously borne by Changning, the fifth son of the Shunzhi Emperor. The Chinese title 王 translates literally as "king" but is usually understood as a "prince" in terms of the imperial Chinese nobility. Because Changning's rank had not been given "iron-cap" status, each generation of his descendants were reduced in rank unless they somehow proved themselves anew and earned a new title of their own. Yixin, however, was given "iron-cap" status and his direct heirs inherited his full title as well. In English, however, it is usually misunderstood as a name: Prince Kung in older sources and Prince Gong in newer ones. He was also sometimes known as the "Sixth Prince" or, less flatteringly, "Devil #6". He was posthumously known as "the Respectful and Loyal Prince of the Blood": Prince Kung-chung or Gongzhong.

== Life ==
=== Early life ===
Yixin was born in the Aisin Gioro clan, the imperial clan of the Manchu-led Qing dynasty, as the sixth son of the Daoguang Emperor. He was the third son of his mother, Imperial Noble Consort Jing, who was from the Khorchin Mongol Borjigit clan. He studied in the imperial library and practised martial arts with his fourth brother, Yizhu. He created 28 qiang (spear) movements and 18 dao (sword) movements, which were respectively named "Lihua Xieli" (棣華協力) and "Bao'e Xuanwei" (寶鍔宣威) by his father. His father also gave him a White Rainbow Sword (白虹刀) as a gift.

Yixin was mentored by Zhuo Bingtian (卓秉恬) and Jia Zhen (賈楨), two eminent scholar-officials who obtained the position of jinshi (進士; successful candidate) in the imperial examination in 1802 and 1826 respectively.

In 1850, when the Daoguang Emperor became critically ill, he summoned Zaiquan (載銓), Zaiyuan, Duanhua, Sengge Rinchen, Mujangga, He Rulin (何汝霖), Chen Fu'en (陳孚恩) and Ji Zhichang (季芝昌) to Shende Hall (慎德堂) in the Old Summer Palace, where he revealed to them a secret edict he wrote previously. According to the edict, the Fourth Prince, Yizhu, would become the new emperor while Yixin, the Sixth Prince, would be made a qinwang (first-rank prince). He died on the same day. However, it is rumored that Yixin was the real successor emperor, and the secret decree have been tampered with.

=== Under the Xianfeng Emperor ===
Yizhu ascended the throne in 1850 after the death of the Daoguang Emperor and adopted the regnal title "Xianfeng"; he is thus historically known as the Xianfeng Emperor. In accordance with their father's secret edict, the newly enthroned Xianfeng Emperor granted Yixin the title "Prince Gong of the First Rank" (恭親王) in the same year. In 1851, the Xianfeng Emperor established an office for Prince Gong, gave him permission to enter the inner imperial court, assigned him to be in charge of patrol and defence matters, and ordered him to continue carrying the White Rainbow Sword given to him by their father.

In October 1853, as the Taiping rebels closed in on Jinan (畿南; the area south of the Hai River), Prince Gong was appointed to the Grand Council, which was in charge of military affairs. The following year, he received three additional appointments: dutong (都統; Banner Commander), you zongzheng (右宗正; Right Director of the Imperial Clan Court) and zongling (宗令; Head of the Imperial Clan Court). He was publicly praised in May 1855 after the Taiping rebels were driven out of Jinan.

When Prince Gong's mother died in August 1855, the Xianfeng Emperor reprimanded Prince Gong for failing to observe court protocol and removed him from the Grand Council and his zongling and dutong appointments. However, Prince Gong was still permitted to enter the inner imperial court and the imperial library. He was restored to his position as a dutong in June 1856, and further appointed as an Interior Minister (內大臣) in May 1859.

=== Second Opium War ===
In September 1860, during the Second Opium War, as British and French forces closed in on the capital Beijing, the Xianfeng Emperor ordered Zaiyuan and Muyin (穆廕) to negotiate for peace at Tongzhou with British and French officials. An Anglo-French delegation sent to negotiate with Chinese officials, which included Harry Smith Parkes and Henry Loch, was taken prisoner by soldiers led by Mongol general Sengge Rinchen during the negotiations. Rinchen then led mounted Mongol troops to attack a Franco-British force at the Battle of Palikao but was defeated. The Xianfeng Emperor recalled Zaiyuan and Muyin from Tongzhou, fled from Beijing with most members of his imperial court to Rehe Province, and appointed Prince Gong as an Imperial Commissioner with Discretion and Full Authority (欽差便宜行事全權大臣).

Prince Gong moved to Changxindian (長辛店; in present-day Fengtai District, Beijing) and called for an assembly of the troops stationed there to enforce greater discipline and raise their morale. On one hand, Qinghui (慶惠) suggested to the Xianfeng Emperor to release Parkes and let Prince Gong continue negotiating. On the other hand, Yidao (義道) urged the emperor to surrender Beijing to the British and French. In the meantime, Anglo-French expeditionary forces captured the Old Summer Palace in the northwest of Beijing, which they proceeded to sack and burn.

On 24 October 1860, Prince Gong concluded the negotiations with British, French and Russian officials, signing the Convention of Peking on behalf of the Qing dynasty. He subsequently wrote a memorial to the Xianfeng Emperor, requesting to be punished for signing an unequal treaty. The emperor replied, "The responsibility assigned to Prince Gong to carry on peace negotiations is not an easy one to shoulder. I deeply understand the difficult situation he was put into. There is no need to punish him." Prince Gong settled the diplomatic affairs in Beijing by the end of 1860.

In 1861, Prince Gong set up the Zongli Yamen, which functioned as the Qing government's de facto foreign affairs ministry, and placed Guiliang (桂良) and Wenxiang in charge of it. He wrote a memorial to the Xianfeng Emperor, proposing to enhance the training of Banner Troops in Beijing and let Qing troops stationed in Jilin and Heilongjiang provinces train with the Imperial Russian Army and stockpile military supplies. The generals Shengbao (勝保), Jingchun (景淳) and others were ordered to oversee training of Qing troops stationed in Beijing and northeast China.

=== Under the Tongzhi Emperor ===
==== Xinyou Coup ====
Before the Xianfeng Emperor died in August 1861 in the Chengde Mountain Resort, he appointed a group of eight regents – led by Zaiyuan, Duanhua and Sushun – to assist his underage son and successor, Zaichun. Yixin's flexible attitude towards dealing with the Western powers had put him at odds with the eight regents, who were politically conservative and opposed to Western influence. Upon request, Prince Gong was granted permission to travel to Chengde to attend the funeral. In Chengde, he met the Empress Dowagers Ci'an and Cixi and told them about how the eight regents monopolised state power. When the Xianfeng Emperor's coffin arrived back in Beijing in November 1861, Prince Gong and the two empress dowagers launched a coup – historically known as the Xinyou Coup (辛酉政變) – to oust the eight regents from power. The regents were arrested and removed from their positions of power.

==== As Prince-Regent ====
Zaichun, who was enthroned as the "Tongzhi Emperor", appointed Prince Gong as Prince-Regent (議政王) and granted him some special privileges. These privileges included: "iron-cap" status awarded to the Prince Gong title/peerage; an increment in salary to twice that of a normal qinwang (first-rank prince); exemptions from having to kowtow in the emperor's presence and having to write his name on memorials submitted to the emperor. Prince Gong firmly declined to accept the "iron-cap" privilege, and instead sought to be concurrently appointed as zongling (宗令; Head of the Imperial Clan Court) and put in charge of the Shenjiying (a firearms-equipped unit in the Qing army). The two empress dowagers also ordered Prince Gong to supervise Hongde Hall (弘德殿; a hall in the Forbidden City), where the Tongzhi Emperor studied.

In 1864, Qing forces finally suppressed the Taiping Rebellion after a war lasting more than a decade, and recaptured Jiangning (江寧; in present-day Nanjing) from the rebels. The imperial court issued a decree to praise Prince Gong for his effective leadership in the regency that led to the end of the rebellion – in addition to conferring more prestigious titles on his sons Zaicheng, Zaijun and Zaiying.

As the longstanding leader of the Zongli Yamen, which he established in 1861, Prince Gong was responsible for spearheading various reforms in the early stages of the Self-Strengthening Movement, a series of measures and policy changes implemented by the Qing government with the aim of modernising China. He also founded the Tongwen Guan in 1862 for Chinese scholars to study technology and foreign languages.

==== Fall from grace ====
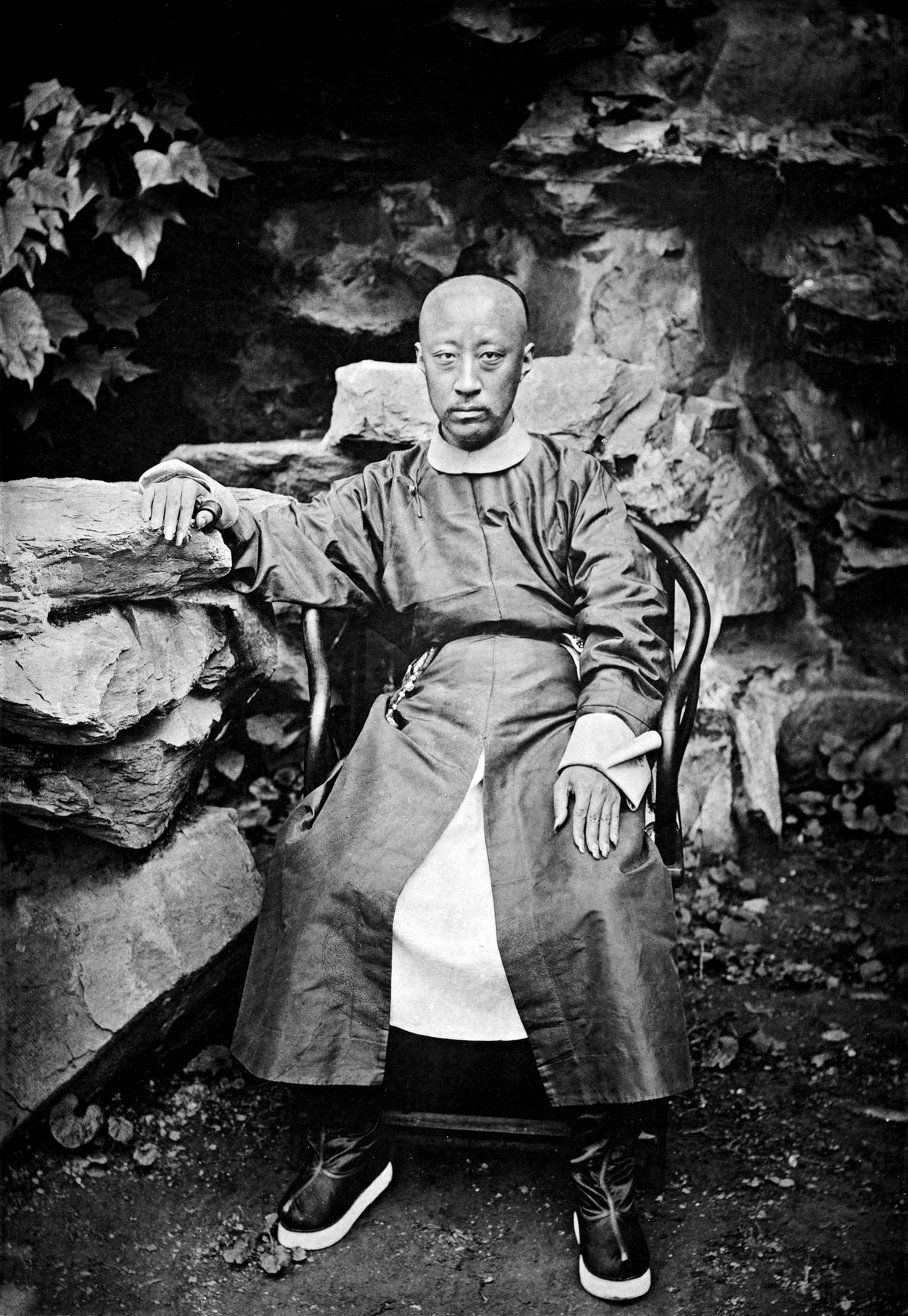
Photo of a 39- or 40-year-old Prince Gong, taken by John Thomson in 1872 at the prince's residence.

Around April 1865, an official, Cai Shouqi (蔡壽祺), accused Prince Gong of "monopolising state power, accepting bribes, practising favouritism, behaving arrogantly, and showing disrespect towards the Emperor". The Empress Dowagers Ci'an and Cixi publicly reprimanded Prince Gong and stripped him of his position as Prince-Regent. Yishen (奕脤), Yixuan, Wang Zheng (王拯), Sun Yimou (孫翼謀), Yin Zhaoyong (殷兆鏞), Pan Zuyin, Wang Weizhen (王維珍), Guangcheng (廣誠) and others pleaded with the empress dowagers to pardon Prince Gong and make him Prince-Regent again. Although the empress dowagers did not restore Prince Gong as Prince-Regent, they permitted him to remain in the inner imperial court and continue running the Zongli Yamen. Prince Gong personally thanked the empress dowagers and made a tearful apology. The empress dowagers issued a decree announcing: "The Prince practised favouritism. As we are bound by a common cause and have high expectations of him, we cannot show leniency in punishing him. He will still be allowed to oversee the Grand Council."

In March 1868, as the Nian rebels approached the suburbs of Beijing, Prince Gong was tasked with mobilising troops and managing defence arrangements. He was also appointed as you zongzheng (右宗正; Right Director of the Imperial Clan Court).

In 1869, An Dehai, a court eunuch and close aide of Empress Dowager Cixi, was arrested and executed in Shandong Province by Ding Baozhen, the provincial governor. This was because it was a capital crime for eunuchs to travel out of the Forbidden City without authorisation. The empress dowager became more suspicious of Prince Gong because she believed that he instigated Ding Baozhen to execute An Dehai.

==== Demotion and restoration ====
In October 1872, when the Tongzhi Emperor married the Jiashun Empress, he granted Prince Gong the "iron-cap" privilege again. He officially took over the reins of power from his regents in around February 1873. In the same year, Prince Gong displeased Empress Dowager Cixi when he strongly opposed her plan to rebuild the Old Summer Palace.

In August 1874, Prince Gong was reprimanded and punished again for failing to observe court protocol. This time, he was demoted from a qinwang (first-rank prince) to a junwang (second-rank prince). Zaicheng, Prince Gong's eldest son, also lost his beile title. Despite his demotion, Prince Gong was still allowed to remain in the Grand Council. The following day, the empress dowagers ordered Prince Gong and Zaicheng to be restored as a qinwang and beile respectively. Towards the end of the year, the Tongzhi Emperor increased Prince Gong's salary by more than twice that of a normal qinwang, but died not long later in around December.

=== Under the Guangxu Emperor ===
The Guangxu Emperor, who succeeded the Tongzhi Emperor in 1875, continued the practices of exempting Prince Gong from having to kowtow in the emperor's presence and having to write his name on memorials submitted to the emperor. Prince Gong was also appointed as zongling (宗令; Head of the Imperial Clan Court).

==== Sino-French War ====
In 1884, when the French invaded Vietnam, Prince Gong and the members of the Grand Council were unable to arrive at a decision on whether or not to intervene in Vietnam and go to war with the French. As a consequence, Empress Dowager Cixi reprimanded Prince Gong and his colleagues for their dispirited and indecisive attitude towards the war, and removed them from their positions. Prince Gong stopped receiving his double salary and was ordered to retire to recuperate from illness. However, he started receiving his double salary again from November 1886 and was allowed to receive his share of the offerings from ceremonial events. He remained in Jietai Temple in western Beijing for most of the time.

Prince Gong's seventh brother, Yixuan (Prince Chun), replaced him as the head of the Grand Council. Some officials such as Baojun (寶鋆), Li Hongzao, Jinglian (景廉) and Weng Tonghe, who previously served in Prince Gong's administration, were also dismissed from office. The incident is known as the "Cabinet Change of Jiashen" (甲申易樞) or "Political Change of Jiashen" (甲申朝局之變) because it took place in the jiashen year according to the Chinese sexagenary cycle.

==== First Sino-Japanese War ====
In October 1894, after the Japanese invaded Korea and the situation became dire, Empress Dowager Cixi summoned Prince Gong back to the imperial court, and made him, along with Prince Qing, the co-head of the Zongli Yamen, the Admiralty, and the board of war operations. He was also made high commissioner of the Peking Field Force, putting him in overall command of the capital's defenses. In December 1894 Prince Gong was also made the president of the Grand Council. Although Prince Gong had been recalled to politics, Empress Dowager Cixi also decreed that since he had not yet recovered from illness, he was exempted from having to constantly attend court sessions.

=== Death ===
In 1898, Prince Gong was appointed as zongling again, but he became critically ill by the end of April. Empress Dowager Cixi visited him three times during this period of time. He eventually died at the age of 67 (by East Asian age reckoning) in May.

The Guangxu Emperor personally attended Prince Gong's funeral and, as a sign of mourning, cancelled imperial court sessions for five days and ordered mourning attire to be worn for 15 days. The emperor also granted Prince Gong the posthumous name "Zhong" (忠; literally "loyal"), gave him a place in the Imperial Ancestral Temple, and issued an edict honouring Prince Gong as a role model of loyalty that all Qing subjects should learn from.

== Family ==
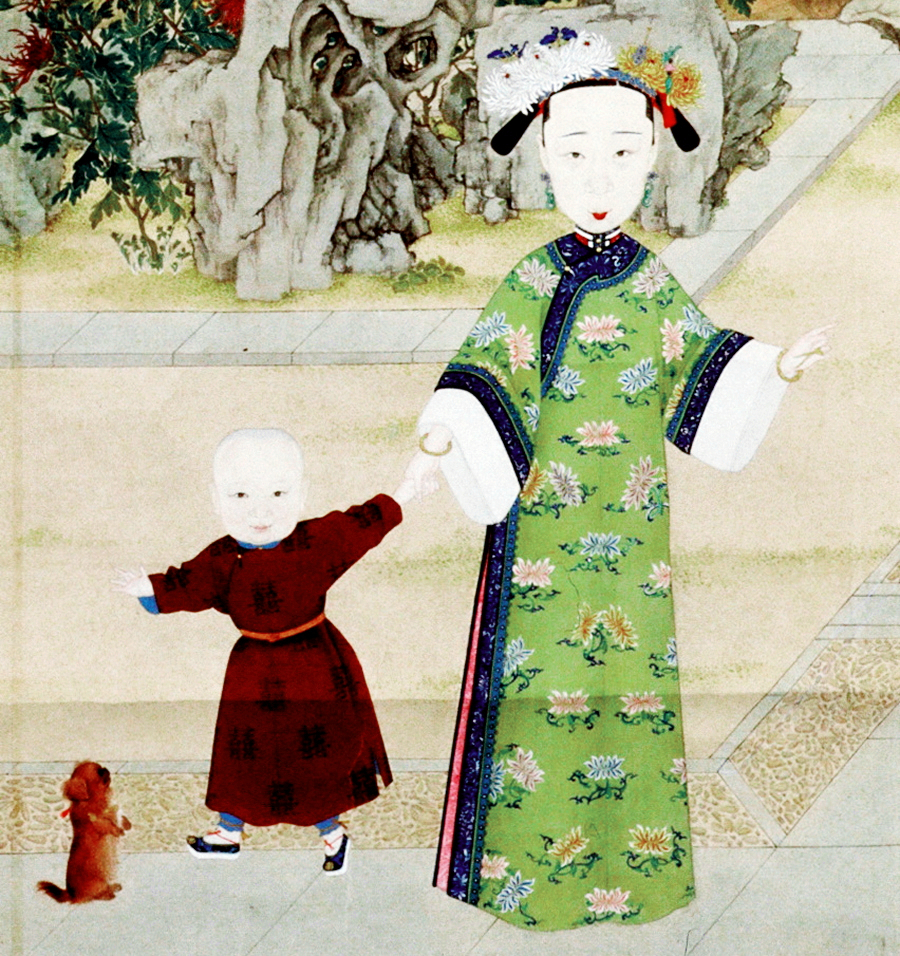
Empress Xiaojingcheng and Prince Gong

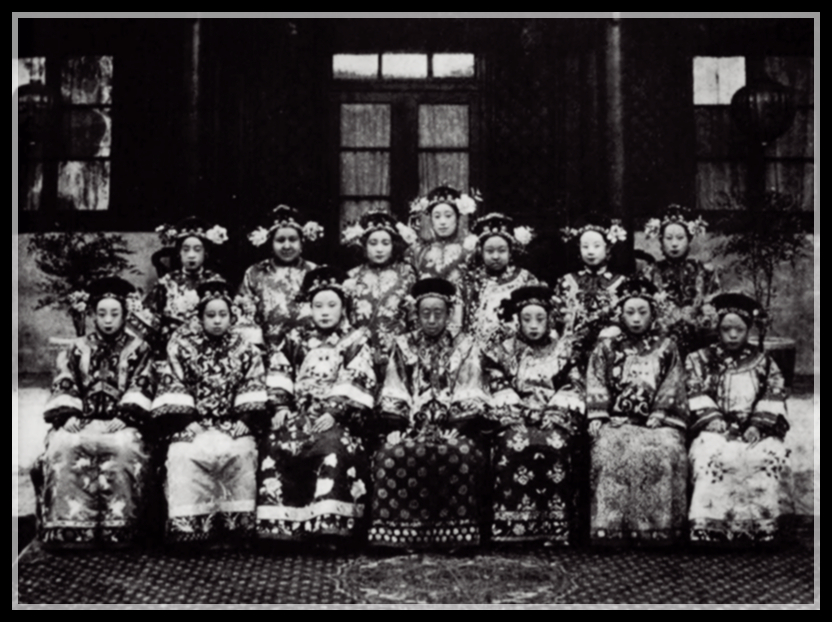
Gulun Princess Rongshou (centre, seated)

Primary Consort

- Imperial Princess Consort Gongzhong, of the Gūwalgiya clan (恭忠亲王妃 瓜爾佳氏; 1834 – 29 June 1880)
  - Princess Rongshou of the First Rank (榮壽固倫公主; 28 February 1854 – 24 December 1924), first daughter, later adopted by Empress Xiaoqinxian
    - Married Zhiduan (志端; d. 1871) of the Manchu Fuca clan on 15 October 1866
  - Zaicheng, Prince Guomin of the Third Rank (果敏貝勒 載澂; 12 September 1858 – 21 July 1885), first son
  - Second daughter (15 March 1860 – 28 March 1864)
  - Zaijun, Duke of the Second Rank (輔國公 載濬; 31 July 1864 – 6 June 1866), third son

Secondary Consort

- Secondary consort, of the Xuegiya clan (側福晉 薛佳氏)
  - Zaiying, Prince of the Third Rank (貝勒 載瀅; 11 March 1861 – 29 September 1909), second son
- Secondary consort, of the Liugiya clan (側福晉 劉佳氏)
  - Third daughter (6 March 1879 – 12 June 1880)
  - Lady of the First Rank (郡君; 24 July 1884 – 6 March 1909), fifth daughter
- Secondary consort, of the Liugiya clan (側福晉 劉佳氏)
  - Zaihuang, Duke of the Fourth Rank (不入八分輔國公 載潢; 11 November 1880 – 3 March 1885), fourth son
- Secondary consort, of the Janggiya clan (側福晉 張佳氏; 1858 – 4 October 1883)
  - Fourth daughter (31 August 1881 – 8 September 1882)

=== Grandchildren ===
- First grandson Puwei (溥偉, 1880-1936), Prince Gongxian of the First Rank (1880–1936), biological son of Zaiying, adopted by Zaicheng
- Second grandson: Puru (溥儒, 1896-1963)
- Third grandson: Puyou (溥佑, 1899-1969)
- Fourth grandson: Puhui (溥僡, 1906-1963)

== Legacy ==
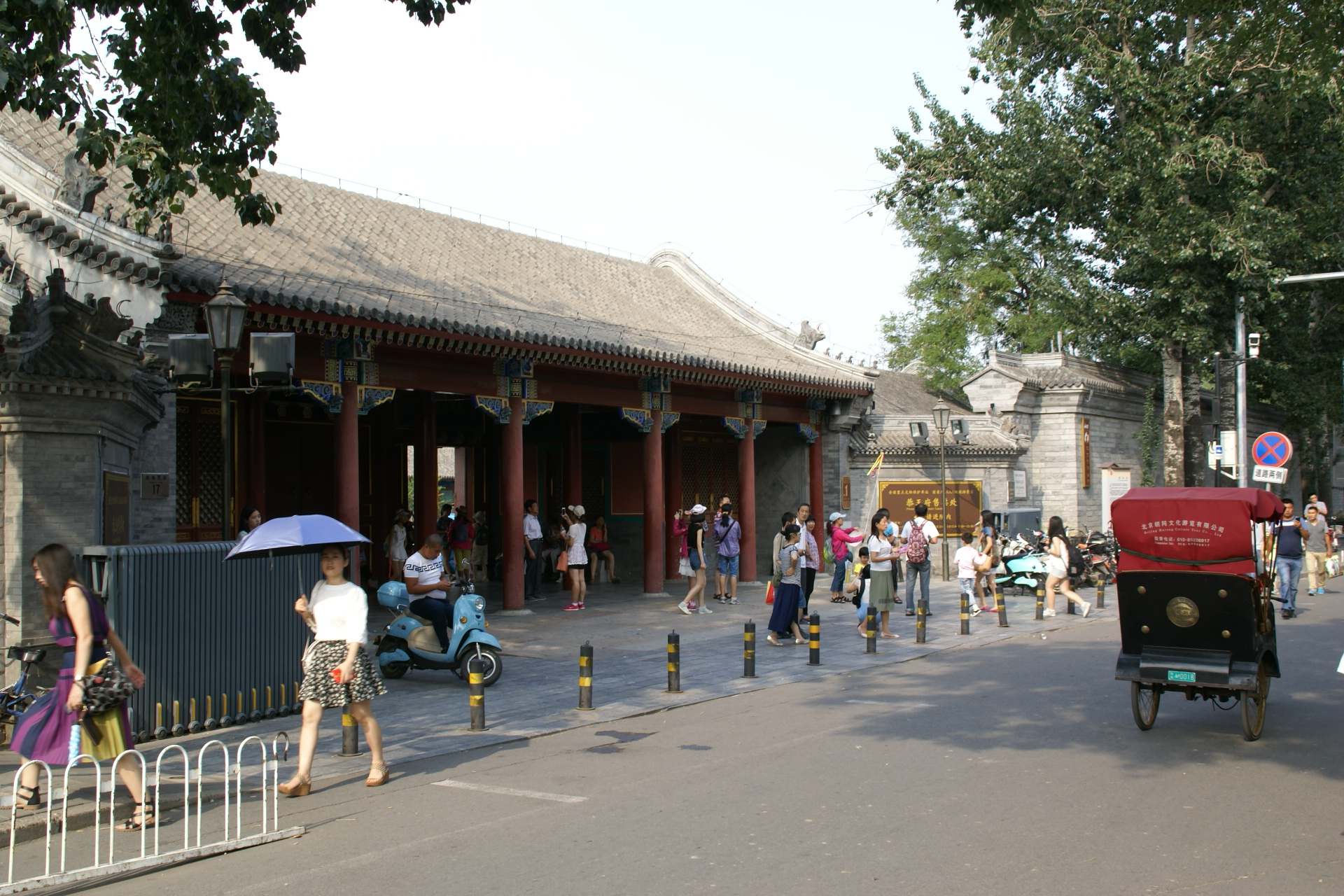
Prince Gong Mansion

Prince Gong's former residence in Xicheng District, Beijing is now open to the public as a museum and garden park. It was previously the residence of the notoriously corrupt official Heshen.

In 2006, Prince Gong's life was adapted into a Chinese television series, Sigh of His Highness, starring Chen Baoguo as the prince.

== See also ==
- Royal and noble ranks of the Qing dynasty
- Ranks of imperial consorts in China § Qing

Prince Gong Qing dynasty Born: 11 January 1833 Died: 29 May 1898
Preceded by None. Title created.	Prince Gong of the First Rank; 1850-1898	Succeeded by Puwei
