= Duke Gong =

Duke Gong (Chinese: 共公; pinyin: Gōng Gōng) may refer to:

- Duke Gong of Cao (Chinese: 曹共公; pinyin: Cáo Gòng Gōng; died 618 BC), ruler of the Cao (曹)
- Duke Gong of Chen (Chinese: 陳共公; pinyin: Chén Gòng Gōng; died 614 BC), ruler of the Chen (陳)
- Duke Gong of Qin (Chinese: 秦共公; pinyin: Qín Gōng Gōng; died 604 BC), ruler of the Qin (秦)
- Duke Gong of Song (Chinese: 宋共公; pinyin: Sòng Gōng Gōng; died 557 BC), ruler of the Song (state) (宋)
- Duke Gong of Zheng (Chinese: 鄭共公; pinyin: Zhèng Gōng Gōng; died 424 BC), ruler of the Zheng (state) (鄭)

== See also ==
- Gong (disambiguation)
