= Prince Gong's Mansion =

Historic residence and museum in Beijing, China

Coordinates: 39°56′11.52″N 116°22′45.53″E

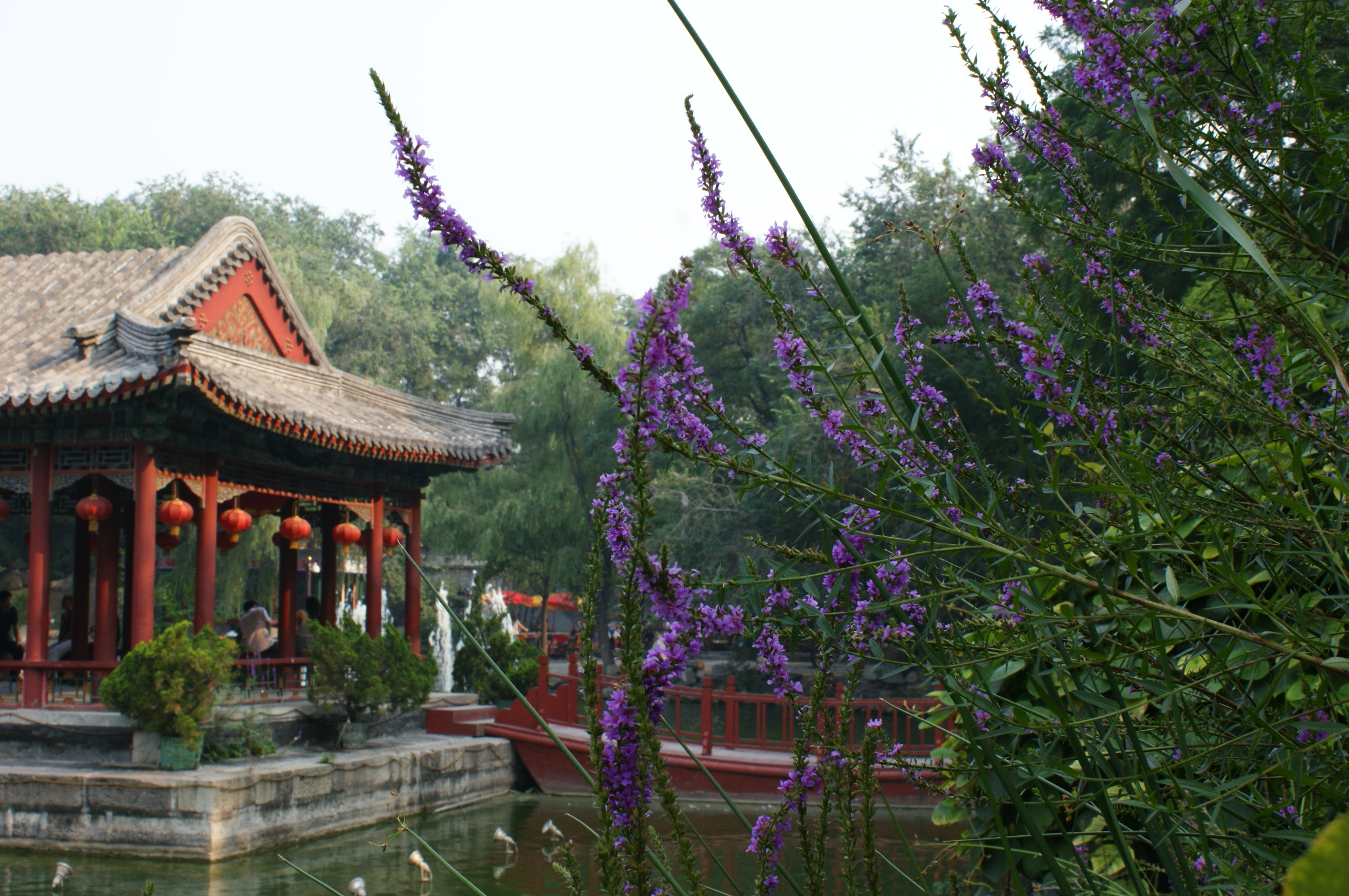
- Chinese: 恭王府
- Literal meaning: Official Residence of the Respectful Prince
Transcriptions
Standard Mandarin
- Hanyu Pinyin: Gōngwáng Fǔ

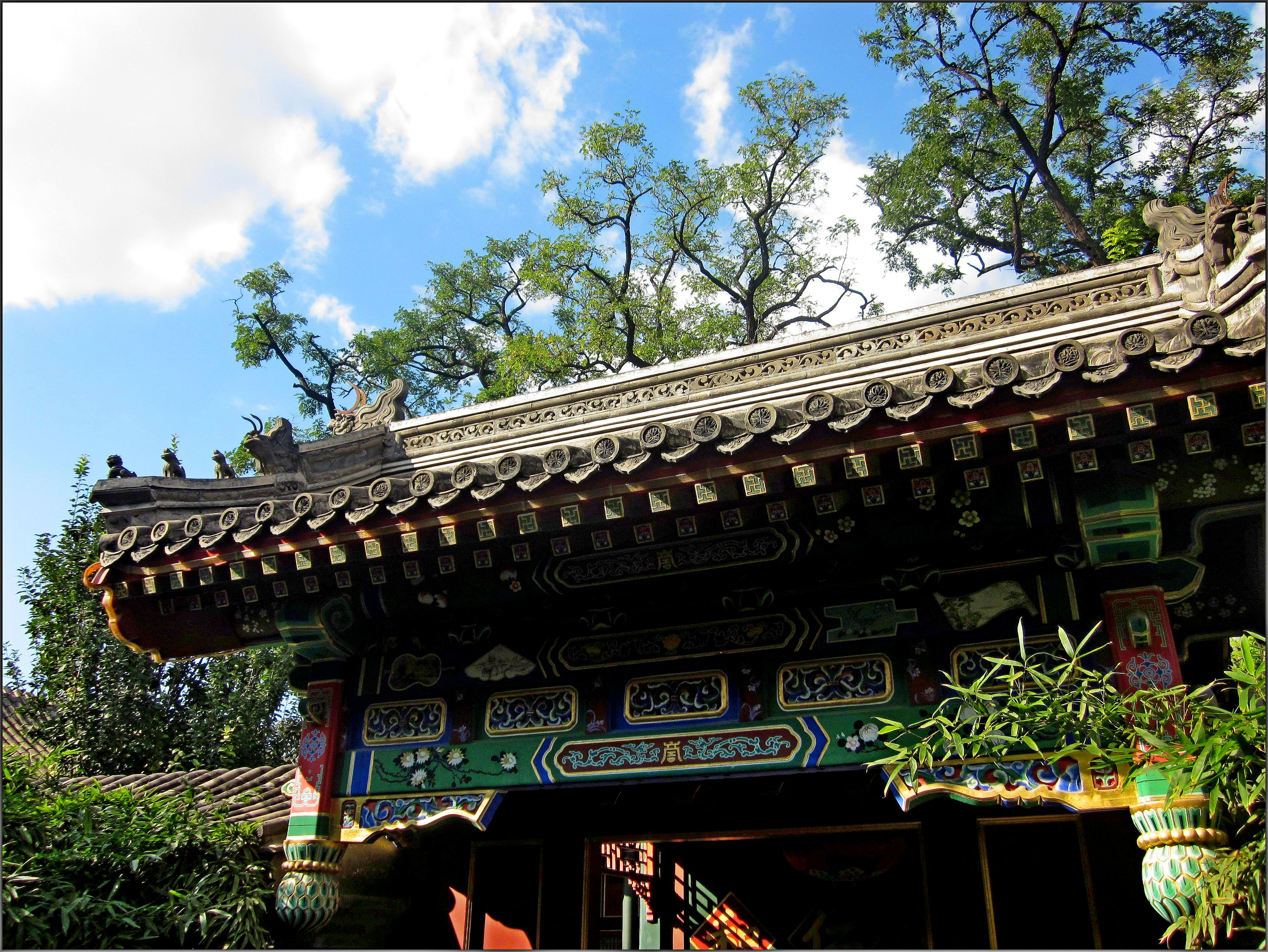
Prince Gong Mansion

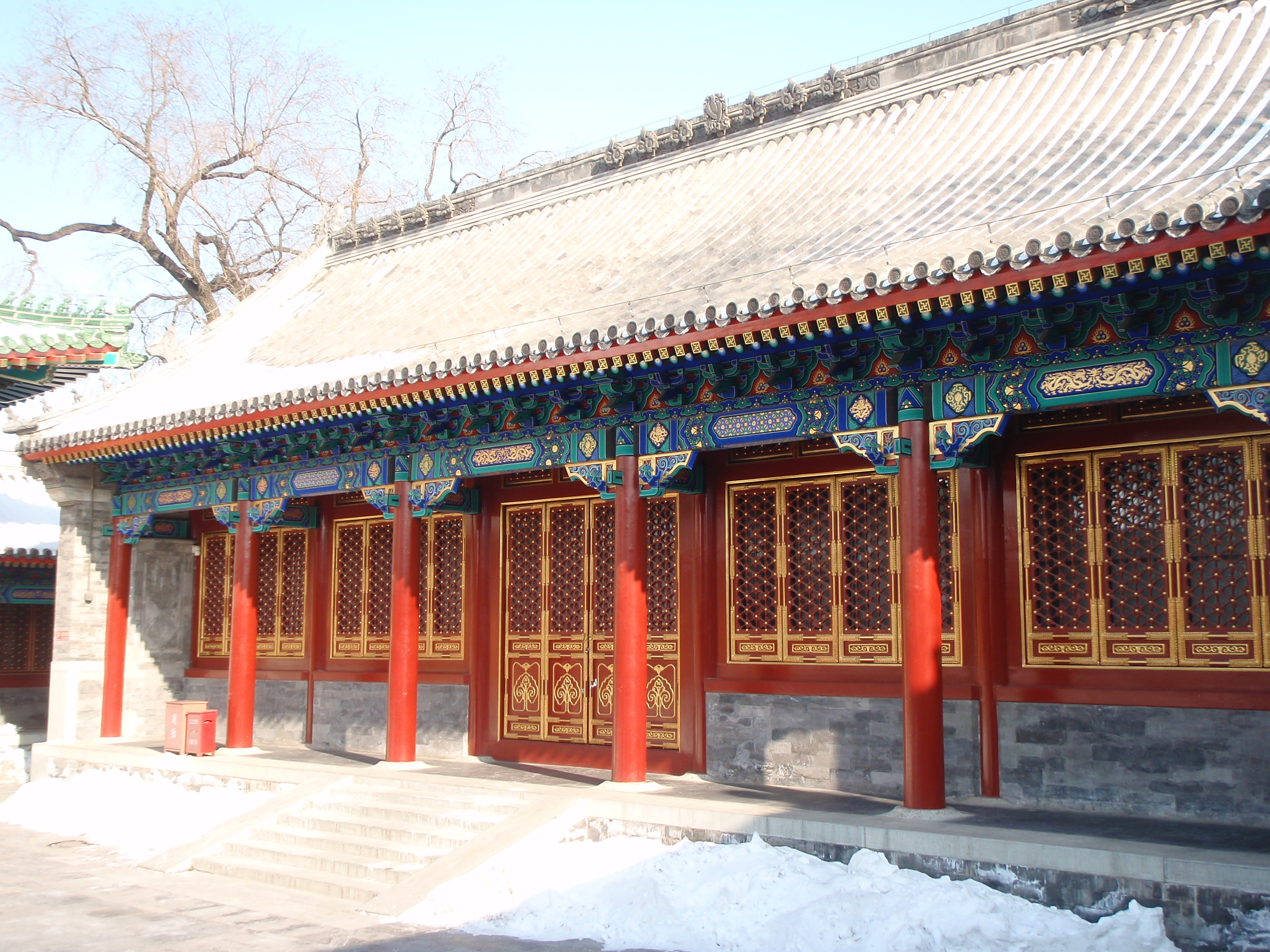
The mansion with snow

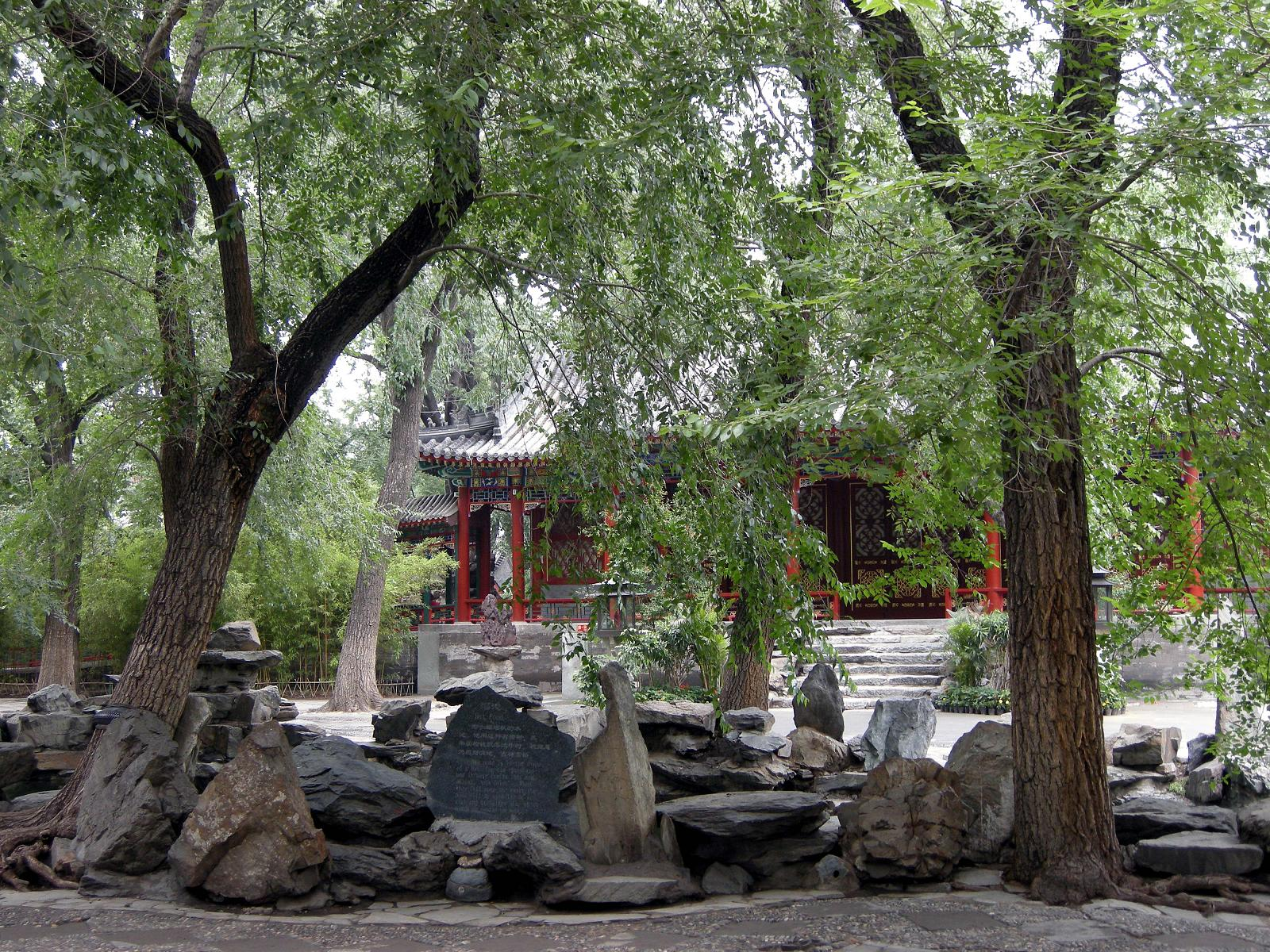
The library at the mansion

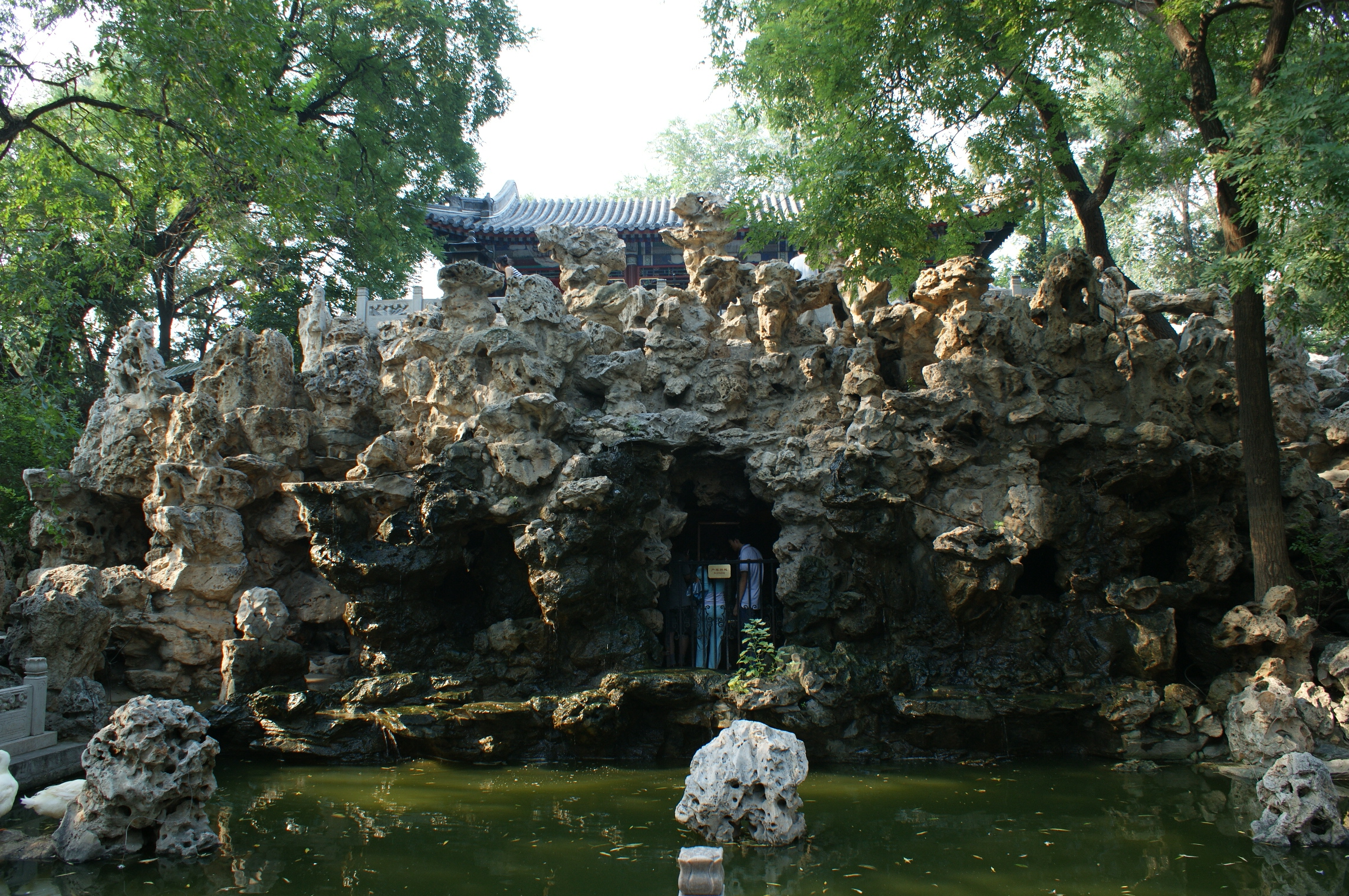
Classical Suzhou gardening style

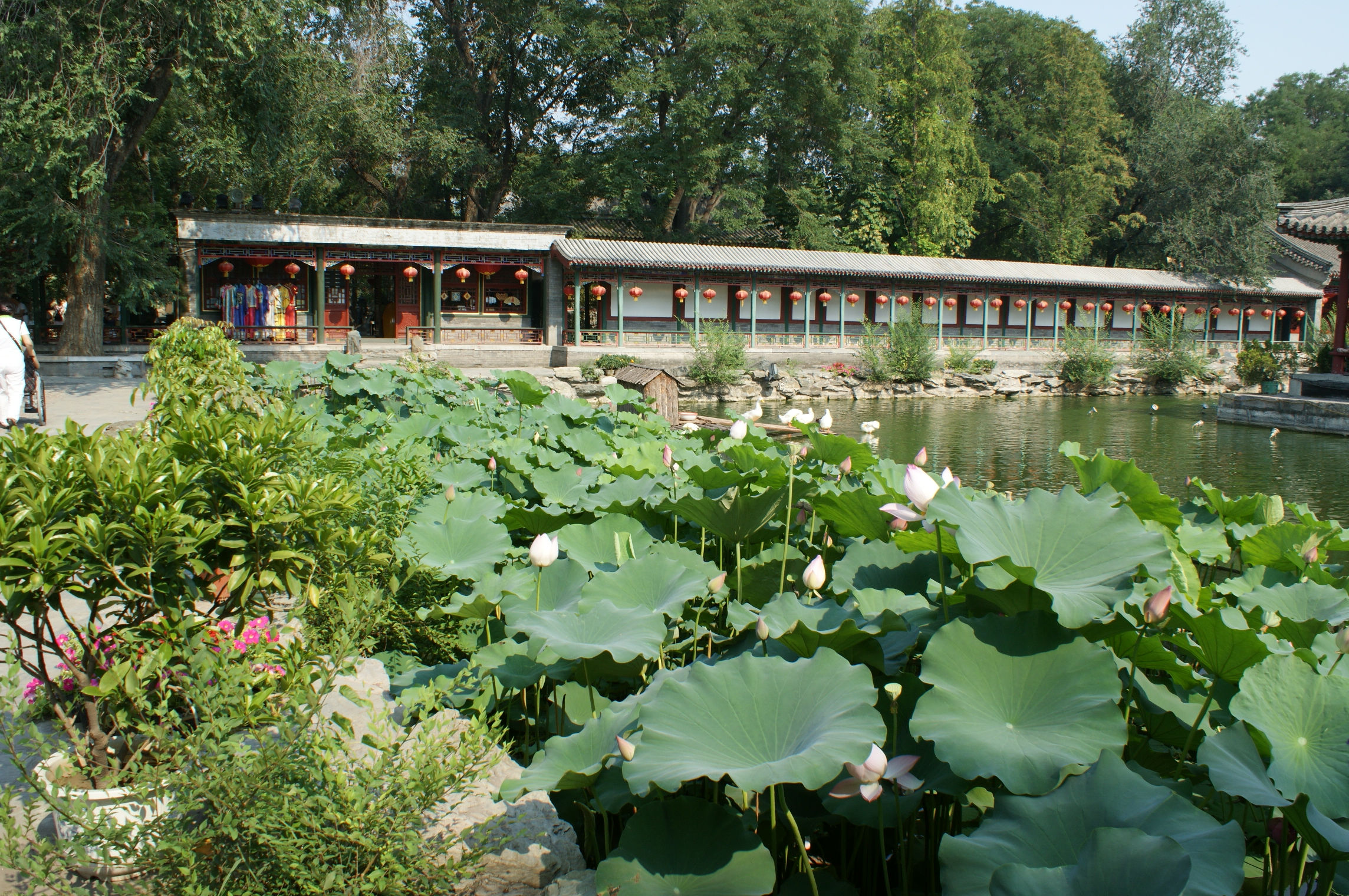
A corridor at the mansion

Prince Gong's Mansion, also known as the Prince Kung Mansion, is a museum and tourist attraction located in Xicheng District, Beijing, just north of the Shichahai Lake. It consists of large siheyuan-style mansions and gardens. Originally constructed for Heshen, an official renowned for being the most corrupt official in Chinese history, it was later renamed after Prince Gong, a Manchu prince and influential statesman of the late Qing dynasty, who inhabited the mansion in the late 19th century.

== Name ==
"Kung" is the older, Wade-Giles romanization of the same Chinese character spelled "gong" in pinyin. It was not Yixin's personal name, but a title meaning the "Respectful" Prince or King.

== History ==
Prince Gong's Mansion was constructed in 1777 during the Qing dynasty for Heshen, a prominent court official in the reign of the Qianlong Emperor renowned for being the most corrupt official in Chinese history. From a young age, Heshen earned the favor of the Qianlong Emperor and rose swiftly through the ranks in the imperial administration to become one of the top and wealthiest officials in the imperial court. In 1799, the Jiaqing Emperor, successor to the Qianlong Emperor, accused Heshen of corruption and had him executed and his property confiscated. The mansion was given to Prince Qing, the 17th and youngest son of the Qianlong Emperor.

In 1850, the Xianfeng Emperor gave the mansion to his sixth brother, Prince Gong, whom the mansion is named after. The prince moved into the mansion in 1852 following repairs.

In 1921, after the collapse of the Qing dynasty, Prince Gong's grandson, Puwei, offered the property as a mortgage to the Order of Saint Benedict of the Catholic Church. The Benedictines invested significant resources into restoring the dilapidated mansion for use as a university. It was then known as Furen Catholic University until the priests were deported from China in 1951.

During the Cultural Revolution, the mansion was used by the Beijing Air Conditioning Factory until it experienced a revival in the 1980s. In 1982, it was declared a Major Historical and Cultural Site Protected at the National Level in Beijing. Since November 1996, the buildings and the gardens have become a tourist attraction. Renovation works on the mansion were completed on 24 August 2008 during the 2008 Summer Olympics in Beijing.

== Structure of the compound ==
Prince Gong's Mansion is one of the best-preserved imperial mansions in Beijing and used to house several families, and has a total area of 60,000 square meters (650,000 sq ft).

The mansion buildings are located in the south; the gardens are in the north. The buildings include several siheyuan courtyards, two-story buildings, and a grand Peking opera house. Some of the courtyards house permanent exhibitions on the history of the mansion as well as temporary art exhibitions.

In addition to the mansion, there is a 28,000-meter (92,000 ft) garden with 20 scenic spots, pavilions, artificial hills including rock originating from the Lake Tai in Jiangsu, and ponds.

There is an eight-meter-long stele which bears the Chinese character 福 (fú: lit "fortune") based on the calligraphy of the Kangxi Emperor.

== Restoration works and future ==
Since 2005, the mansion has undergone renovation worth 200 million yuan. In November 2006, restoration works started on the buildings. The mansion reopened as "Prince Kung's Mansion" on 24 August 2008. It showcases the lives of Manchu nobles and aspects of the Qing dynasty.

The Beijing opera house inside the mansion not only stages Beijing operas, but also other prominent forms of Chinese opera. In August 2008, the kunqu performance group from the "Jiangsu Kunqu House" performed their program Floating Dreams at Prince Gong's Mansion for a week.

It is included on the World Monuments Fund's 2018 list of monuments at risk.

== Gallery ==
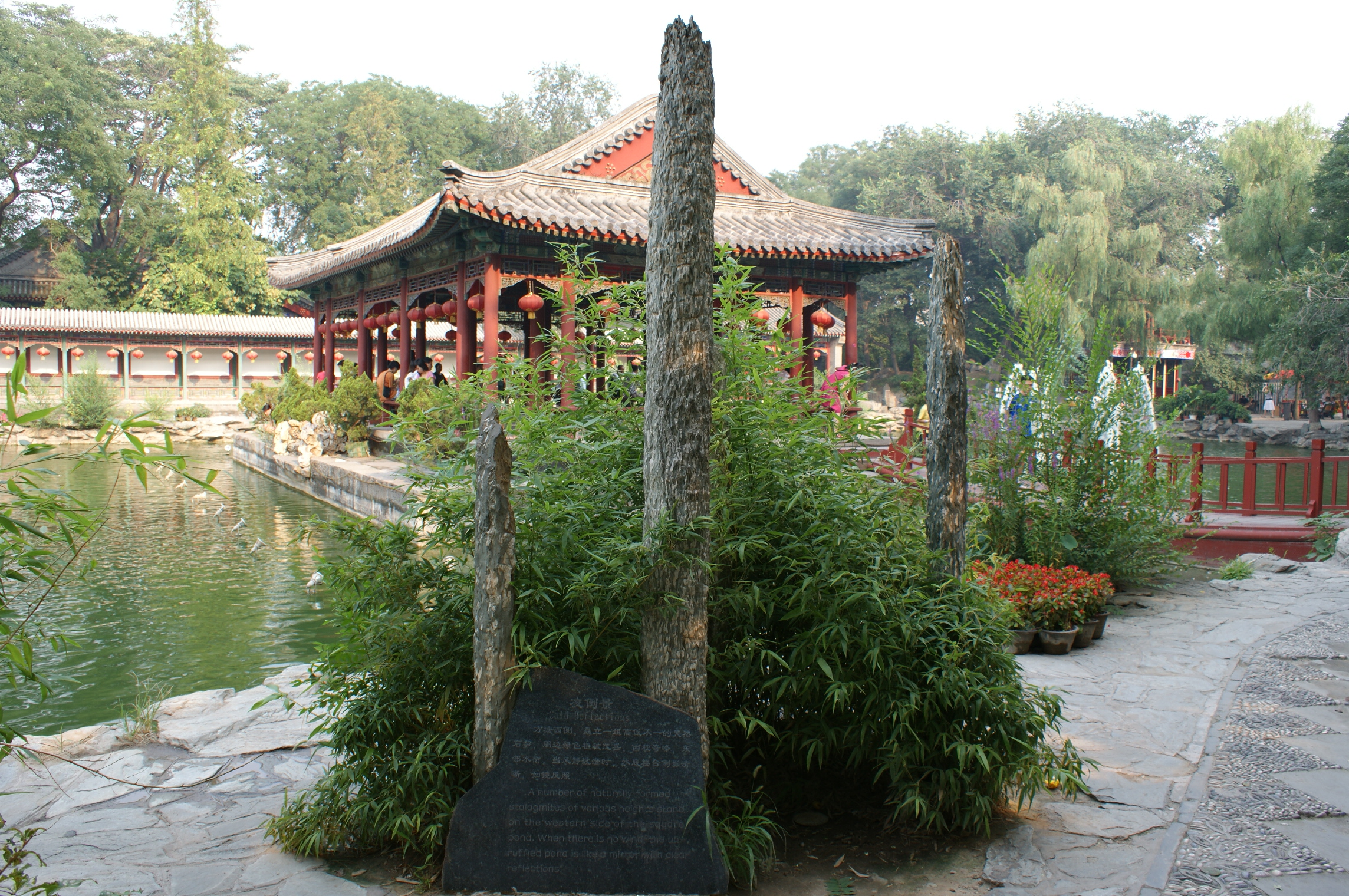
Prince Kung's Mansion

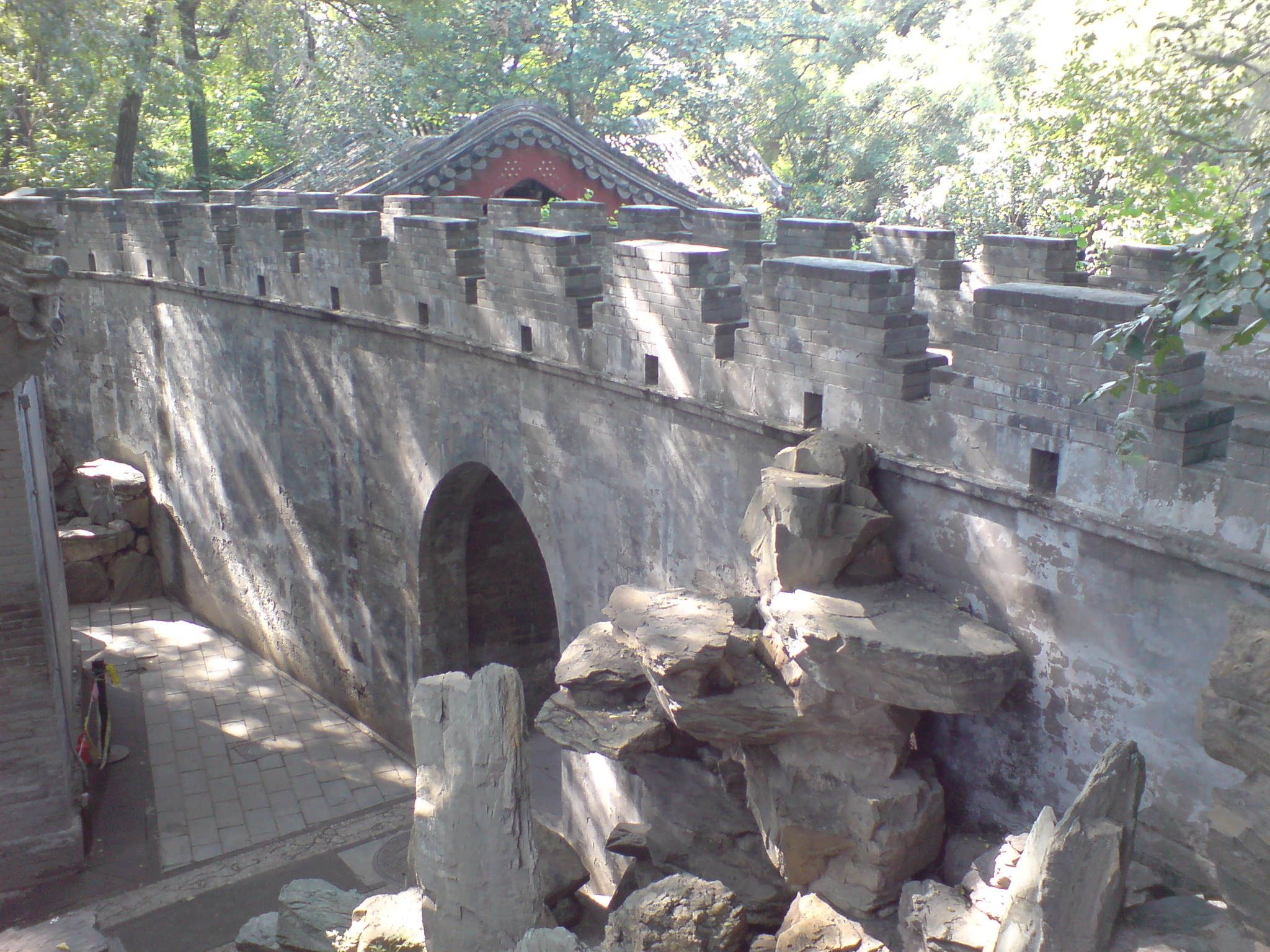
The walls surrounding the mansion

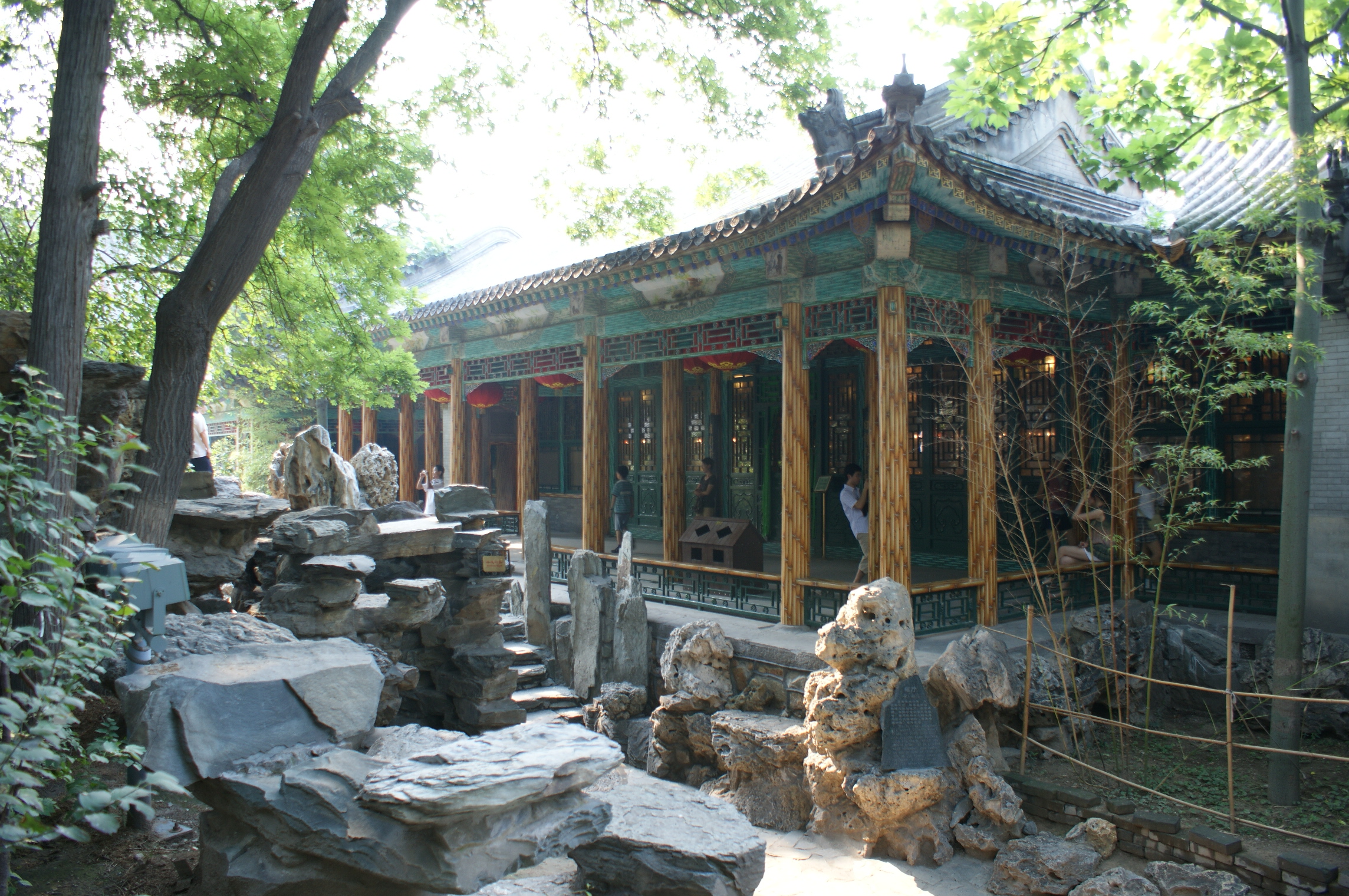
One of the many halls in the mansion

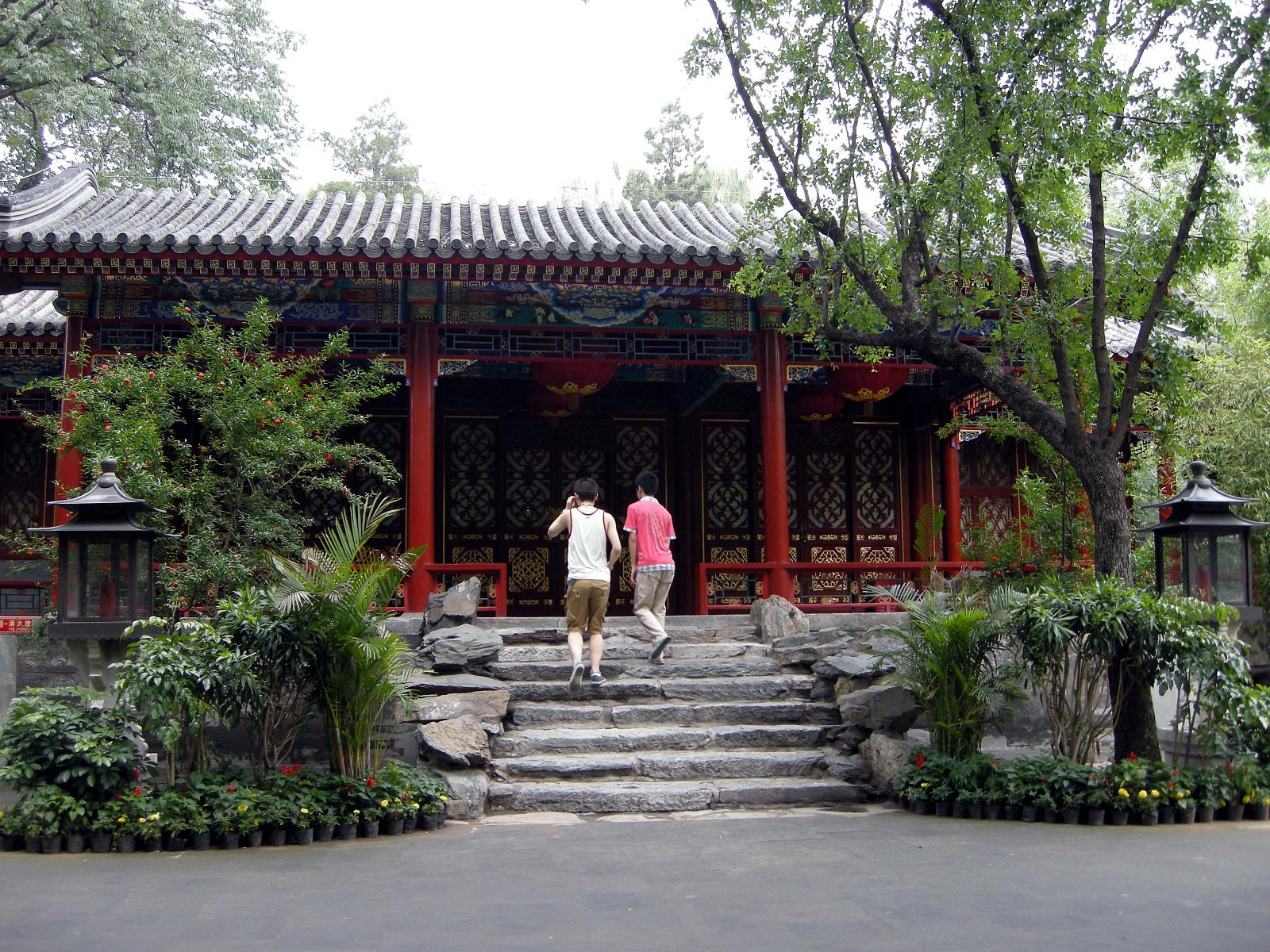
One of the gates
