= List of chief grand councillors =

Chief Grand Councillor
- 領班軍機大臣

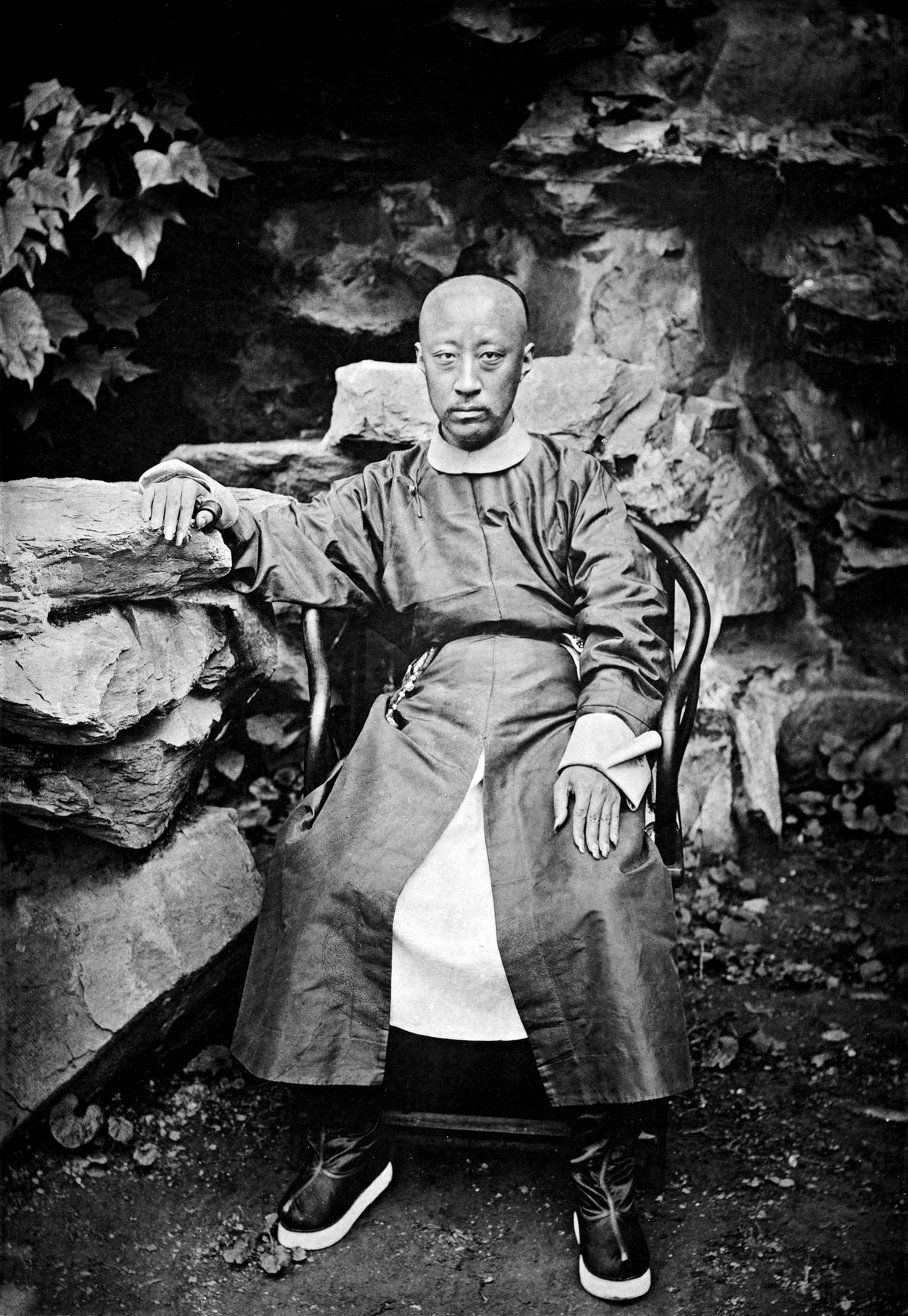
- Longest serving Yixin, Prince Gong
- Member of: Grand Council
- Appointer: Emperor
- Term length: At His Majesty's Pleasure
- Precursor: None; Senior Grand Secretaries (Ming dynasty)
- Formation: 5 July 1729
- First holder: Yinxiang, Prince Yi
- Final holder: Yikuang, Prince Qing
- Abolished: 8 May 1911

This is a list of Chief Grand Councillors (Chinese: 領班軍機大臣) of the Qing dynasty in China. The Chief Grand Councillor is usually the Grand Councillor with the highest seniority or order of precedence.

== List ==
| Portrait | Name (born–died) | Term of office | | | Emperor (Reign) | Notes |
| Portrait | Name (born–died) | Took office | Left office | Time in office | Emperor (Reign) | Notes |
|---|---|---|---|---|---|---|
| | Yinxiang, Prince Yi (1686–1730) | 5 July 1729 | 18 June 1730 | 348 days | Yongzheng (1722–1735) | |
| | Marsai (?–1733) | 18 June 1730 | September; 1731 | c. 1 year, 3 months | Yongzheng (1722–1735) | |
| | Zhang Tingyu (1675–1755) | September; 1731 | c. March; 1732 | c. 6 months | Yongzheng (1722–1735) | |
| | Ortai (1677–1745) | c. March; 1732 | c. May; 1733 | c. 1 year, 2 months | Yongzheng (1722–1735) | |
| | Fupeng, Prince Ping (1708–1749) | c. May; 1733 | 18 August 1733 | c. 3 months | Yongzheng (1722–1735) | |
| | Ortai (1677–1745) | 18 August 1733 | 12 December 1735 | 2 years, 116 days | Yongzheng (1722–1735) | |
| — Post abolished — | | | | | Qianlong (1735–1796) | (Note: An imperial council (composed of: Yunlu, Prince Zhuang, Yunli, Prince Guo, Ortai, Zhang Tingyu) was appointed to advise the emperor on state affairs.) |
| | Ortai (1677–1745) | 17 January 1738 | 14 May 1745 | 7 years, 117 days | Qianlong (1735–1796) | Died in office |
| | Necin (1708–1749) | c. June; 1745 | 19 November 1748 | c. 3 years, 5 months | Qianlong (1735–1796) | |
| | Fuheng (1722–1770) | 26 November 1748 | 2 September 1770 | 21 years, 280 days | Qianlong (1735–1796) | Died in office |
| | Yengišan (1694–1771) | 2 September 1770 | June; 1771 | c. 9 months | Qianlong (1735–1796) | Died in office |
| | Liu Tongxun (1698–1773) | June; 1771 | 29 December 1773 | c. 2 years, 6 months | Qianlong (1735–1796) | Died in office |
| | Yu Minzhong (1714–1780) | 29 December 1773 | 13 January 1780 | 6 years, 15 days | Qianlong (1735–1796) | Died in office |
| | Agui (1717–1797) | 13 January 1780 | 10 October 1797 | 17 years, 270 days | Qianlong (1735–1796) | |
| | Agui (1717–1797) | 13 January 1780 | 10 October 1797 | 17 years, 270 days | Jiaqing (1796–1820) | |
| | Heshen (1750–1799) | 10 October 1797 | 12 February 1799 | 1 year, 125 days | Jiaqing (1796–1820) | |
| | Yongxing, Prince Cheng (1752–1823) | 12 February 1799 | 19 November 1799 | 280 days | Jiaqing (1796–1820) | |
| | Qinggui (1737–1816) | 19 November 1799 | 29 October 1812 | 12 years, 345 days | Jiaqing (1796–1820) | |
| | Dong Gao (1740–1818) | 29 October 1812 | 13 March 1818 | 5 years, 135 days | Jiaqing (1796–1820) | |
| | Tojin (1755–1835) | 13 March 1818 | 13 October 1820 | 2 years, 214 days | Jiaqing (1796–1820) | |
| | Cao Zhenyong (1755–1835) | 13 October 1820 | 7 March 1823 | 2 years, 145 days | Daoguang (1820–1850) | |
| | Changling (1758–1838) | 7 March 1823 | 8 February 1825 | 1 year, 338 days | Daoguang (1820–1850) | |
| | Cao Zhenyong (1755–1835) | 8 February 1825 | 31 January 1835 | 9 years, 357 days | Daoguang (1820–1850) | Died in office |
| | Wenfu (?–1841) | 31 January 1835 | 9 September 1835 | 221 days | Daoguang (1820–1850) | |
| | Pan Shi'en (1769–1854) | 9 September 1835 | 30 August 1836 | 356 days | Daoguang (1820–1850) | |
| | Mujangga (1782–1856) | 30 August 1836 | 1 December 1850 | 14 years, 93 days | Daoguang (1820–1850) | |
| | Qi Junzao (1793–1866) | 1 December 1850 | c. February; 1851 | c. 2 months | Xianfeng (1850–1861) | |
| | Saišangga (1798–1875) | c. February; 1851 | 14 October 1852 | c. 1 year, 8 months | Xianfeng (1850–1861) | |
| | Qi Junzao (1793–1866) | 14 October 1852 | 7 November 1853 | 1 year, 24 days | Xianfeng (1850–1861) | |
| | Yixin, Prince Gong (1833–1898) | 7 November 1853 | 2 September 1855 | 1 year, 299 days | Xianfeng (1850–1861) | |
| | Wenqing (?–1856) | 2 September 1855 | c. November; 1856 | c. 1 year, 2 months | Xianfeng (1850–1861) | |
| | Peng Yunzhang (1792–1862) | c. November; 1856 | 27 July 1860 | c. 3 years, 8 months | Xianfeng (1850–1861) | |
| | Muyin (1814–1872) | 27 July 1860 | 2 November 1861 | 1 year, 98 days | Xianfeng (1850–1861) | |
| | Yixin, Prince Gong (1833–1898) | 3 November 1861 | 8 April 1884 | 22 years, 157 days | Tongzhi (1861–1875) | (Note: The Eight Regents as regent (1861)) |
| | Yixin, Prince Gong (1833–1898) | 3 November 1861 | 8 April 1884 | 22 years, 157 days | Guangxu (1875–1908) | |
| | Shiduo, Prince Li (1843–1914) | 8 April 1884 | 4 December 1894 | 10 years, 240 days | Guangxu (1875–1908) | |
| | Yixin, Prince Gong (1833–1898) | 4 December 1894 | 29 May 1898 | 3 years, 176 days | Guangxu (1875–1908) | Died in office |
| | Shiduo, Prince Li (1843–1914) | 29 May 1898 | 16 August 1901 | 3 years, 79 days | Guangxu (1875–1908) | |
| | Ronglu (1836–1903) | 16 August 1901 | 11 April 1903 | 1 year, 238 days | Guangxu (1875–1908) | Died in office |
| | Yikuang, Prince Qing (1838–1917) | 11 April 1903 | 8 May 1911 | 8 years, 27 days | Guangxu (1875–1908) | |
| | Yikuang, Prince Qing (1838–1917) | 11 April 1903 | 8 May 1911 | 8 years, 27 days | Xuantong (1908–1912) | Named Prime Minister (Note: Zaifeng, Prince Chun as regent (1908–1911)) |

== See also ==
- Grand chancellor (China)
