= Qi Junzao =

Qing dynasty official and calligrapher

Qi Junzao 祁寯藻

Chief Grand Councillor
- In office 1852–1853
- Preceded by: Saišangga
- Succeeded by: Yixin
- In office 1850–1851
- Preceded by: Mujangga
- Succeeded by: Saišangga

Grand Councillor
- In office 1841–1854

Grand Secretary of the Tiren Library
- In office 1850–1854

Assistant Grand Secretary
- In office 1849–1850

Minister of Revenue
- In office May 2, 1841 – July 11, 1850 Serving with Jingzheng (until 1845), Saišangga (since 1845)
- Preceded by: Zhuo Bingtian
- Succeeded by: Sun Ruizhen

Minister of War
- In office March 9, 1840 – May 2, 1841 Serving with Yucheng
- Preceded by: Zhuo Bingtian
- Succeeded by: Xu Naipu

Personal details
- Born: July 11, 1793 Shouyang County, Shanxi, Qing Empire
- Died: October 22, 1866 (aged 73) Beijing
- Parent: Qi Yunshi (father)
- Occupation: politician, calligrapher

Qi Junzao (Chinese: 祁寯藻; July 11, 1793 – October 22, 1866) was a Chinese politician and calligrapher. Considered one of the "four great calligraphers" of the 1800s in China, he was also a prominent poet. He later became leader of the Grand Council of the Qing dynasty's imperial court.

Qi Juanzao was Han Chinese and had special influence in the Daoguang and Xianfeng eras. He was an exponent of the Song school of Chinese poetry.

== Literature ==
- Hummel, Arthur W. Sr., ed. (1943). "Ch'i Chün-tsao" . Eminent Chinese of the Ch'ing Period. Vol. I. United States Government Printing Office. pp. 125–126.
