= Wang Jie (Qing dynasty) =

Chinese politician and calligrapher

Wang Jie 王杰
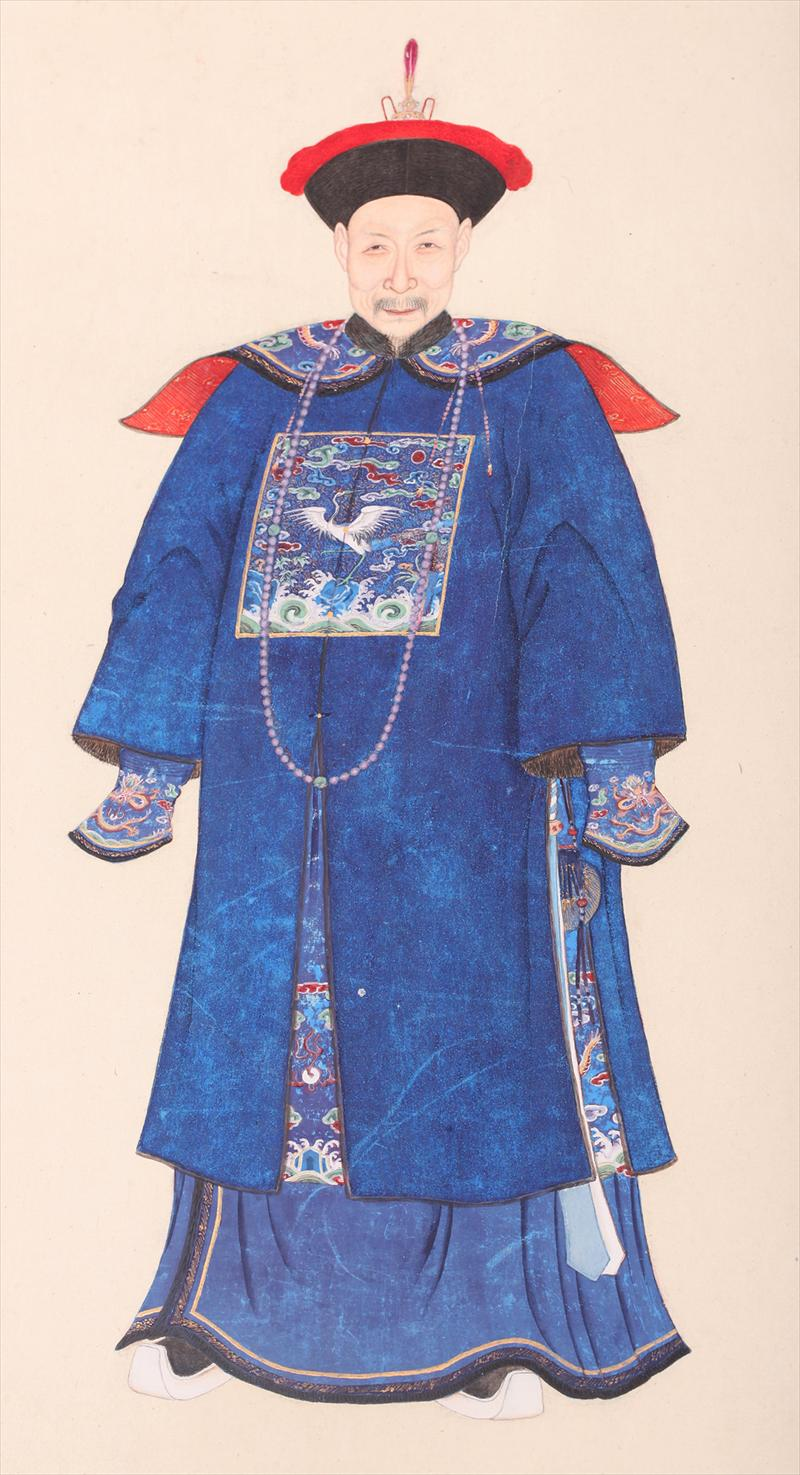

Grand Councillor
- In office 1786–1797

Grand Secretary of the Eastern Library
- In office 1787–1802

Minister of War
- In office 22 March 1784 – 7 March 1787 Serving with Fulunggan (until 1784), Fuk'anggan (1784), Qinggui (since 1784)
- Preceded by: Zhou Huang
- Succeeded by: Peng Yuanrui

Personal details
- Born: 1725 Hancheng county, Shaanxi
- Died: 1805 (aged 79–80) Beijing
- Education: Jinshi degree in the Imperial Examination
- Occupation: politician, philosopher
- Courtesy name: Weiren (偉人)
- Art name: Xingyuan (惺園)
- Posthumous name: Wenduan (文端)

Wang Jie (Chinese: 王杰, 1725–1805), courtesy name Weiren (偉人), was a Chinese politician, scholar and calligrapher of the Qing dynasty. Born in Hancheng county in Shaanxi province, he was celebrated as "the most famous minister from Shaanxi".

Wang obtained the position of zhuangyuan (the jinshi who ranked first) in the imperial examination and was selected a xiuzhuan (修撰) of the Hanlin Academy in 1761. He had served as Secretary of Cabinet (內閣學士), Vice Minister of Justice (刑部侍郎), Junior Censor-in-Chief (右都御史), Minister of War (兵部尚書), and Grand Councillor. Since 1786 he was made the chief tutor of the Palace School (上書房總師傅) for imperial princes, including the later Jiaqing Emperor. He was appointed the Grand Secretary of the Eastern Library in charge of the Ministry of Rites. He had made an exceptional contribution in Pacification of Taiwan and Gorkha, thus his portrait was painted twice in the Hall of Military Merits, known as Ziguangge (紫光閣).

Wang was described as an upright man. Seo Yu-mun (서유문; 徐有聞), a Korean diplomat who had joined the Dongzhi Festival mission (동지사; 冬至使) to Qing China as a Seojanggwan (서장관, 書狀官, the third of the mission) in 1798, reported that "Heshen has been in power for decades. From the local government to the imperial court, almost every minister fawned over him. Wang Jie, Liu Yong, Dong Gao, Zhu Gui (朱珪), Ji Yun, Tiebao (鐵保), Yubao (玉保) and others are exceptions."

== Publications ==
- Pao-ch'un ko chi (葆淳閣集; 1815)
