= Mujangga =

Manchu statesman

Chief Grand Councillor
- In office 30 August 1836 – 1 December 1850
- Preceded by: Pan Shi'en
- Succeeded by: Qi Junzao

Grand Councillor
- In office 6 June 1827 – 1 December 1850

Grand Secretary of the Wenhua Hall
- In office 17 July 1838 – 1 December 1850

Grand Secretary of the Wuying Hall
- In office 6 September 1836 – 17 July 1838

Assistant Grand Secretary
- In office 25 December 1834 – 30 August 1836

Minister of Personnel
- In office 25 December 1834 – 30 August 1836
- Preceded by: Wenfu
- Succeeded by: Keying

Minister of Revenue
- In office 14 July 1833 – 25 December 1834
- Preceded by: Xi'en
- Succeeded by: Keying

Minister of Works
- In office 9 January 1832 – 14 July 1833
- Preceded by: Fujun
- Succeeded by: Boqitu
- In office 8 January 1827 – 21 September 1831
- Preceded by: Xi'en
- Succeeded by: Fujun

Minister of War
- In office 21 September 1830 – 9 January 1831
- Preceded by: Songyun
- Succeeded by: Naqing'an

Minister of Lifan Yuan
- In office 3 March 1824 – 8 January 1827
- Preceded by: Fujun
- Succeeded by: Yinghe

Viceroy of the Canal Transport
- In office 15 August 1826 – 13 October 1826
- Preceded by: Chen Zhongfu
- Succeeded by: Nergingge
- In office 20 July 1825 – 19 September 1825
- Preceded by: Wei Yuanyu
- Succeeded by: Chen Zhongfu

Viceroy of Zhili
- In office 14 April 1837 – 25 July 1837
- Preceded by: Keshen
- Succeeded by: Keshen

Personal details
- Born: 1782
- Died: 1856 (aged 73–74)

Mujangga (Manchu: ᠮᡠᠵᠠᠩᡤᠠ, romanized: mujangga; Chinese: 穆彰阿; pinyin: Mùzhāng'ā; Wade–Giles: Mu-chang-a; Jyutping: Muk6jeong1aa3; 1782–1856) was a Manchu statesman of the late Qing dynasty, belonging to the Gogiya (郭佳) clan. He belonged under the Bordered Blue Banner in the Eight Banners.

== Career ==
In 1805, he was awarded the jinshi degree, the highest level in the imperial examination and quickly rose in the ranks of the Qing government. He became a member of the Grand Council in 1828 and gradually grew to exercise a decisive influence on the Daoguang Emperor's policies. Following the demise of Cao Zhenyong, Mujangga became the chief Grand Councillor in 1837. As tensions in Sino-British relations rose in 1839, he became one of the chief advocates of a conciliatory policy towards the British and following the outbreak of the First Opium War, he moved to dismiss three Imperial Commissioners from their positions. Lin Zexu in September 1840, Qishan in February 1841, and Yishan in May 1841. Around 1845 he was President of the Hanlin Academy. Mujangga's conciliatory policies created tensions with the allegedly more xenophobic heir apparent, and following his accession to the throne as the Xianfeng Emperor, Mujangga was dismissed from all his positions in 1851.

== Teachings ==
Mujangga was the teacher of Zeng Guofan — a young Chinese statesman, Confucian scholar, and future general of the Xiang Army during the Taiping Rebellion who later became a mentor to Li Hongzhang, a future diplomat of the Qing Dynasty and trade minister of the Beiyang Navy.
