= Liu Quan =

Liu Quan may refer to:

- Liu Quan (prince) (劉全; died 79), Eastern Han Dynasty prince, son of Emperor Zhang of Han
- Liu Quan (Qing Dynasty) (劉全; died 1799), housekeeper of corrupt official Heshen
