= Shiduo =

- Prince Li of the First Rank 和碩禮親王
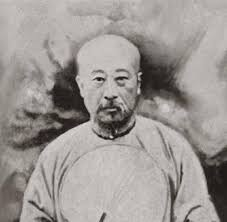

Prince Li of the First Rank
- Tenure: 1850 – 8 January 1914
- Predecessor: Quanling
- Successor: Dunhou

Chief Grand Councillor
- In office: 8 April 1884 – 16 November 1894
- Predecessor: Yixin, Prince Gong
- Successor: Yixin, Prince Gong
- In office: 30 May 1898 – 16 August 1901
- Predecessor: Yixin, Prince Gong
- Successor: Ronglu

Grand Councillor
- In office: 8 April 1884 – 16 August 1901
- Born: 27 July 1843
- Died: 8 January 1914 (aged 70)
- Spouse: Lady Borjigit
- Issue: Dunhou; Dunkun
Names
- Shiduo (世鐸)
Posthumous name
- Prince Like of the First Rank (禮恪親王)
- House: Aisin Gioro
- Father: Quanling
- Mother: Lady Janggiya

Shiduo (Chinese: 世鐸; pinyin: Shìduó, Manchu: ᡧᡳᡩ᠋ᠣ, romanized: šido, 27 July 1843 – 8 January 1914) was a Manchu prince of the imperial Aisin Gioro clan during the Qing dynasty. He was the third son of Quanling, the 11th holder of the Prince Li (禮) title. After his father's death he inherited the peerage until his death.

Shiduo served as a Grand Councilor from 1884 to 1901.

== Family ==
- primary consort, of the Borjigit clan
  - Prince Lidun of the First Rank, Chenghou (禮敦親王 誠厚)
  - Prince Li of the First Rank, Chengkun (禮親王 誠堃)
