= Xu Song =

Xu Song is the name of:

- Xu Song (Qing dynasty) (1781–1848), Qing dynasty scholar-official and poet
- Xu Song (singer) (born 1986), Chinese pop singer
