= Song Huiyao Jigao =

Qing dynasty collection of Song dynasty writings

- Editor: Xu Song et al.
- Author: Zhang Dexiang; Wang Gui; Cai You; Yu Yunwen; Liang Kejia; Wang Huai; Jing Tang; Shi Miyuan; and others
- Language: Classical Chinese
- Publication place: Qing dynasty (documents from Song dynasty)

Song Huiyao Jigao
- Traditional Chinese: 宋會要輯稿
- Simplified Chinese: 宋会要辑稿
Transcriptions
Standard Mandarin
- Hanyu Pinyin: Sòng Huìyào Jígǎo
- Wade–Giles: Sung hui-yao chi-kao

Song Huiyao Jigao ('Song Government Manuscript Compendium') is a Qing dynasty collection of Song dynasty writings on Song government, edited by Xu Song and others who extracted the manuscripts in part from the Ming dynasty Yongle Encyclopedia (1408).

== Background and content ==
During the reign of the Qing Jiaqing Emperor (r. 1796–1820), whilst compiling the Quan Tang Wen (全唐文), literally: Complete Literature of the Tang) academic Xu Song ordered the preparation of the Song Huiyao Jigao based on the Song Hui Yao (宋会要/宋會要, literally: Song Compendium) of the Yongle Encyclopedia and other sources. The entire work runs to 366 chapters and includes sections covering Imperial genealogy (帝系), wives and concubines (后妃), music (乐) Confucian Rites (礼), military attire (舆服), ceremonial procedure (仪制), divination (瑞异), divination (运历), Confucian honors〈崇儒), official appointments (职官), elections (选举), consumer goods (食货) crime and punishment (刑法) military matters (兵), territorial issues (方域), foreigners and barbarians (蕃夷) and Daoism and Buddhism (道释) as well as 17 other topics.

The book contains a large quantity of Imperial edicts and decrees as well as memorials and other documents relating to institutional mechanisms of the Song dynasty. Whilst not replacing the History of Song, the Song Huiyao Jigao is still a key document for research into the Song legal system.

Many of the elements comprising the Song Huiyao Jigao were lost until the 1930s when Miao Quansun (缪荃孙/繆荃孫) Tu Ji (屠寄) and Liu Fuceng (刘富曾/劉富曾) compiled a new version that was first published in 1936.
