= Songyun (Qing governor) =

Grand Councilor
- In office 1821–1822
- In office 1812–1813
- In office 1793–1794

Grand Secretary of the Wuying Hall
- In office 1814–1817

Grand Secretary of the Eastern Library
- In office 1813–1814

Assistant Grand Secretary
- In office 1811–1813

Minister of War
- In office 12 July 1829 – 21 September 1830 Serving with Wang Zongcheng
- Preceded by: Yulin
- Succeeded by: Mujangga
- In office 19 June – 30 July 1821 Serving with Ru Fen
- Preceded by: Bolin
- Succeeded by: Jinchang
- In office 3 August – 1 November 1819 Serving with Dai Liankui
- Preceded by: Chonglu
- Succeeded by: Heshitai

Minister of Rites
- In office 19 June 1826 – 12 July 1829 Serving with Wang Tingzhen (until 1827), Yao Wentian (1827), Tang Jinzhao (since 1827)
- Preceded by: Mukdengge
- Succeeded by: Fuqitu
- In office 23 January – 3 August 1819 Serving with Wang Tingzhen
- Preceded by: Mukdengge
- Succeeded by: Chonglu

Minister of Personnel
- In office 19 June – 30 July 1821 Serving with Liu Huanzhi
- Preceded by: Nayancheng
- Succeeded by: Wenfu
- In office 5 November 1811 – 14 October 1813 Serving with Zou Bingtai (until 1813), Cao Zhenyong (1813)
- Preceded by: Hūturi
- Succeeded by: Tiyeboo

Minister of Revenue
- In office 13 February – 6 March 1799 Serving with Shen Chu
- Preceded by: Fuchang'an
- Succeeded by: Buyandalai

Minister of Works
- In office 14 August 1794 – 13 February 1799 Serving with Peng Yuanrui
- Preceded by: Helin
- Succeeded by: Nayancheng

Personal details
- Born: 1752
- Died: 1835 (aged 82–83)

Chinese name
- Chinese: 松筠
Transcriptions
Standard Mandarin
- Hanyu Pinyin: Sōngyún
- Wade–Giles: Sung-yün

Manchu name
- Manchu script: ᠰᡠᠩᠶᡡᠨ

Songyun (1752–1835) was a military governor (amban) of the Qing provinces of Xinjiang, Guangdong, and Tibet from 1802 to 1809.

== Works ==
In Xinjiang, he was responsible for the compilation of a gazetteer of the area using the services of officials exiled to the frontier area, including Wang Tingkai, Qi Yunshi, and Xu Song.

Political offices
Preceded by Yimian	Viceroy of Shaan-Gan; 1799–1800	Succeeded by Changlin
Preceded by Hening	Imperial commissioner-resident of Tibet; 1794–1799	Succeeded by Yingshan
Preceded by Bailing	General of Ili; 1803–1809	Succeeded by Changling
Preceded by Changling	Viceroy of Shaan-Gan; 1809–1810	Succeeded by Nayancheng
Preceded by Alinboo	Viceroy of Liangjiang; 11 January 1810–26 February 1811	Succeeded by Leboo
Preceded by Bailing	Viceroy of Liangguang; 26 February–5 November 1811	Succeeded by Jiang Youtian
Preceded by Jinchang	General of Ili; 1814–1818	Succeeded by Changling
