= Xuyuanmeng =

Qing dynasty official

Imperial tutor Xuyuanmeng

Assistant Grand Secretary
- In office 24 November 1723 – 5 September 1726

Minister of Revenue
- In office 24 November 1723 – 5 September 1726 Serving with Zhang Tingyu
- Preceded by: Sun Chaqi
- Succeeded by: Fan Shiyi

Minister of Works
- In office 3 June 1718 – 24 November 1723 Serving with Chen Yuanlong (until 1722), Li Xianfu (since 1722)
- Preceded by: Sun Chaqi
- Succeeded by: Sun Chaqi

Governor of Zhejiang
- In office January 1715 – 9 March 1717
- Preceded by: Wang Duzhao
- Succeeded by: Zhu Shi

Personal details
- Born: Xuyuanmeng; 21 November 1655 Beijing
- Died: December 1741 (aged 86) Beijing
- Relations: Šuhede (grandson), Šucang (greatgrandson)
- Education: Jinshi degree in the Imperial Examination
- Occupation: politician
- Clan name: Šumuru
- Courtesy name: Shanchang (善長)
- Art name: Dieyuan (蝶園)
- Posthumous name: Wending (文定)

Military service
- Allegiance: Qing dynasty
- Branch/service: Manchu Plain White Banner

Xuyuanmeng

Chinese name
- Traditional Chinese: 徐元夢
- Simplified Chinese: 徐元梦
Transcriptions
Standard Mandarin
- Hanyu Pinyin: Xúyuánmèng
- Wade–Giles: Hsü^{2}-yüan^{2}-mêng^{4}

Manchu name
- Manchu script: ᠰᡳᠣᡳ ᠶᡠᠸᠠᠨ ᠮᡝᠩ
- Romanization: sioi yuwan meng

Xuyuanmeng (21 November 1655 – December 1741), courtesy name Shanchang (善長), art name Dieyuan (蝶園) was a Qing dynasty official from the Manchu Šumuru clan and the Plain White Banner of the Eight Banners.

Xuyuanmeng obtained the highest degree (jinshi) in the imperial examination and was selected a shujishi of the Hanlin Academy in 1673. He was fluent in Chinese, Manchu and Mongolian, the Kangxi Emperor praised that "No one in the contemporary era can surpass Xuyuanmeng's translation level." (徐元夢繙譯，現今無能過之)

He was very interested in Chinese culture and was proficient in Confucianism; Three Manchu emperors, Kangxi, Yongzheng and Qianlong, respected him very much and regarded him as the tutor. His archery ability was very poor, and the Qing emperor always attached great importance to the military training of the bannermen. Once, Kangxi Emperor taught the princes how to shoot arrows in Yingtai Island, Zhongnanhai. Xuyuanmeng, as the tutor of the Crown Prince Yinreng, went accompanied with them. Xuyuanmeng couldn't shoot arrows and was scolded by Kangxi. Xuyuanmeng defended himself a few words. Kangxi was furious and beat him up. The emperor ordered to search his home and confiscate his property, then exile his parents to Heilongjiang. In the next day, the emperor calmed down his anger the next day, regretted the irrational decision made yesterday, and ordered the revocation of yesterday's order.

During Qianlong's reign, he and Ortai were ordered to modernize the Manwen Laodang from old Manchu script (tongki fuka akū hergen) version to the new Manchu script (tongki fuka sindaha hergen) version, and kept in the imperial library.

Xuyuanmeng died 1741. Qianlong Emperor sent Prince Hongzhou to express condolences. He was given the posthumous name Wending (文定) and awarded posthumous appointment of Grand Tutor (太傅).

One of his grandson was Šuhede (舒赫德).
