= Songyun =

Songyun is the atonal pinyin romanization of various Chinese names.

It may refer to:

- Songyun (monk), 6th-century Chinese Buddhist monk, pilgrim, and travel writer
- Songyun (Qing governor), 19th-century Manchu governor
