= Marsai =

First Class Duke Marsai

Chief Grand Councillor
- In office 18 June 1730 – 15 August 1731
- Preceded by: Yinxiang, Prince Yi
- Succeeded by: Zhang Tingyu

Grand Councillor
- In office 18 June 1730 – 15 August 1731 Serving with Yinxiang (until 1730), Zhang Tingyu, Jiang Tingxi

Grand Secretary of the Wuying Hall
- In office 10 September 1728 – 1732
- Preceded by: Funingga
- Succeeded by: vacant (next: Maizhu)

Personal details
- Born: Marsai
- Died: 1733 Jak and Baidarik
- Parent: Nomin (諾敏) (father)
- Occupation: politician
- Clan name: Magiya (馬佳)

Military service
- Allegiance: Qing dynasty
- Branch/service: Manchu Plain Yellow Banner
- Battles/wars: Dzungar–Qing Wars

Marsai (Manchu: ᠮᠠᡵᠰᠠᡳ, Chinese: 馬爾賽, died 1733), born in Magiya clan, was a Qing dynasty official from the Manchu Plain Yellow Banner.

Marsai was a grandson of Tuhai (圖海). Tuhai had made military exploits in quelling the Revolt of the Three Feudatories and granted the hereditary rank Third class Duke (三等公), the dukedom was later passed to Nomin (諾敏), then to Nomin's eldest son Marsai.

During Kangxi Emperor's reign, Masai had served as Commander of the Guards Division (護軍統領), lieutenant-general of the Mongolian Bordered Yellow Banner (鑲黃旗蒙古都統), commander of the imperial bodyguard (領侍衛內大臣) and other positions. In 1724, Tuhai was promoted the First class Duke (一等公) posthumously by Yongzheng Emperor. As the eldest grandson of Tuhai, Marsai inherited this title. In the same year Marsai was appointed Manchu Bordered Blue Banner (鑲藍旗滿洲都統). Since 1728 he served as the Grand Secretary of the Wuying Hall (武英殿大學士) and awarded the honorary minister of Personnel. In 1730, Marsai, Zhang Tingyu and Jiang Tingxi were appointed Grand Councillors to participate in discussions on the war against the Dzungar Khanate.

After the defeat of the Qing army in Battle of Khoton Lake in the next year, Marsai replaced Furdan (傅爾丹) as the Border-Pacification General-in-Chief (撫遠大將軍) to lead a military campaign in northwestern China against the Dzungar Khanate. When he led his army to Tula (圖拉), he got news of Galdan Tseren's attack on Khovd. Fearing the enemy, he did not dare to march, so he was rebuked by the emperor and demoted to Border-Pacification General (撫遠將軍). The emperor ordered him to accept the command of Xibao, the Prince Shuncheng. Marsai was made commander of the garrisons at Jak (扎克) and Baidarik (拜達里克) to guard the route from Guihuacheng (歸化城) to Chakan Sor (察罕叟爾).

In 1733 Marsai, for his failure in the previous year to attack the fleeing enemies who were defeated and pursued by Prince Tsereng (策棱), was executed after a court martial.
