= Yu Minzhong =

First Class Adaha hafan Yu Minzhong 于敏中
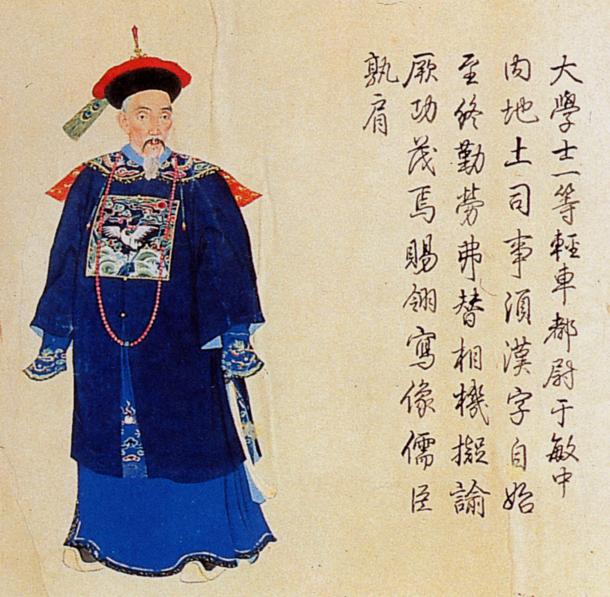

Chief Grand Councillor
- In office 17 September 1773 – 14 January 1780
- Preceded by: Liu Tongxun
- Succeeded by: Agui

Grand Councillor
- In office 27 August 1760 – 14 January 1780 (as the Chief Grand Councillor since 1773)

Grand Secretary of the Wenhua Hall
- In office 17 September 1773 – 14 January 1780

Assistant Grand Secretary
- In office 18 February 1771 – 17 September 1773

Minister of Revenue
- In office 27 January 1766 – 17 September 1773 Serving with Arigūn (until 1769), Guwamboo (1769–1770), Surne (since 1770–1771), Šuhede (1771–1773), Agui (since 1773)
- Preceded by: Liu Lun
- Succeeded by: Wang Jihua

Personal details
- Born: 1714 Jintan, Jiangsu, China
- Died: 14 January 1780 (aged 65–66) Beijing, China
- Occupation: politician

Yu Minzhong (Chinese: 于敏中; pinyin: Yú Mǐnzhōng, 1714 – 14 January 1780) was an official of the Qing Dynasty, who served as chief grand councilor for part of the reign of the Qianlong Emperor. Yu Minzhong was a native of Jintan, Jiangsu province. In 1737, he became a Zhuangyuan of the Imperial examination. Before his appointment as chief grand councilor, he served as an editor and scribe to the emperor. During his tenure as chief grand councilor, a significant rise in corruption occurred.
