= Zhou Huang =

Qing Chinese politician, writer and calligrapher

Zhou Huang 周煌

Left Censor-in-Chief
- In office 22 March 1784 – 15 February 1785 Serving with Fuhing (until July 1784), Ayangga (since July 1784)
- Preceded by: Zhu Chun
- Succeeded by: Ji Yun

Minister of War
- In office 30 September 1780 – 22 March 1784 Serving with Fulong'an
- Preceded by: Cai Xin
- Succeeded by: Wang Jie

Minister of Works
- In office 25 January 1780 – 30 September 1780 Serving with Cokto
- Preceded by: Ji Huang
- Succeeded by: Zhou Yuanli

Personal details
- Born: 1714 Fuzhou, Sichuan Province (present-day Fuling District, Chongqing)
- Died: 1785 (aged 70–71) Fuzhou, Sichuan Province
- Children: Zhou Yuandai (son)
- Education: jinshi degree

Chinese name
- Chinese: 周煌
Transcriptions
Standard Mandarin
- Hanyu Pinyin: Zhōu Huáng

Courtesy name
- Traditional Chinese: 景垣 or 緒楚
- Simplified Chinese: 景垣 or 绪楚
Transcriptions
Standard Mandarin
- Hanyu Pinyin: Jǐngyuán or Xùchǔ

Art name
- Chinese: 海山
Transcriptions
Standard Mandarin
- Hanyu Pinyin: Hǎishān

Posthumous name
- Chinese: 文恭
Transcriptions
Standard Mandarin
- Hanyu Pinyin: Wéngōng

Zhou Huang (Chinese: 周煌; pinyin: Zhōu Huáng, 1714–1785), also spelled Chou Huang or Chow Hwang, was a politician, writer and calligrapher of the Qing dynasty.

Zhou was a native of Fuzhou, Sichuan Province (present-day Fuling District, Chongqing). In 1737, he became a jinshi of the Imperial examination. He had served as editor of the Hanlin Academy (翰林院編修), Secretary of Cabinet (內閣學士), Minister of Works, Ministry of War, and Left Censor-in-Chief (左都御史). He also took part in compiling the famous Siku Quanshu. Zhou died in 1785 in his hometown and was posthumously granted the honorary appointment of Crown Prince's Grand Tutor (太子太傅). He was also awarded the posthumous name "Wengong" (文恭).

Zhou was good at poetry and calligraphy, he was also a tutor of Prince Yongyan (later the Jiaqing Emperor). In 1756 he was sent to Ryukyu Kingdom together with Quankui (全魁) for the investiture of Shō Boku. His boat caught in a storm and was wrecked on a reef near the Kume Island. Zhou prayed to Mazu for protection, his boat was finally arriving Naha Harbor safely. On his way home, Zhou and Quankui built a Mazu temple in Kume Island. Zhou also compiled Liuqiuguo Zhilüe (琉球國志略), a sixteen volume topography of the Ryukyu Islands for the Qianlong Emperor.
