= Liu Yong (Qing dynasty) =

Chinese politician and calligrapher

Liu Yong 劉墉
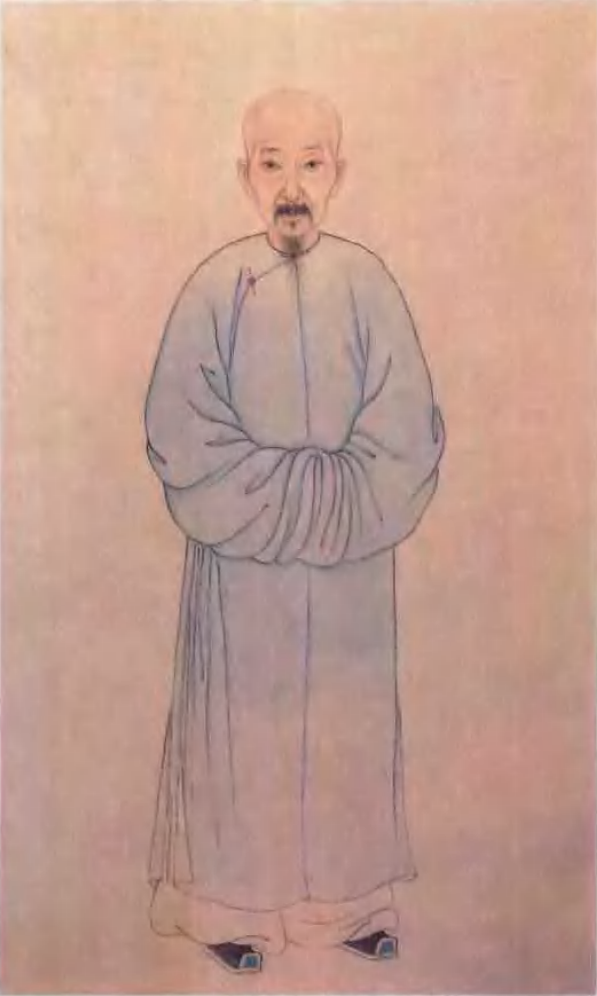

Grand Secretary of the Tiren Hall
- In office 1797–1805

Assistant Grand Secretary
- In office 1783–1789

Minister of Personnel
- In office 1792–1797 Serving with Jin Jian (until 1795), Baoning (since 1795)
- Preceded by: Sun Shiyi
- Succeeded by: Shen Chu
- In office 1783–1789 Serving with Umitai (until 1784), Heshen (1784–1786), Fuk'anggan (since 1786)
- Preceded by: Cai Xin
- Succeeded by: Peng Yuanrui

Minister of Rites
- In office 1791–1792 Serving with Changqing
- Preceded by: Ji Yun
- Succeeded by: Ji Yun

Minister of Works
- In office 1782–1783 Serving with Cokto
- Preceded by: Luo Yuanhan
- Succeeded by: Jin Jian

Viceroy of Zhili (acting)
- In office 1783–1783
- Preceded by: Yuan Shoutong
- Succeeded by: Liu E

Personal details
- Born: 1719 Zhucheng, Shandong, Qing China
- Died: 1805 (aged 85–86) Beijing, Beizhili, Qing China
- Parent: Liu Tongxun (father)
- Occupation: Politician, calligrapher
- Courtesy name: Chongru (崇如)
- Art name: Shi'an (石庵)
- Posthumous name: Wenqing (文清)

Liu Yong (simplified Chinese: 刘墉; traditional Chinese: 劉墉; pinyin: Liú Yōng; 1719–1805) was a Chinese politician and calligrapher of the Qing dynasty.

== Biography ==
Liu Yong was born in Shandong 1719 with courtesy name Chongru (崇如), pen name Shi'an (石庵). He served in a number of high-level positions with a reputation for being incorruptible, including as the Minister of Rites and Minister of War. Since 1782 he was made the chief tutor of the Palace School (上書房總師傅) for imperial princes, including the later Jiaqing Emperor.

Liu was described as an upright man. Seo Yu-mun (서유문, 徐有聞), a Korean diplomat who had joined the Dongzhi Festival mission (동지사, 冬至使) to Qing China as a Seojanggwan (서장관, 書狀官, the third of the mission) in 1798, reported that "Heshen has been in power for decades. From the local government to the imperial court, almost every minister fawned over him. Wang Jie, Liu Yong, Dong Gao, Zhu Gui (朱珪), Ji Yun, Tiebao (鐵保), Yubao (玉保) and others are exceptions."

Liu Yong is also regarded by some as the "most influential calligrapher of his time".

== In fiction and popular culture ==
- Portrayed by Li Baotian in The Legend of Liu Yong (1996)
- Portrayed by Li Xinmin in Qianlong Dynasty (2003)
- Portrayed by Lee Shing-cheong in Succession War (2018)
- Portrayed by Kuo Tzu-chien in Lord Jiaqing and The Journey to Taiwan (2022)
