= Hu Zhongzao =

Qing dynasty politician (1711–1755)

Hu Zhongzao (胡中藻) (29 October 1711 – 21 May 1755), sobriquet Jianmosheng (坚磨生), was a Qing dynasty scholar who was a disciple of the Manchu politician Ortai. During the reign of the Qianlong Emperor, Ortai and all his political allies were implicated, and Hu Zhongzao and his entire family were sentenced to death for treason and literary crimes.

== Background ==
Hu Zhongzao was the son of Hu Dazhi (胡大祉) and was from Xinjian County, Nanchang Prefecture, Jiangxi Province (江西南昌府新建县).

In October of the fourth year of Qianlong, Hu Zhongzao was 29 years old, so he was born in the 51st year of Kangxi (1712) at the latest.

=== Career ===
In February of the 20th year of Qianlong, the Qianlong Emperor secretly told Wei Zhezhi (卫哲治), the governor of Guangxi, to inspect all the exam questions, poems, and evil deeds committed by Hu when he was studying politics in Guangxi, and strictly check Hu's performance. On March 13, the same year, Qianlong denounced Hu Zhongzao for "complaining" about "things humankind should not have".

Scholar Han Zhanke (翰詹科) said that Hu violated the law and should be sentenced to lingchi.

Hu escaped the more severe sentence of lingchi, but was beheaded in 1755. At this time, Hu Zhongzao's father, son, wife, concubine, and daughter-in-law died one after another. Their property was confiscated, but they had little money at home: only 3,000 taels of silver and 70 stones. The case was tied back to Ortai as Hu Zhongzao was Ortai's disciple, and Ortai's memorial tablet was ordered to be withdrawn from Xianliang Temple on charges of forming "private cliques" (私立朋党). Ortai's nephew, Ocang (鄂昌), was forced to commit suicide. Generally, historians believe that the Hu Zhongzao case was a means to crack down on private cliques.

Hu Zhongzao's poem "A handful of hearts are turbid and clear" (“一把心肠论浊清”) was used as evidence of his rebellion as he put the character zhuo (浊), meaning 'murky', before Qing (清), the same character referring to the Qing dynasty.
