= Akdun =

Minister of Justice
- In office 1746–1748 Serving with Wang Youdun
- Preceded by: Šenggan
- Succeeded by: Daldangga
- In office 1748–1755 Serving with Wang Youdun
- Preceded by: Šenggan
- Succeeded by: Omida

Personal details
- Born: Akdun; May 4, 1685 Beijing, Qing dynasty
- Died: February 22, 1756 (aged 70) Beijing, Qing dynasty
- Children: Agui (son)
- Parent: Asha (father)
- Occupation: politician
- Clan name: Janggiya

Military service
- Allegiance: Qing dynasty
- Branch/service: Manchu Plain Blue Banner

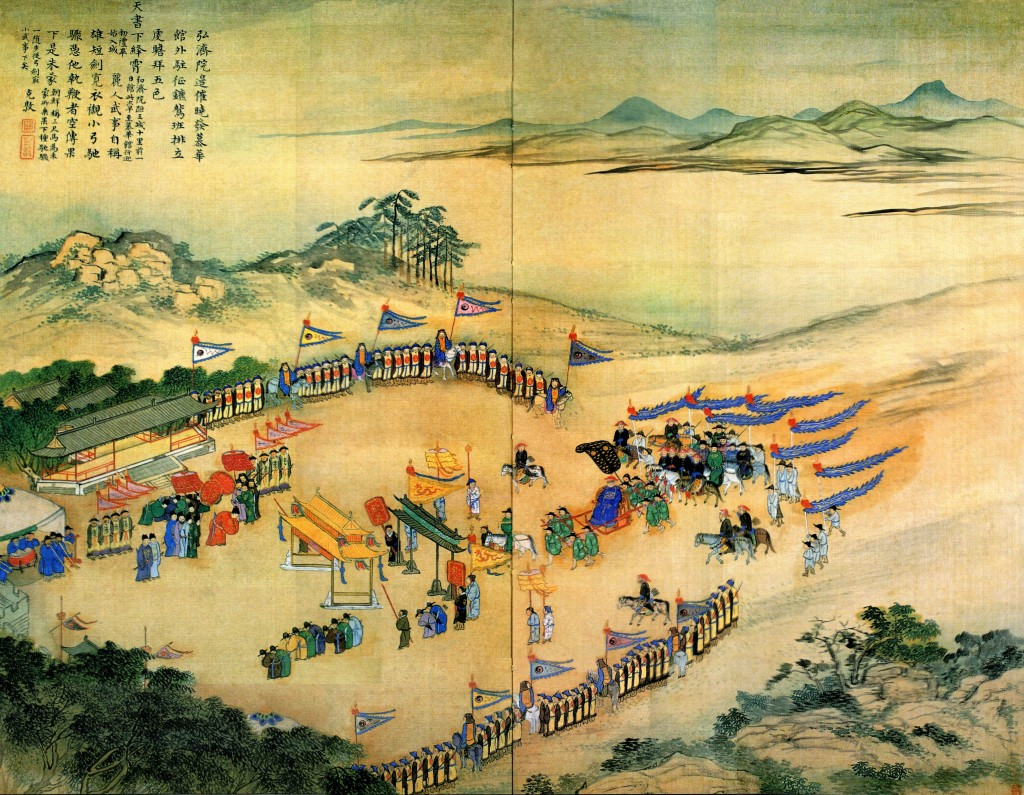
Manchu ambassador Akdun was greeted by the Korean king near the Yeongeunmun Gate (迎恩門 lit. gate of receiving imperial favor), which was located outside the walls of Hanseong. After staying a hotel named Hongjewon (弘濟院), the envoys of the Manchu Qing Empire reached Mohwagwan (慕華館 lit. building of longing for China), where they received a reception from the king, and then entered the capital.

Akdun (Chinese: 阿克敦; pinyin: Ākèdūn; Wade–Giles: A-k'o-tun; Manchu: ᠠᡴᡩᡠᠨ Akdun; Styled: Lixuan, 立軒; May 4, 1685 – February 22, 1756) was an official of the Qing dynasty. He was a member of the Janggiya (章佳) clan and of the Manchu Plain Blue Banner. He was the father of the Qing dynasty official and general Agui.

== Biography ==
After receiving the Jǔrén degree in 1708 and his Jìnshì degree in 1709, Akdun became successively a bachelor from 1709 to 1712, a compiler from 1712 to 1715, an expositor from 1715 to 1716, and a reader from 1716 to 1717 in the Hanlin Academy. In 1717 he was sent as head of a mission to Korea, with re-appointments in 1722 and 1724. His impressive appearance and his dignified bearing lead to him being well received on all of these occasions. From 1718 to 1726 he served other posts, as sub-chancellor of the Grand Secretariat from 1718 to 1722, as junior vice-president of the Board of War from 1722 to 1723, chancellor of the Hanlin Academy from 1722 to 1725, as senior vice-president of the Board of Ceremonies in 1726 and on the Board of War in 1726. When Kong Yuxun (孔毓珣) was summoned for an audience with the emperor in 1726, Akdun was sent to take his place as acting governor-general of Guangdong and Guangxi, and in addition was made Tartar General of Canton. In the following year he was transferred to the post of acting governor of Guangdong, and later in the same year to that of Guangxi. Unfortunately he did not get on well with his colleagues, and in 1728 as the result of charges brought against him by Kong Yuxun and Yang Wenqian (楊文乾), he was deprived of his office and titles.

Three years later in 1731, he was reinstated as an extra sub-chancellor of the Grand Secretariat, serving in the army of the Northwest in a campaign against the Oirats. This campaign was a failure and proved embarrassing to the government, in 1734 Akdun was made assistant to Funai (傅鼐) in the peace negotiations held at the tribal headquarters at Ili.

Failing to accomplish its aims, the Commission returned to Beijing in the spring of 1735. Late in 1738 Akdun was put in charge of another Commission and succeeded in concluding a boundary agreement. After his return to Beijing, early in 1739, he filled many posts, among them the following: junior and senior vice-president both of the Board of Works from 1738 to 1740 and of the Board of Punishments in 1740; senior vice-president of the Board of Civil Office in 1740–46, serving concurrently as lieutenant-general of the Chinese Plain White Banner in 1742 and of the Manchu Bordered Blue Banner in 1743; chancellor of the Hanlin Academy in 1745–48; and president of the Censorate in 1746. He was also president of the Board of Punishments in 1746–48, and Associate Grand Secretary 1748. In 1748 an error was made in the Manchu translation of an edict framed by the Hanlin Academy conferring a posthumous title upon Consort Donggo. Since Akdun was the chancellor of the Hanlin Academy, he was deprived of his post, but remained to serve as sub-chancellor of the Grand Secretariat.

Soon after, he was re-appointed president of the Board of Punishments, serving concurrently as lieutenant-general of the Chinese Bordered White Banner, and later as chancellor of the Hanlin Academy. Early in 1749 he was reinstated as Associate Grand Secretary. Thereafter he served the imperial government without interruption until his retirement in 1755 owing to declining eyesight. During his last years of service, when the emperor was journeying to Jehol, Henan, and Fengtian, he was entrusted three times (1749, 1750, and 1754) with the conduct of affairs at the capital. He died early in 1756 and was canonized as Wenqin (Chinese: 文勤; pinyin: wénqín).
