= Dong Gao =

qiduwei Dong Gao
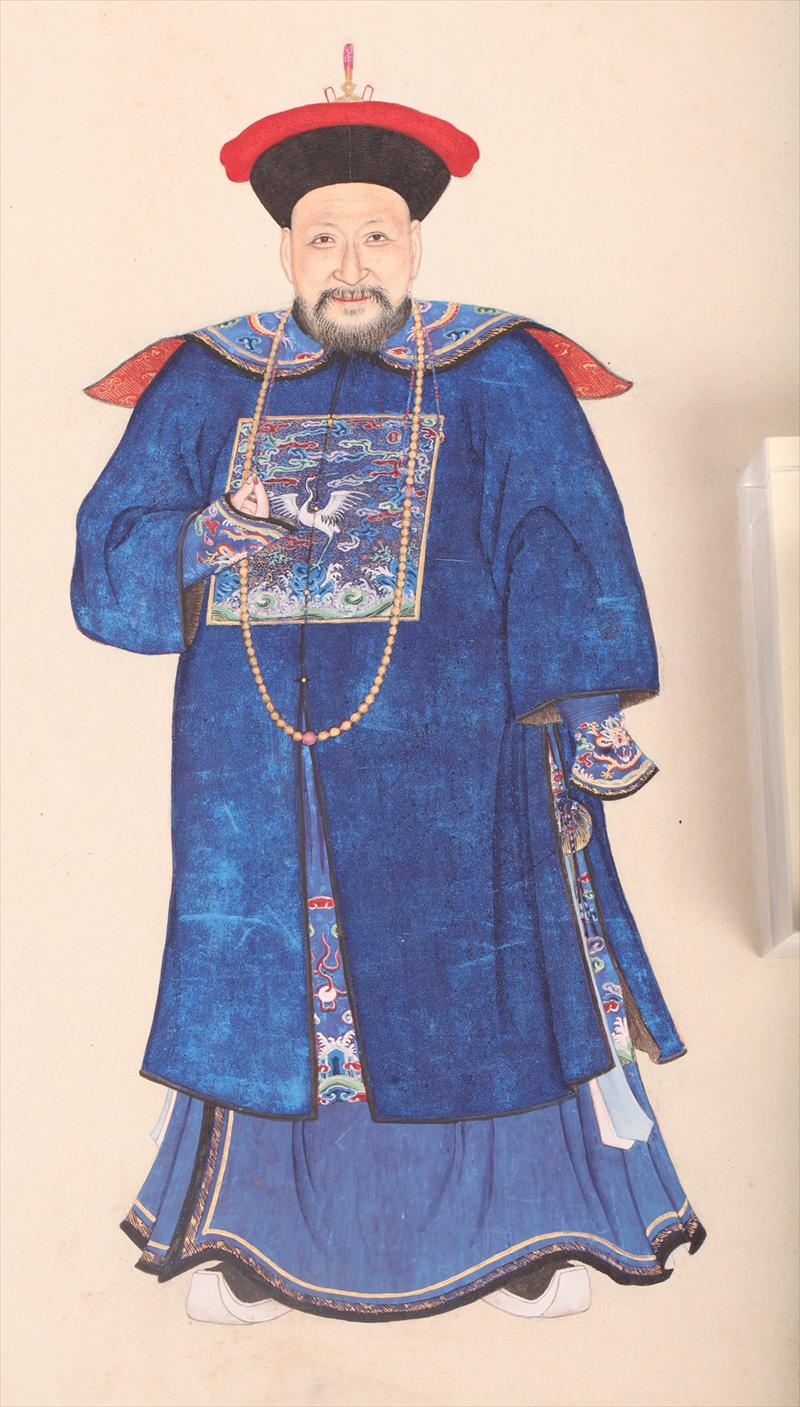

Chief Grand Councillor
- In office 29 October 1812 – 13 March 1818

Grand Councillor
- In office 10 January 1780 – 8 November 1818

Grand Secretary of the Wenhua Hall
- In office 29 June 1799 – 8 November 1818

Grand Secretary of the Eastern Library
- In office 6 November 1796 – 2 February 1799

Minister of Revenue
- In office 10 March 1787 – 6 November 1796

Personal details
- Born: 1740 Fuyang, Hangzhou, Zhejiang
- Died: 8 November 1818 (aged 77–78)
- Parent: Dong Bangda (father)
- Education: Jinshi degree in the Imperial Examination
- Occupation: politician, scholar, painter, calligrapher
- Courtesy name: Zhelin (蔗林)
- Posthumous name: Wengong (文恭)

Dong Gao (董誥, 1740 – 8 November 1818), courtesy name Zhelin (蔗林), was a Chinese politician, scholar, painter and calligrapher of the Qing dynasty.

Dong was the eldest son of Dong Bangda (董邦達). He obtained the highest degree (jinshi) in the imperial examination and was selected a bianxiu (編修) of the Hanlin Academy in 1762. He had served as Secretary of Cabinet (內閣學士), Junior Deputy Minister of Works (工部右侍郎), Junior Deputy Minister of Revenue (戶部右侍郎), Senior Deputy Minister of Revenue (戶部左侍郎), acting Deputy Minister of Justice (署理刑部侍郎), Grand Councillor, Minister of Revenue and other positions. In 1776 he was made the vice editor for the Siku Quanshu, the largest collection of books in Chinese history. In 1777, he participated in the compilation of Researches on Manchu Origins. Since 1780 he was allowed to ride horse in the Forbidden City (賜紫禁城騎馬). He had made an exceptional contribution in Pacification of Taiwan and Gorkha, thus his portrait was painted twice in the Hall of Military Merits, known as Ziguangge (紫光閣).

In 1802 he was awarded the hereditary rank "qiduwei" (騎都尉). Since 1809 he was made the chief tutor of the Palace School (上書房總師傅) for imperial princes, including the later Daoguang Emperor. He retired in 1818 and died in the same year.

Dong was described as an upright man. Sŏ Yu-mun (서유문, 徐有聞), a Korean diplomat who had joined the Dongzhi Festival mission (동지사, 冬至使) to Qing China as a Seojanggwan (서장관, 書狀官, the third of the mission) in 1798, reported that "Heshen has been in power for decades. From the local government to the imperial court, almost every minister fawned over him. Wang Jie, Liu Yong, Dong Gao, Zhu Gui (朱珪), Ji Yun, Tiebao (鐵保), Yubao (玉保) and others are exceptions."

Dong was also a painter, his paintings were highly prized by both Qianlong and Jiaqing Emperors, who frequently wrote colophons for them. His calligraphy was also highly praised. It is reported that when Qianlong Emperor became too old to write with facility not a little of the penmanship attributed to the Emperor was actually the work of Dong Gao.

== Publications ==
- Manzhou yuanliu kao (滿洲源流考, "Researches on Manchu Origins")
- Shouyi guangxun (授衣廣訓)
- Quantangwen (全唐文)
- Xixun shengdian (西巡盛典)
- Qinding junqi zeli (欽定軍器則例)
- Huangqing xuwen ying (皇清續文穎)
