= Zhang Tingyu =

Chinese politician and historian (1672–1755)

Third Class Count Qinxuan Zhang Tingyu
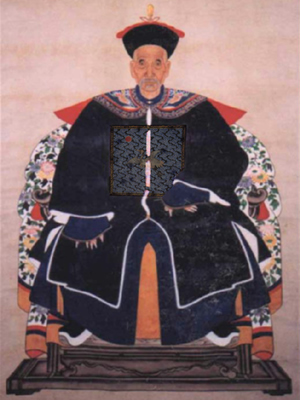

Chief Grand Councillor
- In office 15 August 1731 – May 1732
- Preceded by: Marsai
- Succeeded by: Ortai

Grand Councillor
- In office 5 July 1729 – 31 December 1749

Grand Secretary of the Baohe Hall
- In office 10 September 1728 – 31 December 1749

Grand Secretary of the Wenhua Hall
- In office 1 December 1727 – 10 September 1728

Grand Secretary of the Wenyuan Library
- In office 27 October 1726 – 1 December 1727

Assistant Grand Secretary
- In office 28 July 1725 – 27 October 1726

Minister of Revenue
- In office 4 October 1723 – 27 October 1726 Serving with Xuyuanmeng
- Preceded by: Tian Congdian
- Succeeded by: Jiang Tingxi

Minister of Rites
- In office 17 January 1723 – 4 October 1723 Serving with Suku
- Preceded by: Chen Yuanlong
- Succeeded by: Zhang Boxing

Personal details
- Born: October 29, 1672 Beijing, China
- Died: May 19, 1755 (aged 82) Tongcheng, Anhui
- Relations: Zhang Tinglu (brother)
- Children: Zhang Ruoai, Zhang Ruocheng, Zhang Ruoting
- Parent: Zhang Ying (father)
- Occupation: politician, scholar, historian

Zhang Tingyu (Chinese: 張廷玉; pinyin: Zhāng Tíngyù; Wade–Giles: Chang T'ingyü, October 29, 1672 – May 19, 1755) was a Han Chinese politician and historian who lived in the Qing dynasty.

== Biography ==
Zhang Tingyu
- Traditional Chinese: 張廷玉
- Simplified Chinese: 张廷玉
Transcriptions
Standard Mandarin
- Hanyu Pinyin: Zhāng Tíngyù
- Wade–Giles: Chang^{1} T'ing^{2}yü^{4}

Courtesy name
- Chinese: 衡臣
Transcriptions
Standard Mandarin
- Hanyu Pinyin: Héngchén

Art name
- Traditional Chinese: 研齋
- Simplified Chinese: 研斋
Transcriptions
Standard Mandarin
- Hanyu Pinyin: Yánzhāi

Posthumous name
- Chinese: 文和
Transcriptions
Standard Mandarin
- Hanyu Pinyin: Wénhé

Zhang Tingyu was born in Tongcheng in Anhui province. In 1700, he obtained a jinshi position in the imperial examination and shortly afterwards he was appointed to the Hanlin Academy. He subsequently rose through the ranks in the Qing civil service and served under the Kangxi, Yongzheng and Qianlong emperors. Zhang Tingyu was especially trusted by the Yongzheng Emperor, who made him one of the first members of the Grand Council, an informal state organ which would, in due course, develop into the emperor's own privy council. From 1735 to 1737, Zhang Tingyu and Ortai guided the transformation of the regency council into the prototype of the later Grand Council.His colleagues included renowned figures like Maci.

Zhang was an upstanding civil service officer and highly praised for both his upright character and principled background. Having considerable skill in literature, he compiled the History of Ming in 1739. There is some confusion as to whether he or another trusted officer Longkodo was the principal announcer of the will of Kangxi. Zhang was the only official to survive the battles of succession from Kangxi to Yongzheng to Qianlong, and was trusted by all three emperors. His Manchu rival, Ortai, was an official who served Yongzheng and Qianlong. However, his relationship with the Qianlong Emperor deteriorated during his final years.

In 1749, Zhang requested for retirement, his second request in two years. In his letter, Zhang further requested the Qianlong Emperor to honor the Yongzheng Emperor's wish to allow his plaque to be placed at the Imperial Ancestral Temple. The Qianlong Emperor was displeased, but granted Zhang's request. The next day, Zhang did not visit the emperor to thank him in person, instead sending his son Ruocheng. The Qianlong Emperor was greatly angered by this, and issued an edict to rebuke Zhang. Wang Youdun, one of Zhang's students, sought clemency on Zhang's behalf, and informed Zhang of the emperor's anger. However, Zhang made the mistake of seeking an audience with the emperor even before the edict rebuking him had reached his residence. The Qianlong emperor then knew that Wang had leaked the news of his anger to Zhang. The emperor then relieved Wang of his official post (Wang had been in said position for less than a month), and Zhang of his nobility title. In the second lunar month of 1750, Zhang again requested to return to his hometown. As the emperor's eldest son Yonghuang had just died, the emperor was again incensed. He then sent Zhang a list of past officials who had their plaques enshrined in imperial ancestral temples, and ordered Zhang to reflect on whether he was worthy of the honour. Zhang then requested the emperor to revoke the honor and to punish him; the Qianlong emperor agreed to the revocation, but did not punish Zhang further. In the seventh lunar month of the same year, Zhang Ruocheng's father-in-law Zhu Quan was implicated in a case, which then implicated Zhang Tingyu. The emperor then decided to punish Zhang by revoking all rewards which had been bestowed upon Zhang by himself, his father and grandfather.

Zhang died of illness in 1755, and was granted a plaque at the Imperial Ancestral Temple according to the wishes of the Yongzheng Emperor and the Qianlong Emperor, who had decided to reverse the revocation decision. He was the only Han Chinese official during the Qing dynasty to be bestowed such a posthumous honor.

== See also ==
- Twenty-Four Histories
