= Agui =

Manchu noble general

First Class Duke Chengmou Yingyong Agūi
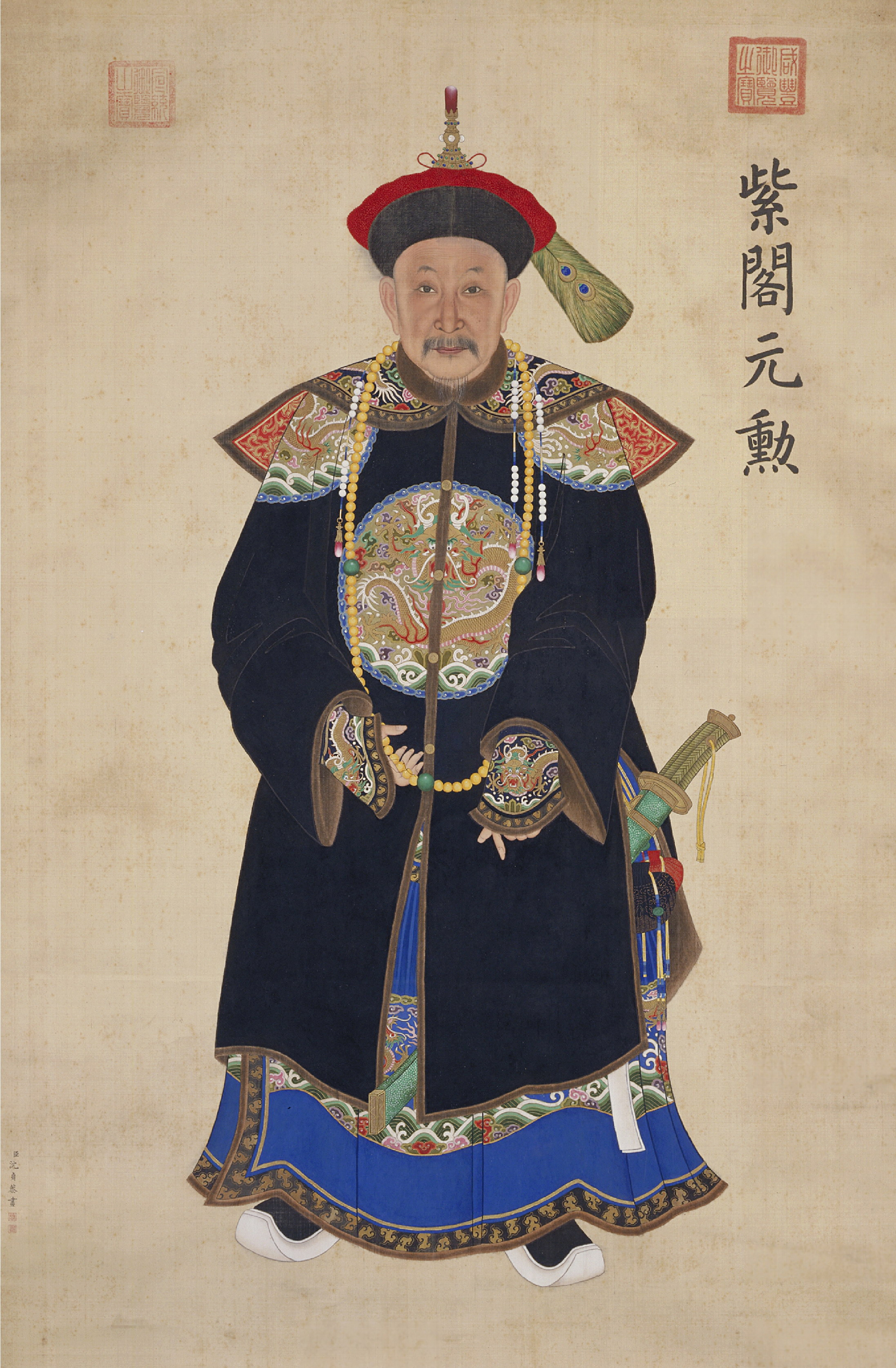

Chief Grand Councillor
- In office December 1779 – 10 October 1797
- Monarchs: Qianlong Emperor; Jiaqing Emperor
- Preceded by: Yu Minzhong
- Succeeded by: Heshen

Grand Councillor
- In office 6 March 1776 – 10 October 1797 (as the Chief Grand Councillor since 1779)
- In office February 1763 – March 1765

Grand Secretary of the Wuying Hall
- In office 27 June 1777 – 10 October 1797

Assistant Grand Secretary
- In office April 1776 – 27 June 1777

Minister of Personnel
- In office 6 March 1776 – 27 June 1777 Serving with Cheng Jingyi
- Preceded by: Guanbao
- Succeeded by: Yonggui

Minister of Revenue
- In office 24 April 1773 – 6 March 1776 Serving with Yu Minzhong (until 1773), Wang Jihua (since 1773)
- Preceded by: Šuhede
- Succeeded by: Fengšengge

Minister of Rites
- In office 19 February – 24 August 1773 Serving with Wang Jihua
- Preceded by: Yonggui
- Succeeded by: Yonggui
- In office 4 January – 23 September 1770 Serving with Wang Jihua
- Preceded by: Yonggui
- Succeeded by: Yonggui

Minister of War
- In office 5 June – 8 August 1768 Serving with Lu Zongkai
- Preceded by: Fulong'an
- Succeeded by: Toyong

General of Ili
- In office March 1767 – April 1768
- Preceded by: Mingrui
- Succeeded by: Iletu

Personal details
- Born: Agūi; September 17, 1717 Beijing, Qing dynasty
- Died: October 10, 1797 (aged 80) Beijing, Qing dynasty
- Parent: Akdun (father)
- Occupation: politician, general
- Clan name: Janggiya
- Courtesy name: Guangting (廣廷)
- Posthumous name: Wencheng (文成)

Military service
- Allegiance: Qing dynasty
- Branch/service: Manchu Plain Blue Banner; Manchu Plain White Banner

Agui (Chinese: 阿桂; pinyin: Āguì; Wade–Giles: A¹-kuei⁴; Manchu: ᠠᡤᡡᡳ, Möllendorff: agūi, Abkai: agvi; September 7, 1717 – October 10, 1797) was a Manchu noble general for the Qing dynasty. As the only son of Akdun, he was a scion of a noble family who led a number of important Manchu military operations, including several of the "Ten Great Campaigns".

== Sino-Burmese War ==
On April 14, 1768, Fuheng was appointed military commissioner (Jinglue) and Agui and Aligun, both Manchus, were appointed deputies. This occurred due to the death of the previous commander Ming Rui. Agui had already proven himself in Chinese Turkestan, as a competent commander. He served under Fuheng in the 1769 failed campaign of the Sino-Burmese War (1765–1769). Agui soon found himself out of favor as he was not fully supportive of Fuheng's plans and the Chinese Qianlong Emperor was vocal of his dislike for this behavior. The main push occurs in December at the height of the disease period and the Chinese suffer great losses to disease. Confusion surrounds the following events. Some sources say that the Myanmar nation initiated peace talks and others say the Chinese did; however it happened, by December 1769 peace negotiations had started, and on December 22 the treaty was signed. However, both Agui and Fuheng were absent. The chief negotiator for the Chinese was Ha Guoxing. Documents from this era seem to support the fact that the only reason the Chinese agreed to a treaty was through the leadership of Agui and other generals, as Fuheng was vehemently opposed to a peace treaty. When the treaty was brought from the Myanmar king to Fuheng to be signed, he refused. Agui, after allying other powerful generals on his side, confronted Fuheng again. Fuheng demanded that all those allied against him and for peace, sign a statement (ganjie) to that effect. When they all did, he grew furious and threatened impeachment. This did not occur as he was getting sicker each day. At this time a decree was received from Qianlong, demanding a complete withdrawal regardless of the circumstances. This withdrawal, may also have been attributed to Agui, as he was the one responsible for letting the emperor know of the illness affecting Fuheng. Agui took charge of the troops during the withdrawal as Fuheng was worsening.

When all was said and done, Agui took the majority of the emperor's wrath as Fuheng was on his deathbed. The emperor in acknowledging the retreat and defeat at the hands of the Myanmar, stated that it

made the Myanmar look down upon our celestial dynasty.

He also blamed Agui and others for not stopping Fuheng from the foolhardy decision to invade Myanmar if they knew that it would fail. The Jinchuan uprising could not come at a better time for Agui, who would alter drastically, the emperor's opinion of him after his coming victories. Agui thought so negatively of his time in Myanmar that he had all correspondence and writings concerning this time destroyed upon his death.

== Ten Great Campaigns ==
He put down an uprising of the Jinchuan people west of Sichuan, called the second Battle of the Jinchuan. This battle took place from 1771 until 1776. During this battle, Agui expressed the importance in shangyun which was the policy of utilizing merchants in keeping the military stocked.

In 1781, Agui went to Lanzhou, in the northwestern Gansu province, to lead the suppression of the Jahriyya revolt by the Salar adherents of the Jahriyya Sufi order. along with Heshen, Li Shiyao and Fuk'anggan.

Agui also led campaigns to unify the Yili area and Taiwan island (1786-1787) within the Chinese state.

He served as a minister to the emperor and a member of the Grand Council and Grand Secretariat (both administrative cabinets of the Chinese government) until his death.

Agui's grandson was Na-yen-ch'êng who served as an official in Xinjiang after the Afaqi Khoja revolts.
