= Šumuru =

Manchu clan and family name

Manchu name
- Manchu script: ᡧᡠᠮᡠᡵᡠ

Chinese name
- Chinese: 舒穆祿氏 石抹氏
Transcriptions
Standard Mandarin
- Hanyu Pinyin: shū mù lù shì shí mǒ shì

Pronunciation respelling name
- Pronunciation respelling: SHOO-moo-roo

Šumuru, a clan and family name, is one of the Eight Great Manchu Clans. The clan originated among the Kurka tribes of the Wild Jurchens with association with the Shimo clan recorded in Chinese during the Jurchen Jin through Ming dynasties. Besides the Manchus, branches of the Šumuru clan were also found among the Mongol and Sibe Eight Banners.

== Overview ==
During the rise of the Later Jin in the late sixteenth and early seventeenth centuries, different branches of the clan, settled in Kurka, Hunchun, Jusheri, Yehe, Jiyang, Harmin, and other regions, gradually joined to Nurhaci's rising. The most distinguished lineage descended from Langju, a Kurka tribal chieftain based in Huncun, whose son Yangguri became one of Nurhaci's foremost generals. Yangguri further distinguished himself in the conquest of Hada and in campaigns against the Ming, and was posthumously honored as Prince Wuxun (武勳王), the only other prince title granted to non-Aisin Gioro members besides Fuk'anggan during Qing dynasty. His descendants inherited noble titles for generations, while other members of the lineage, including Lenggeri, Namtai, Tantai, and Tambu, served as ministers, commanders, and banner officials.

Another prominent branch descended from Yecen of Jušeri, who supported Nurhaci and became his brother-in-law through marriage. His descendants included the Grand Secretary Fulen and several distinguished military officers. Other notable members of the clan included Xuyuanmeng, a prominent scholar-official who served under the Kangxi, Yongzheng, and Qianlong Emperors, and his grandson Šuhede, who reached the position of Grand Secretary.

Following the fall of the Qing dynasty, members of the Šumuru clan adopted various Sino surnames, most commonly Xu (徐), as well as Zheng (鄭), Fang (方), Guan (關), Shang (尚), Yang (杨), Song (宋), Sun (孫), Xiao (萧), and several others.

== Gallery ==
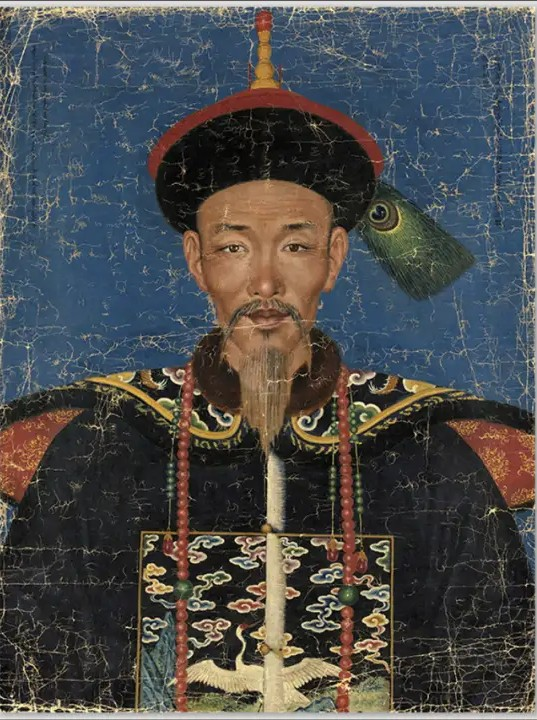
Šuhede, Grand Secretary and Councillor in Qianlong era

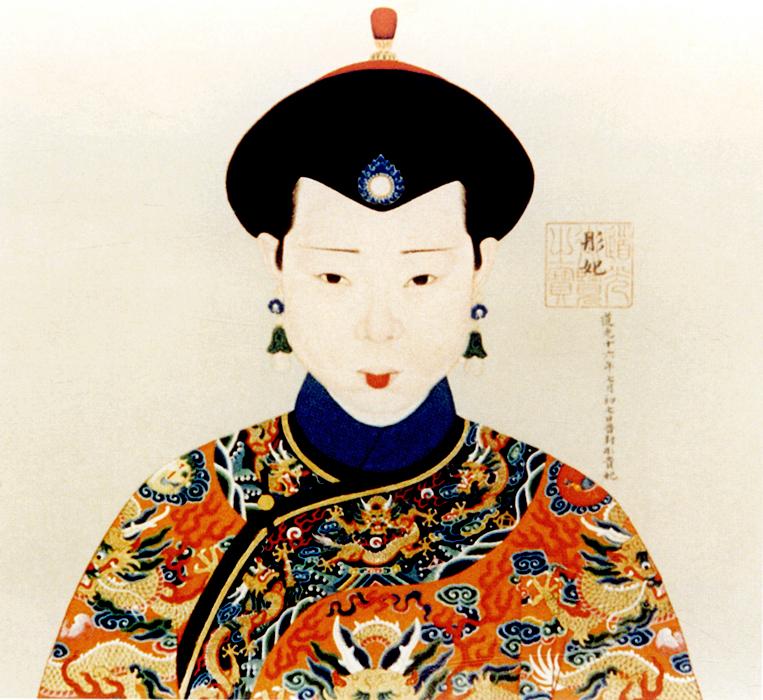
Noble Consort Tong in ceremonial dress

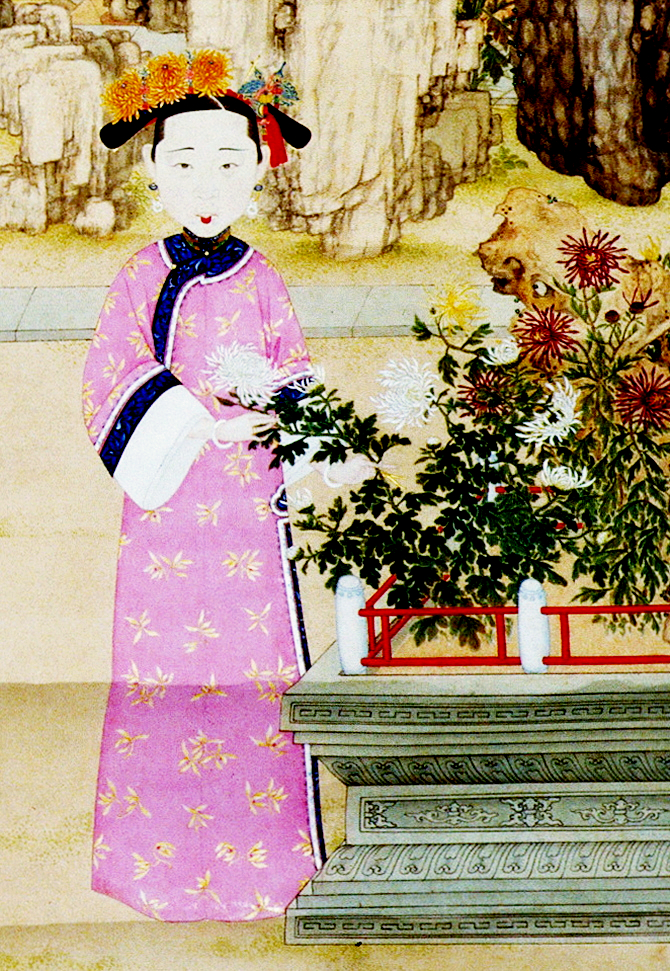
Noble Consort Tong in daily dress

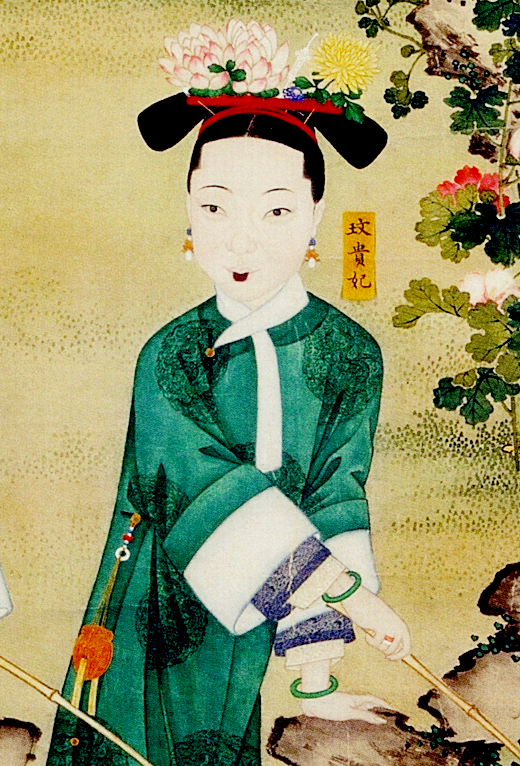
Noble Consort Wen (Xu clan) in daily dress

== See also ==
- List of Manchu clans
