= Šuhede =

Yunqiwei Šuhede
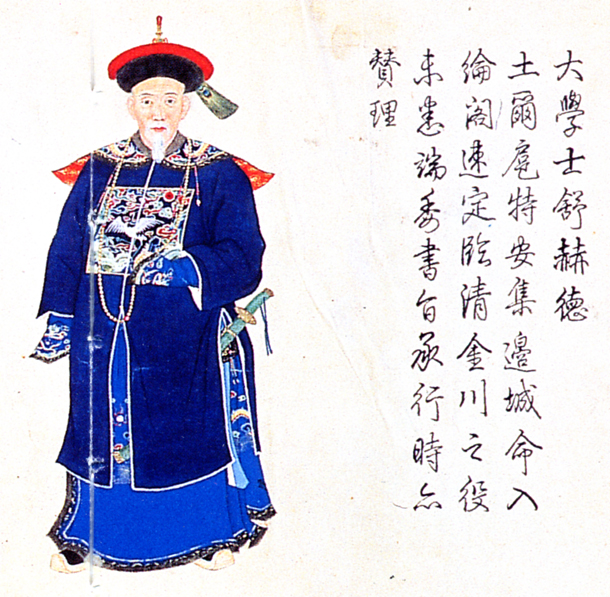

Grand Councillor
- In office 22 September 1773 – 27 May 1777
- In office 18 November 1748 – December 1754

Grand Secretary of the Wuying Hall
- In office 22 September 1773 – 27 May 1777

Minister of Revenue
- In office 16 December 1771 – 24 August 1773
- Preceded by: Surne
- Succeeded by: Agūi
- In office 18 January 1749 – 24 January 1750
- Preceded by: Yengišan
- Succeeded by: Haiwang

Minister of Justice
- In office 4 August 1761 – 14 April 1768
- Preceded by: Omida
- Succeeded by: Toyong

Minister of Works
- In office 24 December 1758 – 4 August 1761
- Preceded by: Namjal
- Succeeded by: Agūi

Minister of War
- In office 11 April 1757 – 7 May 1757
- Preceded by: Fusen
- Succeeded by: Hadaha
- In office 24 January 1750 – 15 September 1754
- Preceded by: Hadaha
- Succeeded by: Bandi
- In office 25 November 1748 – 18 January 1749
- Preceded by: Bandi
- Succeeded by: Hūboo

Personal details
- Born: 20 January 1711 Beijing, China
- Died: 27 May 1777 (aged 66) Beijing, China
- Relations: Xuyuanmeng (grandfather), Šucang (son), Šuning (son), Tecengge (son-in-law)
- Parent: Sige (father)
- Occupation: politician, general
- Clan name: Šumuru
- Courtesy name: Borong (伯容)
- Art name: Mingting (明亭)
- Posthumous name: Wenxiang (文襄)

Military service
- Allegiance: Qing dynasty
- Branch/service: Manchu Plain White Banner
- Battles/wars: First Jinchuan campaign Conquest of Dzungar; Amursana rebellion Revolt of the Altishahr Khojas; Sino-Burmese War

Šuhede (ᡧᡠᡥᡝᡩᡝ᠋, Chinese: 舒赫德, 20 January 1711 – 27 May 1777), courtesy name Borong (伯容), was a Qing dynasty official from the Manchu Šumuru clan and the Plain White Banner of the Eight Banners. He was a grandson of Xuyuanmeng.

Šuhede entered official life as a bithesi (Chinese: 筆帖式, "clerk") in 1728. He had served as Secretary of the Cabinet (內閣中書), investigating censor (監察御史), Military Secretary of Grand Council (軍機章京), Minister of War, Minister of Revenue, Minister of Justice, Grand Secretary, Grand Councillor and other positions. He had participated in putting down the rebellion of Jinchuan Hill Peoples, the revolt of Amursana, and the Revolt of the Altishahr Khojas. He had made an exceptional contribution in Pacification of "Western Regions" (aka Xinjiang) and Jinchuan, thus his portrait was painted twice in the Hall of Military Merits, known as Ziguangge (紫光閣).

== Publications ==
- Qin ding jiao bu Linqing ni fei ji lue (欽定勦捕臨淸逆匪紀略)
- Qin ding Sheng chao xun jie zhu chen lu (欽定勝朝殉節諸臣錄)
