= Wang Tingkai =

Wang Tingkai (also referred to as Tingkai Wang; Chinese: 汪廷楷) was a Chinese official exiled to the Central Asian frontier during the period in office of the Military Governor Songyun (1802–9). He was one of the most prominent of the exiled officials used by Songyun to compile his gazetteer of Xinjiang, together with Qi Yunshi and Xu Song.
