= Changling (Qing dynasty) =

Qing official and soldier (1758–1838)

First Class Duke Weiyong Changling

Chief Grand Councillor
- In office 1823–1824
- Preceded by: Cao Zhenyong
- Succeeded by: Cao Zhenyong

Grand Secretary of the Wenhua Hall
- In office 1822–1838

Assistant Grand Secretary
- In office 1821–1822

General of Ili
- In office 1825–1827
- Preceded by: Deying'a
- Succeeded by: Deying'a
- In office 1815–1817
- Preceded by: Songyun
- Succeeded by: Jinchang

Viceroy of Shaan-Gan
- In office 1825–1825
- Preceded by: Nayancheng
- Succeeded by: Ošan (acting)
- In office 1817–1822
- Preceded by: Hening (acting)
- Succeeded by: Zhu Xun (acting)
- In office 1813–1814
- Preceded by: Nayancheng
- Succeeded by: Siyanfu
- In office 1807–1809
- Preceded by: Fang Weidian
- Succeeded by: Cai Tingheng

Viceroy of Yun-Gui
- In office 1825–1825
- Preceded by: Han Kejun (acting)
- Succeeded by: Zhao Shenzhen

Personal details
- Born: December 18, 1758 Beijing, China
- Died: January 26, 1838 (aged 79) Beijing, China

Changling (simplified Chinese: 长龄; traditional Chinese: 長齡; Manchu: ᠴᠠᠩᠯᡳᠩ cangling; December 18, 1758 – January 26, 1838) born in Sartuk clan (薩爾圖克氏), was a Qing dynasty official of Mongol descent. He began life in 1775 as a secretary of the Grand Council, after taking the Xiu cai degree at the Manchu examination. In 1787 he fought in Taiwan, and in 1792—95 against Nepaul. In 1800 he was in command of the expeditionary force sent against insurgent bands in Hubei, and subsequently in various operations undertaken from time to time against disturbances caused by the evil influence of secret societies. He became successively Governor of Anhui and Shandong, and in 1807 Viceroy of Shaan-Gan. In 1808 he was impeached on several charges and stripped of his rank, and then banished to Ili. A few months later he was once more employed, and gradually rose again to the highest posts. In 1825 he was General of Ili. In 1826, when the rebel Jahangir Khoja crossed the frontier and began his depredations, capturing Kashgar, Yangihissar, Yarkand and Khoten, he was appointed Generalissimo; and by the end of 1827 had captured Jehangir and put an end to the rebellion. The prisoner was sent to Beijing in a cage, and brained in the presence of the Daoguang Emperor, who conferred on Changling a triple-eyed peacock's feather. He was canonised as Wenxiang, and admitted into the Temple of Worthies.
