= Ortai =

Qing politician and first Earl Xiangqin

Third Class Count Xiangqin Ortai
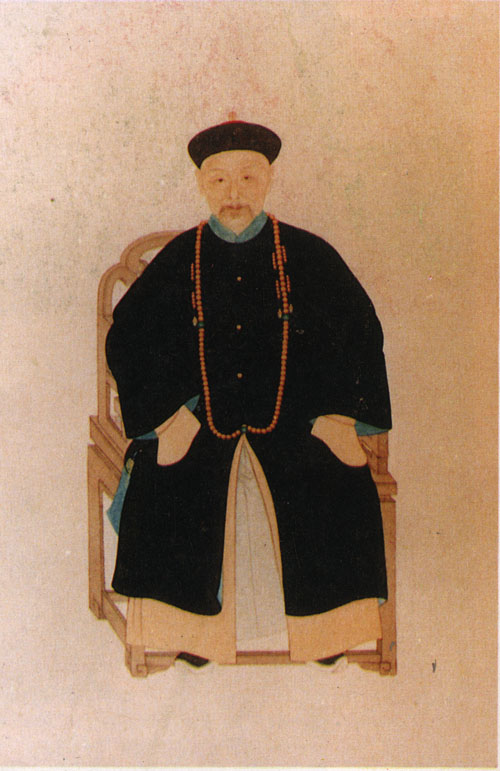

Chief Grand Councillor
- In office December 1733 – 14 May 1745
- Preceded by: Fupeng
- Succeeded by: Necin
- In office 22 February 1732 – May 1733
- Preceded by: Zhang Tingyu
- Succeeded by: Fupeng

Grand Secretary of the Baohe Hall
- In office 22 February 1732 – 14 May 1745

Viceroy of Yun-Gui & Guangxi
- In office 26 October 1728 – 20 November 1731
- Preceded by: Himself as the Viceroy of Yun-Gui
- Succeeded by: Gao Qizhuo

Viceroy of Yun-Gui
- In office 28 February 1726 – 26 October 1728
- Preceded by: Yang Mingshi
- Succeeded by: Himself as the Viceroy of Yun-Gui & Guangxi

Personal details
- Born: March 1680
- Died: 14 May 1745 (aged 65)
- Relations: Orki (brother), Oyonggo (son), Oning (son), Oši (son), Ocang (nephew)
- Parent: Oboi (鄂拜) (father)
- Education: juren degree in the Imperial Examination (1699)
- Clan name: Sirin Gioro
- Courtesy name: Yi'an (毅庵)
- Art name: Xilin (西林)
- Posthumous name: Wenduan (文端)

Military service
- Allegiance: Qing dynasty
- Branch/service: Manchu Bordered Blue Banner
- Battles/wars: Miao Rebellion (1735–1736)

Ortai (Manchu: ᠣᡵᡨᠠᡳ, romanized: ortai; Chinese: 鄂爾泰; pinyin: È'ěrtài) (1680 – 14 May 1745) was the first Earl Xiangqin. He was an eminent Manchu official from the Sirin Gioro clan, belonging to the Bordered Blue Banner, during the Qing dynasty (1644–1911). He served both the Yongzheng Emperor (reign 1722–1735) and the Qianlong Emperor (reign 1735–1796). Ortai governed the southwestern region of the Qing empire, Yun-Gui (modern day Yunnan and Guizhou), from around 1726–1731, and was responsible for putting down several Miao uprisings. He fell ill and died in 1745.

== Family ==
Ortai was originally wed to a woman of the Gūwalgiya clan, until she died. Then he married the daughter of Maizhu (邁柱), the Minister of the Board of Civil Offices. Ortai then refused to take on secondary spouses despite polygamous customs of aristocratic men of his generation. They had two daughters and six sons. His fourth son Oning (O-ning, Chinese: 鄂寧; pinyin: Èníng) also served as Viceroy of Yung-Gui for a short period in 1768.

His son Oyonggo (Chinese: 鄂容安, O-rong'an) succeeded him as Earl (and was honored with the prefix Xiangqin in 1749) before being killed in battle against the Dzungars in 1755. Oyonggo was posthumously honored in the Temple of Zealots of the Dynasty.

His younger son, O-shi (鄂實), was also posthumously honored in the Temple of Zealots of the Dynasty after dying in battle in 1758, near Yarkand.

== Career ==
=== Early career ===
Ortai rose quickly through the ranks in his youth, reportedly due to his reputation for incorruptibility. In 1699, Ortai became a juren, and by 1703, he was promoted to captain of his family's Banner company. The same year, he was promoted to Senior Imperial Bodyguard of the 3rd Rank.

In 1716, he was promoted again to the Assistant Department Director of the Imperial Household. After the emperor Yongzheng ascended in 1722, Ortai served as an examiner for the Yunnan province civil service exams, and then as financial commissioner of Jiangsu province.

=== Governorship ===
His first governorship was awarded in 1724, when he was made lieutenant governor of Jiangsu province. The next year, he was appointed acting governor-general (or Viceroy) of the restive southwestern provinces of Yunnan and Guizhou, although it took some time for him to assume office, as he had to first travel to Beijing and then to the provinces.

His assignment was to stabilize the region for Qing rule. The main source of resistance came from indigenous people of Yun-Gui, the Miao. The majority of his rule was focused on quelling local resistance to Qing rule, often relying on military force. His policy, called gaitu guiliu 改土归流, aimed to replace local hereditary rulers called Tusi with imperial bureaucrats, thereby placing the restive territories under a more firm grip of the central government. Guy has characterized Ortai's rule as a "Qing mission civilisatrice," while Elliott has said some might call Ortai ruthless.

During his time as governor, he put down several resistances, including in Guangshan (in Guizhou) in 1726, Changzhai (in Guizhou) in 1727, and Dongchuan in 1728. From 1727 to 1728, he dealt with local resistance in Cheli and other places in southwest Yunnan led by the Diao 刁 clan; these territories were re-organized into Pu'er prefecture. In 1727, he assisted the governor general of Sichuan in dealing with rebellions in Wumen and Zhengxiang. This territory was thereafter absorbed into Yunnan.

In reward for his efforts, he received several honors and promotions in rank. In 1727, he was promoted to minor hereditary rank of Qi duyu, and then Qingche duyu 1st Class. The following year, he was given the additional governor-generalship of Guangxi. In 1729, he was promoted again, to Baron, 3rd Class, and to Junior Guardian. Some scholars such as R. Kent Guy believe that the emperor valued Ortai's ability to represent his will in a sensitive territory, and that Ortai did not have real skill as a military leader.

After receiving this third governorship, he switched his policy and tried attracting local leaders, promising rewards for those who would submit and using force on those who resisted. Ortai dealt with more resistances in the next few years, including in Guzhou (in Guizhou) in 1729, and again in Wumeng in 1730.

Ortai has been described as a successful Qing governor by Kent and other scholars, as he took power from local leaders and placed it in the hands of the Qing. Ortai also increased the tax productive territory available to the empire via methods such as instituting mining reforms in Yunnan's salt and copper mining industries, increasing profits overall.

=== Promotion to Central Government ===
After his time as governor in the southwest, Ortai was promoted to several positions in the central government in Beijing, including: Grand Secretary, President of the Board of War, and Grand Councillor. From September 1732 – 1733, Ortai supervised military affairs in Shaanxi and Gansu provinces, and the supply transport for the campaign against the Dzungars. In 1733, he advised the Yongzheng emperor to make peace with the Dzungars.

In 1735, he was promoted to Viscount. That same year, he was sent with Zhang Tingyu and three princes (including the future Qianlong eEperor) to put down a rebellion at Taigong in Guizhou province. Zhang Zhao, an official charged with handling the rebellion, blamed Ortai for not having ensured a more lasting peace before he left Guizhou to take office in Beijing. Ortai took the blame for not having prevented this rebellion when he was governor general, and was demoted from hereditary rank.

Under the Qianlong Emperor, he held the highest rank of his career as Earl of the 3rd Class. From 1738 until his death in 1745, he served in many important posts and was given significant responsibilities, such as directing work on the Yellow River (1739), and directing many official publications (see "Writings" below). When he was ill and on his deathbed, in 1745, the Qianlong Emperor honored Ortai with the additional title of "Grand Tutor."

=== Posthumous Honors ===
Upon his death, the Qianlong emperor gave Ortai the ceremonial name Wenduan. Ortai was honored in the Imperial Ancestral Temple and in the Temple of Eminent Statesmen, though this latter honor was later retracted (see "Rivalry with Zhang Tingyu").

== Relationship with Yongzheng Emperor ==
Ortai was a confidant and advisor to the Yongzheng emperor, and under the Yongzheng emperor, he was the second most powerful Manchu in the empire.

The two likely met when Ortai was an imperial bodyguard, and the emperor was still a prince. According to Yuan Mei, an 18th-century poet, Ortai refused an order from the then-prince on the grounds that he served the emperor, and not his sons. This impressed the prince, who kept him in mind in the future for appointments.

The personal friendship and trust that Ortai enjoyed from the Yongzheng emperor allowed him greater authority as a governor. This friendship was sealed with regular gifts and even with a marriage. When the emperor's brother Prince Yi was betrothed to Ortai's cousin, the emperor wrote the governor saying he was happy that their families would be joined.

When the Yongzheng emperor was on his death bed, he ordered that upon Ortai's death (which did not happen for another ten years), he should be named in the Imperial Ancestral Temple as commendation for his service.

== Rivalry with Zhang Tingyu ==
Zhang was a confidant and advisor to the Yongzheng emperor, like Ortai was, and he enjoyed a similar amount of power. The two were the Yongzheng emperor's closest advisors, and were even with him at his death bed. The Yongzheng emperor had named the two counselors as advisors to his son, the Qianlong Emperor, during the transition period, and the Qianlong Emperor kept them.

In the early part of Qianlong's reign, Ortai and Zhang and their respective political followers became embroiled in power struggles. The factions had an ethnic element to them - Ortai's was Manchu, and Zhang's Han Chinese, generally - which worried Qianlong, who noted with displeasure that "the Manchus all depend for their thinking on Ortai, the Han all on Zhang Tingyu."

In 1743, the emperor learned that Ortai had covered up corruption on the part of one of his sons. Angry, the emperor warned Ortai "I have used you in the past and I am forgiving you now, but this is hardly a guarantee that I will not punish you severely in the future!"

In 1755, ten years after Ortai's death, the Qianlong emperor launched an investigation into Ortai's follower Hu Zhongzao. Hu was accused of having written anti-Manchu poems, and having disrespected the emperor. The quarrel with Zhang and his faction featured heavily in the writings. Hu was executed, and his friend O-chang - Ortai's nephew - was forced to commit suicide for having written poems "unfavorable to the Manchus." Ortai's name was removed from the Temple of Eminent Statesmen, as punishment for promoting factionalism.

== Writings and Publications ==
- 1725: Nanbang lixian ji 南邦黎献集, 16 juan
- 1742: Shoushi tongkao, 78 juan (illustrated treatise on agriculture)
- 1743: Yizhong jinjian, 90 + 1 juan (general treatise on medicine)
- 1745: Baqi Manzhou shizu tongpu, 80 + 2 juan (a genealogy of the Manchu clans and families)
- 1746 (posthumously): Baqi zeli 则例, 12 juan (on the laws governing Bannermen)
- 1746 (posthumously): Zhongshu zhengkao 中枢政考, 31 juan (on the laws governing the military affairs of the empire)
- San Li yishu (commentaries to the classics on ceremony)
- Baqi tongzhi (history of the Manchu Banner system)

Government offices
Preceded by Yang Mingshi (楊名時)	Viceroy of Yun-Gui; 1726-1731	Succeeded by Gao Qizhuo (高其倬)
