= Qi Yunshi =

Qi Yunshi (Chinese: 祁韻士, 1751–1815) was a Chinese official and historian exiled to Central Asia between 1805 and 1809 who together with Wang Tingkai and Xu Song was prominent among the exiled officials employed by Songyun, the military governor of Xinjiang from 1802 to 1809, to compile a gazetteer of Xinjiang. He also wrote a history of the Chinese border regions.
