= Xu Song (Qing dynasty) =

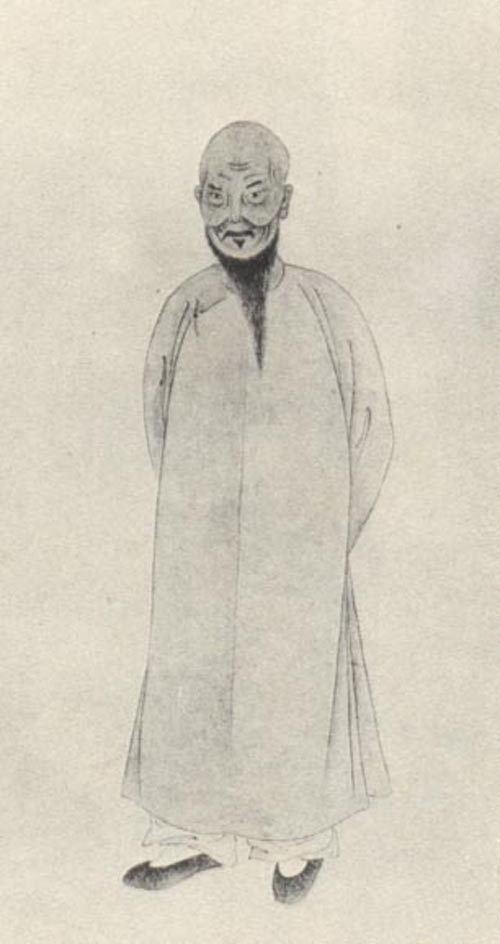
Xu Song's portrait

Xu Song (Chinese: 徐松, 1781–1848) was a Chinese official exiled to Central Asia during the period of the military governorship of Xinjiang of Songyun (1802 to 1809). He was prominent with Wang Tingkai and Qi Yunshi among the officials employed by Songyun to compile his gazetteer of Xinjiang.

In 1815–16 Xu explored the region as part of his work on the gazetteer project, visiting the Buddhist cave site at Dunhuang and other historic sites. Later he published his notes on his travels in the western regions of Chinese Empire.

In the tradition of exile poetry, Xu Song also published a book of poetry about Xinjiang.
