= Cao Zhenyong =

Chinese statesman

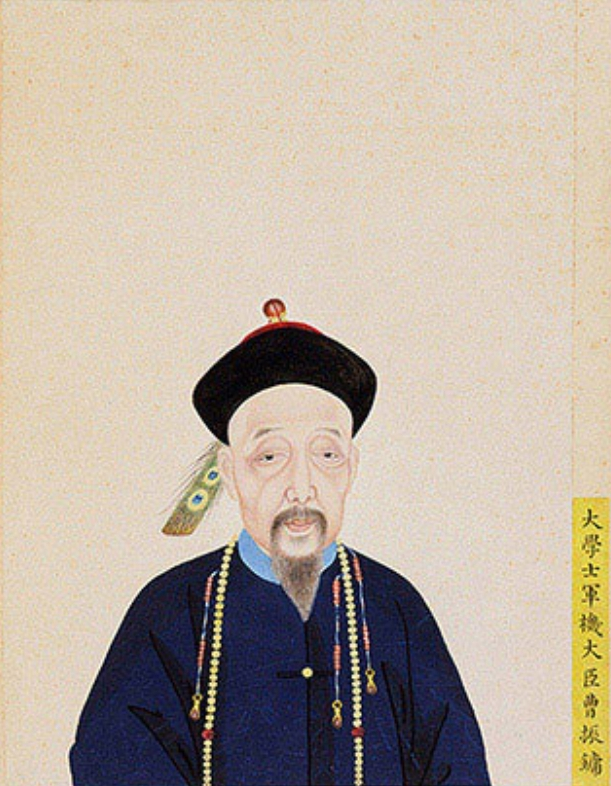

Chief Grand Councillor
- In office 15 May 1824 – 31 January 1835
- Preceded by: Changling
- Succeeded by: Wenfu
- In office 16 October 1820 – 16 May 1823
- Preceded by: Tojin
- Succeeded by: Changling

Grand Secretary of the Wuying Hall
- In office 12 October 1821 – 31 January 1835

Grand Secretary of the Tiren Library
- In office 12 October 1813 – 12 October 1821

Assistant Grand Secretary
- In office 19 September 1813 – 12 October 1813

Minister of Personnel
- In office 10 October 1813 – 14 October 1813
- Preceded by: Zou Bingtai
- Succeeded by: Zhang Xu

Minister of Revenue
- In office 19 August 1809 – 10 October 1813
- Preceded by: Dai Quheng
- Succeeded by: Pan Shi'en

Minister of Works
- In office 20 November 1806 – 19 August 1809
- Preceded by: Wang Zhiyi
- Succeeded by: Dai Quheng

Personal details
- Born: 8 November 1755 She County, Anhui, China
- Died: 31 January 1835 (aged 79) Beijing, China
- Parent: Cao Wenzhi (father)

Cao Zhenyong (simplified Chinese: 曹振镛; traditional Chinese: 曹振鏞; pinyin: Cáo Zhènyōng; 8 November 1755 – 31 January 1835) was a Chinese statesman of the Qing dynasty. He served in a leading position in the Grand Council under the Daoguang Emperor. He is widely believed to be responsible for the formalized style of government, which was promoted under the Daoguang Emperor's reign and contributed to the emperor's failure to reform the increasingly corrupt administration of the Qing Empire.
