= Heshen =

Chinese politician (1750–1799)

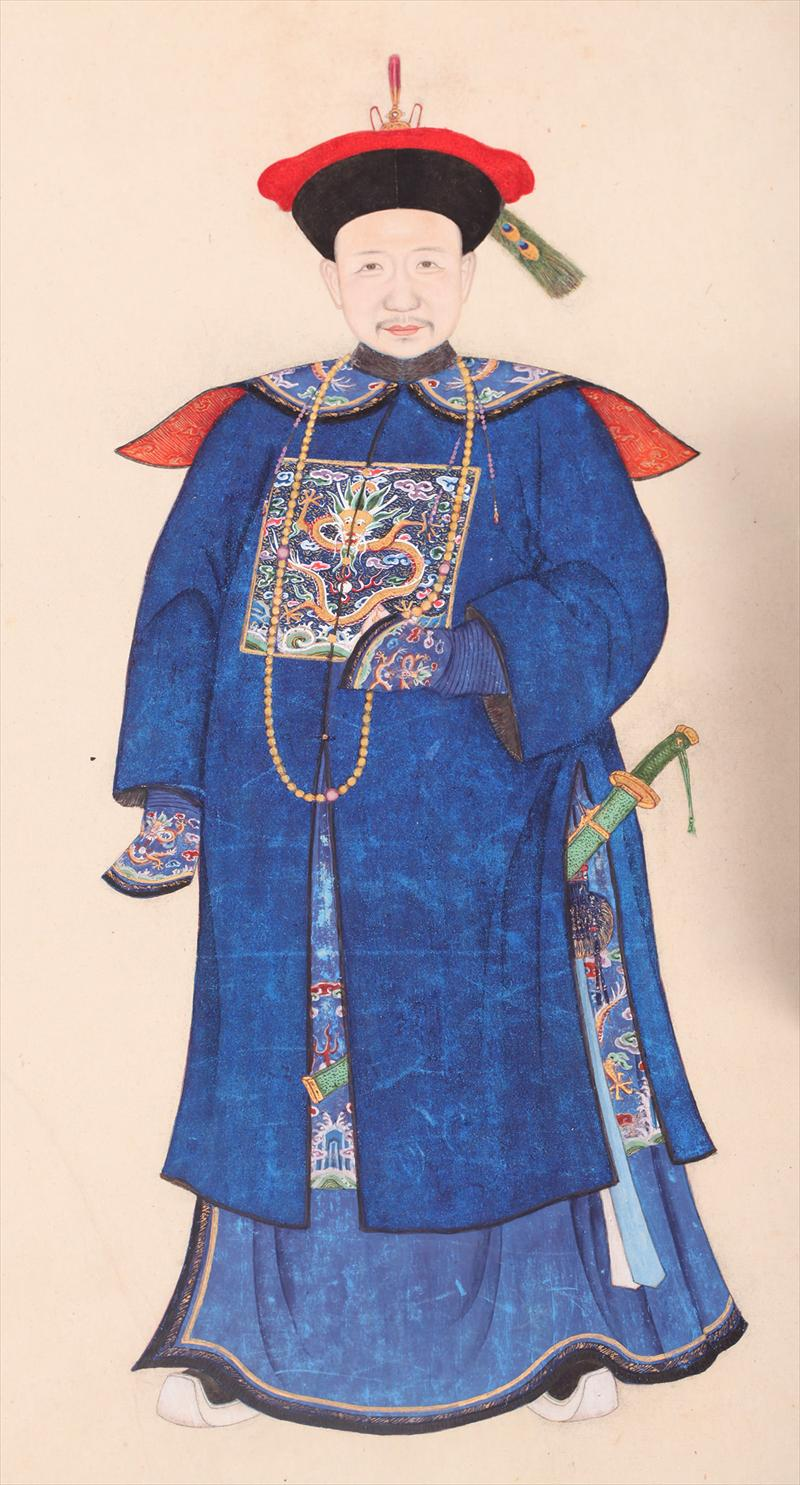

Chief Grand Councillor
- In office 12 October 1797 – 12 February 1799
- Monarch: Jiaqing Emperor
- Preceded by: Agui
- Succeeded by: Yongxing

Grand Councillor
- In office 22 April 1776 – 12 February 1799 (as the Chief Grand Councillor since 1797)
- Monarchs: Qianlong Emperor; Jiaqing Emperor

Grand Secretary of the Wenhua Hall
- In office 11 September 1786 – 2 February 1799
- Monarchs: Qianlong Emperor; Jiaqing Emperor
- Preceded by: Cai Xin
- Succeeded by: Dong Gao

Minister of Personnel
- In office 4 September 1784 – 16 September 1786 Serving with Liu Yong
- Monarch: Qianlong Emperor
- Preceded by: Umitai
- Succeeded by: Fuk'anggan

Minister of Revenue
- In office 26 April 1780 – 4 September 1784 Serving with Liang Guozhi
- Monarch: Qianlong Emperor
- Preceded by: Feng Yinglian
- Succeeded by: Fuk'anggan

Personal details
- Born: Shanbao (善保); 1 July 1750 Beijing, Qing Empire
- Died: 22 February 1799 (aged 48) Zhizhai, Beijing, Qing Empire
- Cause of death: Forced suicide by hanging
- Spouse: Feng Jiwen
- Domestic partner: Lady Chang
- Relations: Gurun Princess Hexiao (daughter-in-law); Helin (brother)
- Children: Fengšeninde; 1 son 3 daughters
- Occupation: Official
- Noble titles: Duke Yongxiang of the First Rank

Heshen (Manchu: ᡥᡝᡧᡝᠨ, romanized: Hešen; Chinese: 和珅; pinyin: Héshēn; Wade–Giles: Ho^{2}-shen^{1}; 1 July 1750 – 22 February 1799) of the Manchu Niohuru clan, was an official of the Qing dynasty. Favored by the Qianlong Emperor, he was described as the most corrupt official in Chinese history, having acquired, at the very least, an estimated 60 million taels of silver during his career, roughly equivalent to one year of the Qing government's fiscal revenue. After the death of Qianlong, the Jiaqing Emperor confiscated Heshen's wealth and forced him to commit suicide. Heshen is remembered as one of the richest men in history.

Born Shanbao (Shan-pao; 善保), his name was later changed to Heshen. His courtesy name was Zhizhai (Chih-chai; 致齋). He was a member of the Plain Red Banner.

== Ascendance ==
Heshen was the son of a Manchu military officer of the Plain Red Banner and studied at the 'Palace of Universal Peace', a school for the children of Bannermen. He lost his mother when he was young and it was said he and his younger brother had a hard life under his stepmother. However, Heshen was an excellent student, knowing Middle Mandarin, Manchu, Mongolian and Tibetan. He was described as being "handsome, affable, self-possessed and exceedingly clever with his tongue."

In 1772, he started work as an imperial bodyguard. Three years later, in 1775, he was transferred to the Forbidden City, where he met the Qianlong Emperor. Within a year of this meeting, Heshen was promoted to junior vice-president of the Board of Revenue. Two months later, he was made a Grand Councillor. Within three months, he was promoted even further to the Minister of the Imperial Household Department, a post usually filled with the most meritorious officials. In the same year, Heshen was given appointments in the Board of Civil Office and Grand Secretariat. Within these offices, Heshen simultaneously held top posts, giving him great influence within the bureaucracy. For example, in 1784, Heshen held the posts of assistant grand secretary as well as "president of the ministries of personnel and finance." With a foothold in the Grand Council, and with influence in the Board of Punishments, his authority was second only to the Qianlong and later Jiaqing Emperors. In 1777, at the age of 27, Heshen was given the privilege of riding a horse within the Forbidden City, a prestigious privilege given only to high-ranking officials of elderly age.

Heshen's hold on the Qianlong Emperor was further strengthened when in 1790, his own son was married to the emperor's tenth and favorite daughter, Princess Hexiao. Once secure of the Qianlong Emperor's favor and approbation, Heshen enjoyed great freedom of action. His power only increased as the Qianlong Emperor grew older. By the time of Qianlong's abdication in 1796, (particularly after the death of Agui, a powerful opponent, in 1797) Heshen had solidified his control over the Qing throne, practically becoming a regent.

He became openly corrupt and practiced extortion on a grand scale. Thanks to his ties to the Qianlong Emperor and his existing authority, he was able to influence practically every post assignment within the nation. He used this authority to build up political alliances and increase his power base, by appointing his own men to key military and civil posts. His supporters within the imperial system followed his lead, and his military associates prolonged campaigns in order to continue the benefits of additional funds. He arrogated powers and official posts, including that of Grand Councillor, and regularly stole public and military funds, and tax revenue. He demanded "gifts" from officials who owed their positions to him, in return for his continued patronage and protection. As a result of this, he accumulated a huge fortune.

Taxes were raised again and again, and this led to the suffering of the people. Unfortunately, their suffering was compounded by severe floods of the Yellow River—an indirect result of the corruption where officials pocketed funds that were meant for the upkeep of canals and dams. Said corruption led to the river flooding 17 times between 1797 and 1819. Rising prices of rice led to many that simply starved to death. This widespread corruption and nepotism was the start of a century that led to the downfall of the Qing dynasty.

The Salar Jahriyya Sufi revolt was put down by Fuk'anggan along with Agui and Li Shiyao Gansu in 1784, but Heshen was recalled for his failure during the revolt.

In 1793, Heshen was responsible for hosting the Macartney Embassy to the imperial court.

== Downfall and suicide ==
After the Qianlong Emperor formally abdicated in February 1796, the range and damage of Heshen's corruption was now clear. However, Qianlong continued to rule China behind the scenes under the grand title of Taishang Huang (Retired Emperor). It was not until Qianlong's death on 7 February 1799 that his successor, the Jiaqing Emperor, was able to prosecute Heshen. Just five days later, on 12 February, Heshen was arrested and stripped of his offices, along with his close ally, Fuchang'an (who was placed under house arrest but escaped execution). He was declared guilty by an imperial edict issued on 15 February, and was condemned to slow slicing. Out of respect for his sister, Princess Hexiao, and the Qianlong Emperor, the Jiaqing Emperor spared Heshen this dishonorable death, instead ordering him to commit suicide by hanging. He carried out the sentence with a rope of golden silk in his home on 22 February.

In the 24 years that Heshen enjoyed the Qianlong Emperor's attention and favor, he amassed a fortune. In the Jiaqing Emperor's confiscation of Heshen's property, his estate included:

2,790 rooms in his estates and mansions, 12,000 acres (49 km^{2}) of land, 10 bank branches, 10 pawnbroker branches, 58,000 taels of pure gold, 100 large ingots of pure gold, (1,000 taels each), 56,600 medium silver ingots, (100 taels each), 5,830,000 small silver ingots, (10 taels each), 58,000 foreign silver dollars, 1,500,000 copper coins, 300 kilograms of top-quality Jilin ginseng, 1,200 jade charms, 230 pearl bracelets, 10 large pearls, 10 large rubies, and dozens of place settings in solid gold or silver. He also had 14,300 bolts of fine silk, 20,000 sheets of fine sheep-fur wool, 550 fox hides, 850 raccoon dog hides, 56,000 sheep and cattle hides of varying thickness, 7,000 sets of fine clothing (for all four seasons), 361,000 bronze and tin vases and vessels, 100,000 porcelain vessels made by famous masters, 24 highly decorative solid-gold beds (each with eight different types of inlaid gemstones), and 460 high quality European clocks.

His wealth at the time of its confiscation was ultimately estimated to be between 60-80 million taels of silver in movable property alone, reputed to be equivalent to the imperial revenue of the Qing government for a year. Total estimates of his wealth range from 100 million to 800 million taels, although the higher figures are disputed by historians. Treasures discovered in his chief butler Liu Quan's quarter included 240,000 silver taels. The Jiaqing Emperor charged Heshen with 20 crimes, including various abuses of power, disrespecting imperial prerogatives, and hoarding wealth.

Heshen exemplified the widespread corruption of the civil bureaucracy and military under the Qing dynasty. Heshen's influence spread and corrupted both the civil and military establishment. This corruption contributed to unrest and rebellions across China. Bannermen developed wanton habits steeped in vice, such as gambling, drinking, theatre-going, and smoking of opium, that made them increasingly useless as a military force. The Green Standard Army was beset with irregular practice and had lost much of its fighting spirit shown in the early Qing dynasty, something which was noted by the Qianlong Emperor.

The Qianlong Emperor's Ten Great Campaigns were completed at the cost of 120 million taels against an annual revenue of some 40 million taels, depressed by embezzling from officials such as Heshen. These massive government spendings, along with conflicts such as the White Lotus and Miao rebellions, contributed to financial instability during the latter half of the 18th century. Suppressing the rebellions alone almost bankrupted the imperial treasury.

== Alternative views ==
Historians such as Daniel McMahon argue that the portrayal of Heshen as a classic villain was intentional, contrived by the Jiaqing Emperor to fulfil his own goals.

Prior to his downfall in 1799, official Qing records portrayed Heshen in a positive light. Heshen was said to be a master linguist, talented with foreign affairs, and laboured arduously under the Qianlong Emperor. Direct criticism only surfaced after the Jiaqing Emperor levelled the 20 charges against Heshen in 1799. The veracity of these charges could also be called into question. The true scale of Heshen's wealth (often touted as 200+ million taels) could be exaggerated, and no evidence was found of misuse of public funds by the Grand Council under Heshen's leadership. Heshen's supposed falsifying of military reports are also difficult to verify, owing to a lack of evidence and the vagueness of the charges against him.

It is probable that the Jiaqing Emperor bore a personal grudge against Heshen. Even though he was the official emperor upon his father's abdication in 1796, Heshen continued to dominate the government. In fact, his power rose significantly following the abdication. As a result, Jiaqing was emperor in name only. Heshen, as a powerful official, threatened the authority of the Jiaqing Emperor. Officials during the Qianlong Emperor's reign may have feared or been jealous of his power. The Jiaqing Emperor could have used legal pretexts to legitimize these feelings and condemn Heshen to a death sentence. Facing an administrative crisis, Jiaqing orchestrated and weaponised an exaggerated portrait of Heshen, turning him into a scapegoat for the problems plaguing the Qing Empire (such as widespread corruption and nepotism, an inefficient army and bureaucracy, among others). This is supported by the fact that Heshen's supporters were pardoned and allowed to remain within the bureaucracy. This portrayal was used by the Emperor to legitimise and drum up support for his "Xianyu Reforms", which relied on ideological measures to promote bureaucratic honesty and public morality. Therefore, the Jiaqing Emperor successfully cast Heshen as a moral failure and himself as a symbol of virtue.

== Former residence ==
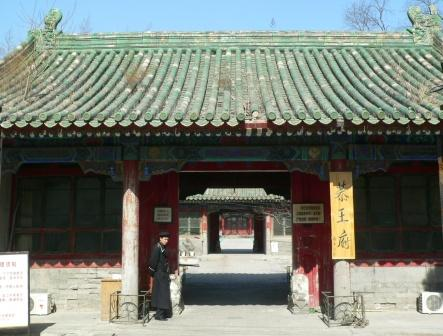
The Prince Gong Mansion in Beijing, which was the former residence of Heshen.

Several decades after Heshen's death, in 1850, his former residence was given to Prince Gong as his official residence. The estate, known as the Prince Gong Mansion, is now preserved as a museum and a tourist attraction. It is located at 17 Qianhai Road West in Beijing.

== In popular culture ==
For more than two hundred years Heshen has been a stock villain role, and continues to appear in theatrical, film and television productions. Chinese actors Wang Gang and Chen Rui have portrayed Heshen on screen: the former gave the character of Heshen a comical touch with his plump figure; the latter, who played Heshen in the 2003 television series Qianlong Dynasty, was said to resemble the historical Heshen more closely as compared to Wang Gang.

Hong Kong actor Ruco Chan played Heshen in the 2018 TVB series Succession War, a fictional depiction of the final 28 days of his life. In the 1988 TVB drama The Formidable Lady from Shaolin, Lau Kong portrayed Heshen as a corrupt, blood thirsty official who was ultimately executed.

== Family ==
- Maternal great-grandfather
  - Alana (阿喇納), Deputy General, Count of the Third Rank (副將軍三等伯)
- Maternal grandfather
  - Umitai (伍彌泰) (1713–1786), a Mongol of the Plain Yellow Banner
- Maternal grandmother
  - Lady Liugiya (劉佳氏)
- Father
  - Changbao (常保), Banner vice-commander of Fujian (福建副都統)
- Mother
  - Lady Umi (伍彌氏)
- Younger brother
  - Helin (和琳) (26 August 1753 – 28 September 1796), father of Fengšenimiyan and two daughters
- Younger sister-in-law
  - Lady Tatara (他他拉氏), daughter of Suringga (蘇凌阿), mother of Fengšenimiyan
- Nephew
  - Fengšenimiyan (豐紳宜綿) (1775–1813)
- Nieces
  - Two daughters of Helin
- Wife
  - Feng Jiwen (馮霽雯), granddaughter of Feng Yinglian (馮英廉); mother of Fengšenyende, Heshen's second son, and Heshen's three daughters
- Concubine
  - Lady Chang (長氏)
- Sons
  - Fengšenyende (豐紳殷德) (18 February 1775 – May 1810), married Gurun Princess Hexiao (固倫和孝公主)
  - second son (1794–?)
- Daughters
  - Three daughters, including Primary consort of Yongyun (Prince Chun (淳) peerage)

=== Genealogic tree ===
Namutai
Eluo'ershan
Changbao
Akechangba
Daughter of Akechangba
Heshen
Alana
Umitai
Lady Umi (伍彌)
Baidali
Lady Liugiya

== Sources ==
- Hummel, Arthur W. Sr., ed. (1943). "Ho-shên" . Eminent Chinese of the Ch'ing Period. United States Government Printing Office.
- Cheng, Pei-Kai; Lestz, Michael; Spence, Jonathan D. (1998). The Search for Modern China: A Documentary Collection. W.W. Norton & Company. ISBN 0-393-97372-7.
- Wang, Wensheng (2014). White Lotus Rebels and South China Pirates - Crisis and Reform in the Qing Empire. Harvard University Press. ISBN 978-0-674-72531-7.
- Harris, Lane J. (2018). "Chapter 3: The Case against Heshen, 1799". The Peking Gazette: A Reader in Nineteenth-Century Chinese History. Brill. ISBN 978-9004361003.
- Kahn, Harold L. (1971). Monarchy in the emperor's eyes: image and reality in the Chíen-lung reign. Harvard East Asian series. Cambridge, Mass: Harvard University Press. ISBN 978-0-674-58230-9.
- McMahon, Daniel (June 2008). "Dynastic Decline, Heshen, and the Ideology of the Xianyu Reforms". Tsing Hua Journal of Chinese Studies. 38 (2): 231–255.
- Barlett, Beatrice S. (1991). Monarchs and ministers: the Grand Council in Mid-Chʻing China, 1723-1820. Berkeley: University of California Press. ISBN 978-0-520-06591-8.
- Hsü, Immanuel (1990). The Rise of Modern China. Oxford Press. ISBN 0-19-512504-5.
- Elliott, Mark C. (2001), The Manchu Way: The Eight Banners and Ethnic Identity in Late Imperial China, Stanford: Stanford University Press, ISBN 978-1-134-36222-6
- Waley-Cohen, Joanna (2006), The Culture of War in China: Empire and the Military under the Qing Dynasty, London: I.B. Tauris, International Library of War Studies, ISBN 1845111591
