= Grand Council (Qing dynasty) =

Qing dynasty policy-making body

- Traditional Chinese: 軍機處
- Simplified Chinese: 军机处
Transcriptions
Standard Mandarin
- Hanyu Pinyin: Jūnjī Chù
- Wade–Giles: Chün-chi Ch'u

Banli Junji Shiwu Chu
- Traditional Chinese: 辦理軍機事務處
- Simplified Chinese: 办理军机事务处
- Literal meaning: Office for the Handling of Confidential Military Affairs
Transcriptions
Standard Mandarin
- Hanyu Pinyin: Bànlǐ Jūnjī Shìwù Chù
- Wade–Giles: Pan-li Chün-chi Shih-wu Ch'u

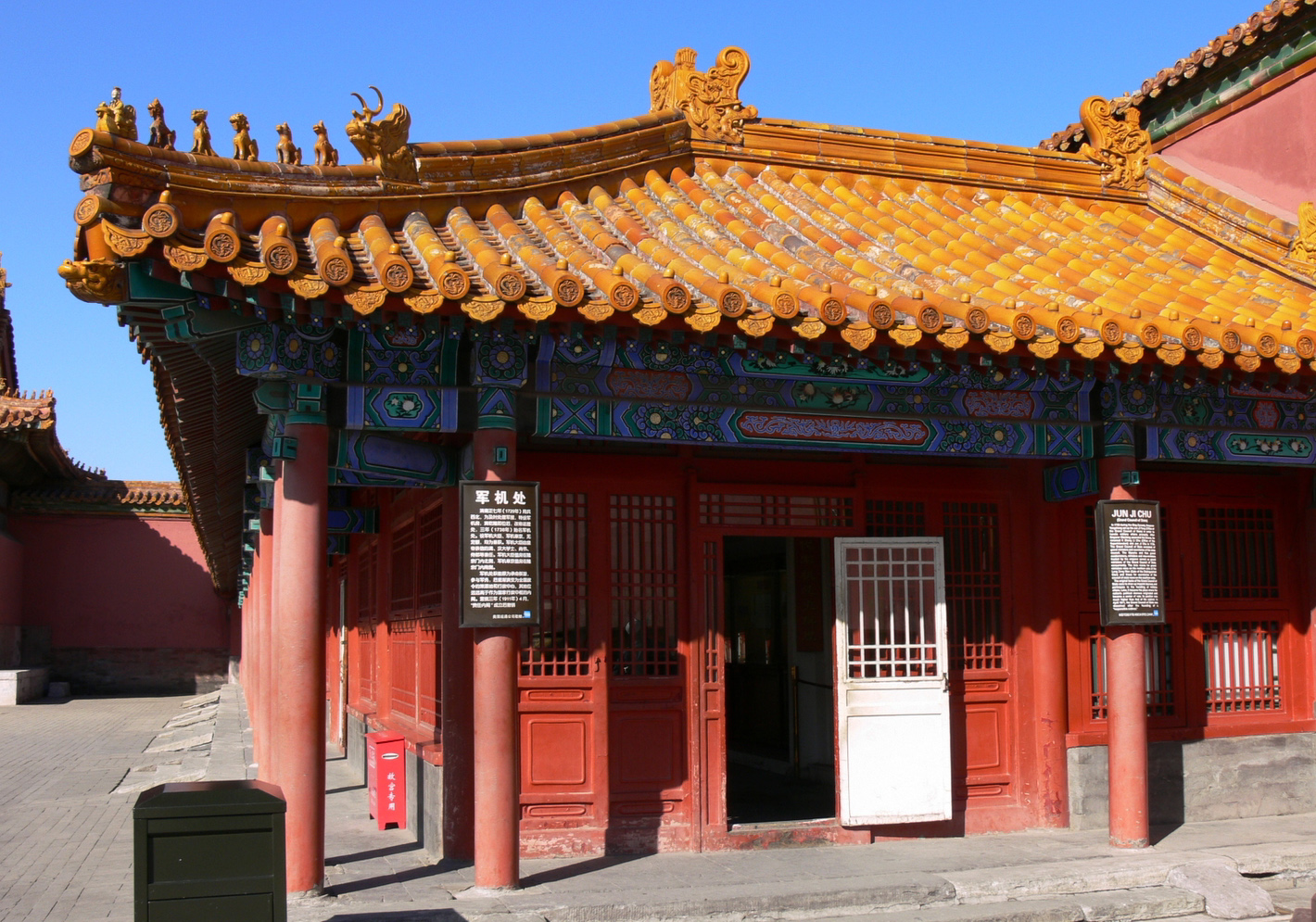
Duty office of the Grand Council in the Forbidden City in Beijing, a relatively inconspicuous building close to the emperor's quarters

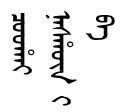
The Grand Council or Junji Chu (Chinese: 軍機處; lit. 'Office for Military and Confidential Affairs'; Manchu: coohai nashūn i ba), officially the Banli Junji Shiwu Chu (辦理軍機事務處; 'Office for Handling Military and Confidential Affairs'), was an important policy-making body of China during the Qing dynasty. It was established in 1733 by the Yongzheng Emperor. The council was originally in charge of military affairs, but gradually attained a more important role and eventually attained the role of a privy council, eclipsing the Grand Secretariat in function and importance, which is why it has become known as the "Grand Council" in English.

Despite its important role in the government, the Grand Council remained an informal policy making body in the inner court and its members held other concurrent posts in the Qing civil service. Originally, most of the officials serving in the Grand Council were Manchus, but gradually, Han Chinese officials were admitted into the ranks of the council. One of the earliest Han Chinese officials to serve in the council was Zhang Tingyu. The chancellery was housed in an insignificant building just west of the gate to the Palace of Heavenly Purity in the Forbidden City.

== Origins of the Grand Council ==
=== Council of Princes and High Officials ===
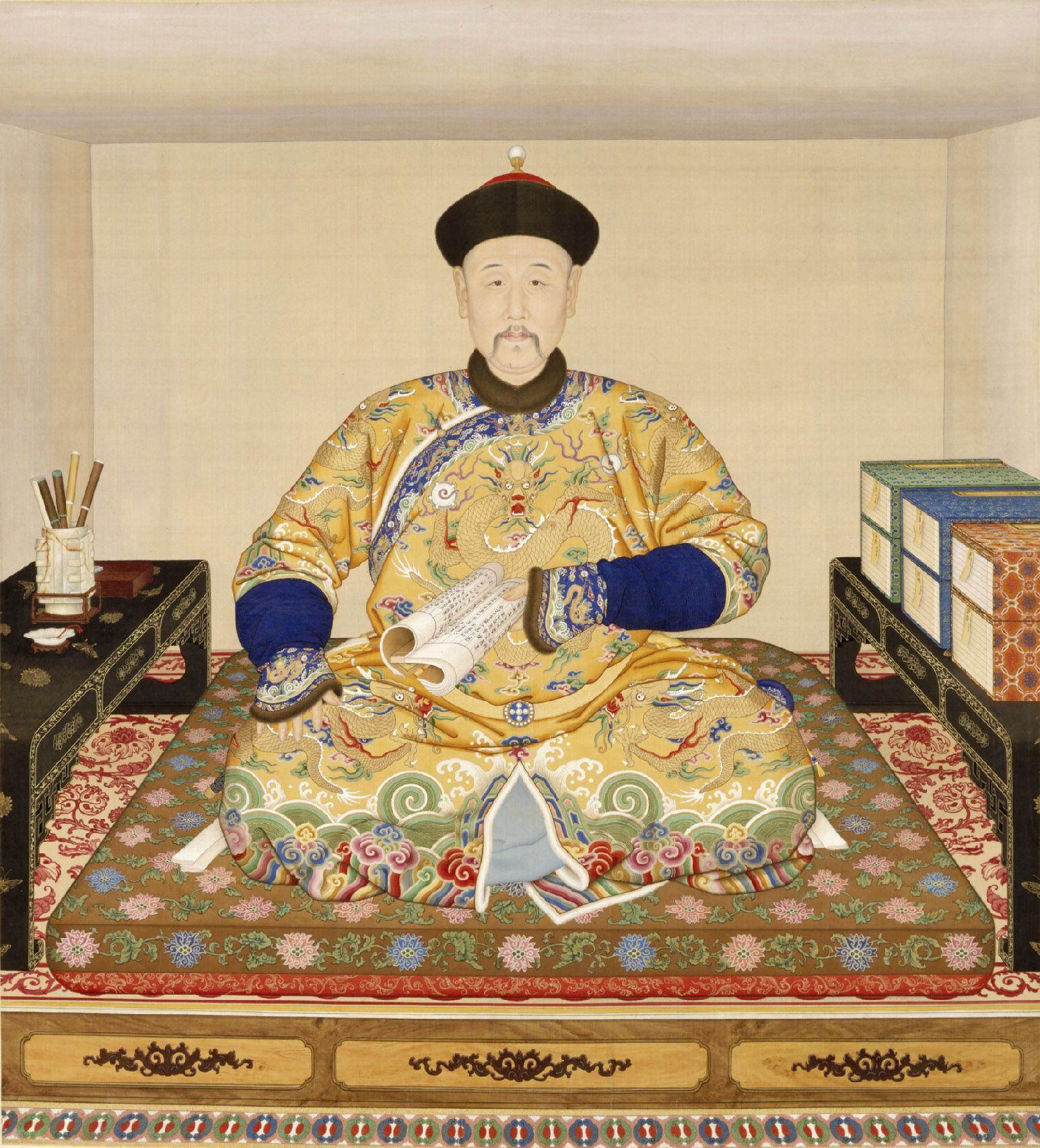
The Yongzheng Emperor (r. 1722–1735) established the Grand Council.

In the early Qing dynasty, political power was held by the Council of Princes and High Officials (議政王大臣會議), which consisted of eight imperial princes who served as imperial advisers at the same time. It also included a few Manchu officials. Established in 1637, the council was responsible for deciding major policies of the Qing government. Decisions of the council had precedence over decisions of the Grant Secretariat, the imperial cabinet. Under rules set by Nurhaci, the Council even had the power to depose the Emperor. In 1643, the Shunzhi Emperor expanded the council's composition to Han Chinese officials, with its mandate expanded to all important decisions relating to the Qing Empire. The council's powers gradually waned after the establishment of the Southern Study and the Grand Council, and it was abolished in 1717.

=== Southern Study ===
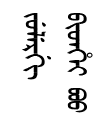
The Southern Study (Chinese: 南書房; pinyin: Nánshūfáng; Manchu: Julergi bithei boo) was an institution that held the highest policy-making power after its establishment in 1677. It was abolished in 1898. The Southern Study was built by the Kangxi Emperor in the southwestern corner of the Palace of Heavenly Purity. Members of the Hanlin Academy, selected based on literary merit, were posted to the Study so that the Emperor had easy access to them when he sought counsel or discussion. When posted to the Study, officials were known as "[having] access to the Southern Study" (南書房行走). Because of their proximity to the Emperor, officials posted to the Study became highly influential to the Emperor. After the establishment of the Grand Council, the Southern Study remained an important institution but lost its policy advisory role. Officials regarded secondment to the Southern Study as an honourable recognition of their literary achievements. In Chinese, the term "access to the Southern Study" in modern usage indicates a person who, through channels other than formal government office, has significant influence over leaders of the government.

=== Establishment of the Grand Council ===
In 1729, the Yongzheng Emperor launched a military offensive against the Dzungar Khanate. Concerns were raised that the meeting location of the Grand Secretariat (outside the Gate of Supreme Harmony) did not ensure security for military secrets. The Junjichu was then established in the Inner Court of the Forbidden City. Trustworthy members of Cabinet staff were then seconded to work in the new Office. After defeating the Dzungars, the Yongzheng Emperor found that the streamlined operations of the Office of Military Secrets avoided problems with bureaucratic inefficiency. As a result, the Junjichu turned from a temporary institution into a "Grand Council" in 1732, quickly outstripping the powers of the Council of Advisor Princes, and the Southern Study, to become the chief policy-making body of the Qing Empire.

== The Qing Grand Council (1738-1911) ==
=== The Interim Council and Reestablishing the Grand Council ===
In 1735, the Yongzheng Emperor died and was succeeded by his son, the Qianlong Emperor. Shortly before his death, the Yongzheng Emperor established an interim council to assist his son. The Interim Council soon consolidated many of the "Inner Court" agencies of the Yongzheng era, and expanded its power. Three years later, in 1738, the Interim Council disbanded and the Grand Council was reconstituted.

During the Qianlong Emperor's reign, the Grand Council had many duties. Some of them included more mundane duties such as keeping track of paperwork and planning events, including entertainments for the imperial court and transportation of the Emperor. Other duties were more tied to state administration, such as drafting edicts, and advising the Emperor on various policies and problems. Its proximity to the Emperor and inner court, secrecy, and unofficial status allowed it to expand and sustained its central role in state administration, and also freed it from some of the constraints of many of the outer-court agencies.

=== The Grand Council after the Qianlong era ===
In 1796, the Qianlong Emperor abdicated in favor of his son, the Jiaqing Emperor. Upon his father's death three years later, in 1799, the Jiaqing Emperor, along with purging his father's favorite, Heshen, who had served on the Grand Council since 1776, introduced numerous reforms to the Grand Council, including a reduction of the numbers of grand councilors, the introduction of administrative punishments for grand councilors, and the regulation of Grand Council clerk appointments by imperial audiences.

=== The Grand Council Under Empress Dowager Cixi ===
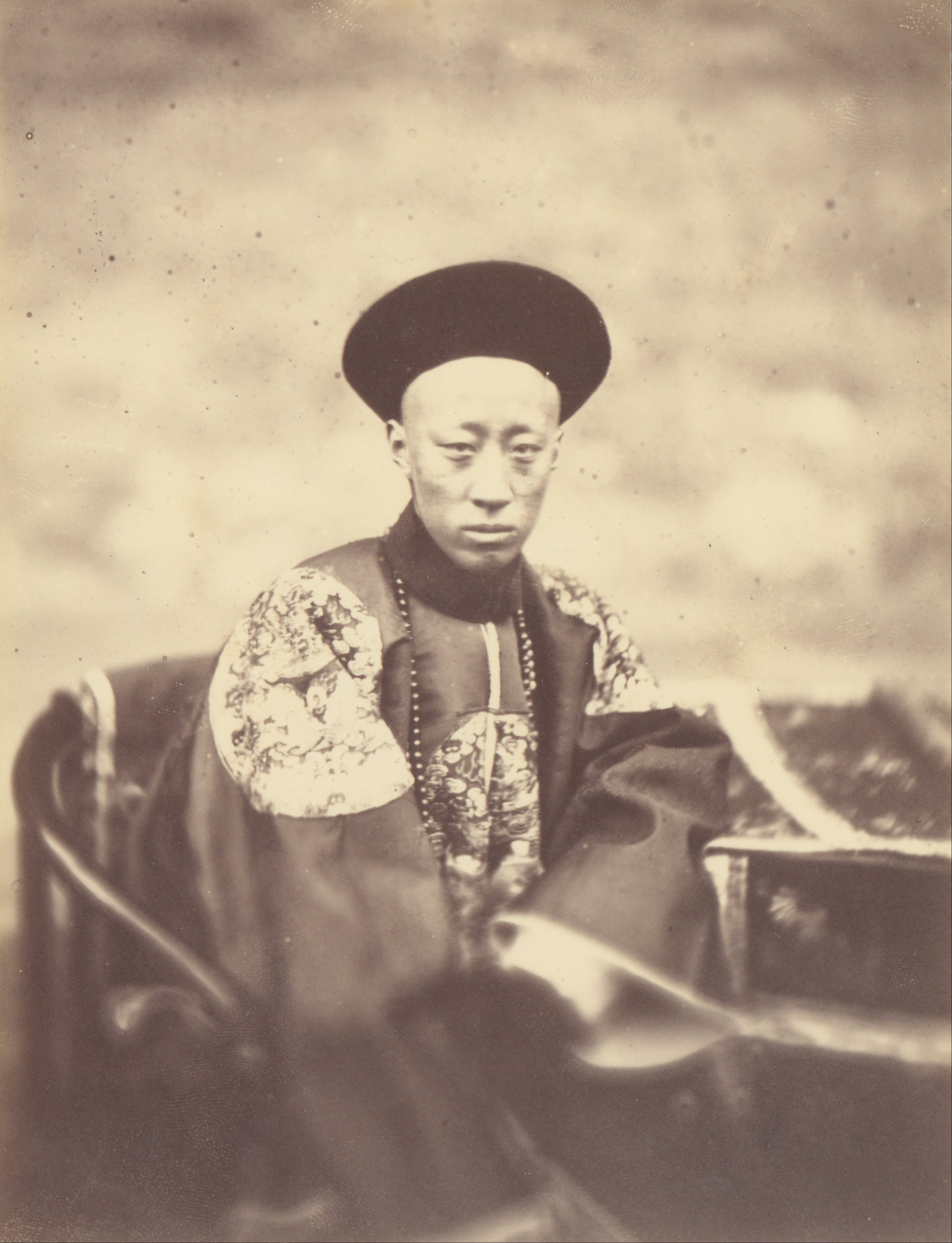
Prince Gong (1833-1898), a prominent Grand Councilor during the reign of his brother, the Xianfeng Emperor, and in the court of Empress Dowager Cixi.

During the regencies of the empress dowagers Ci'an and Cixi, the Grand Council took on many of the decision-making duties, particularly as the two women were novices in affairs of state. Soon after the two women became regents for the Tongzhi Emperor in 1861, edicts went out detailing how state papers and affairs were to be dealt with, with many of the policies being decided by the Grand Council. Papers were to be first sent to the empress dowagers, who would refer them back to the Prince-Regent, Prince Gong, who oversaw the Grand Council. The Grand Council would then discuss the issue and seek the discretion of the empress dowagers and draft up orders accordingly, with edict drafts having to be approved by the empress dowagers. Such a configuration would lead Zeng Guofan to remark, after an audience in 1869, that "the state of affairs hinged entirely on the Grand Councilors....whose power surpassed that of the imperial master." This configuration survived the regency for the Tongzhi Emperor and lasted into the regency of the Guangxu Emperor.

After the Guangxu Emperor formally took over the reins of power from his regent, Empress Dowager Cixi, both the Grand Council and the Emperor often sought the advice of the Empress Dowager, who was kept informed of state affairs. In fact, in 1894, with the outbreak of the First Sino-Japanese War in 1894, copies of memoranda from the Grand Council were sent both to the Guangxu Emperor and Empress Dowager Cixi, which was practiced until 1898, at which point the Empress Dowager resumed her "tutelage" of the Guangxu Emperor. From that time until the nearly simultaneous deaths of Empress Dowager Cixi and the Guangxu Emperor a decade later, they jointly received the Grand Council at audiences.

=== Abolition ===
With the deaths of Empress Dowager Cixi and the Guangxu Emperor in 1908, Puyi, Guangxu's nephew, succeeded the throne. Eventually, in May 1911, Puyi's father, Prince Chun, who was Prince-Regent, abolished the Grand Council, favoring an "Imperial Cabinet". Yikuang, the Prime Minister at the time, founded the first Imperial Cabinet in 1911. The Qing dynasty, despite this concession to those calling for reform, collapsed not long after.

== Composition ==
The number of officials comprising the Council varied from time to time, from as few as three to as many as ten. Usually, the number of officials serving in the council was five, two Manchus, two Han Chinese, and one Prince of the First Rank, who acted as the council's president. The most senior among them was called the Chief Grand Councillor (領班軍機大臣; lǐngbān jūnjī dàchén), but this was simply a working designation and was not an official title.

== Notable Grand Council members ==
- Zhang Tingyu
- Heshen
- Sushun
- Prince Gong
- Prince Chun
- Weng Tonghe
- Ronglu
- Prince Qing
- Qu Hongji
- Tan Sitong, a Military Secretary of Grand Council (軍機章京), executed for supporting the Hundred Days Reform
- Yu Minzhong (Chief)
