= List of Qing dynasty princes consorts =

The Qing dynasty developed a complicated system of ranks and titles. Princess's consort was granted a title of efu (Manchu:ᡝᡶᡠ; Chinese: 额驸; 額駙; éfù), meaning "imperial charioter". However, the title was not granted to the spouses of clanswoman (untitled princesses or daughters of low-ranking clansmen). An efu retained his title and privileges as long as the princess remained his primary spouse – even after her death. However, if an efu remarried or promoted another consort to be his primary spouse, he lost all rights obtained from his marriage to the princess.

The following alphabetical lists contains the efus recorded in the imperial genealogy. However, not all efus are mentioned because daughters of princes not adopted into the palace were not recorded in genealogy of the Aisin Gioro clan.

== Ranks of efus ==
| Title | Translation | Title equivalent | Rank |
|---|---|---|---|
| Gurun efu | Prince Consort of the First Rank | Prince of the Fourth Rank | Above the rank |
| Heshuo efu | Prince Consort of the Second Rank | Imperial duke | Above the rank |
| Heshuo efu | Prince Consort of the Third Rank | Defender General | 1 |
| Duoluo efu | Prince Consort of the Fourth Rank | Bulwark General | 2 |
| Duoluo efu | Prince consort of the Fifth Rank | Supporter General | 3 |
| Gushan efu | Prince Consort of the Sixth Rank | Grace General | 4 |
| Xiangjun efu | Prince Consort of the Seventh Rank | | 5 |

== List of princes consorts by the direct emperor's daughters ==
The list is constructed according to the imperial princesses being daughters of emperors and clans of the princes consorts.

=== Daughters of Taksi ===
| Year | Prince Consort | Clan of Prince Consort | Princess | Mother of princess | Issue | Reference |
|---|---|---|---|---|---|---|
| NN | Changzhu (常住) | Ulanara | First daughter (1558–1632) | Princess Jantai, lady Janggiya | Cambu (查木布) | |
| 1583 | Gahashan Hashu (噶哈善哈思虎; 1560–1584) | Irgen Gioro | Janhegu (沾河姑), Princess Jing'an of the Second Rank (和碩静安公主; d.23 October 1624) | Emeci, lady Hitara, Empress Xuan | | |
| 1585 | Yangshu (杨书) | Gorolo | Janhegu (沾河姑), Princess Jing'an of the Second Rank (和碩静安公主; d.23 October 1624) | Emeci, lady Hitara, Empress Xuan | three sons, including Darhan | |

=== Daughters of Nurhaci ===
==== Biological daughters ====
| Year | Prince Consort | Clan of Prince Consort | Princess | Mother of princess | Issue | Reference |
|---|---|---|---|---|---|---|
| 1588 | Hohori (何和礼;1561–1624) | Donggo | Nenzhe, Princess Duanzhuang of the First Rank (固伦端庄公主 嫩哲) | Hahana Jacing, lady Tunggiya | 1.Dulei (杜雷) 2.Dojili (多济理) | |
| NN | Yilaka (伊拉喀) | NN | Princess of the Second Rank, Yanzhe (和硕公主颜哲;1587-1646) | Secondary consort, lady Irgen Gioro | | |
| 1607 | Darhan (达尔汉;1590-1644) | Gorolo | Princess of the Second Rank, Yanzhe (和硕公主颜哲;1587-1646) | Secondary consort, lady Irgen Gioro | | |
| 1601 | Urgudai | Nara clan | Mangguji (莽古济;1590-1636) | Gundei, lady Fuca | 1.Princess Consort Keqin of the Second Rank, wife of Yoto | |
| 1627 | Sodnom Dügüreng (索諾木杜棱/索诺木杜棱; d. 1644) | Aohan Borjigin | Mangguji (莽古济;1590-1636) | Gundei, lady Fuca | | |
| 1608 | Bujantai | Ulanara | Mukushen, Princess of the Second Rank(穆库什;1595-1659) | Zhenge, lady Giyamuhut Gioro | 6.Maomo'ergen (茂莫尔根) 8.Gaduhun(噶都浑) 10.Hongkuang (洪匡) | |
| NN | Eidu | Niohuru | Mukushen, Princess of the Second Rank(穆库什;1595-1659) | Zhenge, lady Giyamuhut Gioro | 8.Turgei 16.Ebilun 17.Sosohun Fiyanggu (died prematurely) 3.Wife of Nikan | |
| 1621 | Turgei | Niohuru | Mukushen, Princess of the Second Rank(穆库什;1595-1659) | Zhenge, lady Giyamuhut Gioro | | |
| 1608 | Daki (达启) | Niohuru | Fifth Daughter (1597–1613) | Zhenge, lady Giyamuhut Gioro | | |
| 1613 | Suna (苏纳/苏鼐) | Yehe Nara | Sixth Daughter (1600–1646) | Zhenge, lady Giyamuhut Gioro | 1.Suksaha | |
| 1619 | Ejai (鄂扎伊) | Nara clan | Lady of the Third Rank (1604–1685) | Mistress, lady Irgen Gioro | | |
| 22.02.1625 | Gürbüshi (古爾布什/古尔布什; d. 1661) | Khalkha Borjigin | Princess of the Second Rank, Songgutu (和硕公主松古图;28 December 1612 – 1646) | Secondary consort, lady Yehe | | |

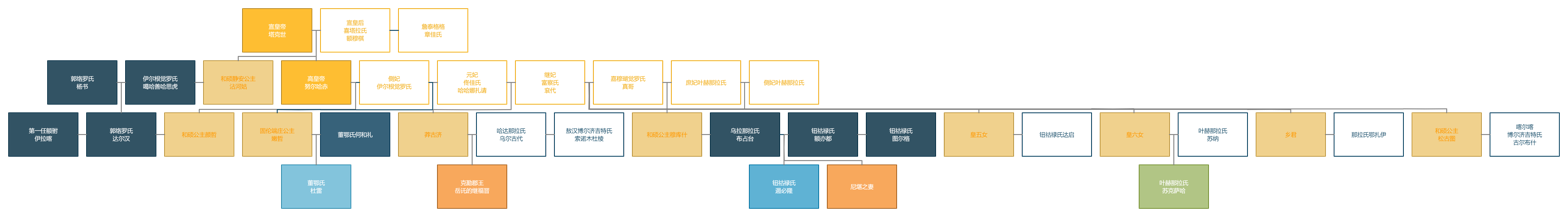
A genealogical tree depicting the colligations of daughters of Nurhaci

==== Adopted daughters and granddaughters ====
| Year | Prince Consort | Clan of Prince Consort | Princess | Background | Issue | Reference |
|---|---|---|---|---|---|---|
| 1617 | Enggeder (恩格德尔) | Khalkha Borjigin | Princess Duanshun of the Second Rank Sundai (和硕端顺公主孙岱,1590-1649) | Father:Šurhaci Mother:Primary princess consort Zhuang, Lady Guwalgiya | 4.Erke Daicing (额尔克戴青) 5.Surha (素尔哈) | |
| 1626 | Aoba(奥巴) | Khorchin Borjigin/ Tüsheet Khan | Princess of the Second Rank Zhunzhe (和硕公主肫哲) | Father:Tulun, Prince Kexi of the Third Rank Mother:Princess Consort Kexi of the Third Rank, Lady Wanyan Paternal grandfather:Šurhaci Paternal grandmother:Primary princess consort Zhuang, Lady Guwalgiya | 1.Badali | |
| 1632 | Badali (巴大礼) | Khorchin Borjigin/ Tüsheet Khan | Princess of the Second Rank Zhunzhe (和硕公主肫哲) | Father:Tulun, Prince Kexi of the Third Rank Mother:Princess Consort Kexi of the Third Rank, Lady Wanyan Paternal grandfather:Šurhaci Paternal grandmother:Primary princess consort Zhuang, Lady Guwalgiya | | |

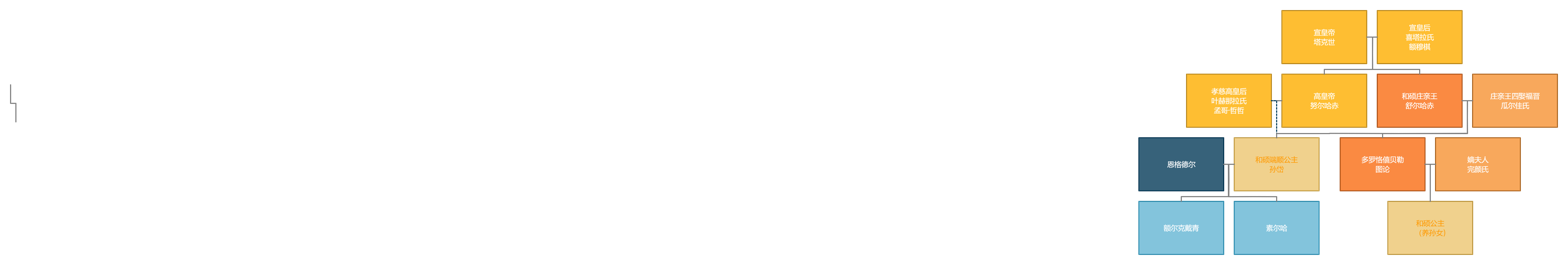
Colligations of adoptive daughters of Nurhaci

=== Daughters of Hong Taiji ===
==== Biological daughters ====
| Year | Prince Consort | Clan | Princess | Mother | Issue | References |
|---|---|---|---|---|---|---|
| 1633 | Bandi | Aohan Borjigin | Princess Aohan of the First Rank (敖汉固伦公主) | Lady Ula Nara | 1.Morgen Baturu Wenbu (摩尔根巴图鲁温布) | |
| 1636 | Ejei Khan | Chahar Borjigin | Princess Wenzhuang of the First Rank (固伦温庄公主马喀塔;1625-1663) | Empress Xiaoduanwen | 1.Princess Consort Xianque of the First Rank (显悫亲王福晋) | |
| 1645 | Abunai | Chahar Borjigin | Princess Wenzhuang of the First Rank (固伦温庄公主马喀塔;1625-1663) | Empress Xiaoduanwen | 1.Princess Consort Zhuangjing of the First Rank (庄靖亲王福晋) | |
| 1639 | Kitad (奇塔特,1620-1653) | Khorchin Borjigin | Princess Jingduan of the First Rank Dazhe (固伦靖端公主达哲) | Empress Xiaoduanwen | 1.Prince of the Second Rank Erdeni | |
| 1641 | Birtakhar | Khorchin Borjigin | Princess Yongmu of the First Rank Yatu (固伦雍穆公主雅图) | Empress Dowager Xiaozhuang | 1.Eqir | |
| 1643 | Surha (素尔哈) | Khalkha Borjigin | Princess Shuhui of the First Rank Atu (固伦淑慧公主阿图) | Empress Dowager Xiaozhuang | | |
| 1648 | Sabdan (色布腾) | Barin Borjigin | Princess Shuhui of the First Rank Atu (固伦淑慧公主阿图) | Empress Dowager Xiaozhuang | 1.Eqir (鄂齐尔) 2.Gelertu (格勒尔图) 3.Namuzha (那木札) | |
| 1644 | Kuazha (夸札) | Irgen Gioro | Princess of the First Rank (固伦公主, 1633–1649) | Lady Jarud Borjigin | | |
| 1645 | Lamasi (喇玛思) | JarudBorjigin | Princess Shuzhe Duanxian of the First Rank (固伦淑哲端献公主) | Empress Dowager Xiaozhuang | | |
| 1645 | Bayasihulang (巴雅斯户朗) | Khorchin Borjigin | Princess Yong'an Duanzhen of the First Rank (固伦永安端贞公主) | Empress Xiaoduanwen | | |
| 1648 | Hashang (哈尚) | Borjigin | Ninth daughter (1635–1652) | Lady Jarud Borjigin | | |
| 1651 | Huisai (辉塞) | Gūwalgiya | Lady of the Second Rank (1635–1661) | Lady Nara | | |
| 1647 | Garma Sodnam (噶爾瑪索諾木/噶尔马索诺木; d. 1663) | Abaga Borjigin | Princess Duanshun of the First Rank (固伦端顺公主) | Noble Consort Yijing, Namjung | | |
| 1651 | Bandi (班第) | Borjigin | Lady of the Third Rank (9 April 1637 – November/December 1678) | Lady Sayin Noyan | | |
| 1652 | Laha (拉哈) | Gūwalgiya | 13th daughter (16 August 1638 – May/June 1657) | Lady Nara | | |
| 9.10.1653 | Wu Yingxiong | Wu | Princess Kechun of the Second Rank Ajige (和硕恪纯公主阿济格;7 January 1642 – 1704) | Lady Chahar Cilei | 1. Wu Shilin (吴世霖); 2. Wife of Ga'ertu (噶尔图); 3. Mistress of Prince Gong Changning | |

==== Adopted daughters ====
| Year | Prince Consort | Clan | Princess | Background | Issue | References |
|---|---|---|---|---|---|---|
| 1628 | Manzhuxili | Khorchin Borjigin | Princess of the Second Rank | Father: Yoto Mother: Princess Consort Keqin of the Second Rank, lady Nara | 1.Princess Consort Chengzeyu of the First Rank | |

=== Daughters of the Shunzhi Emperor ===
==== Biological daughter ====
| Year | Prince Consort | Clan | Princess | Mother | Issue | Reference |
|---|---|---|---|---|---|---|
| February/March 1667 | Na'erdu (纳尔杜) | Gūwalgiya | Princess Gongque of the Second Rank (和硕恭悫公主,19 January 1654 – 26 November 1685) | Lady Yang, Mistress | | |

==== Adopted daughters ====
| Year | Prince Consort | Clan | Princess | Background | Issue | Reference |
|---|---|---|---|---|---|---|
| 1660 | Shang Zhilong | Shang | Princess Heshun of the Second Rank (和硕和顺公主, 8 October 1648 – 25 January 1691) | Father: Šose Mother: Princess Consort Chengzeyu of the First Rank, lady Nara | 1. Princess Consort Chunjing of the First Rank, wife of Lunghi | |
| 30.11.1663 | Geng Juzhong | Geng | Princess Roujia of the Second Rank (和硕柔嘉公主, 11 June 1652 – 23 August 1673) | Father: Yolo Mother: Princess Consort Anhe of the First Rank | 1. Lady Geng, wife of Kuiju | |
| 14.10.1670 | Bandi | Khorchin Borjigin | Princess Duanmin of the First Rank (固伦端敏公主, 5 August 1653 - 14 June 1729) | Father: Jidu Mother: Princess Consort Jianchun, lady Khorchin Borjigin | 1. Lobzang Gunbu (萝卜藏衮布); 2. Tsewang Dorji (策旺多尔济) | |

=== Daughters of the Kangxi Emperor ===
==== Biological daughters ====
| Year | Prince Consort | Clan of the Prince Consort | Princess | Mother | Issue | Reference |
|---|---|---|---|---|---|---|
| 1691 | Urgun (乌尔衮) | Barin Borjigin | Princess Rongxian of the First Rank (固伦荣宪公主,1673-1728) | Consort Rong (荣妃), of the Magiya clan | 1. Linbu (琳布) | |
| November 1692 | Ga'erzang (噶尔藏) | Harqin Ulanghan clan | Princess Duanjing of the Second Rank (和硕端静公主,1674-1710) | Noble Lady Bu (布贵人), of the Joogiya clan | | |
| 1697 | Dondob Dorji (敦多布多爾濟/敦多布多尔济; d. 1743) | Khalkha Borjigin | Princess Kejing of the First Rank (固伦恪靖公主, 4 July 1679 – March/April 1735) | Noble Lady, of the Gorolo clan | 1.First daughter (died prematurely) 1.Genzapudorji (根扎普多尔济) | |
| 1700 | Shun'anyan (舜安颜, d.1724) | Tunggiya | Princess Wenxian of the First Rank (固伦温宪公主; 10 November 1683 – August/September 1702) | Empress Xiaogongren, of the Uya clan | | |
| July 1706 | Tsering (策棱/策棱; d. 1750) | Khakha Borjigin | Princess Chunque of the First Rank (固伦纯悫公主; 20 March 1685 – 22 April 1710) | Concubine Tong, Yanjimai, lady Ulanara (通嫔乌拉那拉氏檐吉迈) | 1.Subashili (苏巴什礼) | |
| August 1706 | Cangjin (苍津) | Onnigud Borjigin | Princess Wenke of the Second Rank (和硕温恪公主; 31 December 1687 – 27 July 1709) | Imperial Noble Consort Jingmin, of the Janggiya clan | 1. First daughter 2. Second daughter | |
| 1706 | Sun Chengyun (孙承云, d.1719) | Sun | Princess Quejing of the Second Rank (和硕悫靖公主; 16 January 1690 – 1736) | Noble Lady, of the Yuan clan (贵人袁氏) | 1.Sun Wufu (孙五福) | |
| January 1709 | Dorji (多尔济) | Khorchin Borjigin | Princess Dunke of the Second Rank (和硕敦恪公主; 3 February 1691 – 2 January 1710) | Imperial Noble Consort Jingmin, of the Janggiya clan | 1. Wife of Subashili | |

==== Adoptive daughters and granddaughters ====
| Year | Prince Consort | Clan | Princess | Background | Issue | Reference |
|---|---|---|---|---|---|---|
| 1690 | Bandi (班第) | Khorchin Borjigin | Princess Chunxi of the First Rank (固伦纯禧公主,28 December 1671 – 13 January 1742) | Father: Changning Mother:Mistress, lady Jin | 1.Sailengnamuzha'er (塞楞納穆扎爾/塞楞纳穆扎尔) | |
| June 1720 | Alabudan | Tumed | Princess of the Third Rank | Father: Yunreng Mother: Lady Guwalgiya | | |
| before 1740 | Abao (阿宝) | Alxa Borjigin | Princess Daokexin of the Third Rank (道恪欣郡主) | Father: Boguoduo Mother: Princess Consort Zhuangjing of the First Rank, lady Chahar Borjigit | 1. Gumubuzao; 2. Lobzang Dorji; 3. Larjiwang | |

=== Daughters of the Yongzheng Emperor ===
==== Biological daughters ====
| Year | Prince Consort | Clan | Princess | Mother | Issue | References |
|---|---|---|---|---|---|---|
| 1712 | Xingde (星德) | Nara clan | Princess Huaike of the Second Rank (和碩懷恪公主; 15 August 1695 – April/May 1717) | Consort Qi | | |

==== Adopted daughters ====
| Year | Prince Consort | Clan | Princess | Background | Issue | References |
|---|---|---|---|---|---|---|
| 1726 | Janggimboo (观音保) | Khorchin Borjigin | Princess Shushen of the Second Rank (和硕淑慎公主) | Father: Yunreng Mother: Secondary crown princess, lady Tanggiya | 1. Princess Consort Xun, wife of Yongzhang | |
| 6.12.1729 | Dorji Septeng | Khalkha Borjigin | Princess Hehui of the Second Rank (和硕和惠公主) | Father: Yinxiang, Prince Yi Mother: Princess Consort Yixian of the First Rank, lady Joogiya | 1. Jaisang Dorji (斋桑多尔济) | |
| 1731 | Chimed Dorji (齐默特多尔济) | Khorchin Borjigin | Princess Duanrou of the Second Rank (和碩端柔公主; 13 April 1714 – 23 January 1755), | Father:Yunlu Mother:Princess Consort Zhuangke of the First Rank, lady Gorolo | | |

=== Daughters of the Qianlong Emperor ===
==== Biological daughters ====
| Year | Prince Consort | Clan | Princess | Mother | Issue | References |
|---|---|---|---|---|---|---|
| 1746 | Septeng Baljur | Khorchin Borjigin | Princess Hejing of the First Rank (1731-1792) | Empress Xiaoxianchun | 1.Princess Consort of the Fourth Rank, wife of Miande: 2. NN; 3.Wife of Jikejizhabu (济克济札布) of the Aohan Borjigin clan 4.Wife of Fengshenjilun (丰神吉伦) of the Fuca clan 1.Eleke Temur Erke Babai (厄勒克特穆尔额尔克巴拜) | |
| 10.05.1760 | Fulong'an (福隆安) | Fuca clan | Princess Hejia of the Second Rank (和硕和嘉公主,24 December 1745 – 29 October 1767) | Imperial Noble Consort Chunhui | 1.Fengshenjilun (丰神吉伦) 2.Fengshenguolemin (丰神果勒敏) | |
| 1770 | Lhawang Dorji (拉旺多尔济) | Khalkha Borjigin | Princess Hejing of the First Rank | Empress Xiaoyichun | | |
| 1771 | Jalantai (扎兰泰) | Uya | Princess Heke of the Second Rank | Empress Xiaoyichun | 1.Wife of Rinchen Dorji (林沁多尔济) | |
| 12.01.1790 | Fengshenyinde | Niohuru | Gurun Princess Hexiao | Consort Dun | 1.Fu'en (弗恩) - adopted | |

==== Adopted daughters ====
| Year | Prince Consort | Clan | Princess | Background | Issue | References |
|---|---|---|---|---|---|---|
| 13.01.1751 | Deleke (德勒克, d.1794) | Barin Borjigin | Princess Hewan of the Second Rank (和碩和婉公主; 24 July 1734 – 2 May 1760) | Father: Hongzhou, Prince He Mother: Princess Consort Hegong of the First Rank, lady Ujaku | 1.Princess Consort Lu of the Second Rank, wife of Mianhui | |

=== Daughters of the Jiaqing Emperor ===
| Year | Prince Consort | Clan | Princess | Mother | Issue | References |
|---|---|---|---|---|---|---|
| 24.12.1801 | Sodnamdorji (索特納木多布濟/索特纳木多尔济; d. 1825) | Khorchin Borjigin | Princess Zhuangjing of the Second Rank (和硕庄敬公主; 30 January 1782 – 4 April 1811) | Imperial Noble Consort Heyu | 1. Sengge Rinchen (adopted) | |
| 1802 | Manibadala | Tumed Borjigin | Princess Zhuangjing of the First Rank (固伦庄静公主; 20 October 1784 – 27 June 1811) | Empress Xiaoshurui | | |

=== Daughters of the Daoguang Emperor ===
| Year | Prince Consort | Clan | Princess | Mother | Issue | References |
|---|---|---|---|---|---|---|
| 15.11.1841 | Demchugjab (德穆楚克扎布, d.1865) | Naiman Borjigin | Gurun Princess Shou'an (固伦寿安公主;12 May 1826 – 24 March 1860) | Empress Xiaoquancheng | Son: 1. Sagala (萨嘎拉) - adopted | |
| 3.01.1843 | Enchong (恩崇) | Namdulu | Princess Shouzang of the First Rank (寿臧和硕公主; 15 November 1829 – 9 August 1856) | Consort Xiang | Son: 1. Wenxi (文熙) - adopted | |
| June 1845 | Jingshou (景寿) | Fuca clan | Princess Shou'en of the First Rank (寿恩固伦公主; 20 January 1831 – 15 May 1859) | Empress Xiaojingcheng | Sons: 1. Zhiduan (志端) and three other; Daughters: 1. Princess Consort Ruijing of the First Rank, wife of Kuibin; 2. Princess Consort Zhuanggong of the First Rank, wife of Zaigong; 3. Princess Consort Zhengke of the First Rank, wife of Kaitai; 4. State Duchess of the First Rank, wife of Zaikui (Prince Chun (淳) peerage); 5. Wife of Pushuang (溥爽); 6. Wife of Wenliang (文良) | |
| 1863 | Jalafungga (扎拉丰阿) | Niohuru | Princess Shouxi of the First Rank (寿禧和硕公主; 7 January 1842 – 10 September 1866) | Noble Consort Tong | | |
| 1859 | Dehui (德徽, d. 1859) | Bolot | Princess Shouzhuang of the First Rank (壽莊固倫公主; 24 March 1844 – 11 March 1884) | Imperial Noble Consort Zhuangshun | Son: 1. Akdonga (阿克东阿) | |

=== Daughters of the Xianfeng Emperor ===
==== Biological daughters ====
| Year | Prince Consort | Clan of the Prince Consort | Princess | Mother | Issue | References |
|---|---|---|---|---|---|---|
| 1873 | Fuzhen | Gūwalgiya | Gurun Princess Rong'an | Imperial Noble Consort Zhuangjing | 1.Miscarriage | |

==== Adoptive daughters ====
| Year | Prince Consort | Clan of the Prince Consort | Princess | Background | Issue | References |
|---|---|---|---|---|---|---|
| 15 October 1866 | Zhiduan | Fuca clan | Princess Rongshou of the First Rank (榮壽固倫公主; 28 February 1854 – 1924) | Father : Yixin, Prince Gong Mother: Youlan scholar, Princess Consort Gongzhong of the First Rank | | |

== Lists of princes consorts by the imperial princes being the direct descendants of the emperors ==
The following list is created according to the imperial sons and their descendants. Please note, that not all princesses are included because of insufficient data in imperial records. The princesses adopted as emperor's daughters are not included.

=== Sons of Taksi ===
Šurhaci's daughters
| Year | Prince consort | Clan | Princess | Mother | Issue |
|---|---|---|---|---|---|
| 1603 | Bujantai | Ulanara | Eshitai | Lady Hada Nara | |
| 1603 | Bujantai | Ulanara | E'enzhe | Lady Fuca | |
| NN | Namuxi | Tunggiya | 3.NN | Lady Fuca | |
| 1608 | Gumubei | Donggo | 5.NN | Lady Donggo | |
| 1614 | Molohun | Nara clan | 6.NN | Lady Guwalgiya | |
| 1609 | Chuoheluo | Wanyan | 7.NN | Lady Guwalgiya | |
| 1616 | Badana | Nara clan | 8.NN | Lady Guwalgiya | |
| 1622 | Babai | Borjigin | 10.NN | Lady Guwalgiya | |
| 1623 | Kudena | Lala | 11.NN | Lady Ayan Gioro | |
| | Muwuna | Nara | 12.NN | Lady Ayan Gioro | |

==== Descendants of Šurhaci ====
Prince Zheng peerage
| Year | Prince Consort | Clan | Princess | Mother | Issue | References |
|---|---|---|---|---|---|---|
Jirhalang
| | Erkedaicing | Khalkha Borjigin | 1.NN | Lady Mengguosu | | |
Feiyanggu
| | Majike (马吉科) | Aohan Borjigin | 3.Lady of the Third Rank | Lady Irgen Gioro | | |
Ulgungga
| | Futai | Sakda | 1.Lady | Lady Hu | 1.Empress Xiaodexian | |
Duanhua
| | Chongqi | Arute Hala | 1.Lady | Lady Niohuru | 1.Empress Xiaozheyi | |

=== Sons of Nurhaci ===
==== Prince Guanglue of the Third Rank ====
Descendants of Cuyen, Prince Guanglue of the Third Rank
| Year | Prince Consort | Clan | Princess | Mother | Issue | References |
|---|---|---|---|---|---|---|
Cuyen
| 1614 | Fiongdon | Gūwalgiya | 1.NN | Primary consort, Lady Yehe-Nara | 10 sons and 4 daughters, including: 1. Princess Consort Hehui of the Third Rank, wife of Saisanggu (塞桑武); 2. Princess Consort Jianjingding of the First Rank, wife of Feiyanggu (费扬古); 3. Princess Consort Duyi Gangguo of the Third Rank, wife of Bayara (巴雅拉); 4. Princess Consort Quehou of the Third Rank, wife of Durhu (杜尔祜) | |
| after 1614 | Manzhuxili | Khorchin Borjigin | 2.Jinai (济鼐) | Mistress, Lady Fuca | | |
Murhu
| 1640s | Eshuo | Donggo | 1.NN | Lady Jarud Borjigit | 1. Consort Donggo; 2. Feiyanggu | |
| 1660s | Feiyanggu | Ulanara | 4.Lady of the First Rank | Lady Jarud Borjigit | 1. Xingchan (星禅); 2. Fuchang (富昌); 3. Fucun (富村); 4. Duoqimuli, Empress Xiaojingxian; 5. Wuge (五格) | |
| 1660s | Yantu | Nara clan | 7.NN | Lady Jarud Borjigit | | |

==== Prince Li of the First Rank/Prince Xun of the First Rank/Prince Kang of the First Rank ====
Prince Li peerage
| Year | Prince consort | Clan | Princess | Mother | Issue | References |
|---|---|---|---|---|---|---|
Daišan
| NN | Gang Won (hanja:姜瑗), son of Gang Hong-rip | Jinju Gang (hanja:晋州姜氏) | 1.NN | 1.Princess Consort Lilie of the First Rank, Yehenara Subenzhu | | |
Giyesu
| NN | Kuifang (揆方), son of Mingju | Yehe-Nara | 8. Princess of the Third Rank Shushen (郡主淑慎) | Second Princess Consort Kangliang of the First Rank, lady Donggo | 1.Yongshou (永寿/永绶) | |

===== Cadet lines =====
Prince Ying (穎), line of Sahaliyan
| Year | Prince Consort | Clan | Princess | Mother | Issue | References |
|---|---|---|---|---|---|---|
| 1633 | He'erben (和尔本) | Donggiya | 1.Princess of the Fourth Rank (县主, 1620–1667) | Ulanara Jihai, Primary Princess Consort Yingyi of the First Rank | | |
| 1640 | Tenggis (腾吉斯) | Sunid Borjigin | 2.Princess of the Fourth Rank (县主, 1625–1700) | Ulanara Jihai, Primary Princess Consort Yingyi of the First Rank | 1.Princess Consort Duanzhongding of the First Rank, wife of Bolo | |

Prince Keqin, line of Yoto
| Year | Prince Consort | Clan | Princess | Mother | Issue | References |
|---|---|---|---|---|---|---|
| NN | Bilaxi | Borjigin | 2.NN | Primary princess consort Keqin, lady Nara | 1.Primary consort of Nuoni | |
| NN | Tseling (塞棱) | Barin Borjigin | 3.NN | Primary princess consort Keqin, lady Nara | | |
| NN | Darhan Zhuoliketu Badun (达尔翰卓里克图巴敦) | Khorchin Borjigin | 6.NN | Second primary princess consort Keqin, lady Hada Nara | 1.Primary Princess Consort Pingbi of the Second Rank | |
Yalangga (雅朗阿)
| 1786 | Huilian (惠廉) | NN | 5.Lady of the Second Rank | Secondary Princess Consort Keqinliang of the Second Rank, lady Zhanggiya | | |

==== Prince An of the First Rank / Prince Raoyu of the First Rank ====
Prince An peerage
| Year | Prince Consort | Clan | Princess | Mother | Issue | References |
|---|---|---|---|---|---|---|
| 1618 | Li Yongfang | Li | 1.Princess of Fushun | Princess Consort Raoyumin of the First Rank | | |
| NN | Inggurdai | Tatara clan | 2.NN | Princess Consort Raoyumin of the First Rank | | |
| 1630s | Chorji | Khorchin | 7.NN | Mistress, lady Ulanghaigimot | 1. Alatan Qiqige, Empress Xiaohuizhang; 2. Consort Shuhui (1642–1713); 3. Princess Consort Jianchun of the First Rank, wife of Jidu; 4. Princess Consort of Kuluku | |
| NN | Burhatu | | 8.NN | Mistress, lady Ulanghaigimot | | |
Yolo
| 1668 | Changbao (常保) | Nara clan | 3.NN | Mistress, lady Liu | | |
| 1674 | Naihun (鼐浑) | Irgen Gioro | 6.NN | Mistress, lady Liu | | |
| 1674 | Mingshang (明尚) | Gorolo | 7.Princess of the Third Rank (1659–1684) | Secondary consort, Lady Ulahanzhemen | 1.Princess Consort Lian, wife of Yunsi (1680–1726) | |
| 1679 | Naige (奈格) | Nara clan | 11.Princess of the Third Rank | Third primary princess consort Anhe of the First Rank, lady Hešeri | | |
| 1682 | Prince of the Third Rank Erdemutu (额尔德穆图) | Ulanghan | 15.Princess of the Fourth Rank | Third primary princess consort Anhe of the First Rank, lady Hešeri | | |
| 1683 | Mucai (穆采) | Nara clan | 16.NN | Mistress, lady Zhou | | |
| 1685 | Xinahai (席纳海) | Nara clan | 19.Princess of the Fourth Rank | Third primary princess consort Anhe of the First Rank, lady Hešeri | | |
| 1698 | Shiming (侍明) | Gūwalgiya | 23. Princess of the Fourth Rank | Third primary princess consort Anhe of the First Rank, lady Hešeri | | |

==== Prince Ying of the First Rank ====
Prince Ying of the First Rank, lineage of Ajige
| Year | Prince Consort | Clan | Princess | Mother | Issue | References |
|---|---|---|---|---|---|---|
| 1650s | Mingju | Nara clan | 5.NN (1637–1694) | Second primary consort, lady Borjigin | three sons, including Nalan Xingde | |
Suyan
| 1720s | Nian Gengyao | Nian | 2.NN | Mistress, Lady Chen | 1.Nian Xi 2.Nian Bin 3.Nian Fu 1.Lady Nian | |

==== Prince Yu of the First Rank ====
Prince Yu, line of Dodo
| Year | Prince Consort | Clan | Princess | Mother | Issue |
|---|---|---|---|---|---|
| 1645 | Zhemen (辙门) | Barin | 1.NN | Primary Princess Consort Yutong, lady Khorchin Borjigin | |
| 1646 | Huashan (华善) | Shi (Gūwalgiya) | 3.Princess of the Third Rank | Primary Princess Consort Yutong, lady Khorchin Borjigin | 1.Shi Wenbing (文炳) |
| 1663 | Eqir | Khorchin Borjigin | 8.Princess of the Fourth Rank | Secondary princess consort Yutong, lady Tunggiya | |

=== Sons of Hong Taiji ===
==== Prince Su ====
Prince Su peerage
| Year | Prince consort | Clan | Princess | Mother | Issue | References |
|---|---|---|---|---|---|---|
| Hooge, Prince Su | | | | | | |
| NN | Geng Jingzhong | Geng | 1.Princess of the First Rank | Primary Princess Consort Suwu, Duleima | Geng Xianzuo (耿显祚) | |
| Yongxi (永锡) | | | | | | |
| NN | Hualiang'a | Khorchin Borjigin | 1.Lady | Princess Consort Sugong of the First Rank, lady Namdulu | 1.Empress Xiaojingcheng | |
| NN | Guiliang | Gūwalgiya | 2.Princess of the Fourth Rank | Secondary Princess Consort Sugong of the First Rank | 1.Princess Consort Gongzhong of the First Rank, wife of Yixin 2.Second Princess Consort Huiduan of the First Rank, wife of Mianyu | |
Longqin (隆懃)
| 1898 | Gungsangnorbu | Ulanghai | 1.Shankun (善坤) | Secondary Princess Consort Suliang | Sons: 1. Du'erbo (笃尔博); 2. Duyao (杜耀); Daughters: 1. Wu Xiaowen (乌孝闻); 2. Wu Jingbin | |
Shanqi
| 1927 | Ganjuurjab | Tumed | 14.Yoshiko Kawashima | Secondary Princess Consort Suzhong, lady Zhangjia | | |
| 1954 | Ma Wanli | Ma | 17.Jin Moyu | Secondary Princess Consort Suzhong, lady Zhangjia | | |
| 1973 | Shi Youwei | Shi | 17.Jin Moyu | Secondary Princess Consort Suzhong, lady Zhangjia | | |
Xianzhang (宪章)
| 1940 | Yong'en | Xue | Lianlu (廉铝) | Secondary Princess Consort Su of the First Rank, Lady Tang | 4 sons and 3 daughters | |

==== Descendants of Yebushu ====
Descendants of Yebushu, Grace Bulwark Duke
| Year | Prince Consort | Clan | Princess | Mother | Issue | Reference |
|---|---|---|---|---|---|---|
| 1667 | Huanghai (黄海) | Gūwalgiya | 1.NN | Primary consort, Lady Tubusu | | |

==== Prince Zhuang ====
Prince Zhuang peerage
| Year | Prince Consort | Clan | Princess | Mother |
|---|---|---|---|---|
Boguoduo
| | Namuzha | Barin | 1.NN | Lady Shi |
Yunlu
| 1743 | Laxinamzh'er | Khorchin Borjigin | 4.Princess of the Third Rank | Lady Gorolo |
| 1742 | Exin | Sirin Gioro | 5.Lady of the third rank | Lady Wang |
| 1739 | Tsewang Norbu | Khorchin Borjigin | 6.Princess of the fourth rank | Lady Xue |
| 1750 | Lobzang Dorji (羅蔔藏多爾濟) | | 8.Princess of the fourth rank | Secondary consort, lady Wang |
| 1752 | Yuanlao | Tunggiya | 9. Princess of the fourth rank | Secondary consort, lady Wang |
Hongrong
| 18th century | Delin (德麟) | Fuca | 1.NN | Mistress, lady Sun |
Mianke (绵课)
| 1816 | Wangqin Dorji (旺沁多尔济) | Borjigin | 5.NN | Mistress, lady Li |
Yiren (奕仁)
| 1879 | Ayurjana (阿玉尔扎纳) | Uliyahan (乌里雅罕) | 2.Lady of the First Rank | Secondary consort, lady Wanyan |

=== Sons of the Shunzhi Emperor ===
Prince Yu of the First Rank, line of Fuquan
| Year | Prince Consort | Clan | Princess | Mother | Issue | References |
|---|---|---|---|---|---|---|
Fuquan, Prince Yu
| 1713 | Lobzang Gunbu (萝卜藏衮布, d.1752) | Khorchin Borjigin | 5.Princess of the Third Rank | Mistress, lady Nara | 1.Septeng Baljur | |
| 1716 | Cangjin (苍津) | Onnigud Borjigin | 6.Princess of the Third Rank | Mistress, lady Nara | | |
| Lianghuan (亮焕) | | | | | | |
| 1802 | Jilemote (吉勒莫特, d.1802) | Borjigin | 3.Princess of the Third Rank | Primary princess consort Yuxi of the Second Rank, lady Guwalgiya | | |
Xiangduan (祥端)
| 1844 | Prince of the Second Rank Seboke Dorji (色伯克多尔济) | Kharchin | 1.NN | Princess consort of the Fourth Rank, lady Biru | | |

Prince Gong, line of Changning
| Year | Prince Consort | Clan | Mother | Issue |
|---|---|---|---|---|
| 1688 | Du'erma (杜尔马) | Gūwalgiya | Mistress, lady Chen | |
| 1698 | Du'erma (杜尔马) | Gūwalgiya | Mistress, lady Niohuru | |
Linggui (灵桂)
| NN | Ronglu | Gūwalgiya | Lady Sun | 1.Youlan 2.Princess Consort Lidun of the First Rank, wife of Chenghou |
Songsen (松森/嵩森)
| NN | Baochu (保初) | Arute | Lady Bayute | 1.Lianding 2.Lianrong 3.Lianmi 4.Lianhong |

=== Sons of the Kangxi Emperor ===
==== Prince Zhi of the Second Rank ====
Prince Zhi of the Second Rank peerage
| Year | Prince consort | Clan | Princess | Mother | References |
|---|---|---|---|---|---|
Yunzhi, Prince Zhi
| 1706 | Dorji Tsereng (多尔济色棱) | Khorchin | 1.Princess of the Third Rank | Princess Consort Zhi of the Second Rank, lady Irgen Gioro | |
| 1707 | Shu'ao (淑鳌) | Li | 2.Princess of the Third Rank | Princess Consort Zhi of the Second Rank, lady Irgen Gioro | |
| 1714 | Labutan (拉布坦) | Kakai (喀凯) | 3.Lady of the Second Rank | Princess Consort Zhi of the Second Rank, lady Irgen Gioro | |
| 1710 | Cheng'en (承恩) | Sun | 4. Lady of the Second Rank | Princess Consort Zhi of the Second Rank, lady Irgen Gioro | |
| 1723 | Seleng Namuzhar (塞楞纳穆扎尔) | Khorchin | 5.Lady of the Second Rank | Mistress, lady Uya | |
| 1734 | Laxi (拉锡) | Aohan Borjigin | 7.Lady of the Second Rank | Mistress, lady Chao (晁) | |
| 1733 | Lobzang Dondob (萝卜藏敦多布) | Khorchin Borjigin | 8.Lady of the Second Rank | Second Princess Consort Zhi of the Second Rank, lady Zhang | |
| 1734 | Jirdi (吉尔第) | Khorchin Borjigin | 9.Lady of the Second Rank | Mistress, lady Guo | |
| 1733 | Wangjar (汪扎尔) | Aohan Borjigin | 10.Lady of the Second Rank | Mistress, lady Guo | |
| 1746 | Jilalida (吉喇里达) | Khorchin Borjigin | 14. Lady of the Second Rank | Mistress, lady Guo | |
Hongfang
| 1795 | Toktanihu (托克塔尼虎) | NN | 8.Lady of the Third Rank | Primary consort, lady Huihe | |

==== Prince Li of the First Rank, line of Yunreng ====
Prince Li
| Year | Prince Consort | Clan | Princess | Mother | Issue |
|---|---|---|---|---|---|
| 1720 | Alabutan | Tumed | 3.Princess of the Third Rank | Crown Princess, Lady Guwalgiya | |
| 1731 | Pengsukelashi | Aohan Borjigin | 8.Princess of the Third Rank | Secondary crown princess, lady Cenggiya | |
| 1730 | Tsewang Dorji | Aohan | 9.Princess of the Fourth Rank | Secondary crown princess, lady Lingiya | |
| 1732 | Kaying'a | Harchin | 12.Princess of the Third Rank | Mistress, lady Qi | |
Hongxi
| 1728 | Tsewangjab | Gorlosi (郭尔罗斯) | 1.Lady of the Second Rank | Mistress, lady Qiang | |
| 1732 | Dondob | Naiman Borjigin | 2.NN | Mistress, lady Zhang | |
Hongwei (弘㬙)
| 1760 | Shajina'erbitehu (沙进阿) | NN | 3.Princess of the Third Rank | Secondary princess consort Like, lady Chen | |
Yong'ai (永暧)
| before 1797 | Bazaladi (巴咱拉迪) | Borjigin | 1.NN | Mistress, lady Wang | |
Zaiyao (载耀)
| 19th century | Chongqi | Arute Hala | 1.NN | Primary consort, lady Nara | |

==== Prince Cheng of the Second Rank ====
Prince Cheng of the Second Rank, line of Yinzhi
| Year | Prince Consort | Clan | Princess | Mother | Issue | References |
|---|---|---|---|---|---|---|
| 1717 | Genzhapu Dorji (根扎普多尔济) | Khalkha Borjigin | 2.Princess of the Third Rank | Princess Consort Chengyin of the Second Rank, lady Donggo | | |
| 1720 | Idamjab (伊达穆扎普) | Khorchin Gulusipu (固鲁斯普) | 3.Princess of the Third Rank | Mistress, lady Irgen Gioro | | |
| Hongjing (弘暻) | | | | | | |
| 1750 | Fuqing (傅清) | Fuca clan | 1.Lady of the Second Rank | Princess consort of the fourth rank, lady Irgen Gioro | 1.Mingren (明仁) 2.Mingyi (明义) Daughters: wife of Shengchang(盛昌), wife of Zonghuang (宗潢), wife of Chengben (成本) | |
| NN | Chuijijale (垂济扎勒) | Aohan Borjigin | 3.NN | | | |
| NN | Seleng Dorji (塞楞多尔济) | Khorchin Borjigin | 5.NN | | | |
| Zailing (载龄) | | | | | | |
| 19th century | Changxu (长叙) | Tatara clan | 1.NN | Lady Khorchin Borjigin | one daughter | |

==== Prince Heng of the First Rank ====
Prince Heng
| Year | Prince Consort | Clan | Princess | Mother | Issue |
|---|---|---|---|---|---|
Yunqi
| 1713 | Namusai | Khalkha Ulangagimot | 1.Princess of the Third Rank | Secondary princess consort, lady Liu | |
| 1719 | Tserengwangbu | Oirat Chuoluosi | 2.Princess of the Third Rank | Mistress, lady Ma, daughter of Baiyu | |
| 1721 | Dachong'a | Sakda | 3.Lady of the Second Rank | Mistress, lady Ma, daughter of Santai | |
| 1735 | Junxibandi | Khorchin Borjigin | 4.Lady of the Second Rank | Mistress, lady Ma, daughter of Santai | |
| 1738 | Sumadi | Dun'erlosi Borjigin | 6.NN | Mistress, lady Zhang | |
Yongxiong
| 1778 | Erje Temur Erke Babai | Khorchin Borjigin | 1.Lady of the Second Rank | Primary wife, lady Namdulu | |

==== Prince Chun, line of Yunyou ====
| Year | Prince Consort | Clan | Princess | Mother | Issue | References |
|---|---|---|---|---|---|---|
| 1713 | Tuizhong | Naiman Borjigin | 1.Princess of the Third Rank | Secondary Princess Consort, lady Nara | | |
| 1717 | Dorji Lashi (多尔济拉氏) | Aohandu | 2.Princess of the Third Rank | Secondary Princess Consort, lady Nara | | |
| 1718 | Baojin (保进) | Wendu (温度) | 5.Princess of the Third Rank | Primary princess consort Chundu, lady Hada Nara | | |
| 1731 | Septeng Dorji | Khorchin Borjigin | 7.Princess of the Third Rank | Mistress, lady Li | | |
| 1741 | Huturingga | Kharchin Ulanghaijimot | 8.Princess of the Fourth Rank | Mistress, lady Fuca | | |
Hongjing, Prince Chunshen of the Second Rank
| 1742 | Jizhar (季札尔) | NN | 1.Lady of the Second Rank | Mistress | | |

==== Prince Lian of the First Rank ====
Prince Lian of the First Rank
| Year | Prince Consort | Clan | Princess | Mother | Issue | Reference |
|---|---|---|---|---|---|---|
| 1724 | Wufu | Sun | 1.Princess of the First Rank | Lady Mao | | |

==== Line of Yuntang ====
Descendants of Yuntang
| Year | Prince Consort | Clan | Princess | Mother | Issue | Reference |
|---|---|---|---|---|---|---|
| 1718 | Septeng Wangbu | Oirat Cholosi | 1.NN | Lady Wanyan | | |
| 1719 | Kanbu | Barin Borjigin | 2.NN | Lady Joogiya | | |
| 1720 | Yongfu | Yehenara | 3.NN | Lady Wanyan | | |
| 1721 | Shiyang | Zhao | 4.NN | Primary consort, lady Donggo | | |
| 1739 | Septeng | NN | 5.NN | Lady Joogiya | | |

==== Prince Dun of the Second Rank ====
Prince Dun of the Second Rank, line of Yun'e
| Year | Prince Consort | Clan | Princess | Mother | Issue | References |
|---|---|---|---|---|---|---|
| 1734 | Lalida | Khorchin Tolui | 1.NN | Lady Gorolo | | |

==== Prince Lü of the First Rank ====
Prince Lü, line of Yuntao
| Year | Prince Consort | Clan | Princess | Mother | Issue | References |
|---|---|---|---|---|---|---|
| 1721 | Da'ermadadou | Khorchin Borjigin | 1.Princess of the Third Rank | Mistress, of the Ligiya clan | | |
| 1753 | Mingliang | Fuca clan | 3.Princess of the Third Rank | Secondary princess consort Lüyi, lady Fanggiya | | |
| 1756 | Gunqilaxi | Borjigin | 7.Lady of the Third Rank | Mistress, of the Wanggiya clan | | |
Yongcheng
| 1785 | Wangqin Bambar | Alxa Borjigin | 2.Princess of the Fourth Rank | Secondary princess consort Lüduan, lady Wanyan | | |
| 1791 | Namqijal Dorji | Aohan | 3.Princess of the Fourth Rank | Secondary princess consort Lüduan, lady Wanyan | | |
Yilun
| 1829 | Elehun (鄂勒浑) | NN | 3.Lady of the First Rank | Second primary consort, lady Irgen Gioro | | |

==== Prince Yi of the First Rank ====
Prince Yi, line of Yinxiang
| Year | Prince Consort | Clan | Princess | Mother | Issue | References |
|---|---|---|---|---|---|---|
| 1721 | Sakexin | Jinjili | 1.Princess of the Third Rank | Secondary princess consort Yixian, lady Guwalgiya | | |
| 1723 | Fusengge | Irgen Gioro | 2.Princess of the Third Rank | Primary Princess Consort Yixian, lady Joogiya | 1.Princess Consort Lüduan of the First Rank | |
Hongxiao, Prince Yi
| NN | Jiminzhu'er Dorji (济敏珠尔多尔济) | Khorchin Borjigin | 1.NN | | | |
| 1768 | Manduhu | Onnigud Borjigin | 4.NN | | | |
| 1779 | Mubaledan (穆巴勒丹) | Kharchin | 9. Princess of the Third Rank | Second Primary Princess Consort Yixi, lady Tunggiya | | |
Yonglang
| NN | Duanyaote Dorji (端耀特多尔济) | Kharchin | 1.NN | Mistress, lady Liu | | |
| NN | Zhaxiteku (扎西特库) | Kharchin | 6.NN | Primary Princess Consort Yigong, lady Guwalgiya | | |
Zaiyuan
| 1852 | Boyanamohu | Khorchin Borjigin | 1.Princess of the Third Rank | Primary princess consort Yi, lady Nara | | |
| 1863 | Darma | Borjigin | 3.NN | Primary princess consort Yi, lady Nara | | |
| 1867 | Xilingga | Ulanghai | 4.NN | Secondary Princess consort Yi, lady Fanggiya | | |
| 1874 | Nolasang Wangbu | Ulanghai | 6.NN | Secondary Princess consort Yi, lady Fanggiya | | |
Zaidun
| 1856 | Wenxi | Namdulu | 4.NN | Primary princess consort Yi, lady Tatara | | |

==== Prince Xun of the Second Rank ====
Prince Xun of the Second Rank, line of Yunti
| Year | Prince consort | Clan | Princess | Mother | Issue | References |
|---|---|---|---|---|---|---|
| 10.02.1719 | Chenggunzhab (成衮扎布) | Harqin | 2.Princess of the Third Rank | Secondary princess consort Xunqin, lady Šušu Gioro | | |
| 1719 | Senggunzhab | NN | 2.Princess of the Third Rank | Secondary princess consort Xunqin, lady Šušu Gioro | | |
| 1728 | Halu (哈禄) | Namdulu | 3.Lady of the Second Rank | Secondary princess consort Xunqin, lady Šušu Gioro | | |
| 1730 | Deshou (德受) | Aohan Borjigin | 4. Princess of the Fourth Rank | Secondary princess consort Xunqin, lady Irgen Gioro | | |
| 1728 | Septeng Wangbu | Oirat | 5.Princess of the Third Rank | Secondary princess consort Xunqin, lady Šušu Gioro | | |
| 1767 | Erdengge (额尔等额) | Niohuru | 7.Princess of the Fourth Rank | mistress, lady Irgen Gioro | | |

==== Prince Yu of the Second Rank ====
Prince Yu of the Second Rank, line of Yunxu
| Year | Prince consort | Clan | Princess | Mother | Issue | References |
|---|---|---|---|---|---|---|
| 1742 | Dondob Dorji | Dinghao Borjigin | 4.Lady of the Second Rank | Secondary princess consort Yuke, lady Gūwalgiya | | |
Hongqing (弘庆)
| 1746 | Fulinggan (富灵安) | Fuca clan | 1.NN | Primary princess consort Yugong, lady Nara | | |
| 1758 | Jingliang (景良) | Gūwalgiya | 3.Princess of the Fourth Rank | Primary princess consort Yugong, lady Nara | | |
| NN | Jalawa (扎拉瓦) | Aohan Borjigin | 4.Lady of the Second Rank | Secondary princess consort Yugong, lady Wang | | |
Mianxiu
| 1880 | Alabuli (阿拉布哩) | Borjigin | 2.NN | Mistress, lady Tian | | |
| 1880 | Salabuqi Abuli (萨拉布契阿布里) | Alxa Borjigin | 4.Lady of the Second Rank | Princess consort of the Fourth Rank, lady Qiujia (邱佳氏) | | |

==== Prince Jianjing of the Third Rank ====
Prince Jianjing of the Third Rank, line of Yunyi
| Year | Prince consort | Clan | Princess | Mother | Issue | References |
|---|---|---|---|---|---|---|
| 1743 | Lobzangxilap (萝卜藏锡拉普) | Aohan Borjigin | 1.Lady of the Third Rank (1727–1795) | Secondary consort, lady Cui | | |

==== Prince Zhi of the First Rank ====
Prince Shen of the Second Rank/Prince Zhi of the First Rank, line of Yunxi
| Year | Prince consort | Clan | Princess | Mother | Issue | References |
|---|---|---|---|---|---|---|
| 1743 | Gumu (古穆) | Khorchin Borjigin | 2.Princess of the Second Rank | Secondary princess consort Shenjing, lady Guwalgiya | | |
| 1744 | Jaisang Dorji (寨桑多尔济) | Khalkha Borjigin | 3.Princess of the Second Rank | Primary princess consort Shenjing, lady Zu | | |
Yongrong (永瑢)
| 1793 | Deqin | Aohan | 5.Princess of the Fourth Rank | Second Primary princess consort Zhizhuang, lady Niohuru | | |
Mianqing
| 1819 | Salashen | | 1.Princess of the Fourth Rank | | | |

==== Prince Gongqin of the Third Rank ====
Prince Gongqin of the Third Rank, line of Yunhu
| Year | Prince consort | Clan | Princess | Mother | Issue | References |
|---|---|---|---|---|---|---|
| 1745 | Mabao | Magiya | 1.Princess of the Fourth Rank | Primary consort, lady Irgen Gioro | | |
| | Jalafungga | Ulanghan | 2.Princess of the Fourth Rank | Primary consort, lady Irgen Gioro | | |
| | Gengdouzha'er (庚都扎尔) | Aohan Borjigin | 3.NN | Mistress, lady Yang | | |
| 1748 | Tsereng Damba (色楞丹巴) | Khorchin Borjigin | 4.NN | | | |

==== Prince Cheng of the Third Rank ====
Prince Cheng of the Third Rank, line of Yunqi
| Year | Prince consort | Clan | Princess | Mother | References |
|---|---|---|---|---|---|
| 1756 | Hada (哈达) | NN | 2.Lady of the Third Rank | Lady Xiang | |
| 1758 | Suyuan (素原) | Šumuru | 3.Lady of the Third Rank | Lady Xiang | |
| 1763 | Serda Tsewang (色尔达色旺) | Aohan | 5.NN | Lady Jiang (江氏) | |
| 1768 | Kumeng (枯蒙) | Hešeri | 6.NN | Lady Zhang (张氏) | |
| 1775 | Wenjun (文钧) | Huang (黄) | 8.NN | Lady Ma | |

==== Prince Xian of the First Rank ====
Prince Xian, line of Yunbi
| Year | Prince consort | Clan | Princess | Mother | References |
|---|---|---|---|---|---|
| 1750 | Mazhate Dorji (马札特多尔济) | Aohan | 2.Princess of the Third Rank | Primary princess consort Xianke, lady Uya | |
| 1756 | Banjur (班珠尔) | Borjigin | 4.Lady of the First Rank | Primary princess consort Xianke, lady Uya | |
| 1760 | Tetongte'e (特通特额) | Magiya | 6.Princess of the Third Rank | Primary princess consort Xianke, lady Uya | |
| 1759 | Naxuntegusi (纳逊特古斯) | NN | 7.Princess of the Third Rank | Primary princess consort Xianke, lady Uya | |
Hongchang (弘畅)
| 17.. | Chuiba'erwa'er (吹巴尔瓦尔) | Kharchin | 3.NN | | |
| 17.. | Zhamuyang Dobdon (扎穆扬多普丹) | NN | 4.NN | | |
| 17.. | Dalanbala (达兰巴拉) | Aohan | 8.NN | | |
Yongzhu (永珠)
| NN | Seboke Dorji (色伯克多尔济) | Kharchin | 1.Lady of the Third Rank | Secondary princess consort, lady Fan | |
| NN | Mahabizaya (玛哈必咱雅) | Aohan Borjigin | 2.Lady of the Third Rank | Secondary princess consort, lady Wu | |
Mianxun (绵勋)
| 1873 | Shaoying | Magiya | 3.NN | Second primary princess consort, lady Guwalgiya | |

=== Sons of the Qianlong Emperor ===
==== Prince Ding of the First Rank ====
Prince Ding, line of Yonghuang
| Year | Prince consort | Clan | Princess | Mother | Issue | References |
|---|---|---|---|---|---|---|
Mian'en
| 1785 | Manzhu Bazir (满珠巴子尔) | Kharchin | 1.Princess of the Third Rank | Primary princess consort Dinggong, lady Fuca | | |
Yichun
| 1804 | Qinglin (青林) | NN | 1.Lady of the Second Rank | Primary princess consort of the fourth rank, lady Irgen Gioro | | |
Zaixi
| | Deleke Dorji (德勒克多尔济) | Khakha Borjigin | 1.NN | Primary princess consort, lady Sun | | |
Yulang
| | Lixian (立先) | Wanyan | 1.Henghui (恒慧) | Primary princess consort Minda of the Third Rank, lady Hešeri | 1.Wanyan Mintong (敏彤) 2.Wanyan Bilin (碧琳) | |
| | Rongyuan | Gobulo | 2.Hengxiang (恒香) | Primary princess consort Minda of the Third Rank, lady Hešeri | 2.Gobulo Runqi (润麒) | |
Yuchang
| 1891 | Yinzhalapu (音扎拉普) | Harchin | 2.NN | | | |
| 1893 | Kunbuzhab | Tumed Borjigin | 4.Hengxin (恒馨) | Primary consort, lady Borjigit | | |
| | Rongyuan | Gobulo | 4.Hengxin (恒馨) | Primary consort, lady Borjigit | 1.Wanrong, Empress Xiaokemin: 2. Gobulo Runliang (润良) | |
| 1906 | Lhawang Balejid (拉旺巴勒吉德) | Jarud Borjigin | 5.NN | | | |
| 1905 | Qichengwu (起成武) | Borjigin | 6.NN | | | |

==== Prince Xun of the Second Rank ====
Prince Xun of the Second Rank, line of Yongzhang
| Year | Prince consort | Clan | Princess | Mother | Issue | References |
|---|---|---|---|---|---|---|
| 1770 | Danba Dorji (丹巴多尔济) | Harchin Ulanghaijiryingte (乌朗海吉尔英特氏) | Lady of the Second Rank (县君; 1755–1777) | Secondary princess consort Xun, lady Guwalgiya | | |

==== Prince Rong of the First Rank ====
Prince Rong, line of Yongqi
| Year | Prince consort | Clan | Princess | Mother | Issue | References |
|---|---|---|---|---|---|---|
| 1780 | Wangqin Bambar | Alxa Borjigin | 1.Lady of the Second Rank | Mistress Ru, lady Hu | | |
Yihui
| | Chedeng Bazir (车登巴自尔) | Khalkha Borjigin | 1.Lady of the First Rank, courtesy name Mengwen (孟文) | Gu Taiqing | 1.Princess consort of the fourth rank, wife of Zaihuan (Prince Yi (儀) peerage) | |
| | Bochang (博昌) | Fuca | 2.NN, courtesy name Zhongwen (仲文) | Gu Taiqing | | |
| | Chongduan (崇端) | Hitara | 3.Zaitong (载通) | Gu Taiqing | | |

==== Prince Yi of the First Rank ====
Prince Yi of the First Rank, line of Yongxuan
| Year | Prince consort | Clan | Princess | Mother | References |
|---|---|---|---|---|---|
| 1785 | Gongsaishang'a | Barin Borjigin | 1.Lady of the Second Rank | Wang Yuying | |

==== Prince Cheng of the First Rank ====
Prince Cheng of the First Rank, line of Yongxing
| Year | Prince consort | Clan | Princess | Mother | References |
|---|---|---|---|---|---|
| 1786 | Dewei (德威) | Aohan Borjigin | 2.Princess of the Fourth Rank | Secondary princess consort Chengzhe, Liugiya Duanyun | |
| 1795 | Bozhechentian (伯哲臣忝) | Nara | 4.Princess of the Fourth Rank | Secondary princess consort Chengzhe, Liugiya Duanyun | |
| | Linaxi | Khorchin | 6. Lady of the Second Rank | Mistress, lady Yi | |
Mianqin
| 1823 | Lianzhi | NN | 9.Princess Zhenjie of the Fourth Rank Sula (贞节县主苏拉) | Primary princess consort Cheng, lady Wumi | |
Zairui
| 1864 | Eqin'er (鄂沁尔) | Kharchin Ulinga | 7.Princess of the Fourth Rank | Primary princess consort Chenggong of the second rank, lady Eji (鄂济氏) | |

==== Prince Qing of the First Rank ====
Prince Qing, line of Yonglin
| Year | Prince consort | Clan | Princess | Mother | Issue | References |
|---|---|---|---|---|---|---|
| 1805/1806 | Jalawa Dorji (扎拉瓦多尔济) | Tumed Borjigin | 1.Lady of the Second Rank | Mistress, lady Zhangjia (张佳氏) | | |
| 1835/1836 | Sanzhaxili (三扎喜里) | Kharchin Ulanghaijilmot (乌亮海吉勒莫特) | 7.NN | Mistress, lady Zhao | | |
Yikuang
| 1885 | Nayantu (纳彦图) | Khalkha Borjigin | 1.Princess of the Third Rank | Primary princess consort Qingmi, lady Bolod | | |
| 1898 | Shiliang (世梁) | Wumit (伍弥特) | 2.Lady of the First Rank | Secondary princess consort Qingmi, lady Hegiya | | |
| 1896 | Deheng (德恒) | Yehe-Nara | 3.NN | Secondary princess consort Qingmi, lady Jingiya | | |
| 1900 | Xijun (熙俊) | Hitara | 4.Madam Xijiu (熙九太太) | Secondary princess consort Qingmi, lady Hegiya | | |
| 1906 | Liangkui (良葵) | Gūwalgiya | 6.Lady of the Second Rank | Secondary princess consort Qingmi, lady Jingiya | | |
| 1911 | Shijie (世杰) | Magiya | 8.NN | Secondary princess consort Qingmi, lady Ligiya | 1. Ma Yantong (马延通) | |
| 1921 | Hanluozhabu (汉罗扎布) | Kharchin Ulanghaijilmot (乌亮海吉勒莫特) | 11.Zaikui (载揆) | Secondary princess consort Qingmi, lady Ligiya | | |

=== Sons of the Jiaqing Emperor ===
Prince Dun of the First Rank, line of Miankai
| Year | Prince consort | Clan | Princess | Mother | References |
|---|---|---|---|---|---|
Pucheng
| | Chen Yingsan (陈英三) | Chen | 1.Yu Juying (毓菊英) | Fuca Jinggui (敬贵) | |

==== Prince Rui of the First Rank ====
Prince Rui of the First Rank, line of Mianxin
| Year | Prince consort | Clan | Princess | Mother | References |
|---|---|---|---|---|---|
Yizhi
| 1863 | Liankui (联奎) | Bolod | 2.NN | Mistress, lady Zhang | |
| 1869 | Xixian (希贤) | NN | 4.Princess of the Fourth Rank Zairong (县主载容) | Primary princess consort Ruimin of the second rank, lady Feimo | |
| 1868 | | | 5.Lady of the Second Rank | Mistress, lady Zhang | |
| 1872 | Narsu (那尔苏) | Khorchin Borjigin | 7.NN | Mistress, lady Zhang | |
Zaixun
| | Fengming (凤鸣) | Bai | 3.Jin Ruichan (金蕊蝉) | Primary consort, lady Biru | |

==== Prince Hui of the First Rank ====
Prince Hui of the first rank, line of Mianyu
| Year | Prince Consort | Clan | Princess | Mother | Issue | References |
|---|---|---|---|---|---|---|
| 19th century | Changxu (长叙) | Tatara clan | 1.NN | | | |
| 1861 | Wangdutenamujile (旺都特纳木济勒) | Kharchin | 3.Princess of the First Rank | Second Primary Princess Consort Huiduan, lady Guwalgiya | | |

=== Sons of the Daoguang Emperor ===
==== Prince Chun of the First Rank ====
Prince Chun, line of Yixuan
| Year | Prince consort | Clan | Princess | Mother | Issue | References |
|---|---|---|---|---|---|---|
| 1905 | Songchun (松春) | Fuca clan | 3.Lady of the First Rank | Third secondary princess consort Chunxian, Ligiya Daniu | | |
Zaifeng
| 1920 | Runliang (润良) | Gobulo | 1.Yunying (韫瑛) | Primary princess consort Chun, Youlan | | |
| | Guangyuan (广源) | Zheng (郑) | 2.Yunhe (韫和) | Primary princess consort Chun, Youlan | 1 son and 3 daughters | |
| 1931 | Runqi (润麒) | Gobulo | 3.Jin Yunying | Primary princess consort Chun, Youlan | 2 sons, 1 daughter | |
| | Qifan (琪番) | Harqin Zhao (赵) | 4.Yunxian (韫娴) | Secondary princess consort Chun, lady Denggiya | 1 son, 1 daughter | |
| | Jiaxi (嘉熙) | Wan (万) | 5.Yunxin (韫馨) | Secondary princess consort Chun, lady Denggiya | 3 sons, 1 daughter | |
| 1943 | Ailan (爱兰) | Wanyan | 6.Yunyu (韫娱) | Secondary princess consort Chun, lady Denggiya | 1 son, 4 daughters | |
| 12.02.1950 | Qiao Hongzhi (乔宏志) | Qiao (乔) | 7.Yunhuan (韫欢) | Secondary princess consort Chun, lady Denggiya | 2 sons, 1 daughter | |

==== Prince Zhong of the Second Rank ====
Prince Zhong, line of Yihe
| Year | Prince consort | Clan | Princess | Mother | Issue | References |
|---|---|---|---|---|---|---|
Zaitao
| 1925 | Darijaya | Alxa Borjigin | 2.Yunhui (韫慧) | Primary princess consort of the third rank, Jiang Wanzhen (姜婉贞) | 1 son, 6 daughters | |

==== Prince Fu of the Second Rank ====
Prince Fu, line of Yihui
| Year | Prince consort | Clan | Princess | Mother | References |
|---|---|---|---|---|---|
Zaishu (载澍)
| 1911 | Tsewang Duanlub (色旺端鲁布) | Aohan Borjigin | 2.NN | Princess consort of the Third Rank, lady Yehenara | |

== See also ==
- Royal and noble ranks of the Qing dynasty
