= List of Manchu clans =

This is an alphabetical list of Manchu clans:

== History ==
When the Jurchens were reorganized by Nurhaci into the Eight Banners, many Manchu clans were artificially created as a group of unrelated people founded a new Manchu clan (mukun) using a geographic origin name such as a toponym for their hala (clan name).

=== Extinct Manchu clans ===
The Qing dynasty completely annihilated the Manchu clan Hoifan (Hoifa) in 1697 and the Manchu tribe Ula in 1703 after they revolted against the Qing.

=== Han Chinese origin Manchu clans ===
Select groups of Han Chinese bannermen were mass transferred into Manchu Banners by the Qing, changing their ethnicity from Han Chinese to Manchu. Han Chinese bannermen of Tai Nikan (watchpost Han) and Fusi Nikan (Fushun Han) backgrounds into the Manchu banners in 1740 by order of the Qing Qianlong emperor. It was between 1618 and 1629 when the Han Chinese from Liaodong who later became the Fusi Nikan and Tai Nikan defected to the Jurchens (Manchus). These Han Chinese origin Manchu clans continue to use their original Han surnames and are marked as of Han origin on Qing lists of Manchu clans.

Han Chinese transfrontiersmen and other non-Jurchen origin people who joined the Later Jin very early were put into the Manchu Banners and were known as "Baisin" in Manchu, and not put into the Han Banners to which later Han Chinese were placed in. An example was the Tohoro Manchu clan in the Manchu banners which claimed to be descended from a Han Chinese with the surname of Tao who had moved north from Zhejiang to Liaodong and joined the Jurchens before the Qing in the Ming Wanli emperor's era. The Han Chinese Banner Tong 佟 clan of Fushun in Liaoning falsely claimed to be related to the Jurchen Manchu Tunggiya 佟佳 clan of Jilin, using this false claim to get themselves transferred to a Manchu banner in the reign of the Kangxi emperor.

== A ==
- Aangang Hala (昂刚氏)
- Acigecalr Hala (阿其格查依尔氏)
- Aha Gioro Hala (阿哈觉罗氏)
- Aihui Hala (爱珲氏)
- Aisin Gioro Hala (爱新觉罗氏)
- Aiyi Hala (爱义氏)
- Aiyos Hala (艾耀施氏)
- Akjan Hala (阿克占氏)
- Ala Hala (阿喇氏)
- Alai Hala (阿赉氏)
- Alar Hala (阿拉尔氏)
- Albaki Hala (阿勒巴齐氏)
- Altanemok Hala (阿勒坦鄂谟克氏)
- Alte Hala (阿勒特氏)
- Amuharnu Hala (阿穆哈尔努氏)
- Amunibutas Hala (阿穆尼布塔斯氏)
- Amuru Hala (阿穆噜氏)
- Andara Hala (安达拉氏)
- Angiya Hala (安佳氏)
- Aogiya Hala (敖佳氏)
- Aora Hala (敖拉氏)
- Aoratosin Hala (敖拉托欣氏)
- Arabiancian Hala (阿拉边前氏)
- Arakcou Hala (阿喇克球氏)
- Arakta Hala (阿拉克塔氏)
- Arbentcang Hala (阿尔本昌氏)
- Arbu Hala (阿尔布氏)
- Ardan Hala (阿尔丹氏)
- Argi Hala (阿尔吉氏)
- Ariha Hala (阿礼哈氏)
- Arla Hala (阿尔拉氏)
- Artas Hala (阿尔塔斯氏)
- Aru Hala (阿噜氏)
- Arurote Hala (阿噜罗特氏)
- Arute Hala (阿鲁特氏)
- Asuke Hala (阿苏克氏)
- Asute Hala (阿苏特氏)
- Atamu Hala (阿塔穆氏)
- Aturamo Hala (阿图拉墨氏)
- Ayan Gioro Hala (阿颜觉罗氏)
- Ayantatar Hala (阿颜塔塔尔氏)

== B ==
- Ba Hala (把氏) (of Han Chinese Tai Nikan origin)
- Bagiri Hala (巴济哩氏)
- Bai Hala (柏氏) (of Han Chinese Tai Nikan origin)
- Bai Hala (白氏) (of Han Chinese Tai Nikan origin)
- Baica Hala (拜察氏)
- Baican Hala (拜禅氏)
- Baidar Hala (拜达尔氏)
- Baidu Hala (拜都氏)
- Baige Hala (拜格氏)
- Baigiya Hala (拜佳氏)
- Baigiyara Hala (拜嘉拉氏)
- Baijin Hala (拜津氏)
- Baksang Hala (巴克桑氏)
- Barda Hala (巴尔达氏)
- Bari Hala (巴哩氏)
- Barin Hala (巴林氏)
- Barra Hala (巴尔拉氏)
- Barut Hala (巴鲁特氏)
- Basun Hala (巴逊氏)
- Bayak Hala (巴雅克氏)
- Bayan Hala (巴颜氏)
- Bayantu Hala (巴颜图氏)
- Bayara Hala (巴雅拉氏)
- Bayarki Hala (巴雅尔齐氏)
- Bayingeri Hala (拜英格哩氏)
- Bayot Hala (巴岳特氏)
- Bayotu Hala (巴岳图氏)
- Beisu Hala (伯苏氏)
- Beisut Hala (伯苏特氏)
- Bektu Hala (伯克图氏)
- Bian Hala (边氏)
- Biangiya Hala (边佳氏)
- Biaot Hala (表特氏)
- Bira Hala (必喇氏)
- Biru Hala (弼噜氏)
- Birure Hala (必鲁哷氏)
- Birya Hala (弼尔雅氏)
- Bodisi Hala (博第斯氏)
- Boduot Hala (博多特氏)
- Boduri Hala (博都哩氏)
- Bogulot Hala (博古罗特氏)
- Bohelok Hala (博和罗克氏)
- Bohite Hala (博希特氏)
- Boholo Hala (博和罗氏)
- Bohori Hala (博和哩氏)
- Boljok Hala (博勒卓克氏)
- Bolo Hala (博啰氏)
- Bolot Hala (博罗特氏)
- Boogi Hala (宝济氏)
- Boogiya Hala (保佳氏)
- Boorigit Hala (宝里吉特氏)
- Borgi Hala (博尔济氏)
- Borgigin Hala (博尔吉津氏)
- Borgik Hala (博尔济克氏)
- Borgisi Hala (博尔济斯氏)
- Borgun Hala (博尔衮氏)
- Borhigis Hala (博尔奇济斯氏)
- Borholo Hala (博尔和罗氏)
- Borjigin Hala (博尔津氏)
- Borjigit Hala (博尔济吉特氏)
- Bork Hala (博尔克氏)
- Borkit Hala (博尔齐特氏)
- Borsut Hala (博尔苏特氏)
- Bosoo Hala (博硕氏)
- Budara Hala (布达喇氏)
- Bugirgen Hala (布吉尔根氏)
- Bugulut Hala (布古鲁特氏)
- Bukur Hala (布库尔氏)
- Bulamu Hala (布喇穆氏)
- Bulca Hala (布尔察氏)
- Buldurben Hala (布楞都尔本氏)
- Bulhaci Hala (布勒哈齐氏)
- Bulni Hala (布尔尼氏)
- Bultu Hala (布尔图氏)
- Buni Hala (布尼氏)
- Burhacit Hala (布尔哈齐特氏)
- Burut Hala (布鲁特氏)
- Busa Hala (布萨氏)
- Busai Hala (布赛氏)
- Busi Hala (布希氏)
- Busuk Hala (布苏克氏)
- Buyamuci Hala (布雅穆齐氏)

== C ==
- C’ygiya Hala (持佳氏)
- Ca Hala (查氏) (of Han Chinese Tai Nikan origin)
- Cagiya Hala (查佳氏)
- Cahala Hala (察哈喇氏)
- Cai Hala (柴氏) (of Han Chinese Tai Nikan origin)
- Cai Hala (蔡氏) (of Han Chinese Tai Nikan origin)
- Caigiya Hala (蔡佳氏)
- Calagiolo Hala (察喇觉罗氏)
- Canggiya Hala (常佳氏)
- Cao Hala (曹氏)
- Caodan Hala (漕丹氏)
- Caogiya Hala (操佳氏)
- Caomut Hala (超穆特氏)
- Ce Hala (车氏)
- Cemgun Hala (彻穆衮氏)
- Cen Hala (陈氏)
- Ceng Hala (程氏)
- Cenggiya Hala (成佳氏)
- Cengiya Hala (陈佳氏)
- Cengni Hala (成尼氏)
- Ceyere Hala (彻叶哷氏)
- Ci Hala (戚氏)
- Ci Hala (祁氏)
- Cian Hala (钱氏)
- Ciangiya Hala (钱佳氏)
- Ciao Hala (乔氏)
- Ciaogamuk Hala (乔噶木克氏)
- Ciaogiya Hala (乔佳氏)
- Cibogio Hala (齐步樵氏)
- Cibucut Hala (齐布楚特氏)
- Cibukit Hala (齐布齐特氏)
- Cidare Hala (齐达哷氏)
- Cideri Hala (奇德哩氏)
- Cidumu Hala (奇杜穆氏)
- Cigiya Hala (齐佳氏)
- Cikteng Hala (齐克腾氏)
- Cilei Hala (奇垒氏)
- Cileng Hala (奇楞氏)
- Cilik Hala (齐理克氏)
- Cimketu Hala (齐木克图氏)
- Cimo Hala (齐墨氏)
- Cimos Hala (奇墨斯氏)
- Cimot Hala (齐默特氏)
- Cimuk Hala (齐穆克氏)
- Cin Hala (秦氏)
- Cinera Hala (沁鄂喇氏)
- Cinggeri Hala (庆格哩氏)
- Ciog Hala (秋氏)
- Ciog Hala (邱氏)
- Ciogiya Hala (秋佳氏)
- Ciošuri Hala (秋舒哩氏)
- Cirbosu Hala (齐尔博苏氏)
- Cirgote Hala (奇尔果特氏)
- Citela Hala (奇塔喇氏)
- Ciu Hala (屈氏) (of Han Chinese Tai Nikan origin)
- Ciu Hala (曲氏) (of Han Chinese Tai Nikan origin)
- Ciugiya Hala (屈佳氏)
- Ciwangiya Hala (全佳氏)
- Ciya Hala (强氏)
- Ciyahiri Hala (强恰哩氏)
- Ciyakala Hala (恰喀拉氏)
- Ciyala Hala (恰喇氏)
- Ciyarya Hala (强尔雅氏)
- Ciyat Hala (恰特氏)
- Cogira Hala (崇吉喇氏)
- Cogoru Hala (崇果噜氏)
- Cokcin Hala (绰克秦氏)
- Colo Hala (绰罗氏)
- Colos Hala (绰罗斯氏)
- Congnile Hala (丛尼勒氏)
- Cu Hala (褚氏) (of Han Chinese Tai Nikan origin)
- Cui Hala (崔氏) (of Han Chinese Tai Nikan origin)
- Cuigiya Hala (崔佳氏)
- Cuihokin Hala (吹霍克亲氏)
- Cuijuk Hala (崔珠克氏)
- Cuimulu Hala (崔穆鲁氏)
- Cukule Hala (楚库勒氏)
- Cibukinut Hala (齐布齐努特氏)
- Ciyogamut Hala (齐岳噶穆特氏)

== D ==
- Dagiya Hala (大佳氏)
- Dahuri Hala (达呼哩氏)
- Dai Hala (戴氏)
- Daibolo Hala (戴卜罗氏)
- Daicit Hala (岱齐特氏)
- Daigiya Hala (戴佳氏)
- Dalaminan Hala (达喇明安氏)
- Dalok Hala (达啰克氏)
- Dalute Hala (达鲁特氏)
- Daputu Hala (达普图氏)
- Darcongga Hala (达尔充阿氏)
- Darkun Hala (达尔坤氏)
- Dartao Hala (达尔陶氏)
- Dedun Hala (德敦氏)
- Dedure Hala (德都哷氏)
- Deng Hala (邓氏)
- Detecit Hala (德特齐特氏)
- Ding Hala (丁氏) (of Han Chinese Tai Nikan origin)
- Dinggiri Hala (定吉哩氏)
- Dkdari Hala (都克塔理氏)
- Docin Hala (多秦氏)
- Dogin Hala (多锦氏)
- Dohing Hala (多兴氏)
- Dolar Hala (多拉尔氏)
- Dolo Hala (多啰氏)
- Dolohog Hala (多罗宏氏)
- Dolok Hala (多罗科氏)
- Dong Hala (董氏) (of Han Chinese Tai Nikan origin)
- Dongga Hala (栋阿氏)
- Donggiya Hala (栋佳氏)
- Donggo Hala (董鄂氏)
- Donggor Hala (冬果尔氏)
- Dorgun Hala (多尔衮氏)
- Dortara Hala (多尔塔喇氏)
- Du Hala (杜氏) (of Han Chinese Tai Nikan origin)
- Duan Hala (段氏) (of Han Chinese Tai Nikan origin)
- Ducile Hala (杜奇勒氏)
- Dugiya Hala (都佳氏)
- Dukda Hala (都克达氏)
- Dulara Hala (都拉喇氏)
- Duneheng Hala (都讷亨氏)
- Dure Hala (都勒氏)
- Durha Hala (都尔哈氏)
- Duri Hala (都哩氏)
- Durre Hala (都尔勒氏)
- Duru Hala (都噜氏)
- Dusan Hala (都善氏)
- Duwargiya Hala (都瓦尔佳氏)
- Duyar Hala (都雅尔氏)

== E ==
- Elhuiejet Hala (额勒辉额哲特氏)
- Ecin Hala (鄂秦氏)
- Ecolo Hala (鄂绰罗氏)
- Egiri Hala (鄂济哩氏)
- Egit Hala (鄂济特氏)
- Eje Hala (额哲氏)
- Ejet Hala (额哲特氏)
- Ejo Hala (鄂卓氏)
- Eju Hala (额珠氏)
- Ejut Hala (额珠特氏)
- Elakun Hala (鄂拉坤氏)
- Elcolo Hala (鄂勒绰啰氏)
- Elgeji Hala (额尔格济氏)
- Elgetu Hala (额尔格图氏)
- Elhe Hala (额勒赫氏)
- Elo Hala (鄂啰氏)
- Emit Hala (鄂密特氏)
- Emok Hala (鄂谟克氏)
- Emoto Hala (鄂谟拖氏)
- Emuco Hala (鄂木绰氏)
- Emutri Hala (额木特理氏)
- Engite Hala (鄂恩济特氏)
- Eno Hala (鄂诺氏)
- Eraben Hala (鄂拉本氏)
- Ercin Hala (鄂尔沁氏)
- Erdet Hala (额尔德特)
- Erdo Hala (鄂尔多氏)
- Erdun Hala (鄂尔敦氏)
- Erge Hala (鄂尔格氏)
- Ergeten Hala (额尔格特恩氏)
- Ergi Hala (额尔吉氏)
- Ergis Hala (鄂勒济斯氏)
- Ergonote Hala (鄂尔果诺特氏)
- Erik Hala (鄂礼克氏)
- Erimusu Hala (鄂里木苏氏)
- Erket Hala (鄂尔克特氏)
- Erkule Hala (额尔库勒氏)
- Ertu Hala (额尔图氏)
- Ertut Hala (鄂尔图特氏)
- Ese Hala (额色氏)
- Esolo Hala (鄂索啰氏)
- Esurhu Hala (鄂苏尔瑚氏)
- Esuri Hala (额苏哩氏)
- Eto Hala (额托氏)
- Etung Hala (鄂通氏)
- Eyisu Hala (额宜苏氏)
- Eyo Hala (鄂岳氏)
- Eyot Hala (额玉特氏)

== F ==
- Fan Hala (范氏) (of Han Chinese Tai Nikan origin)
- Fang Hala (房氏) (of Han Chinese Tai Nikan origin)
- Fang Hala (方氏) (of Han Chinese Tai Nikan origin)
- Fanggiya Hala (方佳氏)
- Fangiya Hala (范佳氏)
- Fedosimori Hala (佛多锡墨理氏)
- Fei Hala (费氏) (of Han Chinese Tai Nikan origin)
- Feigiya Hala (费佳氏)
- Feimo Hala (费莫氏)
- Feiya Hala (费雅氏)
- Feiyangu Hala (费仰古氏)
- Feng Hala (冯氏) (of Han Chinese Tai Nikan origin)
- Fenggiya Hala (丰佳氏)
- Fu Hala (傅氏) (of Han Chinese Tai Nikan origin)
- Fuca Hala (富察氏)
- Fucen Hala (敷辰氏)
- Fuciri Hala (傅锡哩氏)
- Fugiya Hala (傅佳氏)
- Fujuri Hala (富珠哩氏)
- Fulha Hala (富勒哈氏)
- Fulkuru Hala (富勒库噜氏)
- Fuse Hala (富森氏)
- Fusere Hala (富色哷氏)
- Fusi Hala (福锡氏)
- Fusuhu Hala (富苏瑚氏)
- Fusuku Hala (富思库氏)
- Futa Hala (福塔氏)

== G ==
- Garja Hala (噶尔扎氏)
- Gaogiya Hala (高佳氏）
- Gilaminemat Hala (济喇敏鄂玛特氏)
- Giranggiwarka Hala (吉郎吉瓦尔喀氏)
- Girgi Hala (吉尔吉氏)
- Gi Hala (姬氏) (of Han Chinese Tai Nikan origin)
- Gi Hala (季氏) (of Han Chinese Tai Nikan origin)
- Gi Hala (纪氏) (of Han Chinese Tai Nikan origin)
- Giagiya Hala (贾佳氏)
- Giao Hala (焦氏) (of Han Chinese Tai Nikan origin)
- Gibucu Hala (吉布褚氏)
- Gigiya Hala (纪佳氏)
- Gilara Hala (济拉喇氏)
- Gilat Hala (吉喇特氏)
- Gilet Hala (吉勒特氏)
- Gilut Hala (济鲁特氏)
- Gin Hala (晋氏) (of Han Chinese Tai Nikan origin)
- Gin Hala (金氏) (of Han Chinese Tai Nikan origin)
- Gin Hala (靳氏) (of Han Chinese Tai Nikan origin)
- Ging Hala (井氏) (of Han Chinese Tai Nikan origin)
- Gingciri Hala (精奇哩氏)
- Ginggeri Hala (精格哩氏)
- Ginggi Hala (精吉氏)
- Ginggigi Hala (精吉集氏)
- Ginggiya Hala (景佳氏)
- Gingiya Hala (金佳氏) (of Korean booi aha origin from the Jin (Kim) family of Imperial Noble Consort Shujia, a concubine of the Qing Qianlong emperor)
- Ginmit Hala (金米特氏)
- Giocan Hala (觉禅氏)
- Giogiya Hala (觉佳氏)
- Giolocan Hala (觉罗禅氏)
- Giorca Hala (觉尔察氏)
- Gioro Hala (觉罗氏)
- Girbis Hala (吉尔必斯氏)
- Giri Hala (济礼氏)
- Giritu Hala (吉礼图氏)
- Giru Hala (吉噜氏)
- Git Hala (济特氏)
- Giya Hala (假氏) (of Han Chinese Tai Nikan origin)
- Giya Hala (贾氏) (of Han Chinese Tai Nikan origin)
- Giyabutala Hala (嘉布塔喇氏)
- Giyagiri Hala (佳吉哩氏)
- Giyagiya Hala (嘉佳氏)
- Giyahama Hala (嘉哈玛氏)
- Giyajan Hala (嘉瞻氏)
- Giyamhu Hala (嘉穆呼氏)
- Giyamuhut Gioro Hala (嘉穆瑚觉罗)
- Giyang Hala (姜氏) (of Han Chinese Tai Nikan origin)
- Giyang Hala (江氏) (of Han Chinese Tai Nikan origin)
- Giyang Hala (蒋氏) (of Han Chinese Tai Nikan origin)
- Giyanggi Hala (江吉氏)
- Giyanggiya Hala (姜佳氏)
- Giyanggiya Hala (蒋佳氏)
- Gobulo Hala (郭布罗)
- Gogiya Hala (郭佳氏)
- Gorolo Hala (郭络罗氏)
- Gūwalgiya Hala (瓜爾佳氏)
- Gurhas Hala (钴尔哈苏氏)

== H ==
- Hanggata Hala (杭阿塔氏)
- Hegiya Hala (赫佳氏)
- Hešeri Hala (赫舍里氏)
- Hinggiya Hala (性佳氏)
- Hitara Hala (喜塔腊氏)
- Hoifa Nara Hala (輝發那拉氏)
- Huoshuote Hala (霍硕特氏)

== I ==
- Ilrgi Hala (伊勒尔济氏)
- I Hala (伊氏) (of Han Chinese Tai Nikan origin)
- I Hala (宜氏) (of Han Chinese Tai Nikan origin)
- Ibe Hala (伊伯氏)
- Ibucit Hala (伊布齐特氏)
- Iin Hala (任氏) (of Han Chinese Tai Nikan origin)
- Iingiya Hala (仁佳氏)
- Ijar Hala (伊扎尔氏)
- Ikderi Hala (伊克得里氏)
- Ikminga Hala (伊克明安氏)
- Ikulu Hala (伊库鲁氏)
- Ilaci Hala (伊拉齐氏)
- Ilan Hala (伊喇氏)
- Ilari Hala (伊拉哩氏)
- Ilmen Hala (伊勒们氏)
- Ilmu Hala (伊勒穆氏)
- Imu Hala (伊穆氏)
- Imutu Hala (伊穆图氏)
- Inde Hala (润德氏)
- Io Hala (尤氏) (of Han Chinese Tai Nikan origin)
- Ioge Hala (猷格氏)
- Iogiya Hala (猷佳氏)
- Iohulu Hala (佑祜鲁氏)
- Iongloku Hala (攸啰库氏)
- Iongsebu Hala (永舍布氏)
- Irgen Gioro Hala (伊尔根觉罗氏)
- Irgiya Hala (伊尔佳氏)
- Irha Hala (伊尔哈氏)
- Irkule Hala (伊尔库勒氏)
- Isu Hala (伊苏氏)
- Itemo Hala (宜特墨氏)
- Itumo Hala (伊图默氏)

== J ==
- Jayajala Hala (扎雅扎喇氏)
- Joyan Hala (周延氏)
- Jurgitemok Hala (珠尔吉特鄂谟克氏)
- Jahacit Hala (扎哈齐特氏)
- Ja Hala (扎哈拉氏)
- Jahama Hala (扎哈玛氏)
- Jahasucin Hala (扎哈苏沁氏)
- Jaigiya Hala (翟佳氏)
- Jakta Hala (扎克塔氏)
- Jaku Hala (扎库氏)
- Jakuta Hala (扎库塔氏)
- Jala Hala (扎拉氏)
- Jalai Hala (扎赖氏)
- Jalar Hala (扎拉尔氏)
- Jalari Hala (扎拉哩氏)
- Jalarora Hala (扎拉尔敖拉氏)
- Jaluca Hala (扎鲁察氏)
- Jalut Hala (Sinicized*: 扎噜特氏)
- Jamtai Hala (扎木泰氏)
- Jamuken Hala (扎穆恳氏)
- Jamur Hala (扎穆尔氏)
- Jamuya Hala (扎穆雅氏)
- Jancuhun Hala (瞻楚浑氏)
- Jang Hala (Sinicized*: 张氏) (of Han Chinese Tai Nikan origin)
- Jang Hala (章氏) (of Han Chinese Tai Nikan origin)
- Jangci Hala (章齐氏)
- Janggin (彰锦氏)
- Janggiya Hala (章佳氏)
- Jangjar Hala (彰扎尔氏)
- Jangmu Hala (章穆氏)
- Jangturi Hala (章图哩氏)
- Janni Hala (占尼氏)
- Jarit Hala (扎哩特氏)
- Jas’huuri Hala (扎思瑚哩氏)
- Jasuri Hala (扎苏哩氏)
- Jatehei Hala (扎特黑氏)
- Jebe Hala (哲伯氏)
- Jeng Hala (郑氏) (of Han Chinese Tai Nikan origin)
- Jenggiya Hala (郑佳氏)
- Jengnelut Hala (正讷鲁特氏)
- Jerde Hala (Sinicized*: 哲尔德氏)
- Jergi Hala (哲尔齐氏)
- Jeri Hala (哲哩氏)
- Jo Hala (周氏) (of Han Chinese Tai Nikan origin)
- Jobalut Hala (卓巴鲁特氏)
- Joceng Hala (周成氏)
- Joci Hala (卓奇氏)
- Jocicubut Hala (卓齐楚布特氏)
- Jocis Hala (卓启斯氏)
- Jodomu Hala (卓多穆氏)
- Jogin Hala (卓津氏)
- Jogiya Hala (卓佳氏)
- Jok Hala (卓克氏)
- Jokgiya Hala (卓克佳氏)
- Jong Hala (宗氏) (of Han Chinese Tai Nikan origin)
- Jong Hala (钟氏) (of Han Chinese Tai Nikan origin)
- Jonggi Hala (钟吉氏)
- Jonggiya Hala (宗佳氏)
- Joo Hala (赵氏) (of Han Chinese Tai Nikan origin)
- Joo Hala (邹氏) (of Han Chinese Tai Nikan origin)
- Joobar Hala (兆巴尔氏)
- Joodarhan Hala (兆达尔汉氏)
- Joogiya Hala (兆佳氏)
- Joogiya Hala (肇佳氏)
- Joogiya Hala (邹佳氏)
- Jookit Hala (兆齐特氏)
- Joole Hala (兆垒氏)
- Joolot Hala (兆啰特氏)
- Jooyut Hala (赵禹特氏)
- Jorgut Hala (卓尔古特氏)
- Jorhecin Hala (卓尔和沁氏)
- Jort Hala (卓尔特氏)
- Josan Hala (卓显氏)
- Ju Hala (朱氏) (of Han Chinese Tai Nikan origin)
- Juge Hala (珠格氏)
- Jugede Hala (珠格德氏)
- Jugiya Hala (珠佳氏)
- Jugiya Hala (组佳氏)
- Juhere Hala (珠赫哷氏)
- Jurgen Hala (珠尔根氏)
- Jurgun Hala (朱尔衮氏)
- Jurk Hala (珠尔克氏)
- Jurki Hala (珠尔奇氏)
- Jurkit Hala (珠尔奇特氏)
- Jursu Hala (珠尔苏氏)
- Juru Hala (珠鲁氏)
- Jusiri Hala (珠锡哩氏)
- Juweci Hala (准齐氏)
- Juweta Hala (专塔氏)
- Juwete Hala (卓特氏)
- Juyala Hala (珠雅拉氏)

== K ==
- Kacut Hala (喀楚特氏)
- Kagelr Hala (卡格依尔氏)
- Kailun Hala (凯隆氏)
- Kaiyan Hala (恺颜氏)
- Kaksiri Hala (喀克锡哩氏)
- kala Hala (喀喇氏)
- Kaldasu Hala (喀勒达苏氏)
- Kang Hala (康氏) (of Han Chinese Tai Nikan origin)
- Kanggeda Hala (慷杰达氏)
- Kangsiri Hala (康锡哩氏)
- Kangyili Hala (康仪理氏)
- Karcin Hala (喀喇沁氏)
- Karja Hala (喀尔佳氏)
- Karku Hala (喀尔库氏)
- Karla Hala (喀尔拉氏)
- Karlaha Hala (喀尔拉哈氏)
- Karnot Hala (喀尔诺特氏)
- Karnuk Hala (喀尔努克氏)
- Kartagir Hala (卡尔他吉尔氏)
- Kay Hala (卡宜氏)
- Kertelr Hala (柯尔特依尔氏)
- Keben Hala (科本氏)
- Keciri Hala (科奇哩氏)
- Kein Hala (克音氏)
- Kelde Hala (克勒德氏)
- Kemucu Hala (克穆楚氏)
- Kemucut Hala (克穆楚特氏)
- Kemukit Hala (克穆齐特氏)
- Kercin Hala (科尔沁氏)
- Kerde Hala (克尔德氏)
- Kere Hala (克哷氏)
- Kerit Hala (克哩特氏)
- Kersun Hala (科尔逊氏)
- Kerut Hala (克哷特氏)
- Kesiketeng Hala (克什克腾氏)
- Kete Hala (科特氏)
- Keyere Hala (克叶哷氏)
- Keykere Hala (克依克哷氏)
- Keyilkelei (克伊克勒氏)
- Kodai Hala (叩岱氏)
- Kode Hala (叩德氏)
- Koken Hala (扣恳氏)
- Kong Hala (孔氏) (of Han Chinese Tai Nikan origin)
- Konggolo Hala (崆果啰氏)
- Kongkeri Hala (崆克礼氏)
- Kongnila Hala (孔尼喇氏)
- Koocoli Hala (阔绰里氏)
- Kubuke Hala (库布克氏)
- Kubut Hala (库发廷氏)
- Kubut Hala (库布特氏)
- Kuicelik Hala (奎车里克氏)
- Kuigiya Hala (奎佳氏)
- Kuilong Hala (揆龙氏)
- Kumutu Hala (库穆图氏)
- Kundule Hala (琨都勒氏)
- Kuwarda Hala (夸尔达氏)
- Kuyala Hala (库雅拉氏)

== L ==
- Lai Hala (赖氏) (of Han Chinese Tai Nikan origin)
- Laibu Hala (赖布氏)
- Laimo Hala (来默氏)
- Lakule Hala (拉库勒氏)
- Lang Hala (郎氏) (of Han Chinese Tai Nikan origin)
- Langgiya Hala (郎佳氏)
- Layan Hala (拉颜氏)
- Ledi Hala (勒第氏)
- Lei Hala (雷氏) (of Han Chinese Tai Nikan origin)
- Lengburcin Hala (楞布尔勤氏)
- Li Hala (李氏) (of Han Chinese Tai Nikan origin)
- Liang Hala (梁氏) (of Han Chinese Tai Nikan origin)
- Lianggiya Hala (良佳氏)
- Ligiya Hala (李佳氏)
- Liu Hala (刘氏) (of Han Chinese Tai Nikan origin)
- Lin Hala (林氏) (of Han Chinese Tai Nikan origin)
- Linggirl Hala (留济理氏)
- Lingiya Hala (林佳氏)
- Liugiya Hala (留佳氏/刘佳氏)
- Litari Hala (理塔哩氏)
- Liyala Hala (李雅拉氏)
- Liyu Hala (吕氏) (of Han Chinese Tai Nikan origin)
- Lo Hala (罗氏) (of Han Chinese Tai Nikan origin)
- Loca Hala (罗察氏)
- Logiya Hala (罗佳氏)
- Long Hala (龙氏) (of Han Chinese Tai Nikan origin)
- Loyo Hala (罗岳氏)
- Lu Hala (卢氏) (of Han Chinese Tai Nikan origin)
- Lu Hala (陆氏) (of Han Chinese Tai Nikan origin)
- Luruhuo Hala (卢如火氏)

== M ==
- Morjigite Hala (墨尔济吉特氏)
- Ma Hala (马氏) (of Han Chinese Tai Nikan origin)
- Maca Hala (玛察氏)
- Magiya Hala (马佳氏)
- Magus Hala (玛古思氏)
- Magut Hala (玛古特氏)
- Mahalr Hala (玛那依尔氏)
- Majak Hala (玛扎克氏)
- Malakur Hala (玛拉库尔氏)
- Malalr Hala (玛拉依尔氏)
- Malangga Hala (玛朗阿氏)
- Malara Hala (玛喇拉氏)
- Manggenut Hala (莽格努特氏)
- Manggico Hala (莽吉绰氏)
- Manggiya Hala (莽佳氏)
- Manggo Hala (莽果氏)
- Mangin Hala (满津氏)
- Mangnut Hala (莽努特氏)
- Manja Hala (满扎氏)
- Maoyi Hala (茂仪氏)
- Mardan Hala (玛尔丹氏)
- Margit Hala (玛尔吉特氏)
- Martun Hala (玛尔屯氏)
- Mei Hala (梅氏) (of Han Chinese Tai Nikan origin)
- Meigiya Hala (梅佳氏)
- Meiheri Hala (梅赫哩氏)
- Meile Hala (梅勒氏)
- Meileng Hala (梅楞氏)
- Meng Hala (孟氏) (of Han Chinese Tai Nikan origin)
- Mengero Hala (蒙鄂啰氏)
- Menggiya Hala (盟佳氏)
- Menggosi Hala (蒙果资氏)
- Menggucu Hala (蒙古楚氏)
- Menggurgi Hala (蒙古尔济氏)
- Mengkyire Hala (孟克伊哷氏)
- Mengnat Hala (莽那特氏)
- Miao Hala (苗氏) (of Han Chinese Tai Nikan origin)
- Migiya Hala (米佳氏)
- Mija Hala (密扎氏)
- Min Hala (闵氏) (of Han Chinese Tai Nikan origin)
- Minggan Hala (明安氏)
- Mo Hala (莫氏) (of Han Chinese Tai Nikan origin)
- Mogiya Hala (墨佳氏)
- Mohuri Hala (墨呼哩氏)
- Mokele Hala (墨克勒氏)
- Moketing Hala (墨克廷氏)
- Moketo Hala (谟克拖氏)
- Molci Hala (墨勒齐氏)
- Molciri Hala (谟勒齐哩氏)
- Moldire Hala (墨勒迪哷氏)
- Moljere Hala (墨勒哲哷氏)
- Moneher Hala (墨讷赫尔氏)
- Mongeso Hala (蒙鄂索氏)
- Monggo Hala (蒙果氏)
- Monggu Hala (蒙古氏)
- Mongguri Hala (蒙古里氏)
- Morci Hala (墨尔齐氏)
- Morcin Hala (墨尔秦氏)
- Morcit Hala (墨尔奇特氏)
- Mordaja Hala (墨尔达扎氏)
- Mordi Hala (墨尔迪氏)
- Mordin Hala (莫尔登氏)
- More Hala (墨哷氏)
- Morgi Hala (墨尔吉氏)
- Morho Hala (墨尔赫氏)
- Mosire Hala (谟锡哷氏)
- Moyolo Hala (谟岳啰氏)
- Mu Hala (牧氏) (of Han Chinese Tai Nikan origin)
- Mu Hala (穆氏) (of Han Chinese Tai Nikan origin)
- Muca Hala (穆察氏)
- Mudaci Hala (穆达齐氏)
- Mugiya Hala (穆佳氏)
- Muhelin Hala (穆和林氏)
- Mukderi Hala (木克得立氏)
- Muki Hala (穆齐氏)
- Muktu Hala (穆克图氏)
- Mulde Hala (穆勒德氏)
- Muliyalian Hala (穆里雅连氏)
- Murca Hala (穆尔察氏)
- Muru Hala (穆鲁氏)
- Musecen Hala (穆色辰氏)
- Muya Hala (穆雅氏)
- Muyan Hala (穆颜氏)

== N ==
- Nahata Hala (纳哈塔氏)
- Naikiri Hala (鼐奇哩氏)
- Naikite Hala (鼐奇特氏)
- Naiman Hala (奈曼氏)
- Nakta Hala (那克塔氏)
- Nalgiya Hala (那勒加氏)
- Namdulu Hala (那木都鲁氏)
- Namutu Hala (那木图氏)
- Nanfulu Hala (南福禄氏)
- Nanggiya Hala (囊佳氏)
- Nanggiyat Hala (囊佳特氏)
- Nara Hala (纳喇氏)
- Narai Hala (纳赖氏)
- Nata Hala (纳塔氏)
- Naya Hala (纳雅氏)
- Nayi Hala (纳伊氏)
- Nedi Hala (讷迪氏)
- Nere Hala (讷哷氏)
- Ni Hala (倪氏) (of Han Chinese Tai Nikan origin)
- Nigele Hala (尼格勒氏)
- Nigiya Hala (尼佳氏)
- Niheri Hala (尼赫理氏)
- Nijuhun Hala (尼珠珲氏)
- Nikiri Hala (尼奇哩氏)
- Nila Hala (尼拉氏)
- Nimaca Hala (尼玛察氏)
- Nimaci Hala (尼玛奇氏)
- Nimaha Hala (尼玛哈氏)
- Nimanggi Hala (尼满吉氏)
- Ning Hala (宁氏) (of Han Chinese Tai Nikan origin)
- Ning Hala (聂氏) (of Han Chinese Tai Nikan origin)
- Ninggeri Hala (聂格哩氏)
- Ninggiya Hala (宁佳氏)
- Ninggiya Hala (聂佳氏)
- Ninggiyat Hala (宁佳特氏)
- Ningguta Hala (宁古塔氏)
- Ninju Hala (尼珠氏)
- Nio Hala (牛氏) (of Han Chinese Tai Nikan origin)
- Nio Hala (钮氏) (of Han Chinese Tai Nikan origin)
- Niogiya Hala (牛佳氏)
- Niohe Hala (钮赫氏)
- Niohere Hala (钮赫哷氏)
- Niohule Hala (钮胡勒氏)
- Niohuru Hala (钮祜禄氏)
- Niohurubu Hala (钮祜禄布氏)
- Niohut Hala (钮瑚特氏)
- Niolun Hala (钮抡氏)
- Niotu Hala (钮图氏)
- Niowanggiyan Hala (钮旺坚氏)
- Nioyan Hala (钮颜氏)
- Niri Hala (尼理氏)
- Nisa Hala (尼沙氏)
- Nisiri Hala (尼锡哩氏)
- Niyangniya Hala (尼扬尼雅氏)
- Niyngtu Hala (尼音图氏)
- Niyongt Hala (尼庸特氏)
- Nolo Hala (诺罗氏)
- Nonggile Hala (农吉勒氏)
- Nonr Hala (努尔哈拉氏)
- Noulet Hala (诺勒特氏)
- Nouliet Hala (耨埒特氏)
- Nulu Hala (努鲁氏)
- Nurhan Hala (努尔汉氏)
- Nutelun Hala (努特伦氏)

== P ==
- Pan Hala (潘氏) (of Han Chinese Tai Nikan origin)
- Pang Hala (庞氏) (of Han Chinese Tai Nikan origin)
- Panggiya Hala (庞佳氏)
- Pei Hala (裴氏) (of Han Chinese Tai Nikan origin)
- Peigiya Hala (培佳氏)
- Peng Hala (彭氏) (of Han Chinese Tai Nikan origin)
- Piao Hala (朴氏) (of Han Chinese Tai Nikan origin)
- Piaogiya Hala (飘佳氏)
- Po Hala (坡氏) (of Han Chinese Tai Nikan origin)
- Pogiya Hala (颇佳氏)
- Pugiya Hala (普佳氏)

== R ==
- Rao Hala (劳氏) (of Han Chinese Tai Nikan origin)
- Raoguo Hala (老沟氏)
- Ru Hala (鲁氏) (of Han Chinese Tai Nikan origin)
- Ruburi Hala (鲁布哩氏)
- Ruyere Hala (禄叶哷氏)

== S ==
- Sailgi Hala (塞楞吉氏)
- Sayinsartu Hala (赛音萨尔图氏)
- Sayin Noyan Hala (赛音诺颜氏)
- Salatuluteng Hala (沙喇图鲁腾氏)
- Selje Hala (色勒杰氏)
- Sereri Hala (色哷哩氏)
- Sernoloyasu Hala (舍尔诺罗雅苏氏)
- Socala Hala (索察喇氏)
- Suduri Hala (苏都哩氏)
- Saca Hala (萨察氏)
- Saca Giorca Hala (塔察觉尔察氏)
- Sacahai Hala (沙查海氏)
- Sadala Hala (沙达喇氏)
- Sahalgi Hala (萨哈勒济氏)
- Sahalian Hala (萨哈连氏)
- Saharca Hala (萨哈尔察氏)
- Saiheri Hala (塞赫哩氏)
- Saiktu Hala (塞克图氏)
- Saimire Hala (赛密哷氏)
- Sakca Hala (萨克察氏)
- Sakda Hala (萨克达氏)
- Sala Hala (沙拉氏)
- Salatak Hala (萨拉塔克氏)
- Salatjo Hala (萨喇特卓氏)
- Salatu Hala (萨喇图氏)
- Saljut Hala (萨勒珠特氏)
- Samala Hala (萨玛喇氏)
- Samargi Hala (萨玛尔吉氏)
- Samusir Hala (萨木希尔氏)
- Sang Hala (商氏) (of Han Chinese Tai Nikan origin)
- Sang Hala (尚氏) (of Han Chinese Tai Nikan origin)
- Sanggiya Hala (商佳氏)
- Sardu Hala (萨尔都氏)
- Sartu Hala (萨尔图氏)
- Sartuk Hala (萨尔图克氏)
- Sartun Hala (萨尔屯氏)
- Sarut Hala (萨噜特氏)
- Sayot Hala (沙岳特氏)
- Sece Hala (色彻氏)
- Semukiri Hala (色木奇哩氏)
- Sen Hala (沈氏) (of Han Chinese Tai Nikan origin)
- Senggiya Hala (盛佳氏)
- Sengiya Hala (申佳氏)
- Senmuri Hala (申穆哩氏)
- Seyan Hala (舍颜氏)
- Si Hala (史氏) (of Han Chinese Tai Nikan origin)
- Si Hala (司氏) (of Han Chinese Tai Nikan origin)
- Si Hala (施氏) (of Han Chinese Tai Nikan origin)
- Si Hala (时氏) (of Han Chinese Tai Nikan origin)
- Si Hala (石氏) (of Han Chinese Tai Nikan origin)
- Sia Hala (夏氏) (of Han Chinese Tai Nikan origin)
- Siandacan Hala (贤达禅氏)
- Siang Hala (向氏) (of Han Chinese Tai Nikan origin)
- Siboocan Hala (实宝禅氏)
- Siburu Hala (希卜鲁氏)
- Sibusu Hala (希卜苏氏)
- Sicigir Hala (席奇吉尔氏)
- Sie Hala (谢氏) (of Han Chinese Tai Nikan origin)
- Sifaci Hala (西法齐氏)
- Sifuca Hala (石富察氏)
- Šigiya Hala (司佳氏)
- Šigiya Hala (石佳氏)
- Sija Hala (喜瞻氏)
- Sikde Hala (锡克德氏)
- Sikegira Hala (锡克济拉氏)
- Sikteri Hala (锡克特哩氏)
- Silde Hala (锡喇德氏)
- Silergi Hala (锡勒尔吉氏)
- Silin Hala (锡璘氏)
- Sirin Gioro Hala (西林觉罗氏)
- Siltu Hala (锡喇图氏)
- Siluk Hala (锡鲁克氏)
- Silut Hala (席鲁特氏)
- Simara Hala (锡玛喇氏)
- Simolie Hala (锡墨埒氏)
- Simulu Hala (石穆鲁氏)
- Sin Hala (辛氏) (of Han Chinese Tai Nikan origin)
- Sinaminga Hala (锡纳明安氏)
- Sinecuk Hala (锡讷楚克氏)
- Sinet Hala (锡讷特氏)
- Sing Hala (邢氏) (of Han Chinese Tai Nikan origin)
- Sinurhu Hala (希努尔呼氏)
- Sio Hala (肖氏) (of Han Chinese Tai Nikan origin)
- Sio Hala (萧氏) (of Han Chinese Tai Nikan origin)
- Sira Hala (锡喇氏)
- Sirbi Hala (锡尔弼氏)
- Sirdet Hala (锡尔德特氏)
- Sire Hala (实哷氏)
- Sirgiya Hala (奚尔佳氏)
- Sirha Hala (锡尔哈氏)
- Sirhin Hala (锡尔馨氏)
- Sirtu Hala (锡尔图氏)
- Sisar Hala (希萨尔氏)
- Sisiya Hala (锡强氏)
- Sitara Hala (喜塔喇氏)
- Siu Hala (徐氏) (of Han Chinese Tai Nikan origin)
- Siu Hala (许氏) (of Han Chinese Tai Nikan origin)
- Siuca Hala (叙察氏)
- Siugi Hala (徐吉氏)
- Siugiya Hala (徐佳氏)
- Siuncaol Hala (逊绰尔氏)
- Siungin Hala (逊津氏)
- Siuniyaote Hala (逊尼耀特氏)
- Siyogiya Hala (休佳氏)
- Siyoheri Hala (修和理氏)
- Siyomori Hala (修墨哩氏)
- So Hala (受氏) (of Han Chinese Tai Nikan origin)
- Soca Hala (索察氏)
- Soceri Hala (索彻哩氏)
- Soceri Hala (索齐哷氏)
- Socoro Hala (索绰罗氏)
- Socor Hala (索绰尔氏)
- Sodoli Hala (索多哩氏)
- Sogiya Hala (索佳氏)
- Sogiyala Hala (索济雅喇氏)
- Soiehogin Hala (索勒霍金氏)
- Solocia Hala (索啰恰氏)
- Solongar Hala (索罗噶尔氏)
- Solongus Hala (索龙古斯氏)
- Sonotu Hala (索诺图氏)
- Sordo Hala (索尔多氏)
- Sorgi Hala (索尔济氏)
- Su Hala (苏氏) (of Han Chinese Tai Nikan origin)
- Suan Hala (宣氏) (of Han Chinese Tai Nikan origin)
- Sue Hala (薛氏) (of Han Chinese Tai Nikan origin)
- Šufaca Hala (舒发察氏)
- Sugiya Hala (孙佳氏)
- Šugiya Hala (舒佳氏)
- Sugiya Hala (苏佳氏)
- Suigiya Hala (随佳氏)
- Sukca Hala (苏克察氏)
- Šukduri Hala (舒克都哩氏)
- Sulara Hala (苏拉喇氏)
- Šulu Hala (舒禄氏)
- Sumari Hala (书玛哩氏)
- Sumir Hala (苏密尔氏)
- Sumuca Hala (苏穆察氏)
- Sumuk Hala (苏木克氏)
- Šumur Hala (舒穆尔氏)
- Šumuri Hala (舒墨哩氏)
- Šumuri Hala (舒穆哩氏)
- Šumuru Hala (舒穆禄氏)
- Sun Hala (孙氏) (of Han Chinese Tai Nikan origin)
- Sunbulu Hala (顺布鲁氏)
- Suncor Hala (荪绰尔氏)
- Sung Hala (宋氏) (of Han Chinese Tai Nikan origin)
- Sung Hala (松氏) (of Han Chinese Tai Nikan origin)
- Sunggi Hala (松吉氏)
- Sunggiya Hala (嵩佳氏)
- Sungyan Hala (松颜氏)
- Sunit Hala (苏尼特氏)
- Šurdu Hala (舒尔都氏)
- Surgiya Hala (苏尔佳氏)
- Šuru Hala (舒噜氏)
- Šušan Gioro Hala (舒善觉罗氏)
- Šušu Gioro Hala (舒舒觉罗氏)

== T ==
- Tegi Hala (特济氏)
- Tie Hala (铁氏) (of Han Chinese Tai Nikan origin)
- Tabennutuk Hala (塔本努图克氏)
- Taicu Hala (台楚氏)
- Taicuru Hala (泰楚噜氏)
- Taicut Hala (泰楚特氏)
- Taihut Hala (泰瑚特氏)
- Taisinara Hala (泰锡纳喇氏)
- Talbacik Hala (塔喇巴齐克氏)
- Tamuca Hala (塔穆察氏)
- Tan Hala (谈氏) (of Han Chinese Tai Nikan origin)
- Tan Hala (谭氏) (of Han Chinese Tai Nikan origin)
- Tang Hala (唐氏) (of Han Chinese Tai Nikan origin)
- Tang Hala (汤氏) (of Han Chinese Tai Nikan origin)
- Tangda Hala (唐达氏)
- Tanggiya Hala (唐佳氏)
- Tanggu Hala (唐古氏)
- Tanggur Hala (唐古尔氏)
- Tanggut Hala (唐古特氏)
- Tangni Hala (唐尼氏)
- Tangyan Hala (唐颜氏)
- Tankai Hala (坦开氏)
- Tao Hala (陶氏) (of Han Chinese Tai Nikan origin)
- Taogiya Hala (陶佳氏)
- Tara Hala (塔喇氏)
- Tarhunut Hala (塔尔瑚努特氏)
- Tatan Hala (塔坦氏)
- Tatar Hala (塔塔儿氏)
- Tatara Hala (他塔喇氏)
- Tergir Hala (特尔吉尔氏)
- Tian Hala (田氏) (of Han Chinese Tai Nikan origin)
- Tiangiya Hala (田佳氏)
- Tohercin Hala (托和尔秦氏)
- Tohoro Hala (托和啰氏)
- Tolgiya Hala (托勒佳氏)
- Tolot Hala (托罗特氏)
- Tomo Hala (托谟氏)
- Tong Hala (佟氏) (of Han Chinese Tai Nikan origin)
- Tongiya Hala (佟佳氏)
- Tongala Hala (通阿拉氏)
- Tongelo Hala (佟鄂啰氏)
- Tonggosu Hala (通果苏氏)
- Tongnigot Hala (佟尼果特氏)
- Tongniyot Hala (佟尼耀特氏)
- Tongyangiolo Hala (通颜觉罗氏)
- Tori Hala (托里氏)
- Tsanggiya Hala (仓佳氏)
- Tsangmargi Hala (苍马尔纪氏)
- Tu Hala (图氏) (of Han Chinese Tai Nikan origin)
- Tu Hala (屠氏) (of Han Chinese Tai Nikan origin)
- Tubot Hala (图伯特氏)
- Tubusu Hala (图布苏氏)
- Tugiya Hala (图佳氏)
- Tukcinara Hala (图克齐纳喇氏)
- Tukdun Hala (图克敦氏)
- Tuktan Hala (图克坦氏)
- Tulolut Hala (图罗鲁特氏)
- Tulri Hala (图勒哩氏)
- Tumen Hala (图们氏)
- Tumot Hala (土默特氏)
- Tunggiya Hala (佟佳氏)
- Tungki Hala (佟启氏)
- Tungsaire Hala (佟赛哷氏)
- Tungsairi Hala (通赛理氏)
- Turdun Hala (图尔敦氏)
- Turge Hala (图尔格氏)
- Turgiya Hala (图尔佳氏)
- Turtara Hala (图尔塔喇氏)
- Tusala Hala (图萨喇氏)
- Tuseri Hala (图色哩氏)

== U ==
- U Hala (吴氏) (of Han Chinese Tai Nikan origin)
- Ucala Hala (乌察喇氏)
- Ucehe Hala (倭彻赫氏)
- Uceku Hala (倭彻库氏)
- Ucere Hala (倭彻埒氏)
- Ucikiri Hala (乌齐熙理氏)
- Ucikit Hala (乌齐喜特氏)
- Uciyarkan Hala (乌恰尔坎氏)
- Ucuke Hala (乌楚肯氏)
- Ugigiyala Hala (乌济佳喇氏)
- Ugiket Hala (吴济克忒氏)
- Ugiya Hala (乌佳氏)
- Ugiya Hala (武佳氏)
- Uhe Hala (倭赫氏)
- Uja Hala (吴扎氏)
- Ujaku Hala (乌扎库氏)
- Ujalhu Hala (乌扎勒瑚氏)
- Ujara Hala (乌扎喇氏)
- Ujigit Hala (乌济奇特氏)
- Ukeding Hala (吴克定氏)
- Ukudenggi Hala (乌库登吉氏)
- Ukuri Hala (乌库理氏)
- Ula Hala (乌拉氏)
- Ulan Hala (乌兰氏)
- Ulanghai Hala (乌梁海氏)
- Ulanghaigilmo Hala (乌梁海济勒默氏)
- Ulanghat Hala (乌朗哈特氏)
- Ulat Hala (乌喇特氏)
- Ulatehake Hala (乌喇特哈克氏)
- Ulhanga Hala (乌尔杭阿氏)
- Ulie Hala (倭埒氏)
- Uligin Hala (乌哩津氏)
- Ulin Hala (乌璘氏)
- Uling'a Hala (乌灵阿氏)
- Ulri Hala (乌勒哩氏)
- Ulsi Hala (乌勒锡氏)
- Uluri Hala (乌鲁哩氏)
- Ulut Hala (乌噜特氏)
- Umi Hala (乌密氏)
- Umu Hala (吴穆氏)
- Unat Hala (乌纳特氏)
- Unehucin Hala (乌讷虎沁氏)
- Unemur Hala (乌讷穆尔氏)
- Unin Hala (武聂氏)
- Uninci Hala (乌聂齐氏)
- Unuci Hala (吴努齐氏)
- Unuhu Hala (乌努呼氏)
- Urda Hala (乌尔达氏)
- Urgeci Hala (乌尔格齐氏)
- Urgucen Hala (乌尔古宸氏)
- Urgunkele Hala (乌尔衮克勒氏)
- Urhan Hala (乌尔汉氏)
- Urhugi Hala (乌尔瑚济氏)
- Urisu Hala (乌礼苏氏)
- Urit Hala (乌哩特氏)
- Uru Hala (乌努氏)
- Uru Hala (乌噜氏)
- Use Hala (乌色氏)
- Usi Hala (乌锡氏)
- Usira Hala (乌什拉氏)
- Usujan Hala (乌苏占氏)
- Usun Hala (乌苏氏)
- Usuri Hala (乌苏哩氏)
- Uya Hala (乌雅氏)
- Uyaca Hala (乌雅察氏)
- Uyan Hala (吴然氏)
- Uyanki Hala (乌颜齐氏)
- Uyara Hala (乌雅拉氏)
- Uyo Hala (武尧氏)
- Uyu Hala (乌裕氏)

== W ==
- Wa Hala (瓦氏) (of Han Chinese Tai Nikan origin)
- Walan Hala (瓦兰氏)
- Walgiya Hala (瓦勒佳氏)
- Wamo Hala (瓦墨氏)
- Wan Hala (万氏) (of Han Chinese Tai Nikan origin)
- Wang Hala (汪氏) (of Han Chinese Tai Nikan origin)
- Wang Hala (王氏) (of Han Chinese Tai Nikan origin)
- Wanggi Hala (旺吉氏)
- Wanyan Hala (完颜氏)
- Wanggiya Hala (汪佳氏)
- Wanggurcin Hala (旺古尔沁氏)
- Wangjabu Hala (旺扎布氏)
- Wangjar Hala (旺扎尔氏)
- Wangšut Hala (旺舒特氏)
- Wanlioha Hala (万旒哈氏)
- Wargi Hala (瓦尔吉氏)
- Wari Hala (瓦哩氏)
- Warka Hala (瓦尔喀氏)
- Wasan Hala (瓦三氏)
- Wase Hala (瓦色氏)
- Wegi Hala (鄂济氏)
- Wei Hala (卫氏) (of Han Chinese Tai Nikan origin)
- Wei Hala (魏氏) (of Han Chinese Tai Nikan origin)
- Weigiya Hala (魏佳氏) (of Han Chinese origin)
- Weigut Hala (威古特氏)
- Weilalr Hala (魏拉依尔氏)
- Wen Hala (文氏) (of Han Chinese Tai Nikan origin)
- Wen Hala (闻氏) (of Han Chinese Tai Nikan origin)
- Wenca Hala (温察氏)
- Wencara Hala (温察拉氏)
- Wenceheng Hala (温彻亨氏)
- Wenda Hala (文达氏)
- Wende Hala (文德氏)
- Wendenge Hala (温登额氏)
- Wendu Hala (温都氏)
- Wengari Hala (翁阿里氏)
- Wenggilgin Hala (翁集尔金氏)
- Wenggit Hala (翁吉特氏)
- Wenggori Hala (翁郭里氏)
- Wenggot Hala (翁果特氏)
- Wengiya Hala (温佳氏)
- Wengket Hala (翁科特氏)
- Wengniolo Hala (翁钮啰氏)
- Wengniri Hala (翁尼哩氏)
- Wengnit Hala (翁尼特氏)
- Wengnot Hala (翁牛特氏)
- Wengsejan Hala (翁舍占氏)
- Wenja Hala (文札氏)
- Wentehe Hala (温特赫氏)
- Wentun Hala (温屯氏)

== Y ==
- Ya Hala (雅氏) (of Han Chinese Tai Nikan origin)
- Yagiya Hala (雅佳氏)
- Yan Hala (严氏) (of Han Chinese Tai Nikan origin)
- Yan Hala (鄢氏) (of Han Chinese Tai Nikan origin)
- Yan Hala (阎氏) (of Han Chinese Tai Nikan origin)
- Yan Hala (颜氏) (of Han Chinese Tai Nikan origin)
- Yang Hala (杨氏) (of Han Chinese Tai Nikan origin)
- Yangai Hala (扬蔼氏)
- Yangeri Hala (扬额理氏)
- Yanggi Hala (扬吉氏)
- Yanggiya Hala (扬佳氏)
- Yangi Hala (颜济氏)
- Yangiri Hala (颜济哩氏)
- Yangiya Hala (阎佳氏)
- Yangna Hala (扬那氏)
- Yanja Hala (颜扎氏)
- Yanju Hala (颜珠氏)
- Yao Hala (姚氏) (of Han Chinese Tai Nikan origin)
- Yaogiya Hala (耀佳氏)
- Yarhu Hala (雅尔胡氏)
- Yarsara Hala (雅尔萨喇氏)
- Yasu Hala (雅苏氏)
- Ye Hala (叶氏) (of Han Chinese Tai Nikan origin)
- Yegulut Hala (叶古禄特氏)
- Yehe Hala (叶赫氏)
- Yehele Hala (叶赫勒氏)
- Yekejong Hala (叶克忠氏)
- Yekuri Hala (叶库哩氏)
- Yelu Hala (叶禄氏)
- Yemole Hala (叶墨勒氏)
- Yemu Hala (叶穆氏)
- Yiogeri Hala (猷格理氏)
- Ying Hala (尹氏) (of Han Chinese Tai Nikan origin)
- Yingai Hala (音斋氏)
- Yinggiya Hala (英佳氏)
- Yingiya Hala (音佳氏)
- Yo Hala (岳氏) (of Han Chinese Tai Nikan origin)
- Yoca Hala (岳察氏)
- Yokre Hala (尤克热氏)
- Yolocin Hala (岳罗沁氏)
- Yonot Hala (岳诺特氏)
- Yu Hala (于氏) (of Han Chinese Tai Nikan origin)
- Yu Hala (俞氏) (of Han Chinese Tai Nikan origin)
- Yuan Hala (袁氏) (of Han Chinese Tai Nikan origin)
- Yugiya Hala (于佳氏)
- Yugiya Hala (虞佳氏)
- Yuhuru Hala (裕瑚噜氏)
- Yukmo Hala (玉克墨氏)
- Yukure Hala (玉库哷氏)
- Yulu Hala (玉鲁氏)
- Yur Hala (禹尔氏)
- Yurku Hala (玉尔库氏)
- Yurkure Hala (裕尔库哷氏)
- Yutumo Hala (玉图墨氏)

== Sources ==
- 清朝通志•氏族略•满洲八旗姓
- 黑龙江志稿•氏族志
- 八旗通志•烈女传
- Gorelova, Liliya M., ed. (2002). Handbook of Oriental Studies. Section 8 Uralic & Central Asian Studies, Manchu Grammar. Vol. Seven Manchu Grammar. Brill Academic Pub. ISBN 9004123075.
