= Kumutu =

Kumutu may refer to

- Kumutu Hala, a Manchu clan, Manchuria, China
- Te Kumutu, part of the Ngāpuhi people of New Zealand
