= Changning, Prince Gong =

Changning
- Prince Gong of the First Rank

Head of the Prince Gong peerage
- Reign: 1671–1703
- Predecessor: Peerage created
- Successor: Haishan (海善)
- Born: 8 December 1657
- Died: 20 July 1703 (aged 45)
- Consorts: Lady Nara (納喇氏); Lady Ma (馬氏); Lady Šušu Gioro (舒舒覺羅氏); Lady Chen (陳氏); Lady Jin (晉氏); Lady Sakda (薩克達氏); Lady Niohuru (鈕鈷祿氏); Lady Wu (吳氏)
- Issue: Yongshou (永壽); Manduhu (滿都祜); Haishan (海善); Duiqing'e (對青額); Zhuotai (卓泰); Wenshubao (文殊保); Princess Chunxi of the First Rank (固倫純禧公主)
Names
- Aisin Gioro Changning (愛新覺羅·常寧)
- House: Aisin Gioro
- Father: Shunzhi Emperor
- Mother: Lady Chen (陳氏)

Changning
- Traditional Chinese: 常寧
- Simplified Chinese: 常宁
Transcriptions
Standard Mandarin
- Hanyu Pinyin: Chángníng

Changning (8 December 1657 – 20 July 1703), alternatively named Changying (常穎), noble title Prince Gong of the First Rank, was an imperial prince of the Qing dynasty of China. He was the fifth son of the Shunzhi Emperor, making him a half-brother of the Kangxi Emperor.

== Life ==
Changning received his princedom on 1 March 1671. In August 1690, he was named one of two commanders-in-chief for an expedition against Dzungar leader Galdan, a long-time enemy of the Qing Empire. Having been granted the title of "Great General Who Pacifies the North" (安北大將軍), he was ordered to march his armies through the Xifengkou Pass (喜峰口) north of Beijing, and then to combine his forces with those of his half-brother, Fuquan, the other commander-in-chief, in order to attack Galdan. They reached Galdan's position on September 3, but after a battle that ended in a standstill, they let Galdan escape, a mistake for which Changning was stripped of his place on the Deliberative Council of Princes and High Officials. In 1696, Changning took part in a new campaign that decisively weakened Galdan before the latter's final defeat in 1697. When he died on 20 July 1703, Changning was not given posthumous honors equal to his princely rank, and was not allowed to pass on his title to his descendants, who instead inherited diminished ranks according to the laws concerning the transmission of Qing nobility titles.

== Family ==
Primary Consort

- First primary consort, of the Nara clan (嫡福晉 那拉氏)
- Second primary consort, of the Ma clan (嫡福晉 馬氏)
  - Yongshou, General of the Second Rank (輔國將軍 永綬; 15 December 1671 – 7 June 1686), first son

Concubine

- Mistress, of the Jin clan (晉氏)
  - Princess Chunxi of the First Rank (固倫純禧公主; 28 December 1671 – 13 January 1742), first daughter
    - Married Bandi (班第; 1664–1755) of the Khorchin Borjigit clan in 1690
  - Third daughter (23 December 1674 – January/February 1681)
  - Fourth daughter (3 December 1676 – January/February 1679)
- Mistress, of the Šušu Gioro clan (舒舒覺羅氏)
  - Manduhu, Duke of the First Rank (鎮國公 滿都護; 25 October 1674 – 11 June 1731), second son
  - Fifth daughter (8 January 1677 – December 1678 or January 1679)
- Mistress, of the Chen clan (陳氏)
  - Second daughter (30 March 1674 – May/June 1695)
    - Married Du'erma (杜爾瑪) of the Manchu Gūwalgiya clan in September/October 1688
  - Haishan, Prince Ximin of the Third Rank (僖敏貝勒 海善; 4 June 1676 – 21 March 1743), third son
- Mistress, of the Sakda clan (薩克達氏)
  - Duiqing'e, General of the Second Rank (輔國將軍 對清額; 17 March 1681 – 4 October 1742), fourth son
  - Zhuotai, General of the Second Rank (輔國將軍 卓泰; 21 September 1683 – 4 July 1705), fifth son
  - Seventh daughter (5 April 1686 – September/October 1687)
- Mistress, of the Niohuru clan (鈕祜祿氏)
  - Sixth daughter (22 August 1684 – April/May 1712)
    - Married Du'erma (杜爾瑪) of the Manchu Gūwalgiya clan in January/February 1698
- Mistress, of the Wu clan (吳氏)
  - Wenshubao (文殊保; 26 February 1687 – 4 October 1708), sixth son

== In fiction and popular culture ==
- Portrayed by Tsui Wing in The Life and Times of a Sentinel (2011).

== See also ==
- Royal and noble ranks of the Qing dynasty
- Ranks of imperial consorts in China#Qing
