= Ula Nara =

Manchu clan and family name

Manchu name
- Manchu script: ᡠᠯᠠ ᠨᠠᡵᠠ
- Möllendorff: ula nara

Chinese name
- Chinese: 乌拉那拉氏
Transcriptions
Standard Mandarin
- Hanyu Pinyin: wū lā nà lā shì

Pronunciation respelling name
- Pronunciation respelling: WOO-lah-NAH-rah

Ula Nara is a one of the four major branches of the Nara clan and among the eight greatest Manchu families in some of the historical records during Qing dynasty. It was also the ruling clan of the Ula tribal nation (乌拉國, 1561-1613). According to the clan history, its ancestor Nacibulu, the founder of the Hūlun tribal confederation, was allegedly descended from the imperial family of the Jurchen Jin Dynasty. His descendants later established the tribal nations of Ula and Hada after the confederation's disintegration due to the invasion of the Mongol Khan Toghtoa Bukha., while later on, some Ula Nara clansmen moved to Mount Ihan (宜罕山) area further branched the clan by adopting the surname of Ilari. Under Ula's last ruler Bujantai, Ula Nara clansmen were eventually conquered by Nurhaci and incorporated into his Eight Banners military forces.

During the Qing dynasty, the Ula Nara produced numerous influential imperial consorts. Notable members included the Great Consort of Nurhaci, mother of Princes Ajige, Dorgon, and Dodo; a secondary empress of Hong Taiji, mother of Hooge; and Empress Xiaojingxian, wife of the Yongzheng Emperor and mother of Honghui. Following the fall of the Qing dynasty, different from other Nara clan who commonly chosen Na (那) as Sino surname, many descendants adopted Zhao (赵), while others used Xiang (相), Na, Tong (桐), and Gang (冮).

== Overview ==
The ruling family of the former Ula state formed the most prominent branch of the clan. Descendants of Bujantai khan served as banner commanders, guards, and military officials, with many receiving hereditary titles. Descendants of Mantai, Bujantai's elder brother and former ruler of Ula, included imperial sons-in-law and decorated officers.

Other Ula beile's clansmen produced several distinguished officials and nobles. The family of Nikan, a grandson of Budan who was the elder brother of Mantai and Bujantai, held the hereditary title of Viscount Second Class through military achievements. Other descendants of Buyan, Bujantai's grandfather also produced numerous military commanders and banner officials. Among them, Jalangga (查郎阿), Grand Secretary of the Wenhua Hall leading Qing's campaign against the Dzungars.

Another notable lineage descended from Ula beile's distant clansmen, whose son Fiyanggū become the Commander of the Capital Banner Infantry corp (步軍統領) and Minister of Imperial Guard (内大臣). Because his daughter became Empress Xiaojingxian, Fiyanggū and his ancestors were posthumously elevated to the rank of Duke First Class. His descendants continued to serve as high-ranking officials and banner commanders.

There were also other unrelated Ula Nara families to the beile's clan who served the Qing state, producing minor hereditary nobles and contributors to the creation of the Manchu script, such as Kara of Plain White Banner.
