= Wu Jingbin =

Chinese politician

- 烏靜彬
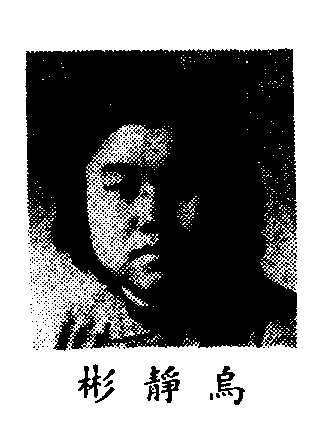

Member of the Legislative Yuan
- In office 1948–1963
- Constituency: Ching Setkhitu League

Personal details
- Born: 23 July 1914
- Died: 27 May 1975 (aged 60) Ürümqi, China
- Party: Kuomintang

Wu Jingbin (Chinese: 烏靜彬, 23 July 1914 – May 1990) was a Chinese politician. She was among the first group of women elected to the Legislative Yuan in 1948.

== Biography ==
Wu was born in 1914, the daughter of Mongolian prince and politician Gungsangnorbu. She married Manchukzabu in 1930. In 1935 she entered Ürümqi Girls' Middle School, where she became president of the student council. She also became a member of the Xinjiang Women’s Association and a committee member of the women's section of the Xinjiang People’s Anti-Imperial Union.

She joined the Kuomintang in 1942. In the 1948 elections for the Legislative Yuan, she was a candidate in the Ching Setkhitu League in Inner Mongolia and was elected to parliament. After being elected, she sat on the Border Policy and Education and Culture committees. She remained in China following the Chinese Civil War, and in 1951 was arrested and imprisoned during the Campaign to Suppress Counterrevolutionaries. After being released, she later served as secretary-general of the Xinjiang Uiygur Autonomous Region Chinese People's Political Consultative Conference. She died in Ürümqi in 1975.
