= Šušu Gioro =

Manchu clan and family name

Chinese name
- Chinese: 舒舒觉罗
Transcriptions
Standard Mandarin
- Hanyu Pinyin: shū shū jué luó shì

Manchu name
- Manchu script: ᡧᡠᡧᡠ ᡤᡳᠣᡵᠣ
- Möllendorff: Šušu Gioro

Pronunciation respelling name
- Pronunciation respelling: Shoo-shoo Ghee-ore-oh

Šušu Gioro is one of the branches of the prominent Gioro clan of the Manchus. Its members were historically distributed across Yehe, Hada, Foala, Uingga, Neyen River, Yarhu, Wanggiyan, Wengelor City, Suwan, Jakumu, and other places in Manchuria. Following the fall of the Qing dynasty, descendants commonly adopted Chinese surnames such as Zhao, Shu, Zeng, Gong, Cong, Qian, Jiang, Ren, and She.

== Overview ==
Several branches of the Šušu Gioro clan held hereditary titles and produced banner officials and military officers. Families residing in Yehe and Hada were particularly prominent. Members of the clan distinguished themselves in campaigns against the Ming dynasty, the Revolt of the Three Feudatories, and the Dzungars, receiving hereditary ranks baitalabure hafan and tuwašara hafan.

Among the notable figures was Kulahai, who served the Qing court from childhood under Hong Taiji and later became Minister of the Imperial Stud. Another distinguished member was Jaisan (介山), son of Fadu, who participated in suppressing the Revolt of the Three Feudatories and subsequently served as Ministers of Justice, Personnel, and rites. Some sources also recorded the Third Class Viscount Turusi as a member of the Šušu Gioro clan.

Throughout the Qing period, members of the clan served as banner commanders, imperial guards, and civil officials, while many clansmen inherited military ranks and distinguished themselves in imperial campaigns.

== Males ==
- Mingde (明德), served as fifth rank literary official (员外郎)

== Females ==
Princess Consort

- Secondary Consort
  - Yunti's secondary consort, the mother of Hongchun (1703–1739), Princess (1705–1729), Lady (1706–1761) and Princess (1707–1776)
- Concubine
  - Changning's concubine, the mother of Manduhu (1674–1731) and fifth daughter (1677 – 1678 or 1679)
