= Namdulu =

Manchu clan and family name

Manchu name
- Manchu script: ᠨᠠᠮᡩᡠ᠋ᠯᡠ

Chinese name
- Chinese: 那木都鲁氏
Transcriptions
Standard Mandarin
- Hanyu Pinyin: nà mù dū lǔ shì

Pronunciation respelling name
- Pronunciation respelling: NAHM-doo-loo

Namdulu is one of the clans of Manchu nobility descending from the modern day Ussuriysk area. The clan inhabited the Changbai mountains, Huichun valley, Jihe, Warka and Hada. When Namdulu clan was on the verge of extinction, most of the descendants of Hada Nara clan were adopted into the Hada kin. After the demise of the Qing dynasty, modern day descendants of the Namdulu clan changed their surnames into Na (那), Nan (南), Fu (傅) and Shen (沈)

== Notable figures ==
=== Males ===
- Kangwuli (康武理) served as one of the 16 ministers of Nurhaci
  - Laita (赖塔), a defector of the rebellion of Li Zicheng and first class duke Baoji (一等褒绩公)
- Yuehai (岳海), fourth rank literary official
- Yong'an (永安), served as second rank military official.
- Shishun (侍顺), third class baron
  - Enpu (恩扑)
    - Wenxi (文熙)，adopted by his uncle Enchong
- Xianfu (县富)

Prince Consorts
Year	Prince	Princess	Issue
3 January 1843	Enchong	Princess Shouzang of the Second Rank	
August 1856	Wenxi	Zaidun's fourth daughter	
