= Sakda =

Manchu clan and family name

Chinese name
- Chinese: 萨克达
Transcriptions
Standard Mandarin
- Hanyu Pinyin: sà kè dá shì

Manchu name
- Manchu script: ᠰᠠᡴ᠋ᡩᠠ
- Möllendorff: Sakda

Pronunciation respelling name
- Pronunciation respelling: SAHK-dah

Sakda is a clan of Manchu nobility during Qing dynasty. The clan originally belonged to the Bordered Blue Banner. Later, the family was transferred into the Bordered Yellow Banner. Their ancestral home was located in Sakda valley, later expanded to Warka and Hada by two brothers : Chulu and Lilai. By the founding of Later Jin, the clan had been ruling territories ranging from Changbai Mountains, Ningguta to Amur region. After the demise of last Chinese dynasty, modern day descendants changed their surnames into: Li (里/礼), Cha (查), Ma (麻), Cang (苍) and Luo (骆).

== Notable figures ==
=== Males ===
- Chulu (初率)
- Lilai (里来), held a title of second class qingche duwei, enfeoffed as third class baron (三等男) for military achievements and one of 16 ministers
  - Xiteku (西特库), held a title of first class baron (一等男), Lilai's grandson
    - Mahali (玛哈理), supervisor of imperial tombs, Xiteku's son
    - Shubao (舒保), held a title of baron
- Shusai (舒赛), a captain (左领)
  - Xilanyin (西兰因), awarded a title of third class qingche duwei for conquering Henan and Jiangnan
  - Mandu (满都), Alan's son （阿兰)
- Huase (华塞)
- Asiha (阿思哈; 1710–1776), a Grand Secretary of Inner Court and Governor of Jiangnan
- Mingshan (明山)
  - Qichang (棋昌）
    - Futai (富泰）- fourth rank literary official (少卿；pinyin:shaoqing) in the Court of Imperial Sacrifices and held a title of duke (公)
      - Demao (德懋)

=== Females ===
Imperial Consort

- Empress
  - Empress Xiaodexian (1831–1850), the Xianfeng Emperor's primary consort

Princess Consort

- Concubine
  - Changning's concubine, the mother of Duiqing'e (1681–1742), Zhuotai (1683–1705) and seventh daughter (1686–1687)
