= Hitara =

Manchu clan and family name

Manchu name
- Manchu script: ᡥᡳᡨ᠋ᠠᡵᠠ

Chinese name
- Chinese: 喜塔腊氏
Transcriptions
Standard Mandarin
- Hanyu Pinyin: xǐ tǎ là shì

Pronunciation respelling name
- Pronunciation respelling: HEE-tah-rah

Hitara, earlier known as Hitan (溪滩氏), was a clan of Manchu nobility belonging to the Manchu Plain White Banner. Due to the marriage of Empress Xuan to the Jurchen chieftain Taksi, the clan was called "Old Maiden House". Their ancestral homes were located in the Changbai Mountains, Niyaman Mountains and Dong'e valley, from the beginning of Ming dynasty. After the demise of the Qing dynasty, descendants of this clan changed their surnames to Zhao (赵), Tu (图), Wen (文), Qi (祁/齐), Kei (祁), Sun (孙), Zhu (祝), Xi (希/喜/奚), Liu (刘), Xian (线) and other names.

== Notable figures ==
=== Males ===
- Anggoduli Gayan
- Bayan (巴颜)
  - Jindou (金都)
    - Gudou (古都), father of Empress Zhi
      - Cancha (参察)
        - A'gu (阿古), father of Empress Xuan
- Sabitu (萨璧图)
- Kuli(库理)
- Laibao (来保), a member of Grand Council of State, a secretary in the Ministry of Public Works and a Grand Secretary of Wuying hall
- Chang'an (常安)
  - He'erjing'e (和爾經額/和尔经额), served as a second rank literary official (總管/总管, pinyin:zongguan) in the Imperial Household Department and a second rank military official (副都統/副都统，pinyin: fudutong), and held the title of a third class Cheng'en duke (三等公)
    - Shengzhu (盛住)
    - Mengzhu (孟住)
- Yulu (裕禄), served as second class military official and governor of Anhui.
  - Xichen (熙臣)
  - Xiyuan (熙元), served as a Shujishi in 1889

==== Prince Consorts ====
Year	Prince	Princess	Issue
	Chongduan	Zaitong, Yihui's third daughter by Gu Taiqing	

=== Females ===
Imperial Consorts

- Empress
  - Empress Xuan（？-1569), mother of Emperor Taizu of Qing, the founding khan of the Jurchen-led Later Jin dynasty；grandmother of Emperor Taizong of Qing, who was the second khan of the Later Jin dynasty and the founding emperor of the Qing dynasty.
  - Empress Xiaoshurui (1760–1797), the Jiaqing Emperor's first empress, the mother of second daughter (1780–1783), the Daoguang Emperor (1782–1850) and Princess Zhuangjing (1784–1811)

== Gallery ==
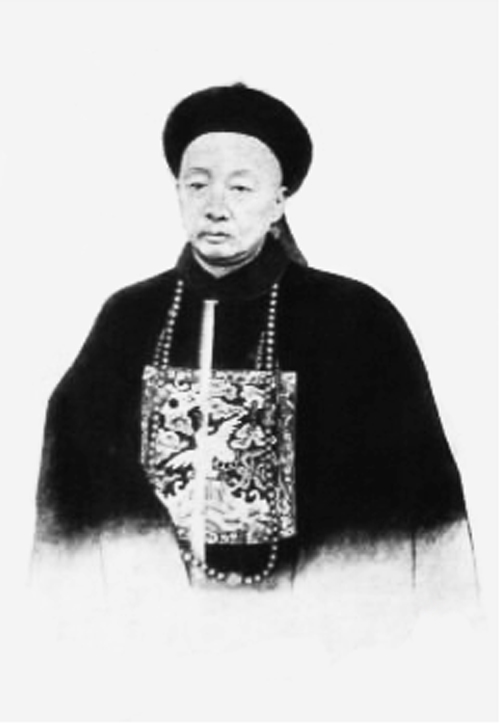
Yulu, a Governor of Anhui

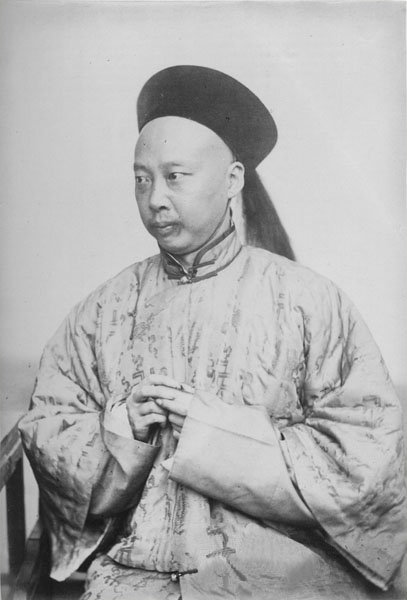
A photograph of Yulu

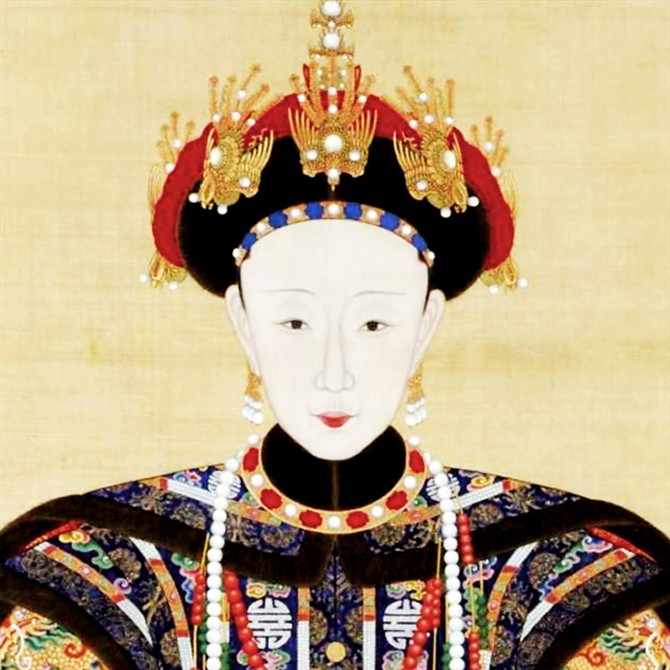
Empress Xiaoshurui

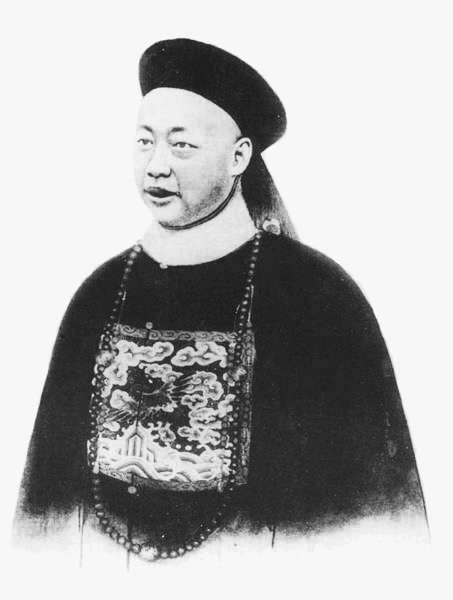
Hitara Xiyuan, Yulu's son and professor in Hanlin academy
