= Wāng =

Chinese surname

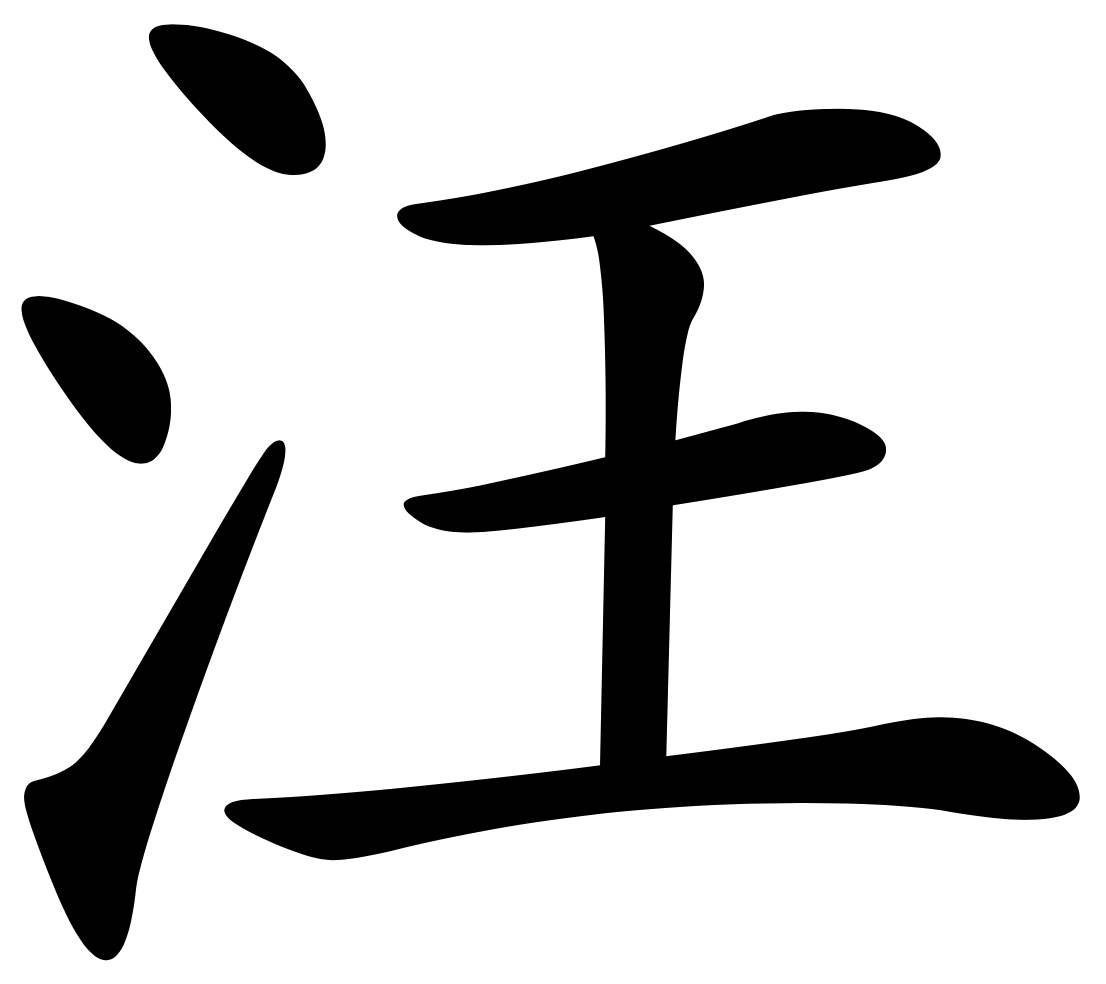
- Romanisation: Wang (Wāng), Waung, Wong, Vong

Origin
- Language: Chinese
- Meaning: "deep" "puddle" (archaic)

Wāng (汪) is a Chinese surname. It was 104th of the Hundred Family Surnames poem, contained in the verse Yáo, Shào, Zhàn, Wāng (姚邵湛汪). In 2013, the Fuxi Cultural Association found the name to be the 60th most common in China, being shared by around 4.83 million people or 0.360% of the population, with the province with the largest population being Anhui. A study of the 2020 census found it to be the 59th most common surname in mainland China.

It is also Wong in Cantonese, Ong or Ang in Hokkien, Waung or Vong in American English, and Ō or Oh in Japanese. However, in Vietnamese, it is written Uông. Wāng was listed by a 2007 NCIIS survey as the 58th most common surname in mainland China and by Yang Xuxian as the 76th most common surname in Taiwan.

== Origins ==
汪 means "vast" in the Chinese language, and is often used to describe oceans. In the modern vernacular Chinese, it is also the onomatopoeia for the sound of a barking dog. Baxter and Sagart reconstructed it as *qʷˤaŋ and 'wang, respectively.

1. It was originally a shortening of Wang Mang (汪芒), or Wang Wang (汪罔), name of a state in present-day Deqing County, Zhejiang. After it was conquered by a neighboring state, its inhabitants fled and the surname was shortened to Wang (汪).
2. The name is derived from the ancestral surname Jiang (姜).

=== Chinese Muslims ===
Unlike other Hui people who claim foreign descent, Hui in Gansu with the surname Wāng are descended from Han Chinese who converted to Islam and married Hui or Dongxiang people.

A town called Tangwangchuan in Gansu had a multi-ethnic populace, the Tang (唐) and Wāng families predominating. The Tang and Wang families were originally of non-Muslim Han extraction, but by the Twentieth Century some branches of the families had become Muslim by intermarriage or conversion.

== Notable people ==
- Cecilia Wang (汪詩詩/汪诗诗; born 1981), Hong Kong model
- Wang Chaoqun (汪超群; born 1942) is a retired lieutenant general of the People's Liberation Army Air Force (PLAAF) of China
- Chloe Bennet, (汪可盈; born 1992 as Chloé Wang), American actress and singer
- John Clang (汪春龍/汪春龙; born 1973 as Ang Choon Leng), American-based Singaporean artist
- Wang Daohan (汪道涵; 1915–2005), Chinese diplomat and co-negotiator of the 1992 Consensus
- Consort Dun (惇妃; 27 March 1746 - 6 March 1806), Consort of the Qianlong Emperor and mother of Princess Hexiao of the First Rank
- Wang Dayuan (Chinese: 汪大渊/汪大渊; born 1311–1350) traveller from Quanzhou during the Mongol Yuan Dynasty in the 14th century
- Wang Daxie (汪大燮; born 1860–1929) Chinese politician, served as Premier of the Republic of China twice
- Wang Dazhi (汪達之/汪达之; 1903–1980), Chinese educator
- Wang Deyao (汪德耀; 1903–2000), Chinese cell biologist
- Wang Dezhao (汪德昭; born 1905–1998) Chinese physicist
- Wang Dongxing (汪東興/汪东兴; 1916–2015), Chinese military commander and politician
- Wang Fang (汪芳; pen name Fang Fang, born 1955), Chinese author
- Wang Feng (汪峯/汪峰; born 1971), Chinese rock musician and composer
- Frank Wang (汪滔; born 1980), Chinese engineer, entrepreneur, founder and CEO of DJI
- Wang Guozhen (汪国真/汪國真; 1956–2015) Chinese poet
- Wang Haijian (汪海健; born 2000), Chinese footballer
- Wang Haijiang (汪海江; born 1963) lieutenant general of the People's Liberation Army (PLA)
- Wang Hao (汪皓; born 1992) Gold medalist diver for 2011 World Aquatics Championships
- Wang Han (汪涵; born 1974), Chinese television variety show host
- Helen Kay Wang (née Below; (汪海嵐/汪海岚); born 1965), English sinologist and translator
- Wang Hui (汪暉/汪晖; born 1959), Chinese professor in the Department of Chinese Language and Literature, Tsinghua University
- Wang Huimin (汪慧敏; born 1992) female Chinese volleyball player
- Wang Huizu (汪輝祖/汪辉祖), Chinese jurist.
- Ignatius C. Wang (汪中璋), Auxiliary Bishop of San Francisco in 2002-2009
- Irene Wang (汪圓圓/汪圆圆; born 1986), Hong Kong model and actress
- Wang Jiajie (汪佳捷; born 1988), Chinese footballer
- Wang Jianan (汪佳男; born 1983) Congolese table tennis player
- Wang Jian (汪建; born 1954) Chinese geneticist, businessman, Chairman, and co-founder of the BGI Group
- Jianping Wang (汪建平), Chinese computer scientist
- Wang Jianwei (汪健偉/汪健伟; born 1958) New media, performance, and installation artist based in Beijing
- Wang Jing (汪靜/汪静; born 1971) Chinese sprint canoeist
- Wang Jingwei (汪精衞/汪精卫; 1883–1944) Chinese politician, former Kuomintang officer and later Japanese collaborator
- Wang Jinxian (汪晉賢/汪晋贤; born 1996), Chinese footballer
- Jiro Wang (汪東城/汪东城; born 1981), Taiwanese singer and actor
- Wang Juan (汪涓; born 1975) Chinese Paralympian athlete
- Liza Wang (汪明荃; born 1947), Hong Kong diva, actress, MC
- Wang Maozu (汪懋祖; born 1891–1949) educationist and philosopher
- Wang Min (Chinese: 汪敏; born 1990) Chinese rower
- Wang Ming-hui (汪明輝/汪明辉; born 1985) Taiwanese rower
- Wang Ping (汪萍; born 1953) retired Taiwanese film actress
- Wang Pinxian (汪平先; born 1936) Chinese marine geologist
- Wang Qiang (汪強/汪强; born 1984), Chinese international footballer
- Wang Qiao (汪喬/汪乔, birthdate unknown), courtesy name Zongjing, painter who lived in Qing dynasty China.
- Wang Qingqing (汪清清; born 1991) Chinese champion Renju player
- Wang Qunbin (汪群斌born 1969) Chinese billionaire, businessman, co-chairman of Fosun International
- Wang Quan (汪泉; born 1989) Chinese footballer
- Wang Shun (汪順/汪顺; born 1994), Chinese competitive swimmer
- Silence Wang (汪蘇瀧/汪苏泷; born 1989), Chinese pop singer-songwriter and record producer
- Wang Song (汪嵩; born 1983), Chinese footballer
- Wang Tao (汪濤/汪涛; born 1962), Chinese–British archaeologist and art historian specialising in early Chinese art
- Wang Tao (汪濤/汪涛), Chinese economist
- Lihong V. Wang (Chinese: 汪立宏) Bren Professor of Medical Engineering and Electrical Engineering at the Andrew and Peggy Cherng Department of Medical Engineering at California Institute of Technology
- Wang Weifan (汪維藩/汪维藩; 1927-2015), Chinese evangelical Christian leader of the state-sanctioned
- Wang Wusheng (汪蕪生/汪芜生; born 1945–2018) Chinese photographer known black-and-white photographs of Mount Huangshan
- Wang Xiaofeng (汪嘯風/汪啸风; born 1944), Chinese retired politician
- Wang Xibang (汪西邦; born 1925–2015) contemporary Chinese painter, calligrapher, poet, educator, antique collector.
- Wang Xin (汪鑫; born 1985) Chinese badminton player, former World No. 1 women's singles player
- Xu-Jia Wang (汪徐家; born 1963) Chinese-Australian mathematician and professor of mathematics at Australian National University
- Wang Yang (汪洋; born 1955), Chinese retired politician
- Wang Yongchen (汪永晨; born 1954) Senior Environment Reporter for China National Radio, founder of Green Earth Volunteers
- Wang You (汪猷; 1910–1997), Chinese biochemist, pioneer of antibiotics and biochemistry studies in China
- Wang Yuhao (汪宇豪; born 1996) Chinese footballer
- Xu Yulan (汪玉蘭/汪玉兰; born Wang Yulan, 1921 – 2017), Yue opera singer-actress
- Wang Zengqi (汪曾祺; born 1920–1997) contemporary Chinese writer
- Wang Zhong (汪中; born 1745–1794) Qing-dynasty scholar from Jiangdu District in Yangzhou
- Wang Zili (汪自力; born 1968) retired Chinese chess player
