= Wang Qiao =

Wang Qiao may refer to:

- Wang Qiao (engineer)
- Wang Qiao (footballer)
- Wang Qiao (painter)
