= Hexia Ancient Town =

Ancient town in Jiangsu, China

Hexia Ancient Town is an ancient town located in Hexia Community, Hexia Subdistrict, in the northwestern part of Huai’an District, Huai’an City, Jiangsu Province. During the Qing dynasty and the Republic of China, Hexia Ancient Town comprised an area formed by three adjacent towns—Xiangwan Town, Meili Town, and Hexia Town. In the Ming and Qing dynasties, Hexia Town prospered as a major hub for grain transport on the Beijing–Hangzhou Grand Canal and as a distribution center for Huai salt. At its height, it was praised with the saying, “The thousand-year splendor of Yangzhou may be found anew at Xihu Zui,” reflecting its remarkable prosperity. In 1950, Xiangwan Town, Meili Town, and Hexia Town were merged to form the new Hexia Town.

In modern times, the streets of Hexia Ancient Town have largely preserved the architectural style of the Ming and Qing dynasties. In May 2006 [1], Hexia Ancient Town was designated as part of the sixth batch of National Key Cultural Relics Protection Units, as a sub-item of the Beijing–Hangzhou Grand Canal in Huai’an City (later incorporated into the Grand Canal listing in 2013).

Hexia Ancient Town adjoins Fuma Lane. Notable historical figures associated with the area include Shen Kun, Wu Cheng’en, Cheng Silì, and Cheng Jinfang, among others.

== Administrative evolution ==
Historically, the northeastern part of Hexia Ancient Town belonged to Xiangwan Town, the southern part to Meili Town, and the western part to Hexia Town. Hexia Ancient Town is situated on the right bank of the Shanyang Bend of the ancient Huai River. At the top of this bend was a small river inlet known as Xiangjia Bay. The primitive market settlement that emerged there was also called Xiangjia Bay, which represents the earliest known place name of Hexia Ancient Town. Xiangjia Bay later evolved into Xiangwan Street and subsequently into Xiangwan Town. Meili Town was the hometown of Mei Cheng and his son Mei Gao of the Western Han dynasty and was historically known as Ancient Meili.

In the thirteenth year of the Yongle reign of the Ming dynasty (1415), Chen Xuan excavated the Qingjiangpu Canal, linking it with the Inner Grand Canal. As a result, waterborne transportation—primarily grain transport—was rerouted to the southern part of the ancient town. This area thus became a strategic hub for canal transport and developed into a commercial port. The term Huzui (“lake mouth”) of Guanji Lake emerged as a regional place name during this period. After the ancient Huai River officially ceased flowing, the former Huai River channel north of Hexia Ancient Town became a major route for transporting salt and firewood, turning the area into a national center of the salt industry and a major distribution hub for Huai salt.

The origin of the name “Hexia” has several explanations. One view holds that the town lies downstream of the Huai River and was therefore called Hexia (“below the river”); another suggests that since the town lies south of the great rivers (the Yellow River and the Huai River), with north regarded as “upper” and south as “lower,” it was named Hexia; a third explanation proposes that the town's ground level was lower than the riverbed, giving rise to the name Hexia (“the river above, the town below”). Yet another theory links the name to salt administration practices of the time, in which officials spoke of “going upriver” (Shang Hebei) and “going down to Hexia” (Qu Hexia), from which the name Hexia emerged.

During the period of the Republic of China on the mainland, Hexia Ancient Town consisted of the three small towns of Xiangwan, Meili, and Hexia. In 1950, shortly after the founding of the People's Republic of China, these three towns were merged to form Hexia Town. In the contemporary administrative system, Hexia Ancient Town is part of Hexia Community under Hexia Subdistrict.

== History ==
=== Prosperity ===
During the Ming and Qing dynasties, Hexia—located outside the West Gate of the new city of Huai’an Prefecture—served as a storage and distribution center for gang salt (tribute salt). Salt produced along the northern Jiangsu coast was inspected here before being transported and sold to the Yangtze River and Huai River regions, including present-day Hubei, Hunan, Jiangxi, Anhui, Henan, and Jiangsu provinces. Collectively, this salt was known as Huai salt. As a result, the area bustled with people and commerce flourished.

Historically, control of the salt trade in the early Ming dynasty lay with Shanxi merchants. From the mid-Ming period onward, they were gradually replaced by Huizhou merchants. Among the most prominent were members of the Cheng clan from Censhan Ferry in Shexian County, Huizhou Prefecture, who were described as being “all extremely wealthy”, giving rise to the saying that “the various branches of the Cheng family competed to amass wealth through salt licenses” . Cheng Dagong had already entered the Huai’an salt trade by the late Ming period. By the early Qing dynasty, all thirteen major salt merchant households in Hexia belonged to powerful Cheng lineages from Shexian, Huizhou. Their trading houses included the Gong (or Gong) Shop, Geng Shop, Da Shop, Ren Shop, Wu Shop, He Shop, Wu (Five) Shop, Ban Shop, and others . These shop names were derived from components of the owners’ personal names. For example, the Wu (Five) Shop of Cheng Liangyue was named after his father, Shenwu Gong, and left behind place names such as Wu Shop Lane, Ren Shop Lane, Wen Shop Lane, and Geng Shop Lane .

After amassing great wealth, the Cheng family built 24 gardens, accounting for one-third of Hexia's total of 65 gardens. These included the Dizhung (Dizhuang) built by Cheng Jian at Xiaohu Lake, the Liuyi Garden of Cheng Jun, and the Gupu Qu Garden of Cheng Silì. Cheng Jinfang also constructed the Guiyi residence in Huai’an, which housed a private library containing tens of thousands of volumes.

=== Decline ===
In the twelfth year of the Daoguang reign (1832), the reform of the salt administration system replaced the gang salt system with the ticket salt system. As a result, salt merchants in Hexia gradually shifted their businesses elsewhere, leading to a sharp decline in income. The grand mansions of salt merchants and the gardens around Xiaohu Lake quickly fell into disrepair, with many reduced to ruins and vegetable plots. Contemporary accounts vividly described the scene: “Tiles like scales, rats scurrying, crows roosting on tattered curtains; dance pavilions collapsed, spider webs hanging,” and “gardens demolished and leveled into vegetable fields,” lamenting that “famed gardens of over a hundred years were destroyed within less than a month”. Other descriptions spoke of “desolate plots planted with chives and scallions” and “lush weeds where autumn phosphorus flickers.”

In the tenth year of the Xianfeng reign (1860), the Gengshen Catastrophe occurred, when the Nian Army captured and burned Qingjiangpu, Banzha, and Hexia. In Hexia, eight or nine out of every ten market buildings were destroyed, and three or four out of every ten residential houses were lost. In the aftermath of this calamity, the devastation was profound, as captured in poetry: “From the flames of plunder only a lone mound remains, heaven leaving a remnant for idle wandering; heartbroken, the paired swallows beyond the curtain mistake it for the painted towers of former days.” Another lament read, “Centuries-old famed sights turned to scorched earth; broken wells and crumbling walls bathed in the slanting sunset”.

=== Contemporary era ===
In modern times, the streets of Hexia Ancient Town have largely preserved the architectural style of the Ming and Qing dynasties. More than 80 percent of the residential buildings are brick-and-timber structures dating from before the Republican period, and over 70 percent were built before the Qing dynasty. Stone-paved roads account for about 90 percent of the street surfaces. Some buildings have undergone restoration due to their great age. On May 25, 2006, Hexia Ancient Town was designated as part of the sixth batch of National Key Cultural Relics Protection Units, as a sub-item of the Beijing–Hangzhou Grand Canal in Huai’an City (later incorporated into the Grand Canal listing in 2013).

Since 2021, Hexia Ancient Town has participated in the construction of the “Hundred-Mile Grand Canal Gallery” project. Efforts have focused on balancing preservation and revitalization, restoring various cultural heritage sites, and strengthening the integrated protection and adaptive reuse of historic buildings and old streets.

== Attractions ==
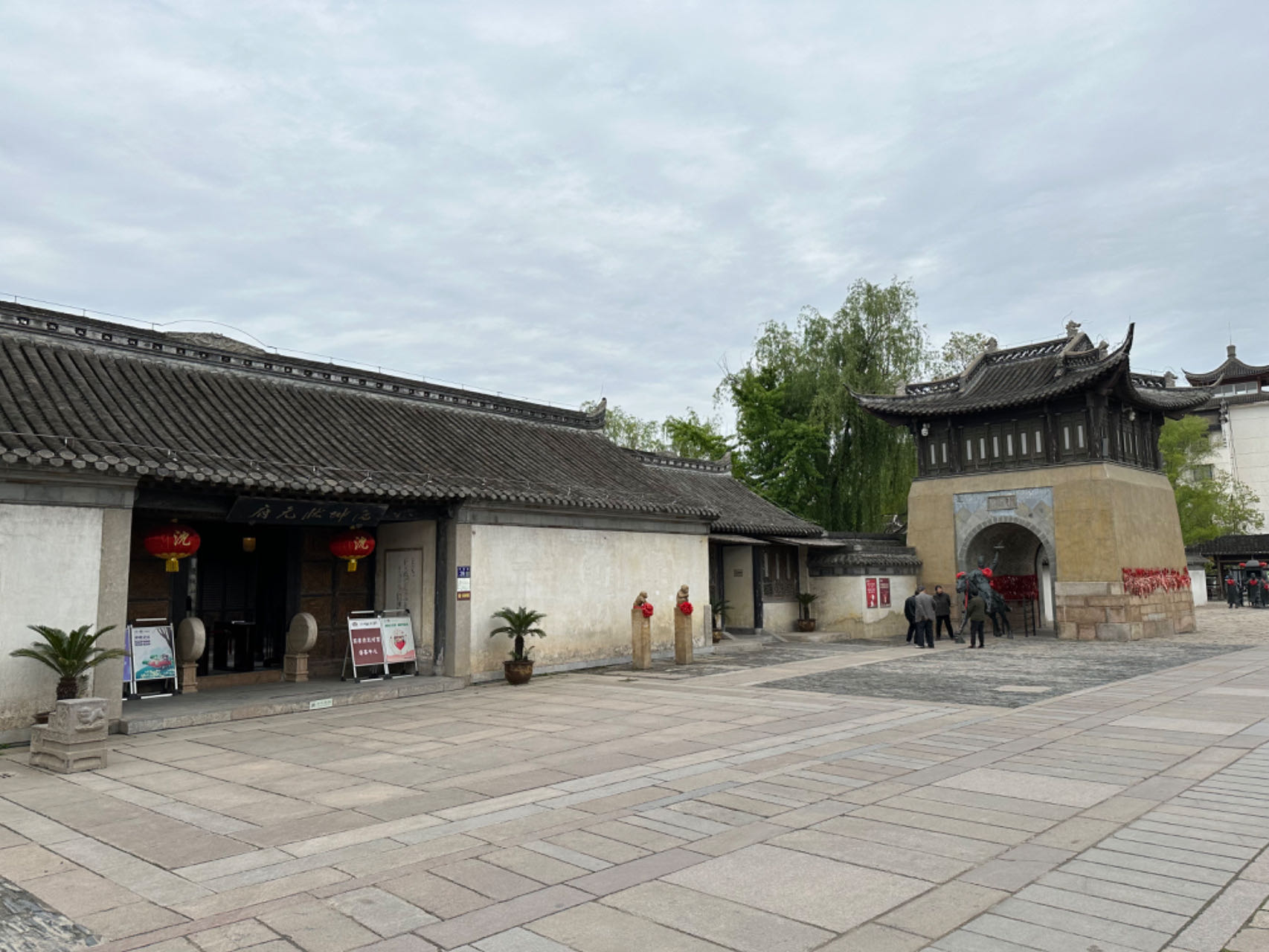
The southern gate and Zhuangyuan Tower of the Shen Kun Zhuangyuan Residence, photographed in 2023.

In addition to sites designated as cultural relics protection units at various levels, Hexia Community is home to attractions such as the Shen Kun Zhuangyuan Residence – Yuyuan Garden (reconstructed) and Xiaohu Lake.

Cultural Relics Protection Units at Various Levels

name	number	classification	era	districts	address	announcement	picture
National Key Cultural Relics Protection Unit
Grand Canal - Huai'an Section: Hexia Ancient Town; Ancient Canal Stone Embankment; Pei Yinsen's Former Residence	6-810	ancient buildings	Hexia Community, Hexia Subdistrict; Hexia Community, Hexia Subdistrict; No. 30 Jiangqiao Lane, Hexia Community, Hexia Street	Ming , Qing , Spring and Autumn Period			
Jiangsu Provincial Cultural Relics Protection Unit
Huai'an City Cultural Relics Protection Unit
Liang Hongyu Ancestral Hall	1-		West side of Xiangyu Avenue	clear			
Wu Cheng'en's Former Residence	1-		No. 12, Datong Lane	Ming and Qing Dynasties			
Han Hou Fishing Platform	2-		Komura Street	Ming and Qing Dynasties			
Hexia Stone Slab Street	2-						
Jiangning Guild Hall	2-		Zhongjie	clear			
Meiting	2-		At the north end of Meili Street, on the west bank of Xiaohu Lake				
Tomb of Wanda	2-		Xiaohu Lake near Tongji Bridge on Lianhua Street				
Tomb of Zuo Baogui	2-		Luojiaqiao West Embankment River East Bank				
Hexia Mosque	3-		Luojiaqiao South Mosque Lane				
Qin Juren's Residence	3-		No. 97 Tea Lane				
Xu's Traditional Chinese Medicine Residence	3-		No. 154, West Section of Guyi Street				
Wenlou	3-		No. 67 Huaxiang Street				
Wensi Temple Ruins	4-		South end of Huzui Street				
Wu Jutong Traditional Chinese Medicine Clinic	4-		No. 71 Huzui Street				
Hexia Sanguan Temple	4-		South of the western end of Guyi Street, east of Chaxiang Alley				
Former site of Fuxingzhai Halal Restaurant	4-		No. 126 Huzui Street				
