= Wang Chung =

Wang Chung may refer to:

- Wang Chung (band), an English new wave band
- Wang Chong (27–97 AD), or Wang Ch'ung in Wade–Giles, a Han dynasty Chinese philosopher
- Wang Zhong (Three Kingdoms) (died 242), or Wang Chung in Wade–Giles, general of the Cao Wei state in the Three Kingdoms period
- Wang Zhong (Ming dynasty) (1359–1409), a marquis
- Wang Zhong (Qing dynasty) (1745–1794), a Confucian scholar

== See also ==
- Wang Chong (director) (born 1982), Chinese theatre director and translator
- Wang Zhong (disambiguation)
