= Wang Zhong =

Wang Zhong (or Wang Chung in Wade–Giles) may refer to:

- Wang Zhong (Three Kingdoms), general of the Cao Wei state in the Three Kingdoms period
- Wang Zhong (Ming dynasty) (1359-1409), a marquis
- Wang Zhong (Qing dynasty) (1745-1794), a Confucian scholar
- Wang Zhong, a chinese mountaineer who died on 2026 Broad Peak avalanche in 30 July 2026

== See also ==
- Wang Chong (27–97 AD), a Han dynasty Chinese philosopher
- Wang Chung (disambiguation)
