= Wang Huizu =

Qing scholar-official

Wang Huizu (汪輝祖; 1731–1807; courtesy name Xuanzeng 煥曾; art name Longzhuang 龍莊) was a scholar-official, jurist, historian and moralist in Qing dynasty China. He was a commentator on social and local governance issues, and he was also an administrator who preached benevolence in judicial affairs.

== Early life ==
Wang Huizu was born on 21 January 1731 in Xiaoshan county, Shaoxing circuit, Zhejiang (present-day Xiaoshan, Hangzhou). Situated in the lower Yangtze valley, this region was marked by the presence of Jiangnan, a city which was the center of Chinese literacy and an intellectually flourishing area. Wang Huizu's father, Wang Kai (汪楷), was the warden of a prison in Henan. Wang's mother was Kai's concubine. Therefore, it could be said that Wang Huizu belonged to the local literati elite. However, Wang Kai died in Canton in 1741, putting Wang Huizu and his mother in a precarious situation. As a result, the young Wang was forced to struggle in poverty.

== Life and career as an official ==
In 1747, at the age of sixteen, Wang Huizu passed the local-level examination and therefore gained the status of shengyuan (生員; "student member"). He taught at school in the wake of this success and married in 1749. Thank to his new status, he became in 1752 the private secretary of Wang Zongmin, his father-in-law who was a district magistrate. Wang Huizu specialized into judicial affairs, which was the most lucrative choice for a private secretary. He continued to work as a secretary in judicial matters for thirty-four years, serving sixteen different officials in the provinces of Zhejiang and Jiangsu.

In 1768, Wang Huizu completed the Provincial level exam – after having failed eight times – which gave him the status of juren (舉人; "elevated man"). After three aborted attempts, he finally passed the highest level of the Imperial Examination in 1775, reaching the status of jinshi (進士; "presented scholar").

This new status allowed him to be appointed magistrate of the district of Ningyuan County in Hunan province in 1786. He was re-appointed magistrate in 1788 in the neighboring district of Xintian, and re-appointed again in Daozhou in 1790, also in Hunan. He was dismissed from his post in 1791 because of what he presented in his autobiography as an intrigue against him. In fact, Wang was asked by his superiors to examine four human skeletons in the county of Guiyang, but he didn't find the requisite medical examiner in the allotted time, which offered a reason to the provincial magistrate to dismiss Wang Huizu from his employ. Afterwards, he remained for a moment in Changsha but finally retired in his home district in 1793 where he focused on his work as a scholar.

Wang Huizu became paralyzed in 1795 and died on the first of May 1807.

== Scholarship ==
=== As jurist ===
Wang Huizu wrote two guides of public administration which had become paramount for Chinese officials until the end of the Qing empire. The first one, Zuozhi yaoyan (佐治藥言) was printed in 1785 by Wang's friend Bao Tingbo (鮑廷博). The second, Xuezhi yishuo (學治臆說; "Views on Learning Governance"), was published in 1793. In this second piece, Wang focused on county government and compared county magistrates to medicine men, wooden puppets or fragile glass screens: all these evocative comparisons reflect the officials' inability to manage an economically and demographically expanding society. Wang Huizu even stated in the preface of his book that he would make a critical study on the routine of Chinese local administrators. He expressed the idea that the scholar is much closer to the people than the administrator and that the official should rely on scholars if he wants to act efficiently, notably regarding the diffusion of Confucian moral values. He also underlined the importance of the hearing of people's plaints as one of the key for a good governance, notably because this activity creates a direct link between the magistrate and the civilians under his jurisdiction. In that respect, Wang Huizu thinks that magistrates should comment on plaints in public session rather than in private session in order to be heard by the community and to prevent the same trouble from coming back.

Wang's work has been very influential for all the Chinese officials after him, there is no denying that his guides have a significant moral dimension. For instance, Wang advocates a compassionate vision of justice. He notably gives the counterexample of a particularly strict magistrate named Zhang, who sentenced a cheater at the civil service examinations to be cangued publicly. The accused asked for his sentence to be adjourned because of the examinations. As the magistrate refused, the cheater's bride committed suicide, and when the young man was released, he committed suicide as well. Therefore, Wang concludes that sentences should be softened by the principle of human compassion (情).

=== As historian ===
Wang Huizu developed, throughout his life, a strong interest in history. His originality as an historian arose from his understanding of the importance of practical devices – like indices – as historical tools. His taste for history might have been inspired by the Hanshu (the official history of the Former Han dynasty), which Wang bought in 1769 in Beijing. His quite modest social origins may have precluded him from historical studies at a younger age. Following this first purchase, Wang bought copies of all the other Twenty-Four Histories of dynastic China and compiled all the biographies encountered in these texts into an index in sixty-four volumes. Published in 1783, this index – titled Shixing yunbian (史姓韻編) – became vital for the study of Chinese history during the Qing era. He supplemented this voluminous work with two additional indices titled Jiushi tong xingming lüe (九史同姓名略) and Liao–Jin–Yuan sanshi tong xingming lu (寮金元三史同姓名錄), both dealing with homoanthroponyms found in the Twenty-Four Histories. They were respectively printed in 1790 and 1801. Between 1796 and 1800, Wang Huizu worked on Yuanshi benzheng (元史本證), an historical criticism of the Yuan shi.

=== Autobiography ===
In 1795, Wang Huizu began to write his autobiography titled Bingta menghen lu (病榻夢痕錄; "Traces of Dreams from a Sick Bed"). He first published it in 1796 but continued to enrich it regularly until 1806 and his sons even continued to fill it in after their father's death. This autogiography provides information on the life of the literati class in China but also on public administration, notably Wang's role as a magistrate. His text advocates for mediation in the resolution of conflicts rather than lawsuits. In the sphere of formal adjudication, Wang Huizu records that when he was in Ningyuan county in 1787, out of the two hundred plaints he received each day, only ten usually led to a formal lawsuit. This shows that, in a majority of cases, arbitrage was used to ensure civil justice— a convenient means to maintain social peace.

Although many literati produced works of belles-lettres and especially poetry, this was not the case for Wang Huizu. However, he was in contact with other Chinese scholars such as the historian Zhang Xuecheng and Zhu Yun – who originated the Siku Quanshu under the Qianlong Emperor – Shao Jinhan (邵晉涵), Lu Jiugao (魯九皋), and the bibliophile Bao Tingbo.

=== As moralist ===
Wang Huizu was also a moralist, notably producing a handbook for the management of family life called Shuangjietang yongxun (雙節堂庸訓; "Simple Precepts from the Hall of Chaste Widows"). Wang wrote that the two women who inspired his model of the virtuous, chaste wife were his mother and his father's second wife. The book was dedicated to educating his sons as future patriarchs. He underlines that the equilibrium of a family, especially the virtue of its women, depends on the zunzhang yueshu (尊長約束; "family elder's discipline").
