= Zhu Yun =

Qing Chinese scholar and official

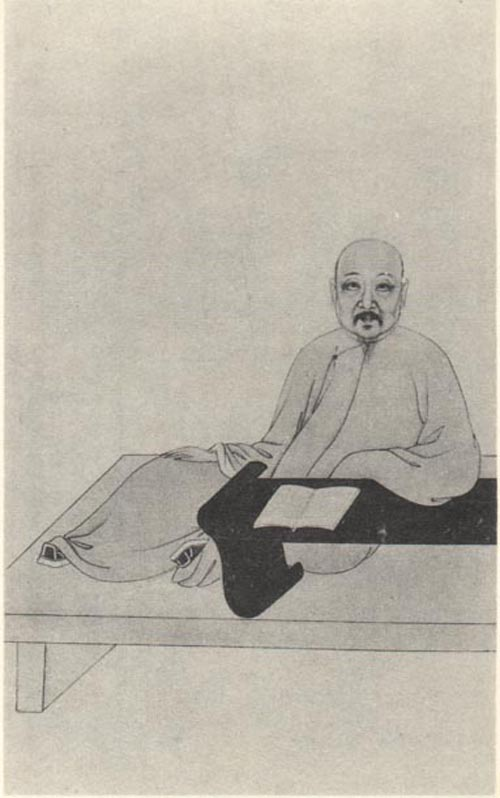
Portrait of Zhu Yun

Zhu Yun (Chinese: 朱筠; 1729–1781) was a Qing scholar and official who had profound influence on the Siku Quanshu (Imperial Library in Four Treasures) project and academia of the time.

== Life ==
Originally, the Zhu family hailed from the city of Hangzhou, but after Zhu's grandfather chose to retire in Beijing, the family had lived in the city for the past three generations at the time of Zhu Yun's birth. Studying intensely in his youth, Zhu was ranked first place in the civil examinations of 1745 and later on was introduced into the Hanlin Academy. By his middle age, Zhu Yun was already an important, distinguished, and wealthy official in Beijing. His presence and stature in the city established Beijing as a rising cultural hub in competition to only the already known city of Jiangnan.

Serving in the mid-Qianlong era, Zhu Yun resided in the county of Daxing, which was nestled on the surrounding area of the Qing capital.

As a scholar, Zhu Yun enjoyed the works of other Chinese literati and had a vast collection of books, which included a manuscript of the writings of Wang Ji, a Tang Dynasty era poet. During his tenure as an official in Beijing, he welcomed a young Zhang Xuecheng into his home. It was during this visit that Zhang introduced himself to Zhu's extensive collection of literary works. As a result of this interaction, Zhu Yun subsequently became a teacher and mentor to Zhang Xuecheng. Their relationship was very close as after the death of Zhang's mother, it was Zhu who wrote a funeral ode to commemorate her life. Zhang Xuecheng would go on to write the Wenshi Tongyi and become a premier historian of Qing China.

Aside from his relationship with Zhang Xuecheng, Zhu Yun had interactions with many other scholars of his time. As an academic, he fostered close relationships with his disciples whom reportedly were numbered close to a thousand. Among Zhu Yun's academic acquaintances were Ruan Yuan (1764–1849) and Wang Zhong (1745–1794), who were both part of the social circle at the School of Yangzhou.

== Political Influence ==
Zhu was a favorite of Qianlong and had accompanied the Emperor on his tour to the city of Mu-lan during the summer of 1758. With such influence, Zhu established a government bureau devoted to the collection of books, which set the scholarly mood in the imperial court at the time. In 1772, Zhu Yun, who was then the Education Commissioner of Anhui, suggested to the Qianlong Emperor to collect all the scattered and known works from the predecessor Ming Dynasty into one compilation. This project was dubbed the Siku Quanshu.

While he was working on the imperial library, Zhu Yun and several colleagues used their political influence to undertake several side projects simultaneously. This in itself further extended Zhu's own ambition and work in the Han learning movement. During this time, Zhu introduced the scholar Shao Chin-Han to his contemporaries at the time, which subsequently influenced Shao in his future work on the Siku Commission. Shao's contributions showed areas of tension between the writing for the Qing Court and that of the Han learning movement. During his tenure as the Education Commissioner, Zhu Yun met with several other scholars such as Hung Laing-chi, Tai Chen, and Chang Hseuh-ch'eng to personally discuss his own memorial onto the Siku Quanshi project. In this sense, Zhu's acts ultimately secured his own legacy in the political scholarship projects of the High Qing period.

== Legacy ==
Shortly after Zhu Yun's plea, the Qianlong Emperor approved the commencement of the Siku Quanshu. Subsequently, the editorial privilege for the project was vested among the academic circle surrounding Zhu Yun. Zhu's position as a top scholar at the time ultimately resulted in his own additions of Han ideals into the Qing project.

The Qing, trying to strengthen their mandate, supported the traditional Confucian texts that were accepted by the people. However, Zhu Yun's influence resulted in scholars around his academic circle to argue against any Neo-Confucian texts whenever the opportunity presented itself. As a result, the Imperial Library project was mirrored and impaired with division. This lack of unity amongst the educated elite would later become a factor in the dissolving bureaucratic morale during the final decades of the Qing Dynasty.

Living in the same time as the corrupt official Heshen, Zhu inevitably found himself at odds in court. After his death in 1781, Zhu Yun's struggle to protect his Hanlin ideals against Heshen's influence was continued by his brother Zhu Gui. Heshen used his power to block Zhu Gui from entering the Imperial Court in the 1780s, but the younger Zhu instead served as Governor of Anhui from 1790 to 1794 and of Guangdong from 1794 to 1797. After Heshen's downfall in 1799, Zhu Gui was recalled to Beijing to serve as the head of The Boards of Personnel and Revenue. Zhu Gui's subsequent appointment marked the return of degree holding literati to important posts in the central government.
