= Consort Dun =

Chinese concubine

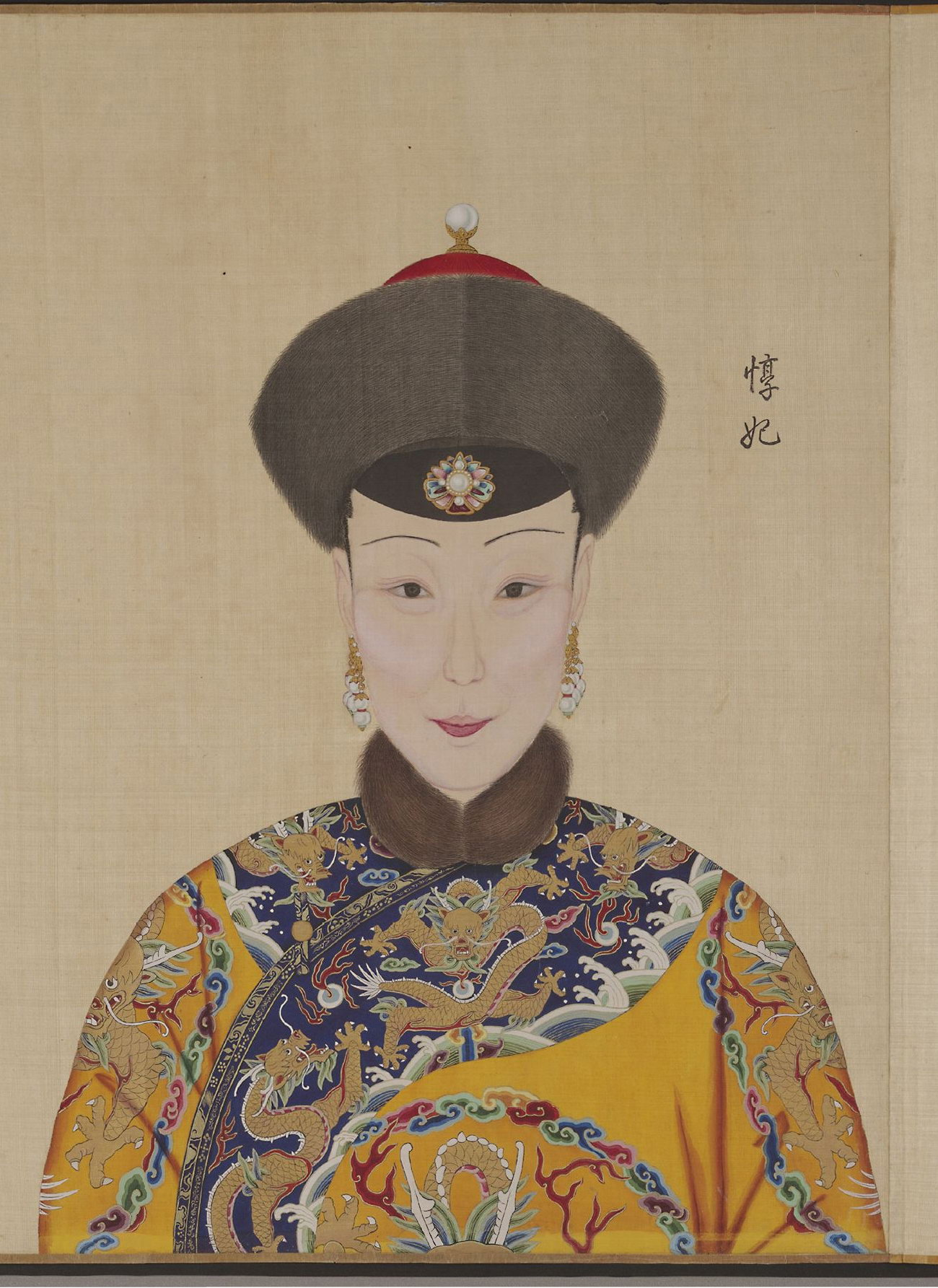
- Qing Dynasty portrait of Consort Dun
- Born: 27 March 1746
- Died: 6 March 1806 (aged 59); Forbidden City
- Burial: Yu Mausoleum, Eastern Qing tombs
- Spouse: Qianlong Emperor (died 1799)
- Issue: Princess Hexiao of the First Rank
- House: Wāng (汪; by birth); Aisin Gioro (by marriage)
- Father: Sige

Consort Dun
- Traditional Chinese: 惇妃
- Simplified Chinese: 惇妃
Transcriptions
Standard Mandarin
- Hanyu Pinyin: Dūn Fēi

Consort Dun (27 March 1746 – 6 March 1806), of the Manchu Plain White Banner Wang clan, was a consort of the Qianlong Emperor. She was 35 years his junior.

== Life ==
=== Family background ===
Consort Dun's personal name was not recorded in history. She was a Booi Aha of the Plain White Banner by birth.

- Father: Sige (四格; d. 1776), served as a first rank military official (都統)
  - Paternal grandfather: Saibitu (赛必图)
- One elder brother: Baning'a (巴宁阿), a salt controller (盐政)

=== Qianlong era ===
The future Consort Dun was born on the sixth day of the third lunar month in the 11th year of the reign of the Qianlong Emperor, which translates to 27 March 1746 in the Gregorian calendar.

It is not known when Lady Wang entered the Forbidden City and became a lady-in-waiting of the Qianlong Emperor. On 22 November 1763, she was granted the title "First Attendant Yong". On 14 July 1766, she was elevated to "Noble Lady Yong". It is not known when she was demoted to "First Attendant Yong". On 13 March 1771, she was restored as "Noble Lady Yong". It is not known when she was once more demoted to "First Attendant Yong". She was elevated on 2 January 1772 to "Concubine Dun", and in December 1774 or January 1775 to "Consort Dun".

On 2 February 1775, Lady Wang gave birth the emperor's tenth daughter, Princess Hexiao of the First Rank. The Qianlong Emperor deeply favoured the princess and showed even greater favour towards her mother.

In 1778, Lady Wang ordered a palace maid to be severely beaten for making a minor mistake. The maid later died from her injuries. The Qianlong Emperor felt very frustrated by this incident because under the Qing dynasty's laws, he ought to harshly punish Lady Wang for causing the maid's death, but at the same time he was worried about how punishing Lady Wang would affect Princess Hexiao of the First Rank. He eventually demoted Lady Wang to "Concubine Dun" on 21 December 1778, and ordered her to compensate the maid's family with 100 taels of silver and to pay half of the financial penalty levied on her servants, whose salaries were suspended for a year or two. However, in December 1779 or January 1780, Lady Wang was restored as "Consort Dun".

=== Jiaqing era ===
Lady Wang died on 6 March 1806, in the 10th year of the Jiaqing Emperor, the Qianlong Emperor's 15th son. She was interred in the Yu Mausoleum of the Eastern Qing tombs.

== Titles ==
- During the reign of the Qianlong Emperor (r. 1735–1796):
  - Lady Wang (汪氏; from 27 March 1746)
  - First Attendant Yong (永常在; from 22 November 1763), seventh rank consort
  - Noble Lady Yong (永貴人; from 14 July 1766), sixth rank consort
  - First Attendant Yong (永常在), seventh rank consort
  - Noble Lady Yong (永貴人; from 13 March 1771), sixth rank consort
  - First Attendant Yong (永常在), seventh rank consort
  - Concubine Dun (惇嬪; from 2 January 1772), fifth rank consort
  - Consort Dun (惇妃; from December 1774 or January 1775), fourth rank consort
  - Concubine Dun (惇嬪; from 21 December 1778), fifth rank consort
  - Consort Dun (惇妃; from December 1779 or January 1780), fourth rank consort

== Issue ==
- As Consort Dun:
  - Princess Hexiao of the First Rank (固倫和孝公主; 2 February 1775 – 13 October 1823), the Qianlong Emperor's tenth daughter
    - Married Fengšeninde (丰紳殷德; 1775–1810) of the Manchu Niohuru clan on 12 January 1790
  - Miscarriage (1777 or 1778)

== In fiction and popular culture ==
- Portrayed by Jiang Ruijia in Ruyi's Royal Love in the Palace (2018)

== See also ==
- Ranks of imperial consorts in China#Qing
- Royal and noble ranks of the Qing dynasty
