= History of Yuan =

14th-century official history

- Chinese: 元史
Transcriptions
Standard Mandarin
- Hanyu Pinyin: Yuán Shǐ; Yuánshǐ
- Wade–Giles: Yüan Shih; Yüan-shih
Southern Min
- Hokkien POJ: Goân-sú
- Tâi-lô: Guân-sú

The History of Yuan (Yuán Shǐ), also known as the Yuanshi, is one of the official Chinese historical works known as the Twenty-Four Histories of China. Commissioned by the court of the Ming dynasty, in accordance to political tradition, the text was composed in 1370 by the official Bureau of History of the Ming dynasty, under direction of Song Lian (1310–1381).

The compilation formalized the official history of the preceding Yuan dynasty. Under the guidance of Song Lian, the official dynastic history broke with the old Confucian historiographical tradition, establishing a new historical framework asserting that the influence of history was equal in influence to the great Confucian classics in determining the course of human affairs.

== Layout and contents ==
The historical work consists of 210 chapters chronicling the history of the Yuan dynasty from the time of Genghis Khan (c. 1162–1227) to the flight of the last Yuan emperor, Toghon Temür ("Emperor Huizong", 1333–1370), from Khanbaliq in 1368.

The chapters are, in turn, subdivided into the following:

- 47 Imperial biographies (本紀), detailing the lives of the Yuan emperors, including the pre-Yuan Mongol khans Genghis, Ögedei, Güyük and Möngke
- 58 Treatises (志), detailing socio-economic history, laws and rituals
- 8 Chronological tables (表)
- 97 Biographies (列傳), detailing important non-imperial people of the era

The Treatises include the Geography (地理) section, which spans volumes 58–63. This describes the regional Administrative divisions of the Yuan dynasty, organized by province (行省). The Selection of Officials (選舉) section spans volumes 81–84, describing the education and examination system. Volume 81 contains an imperial edit issued in 1291 regulating the establishment of schools and academies. Lao provides a description of some of the key terminology used in this section of the History of Yuan and how it relates the issues of the time. The section Official Posts (百官), which spans volumes 85–92, describes the agencies and positions within them that made up the Yuan imperial government. Farquhar explains the important terminology and organization of this section.

== Compilation ==
The History of Yuan was first commissioned by the Hongwu Emperor in the second year of his reign (1369), using materials such as the court historical records of the Yuan dynasty, which were stored in Khanbaliq and captured by Xu Da. A team of 16, led by Song Lian with contributions from Wang Yi (王禕) (1321–1372), Zhao Xun (趙壎), Li Shanchang, and others, compiled the first draft of the history within months.

However, due to the paucity of court records for the last years of the Yuan, compilation had to be paused while more historical material was sourced. In 1370, after a second commission, the History of Yuan was completed with new materials. Altogether, the 210-chapter history took a mere 331 days to compile.

The History of Yuan is unique among the official histories in that no commentary or evaluation of any biographical subjects was given by the compilers.

== Sources ==
Wilkinson states that the main source of the History of Yuan was the main Veritable Records (實錄) compiled over the period 1206-1369 during the 13 reigns from Taizu to Ningzong, which needed translation into Chinese. Farquhar mentions that the section of the Treatises on Official Posts was largely based on the Jingshi Dadian (經世大典), now lost.

== Criticism ==
The History of Yuan was criticised by imperial Chinese scholars for its lack of quality and numerous errors, attributed to the haste with which it was compiled. The Qing-era historian and linguist Qian Daxin commented that of the official histories, none was more quickly completed—or worse in quality—than that of the Yuan dynasty. Wang Huizu, another Qing-era scholar, compiled a work on the history pointing out more than 3,700 factual and textual errors in the text, including duplicated biographies for important figures such as Subutai, as well as inconsistent transliterations of the same name - Phagspa, for example, was transliterated in three different ways.

The Qing dynasty Qianlong Emperor used the Mongolian language to "correct" inconsistent and erroneous Chinese character transcriptions of Mongol names in the History of Yuan in his project: "Imperial compilation of the Three Histories of Liao, Jin, and Yuan explained in the National Language" (欽定遼金元三史國語解). Qianlong's "corrections" ended up compounding the errors and making the transcription of some foreign words in the History of Yuan even worse. Marshall Broomhall wrote that "So unscientific was this work that the K'ien-lung editions of the Liao, Kin, and Yüan histories are practically useless." Both the old and new transliterations were shown in the Qianlong edition. The Manchu word for village, farkha, replaced Ha-li-fa, a transliteration of Calif. Bie-shi-ba-li, a transliteration of the Turkish term for the city Bishbalik, was turned into Ba-shi-bo-li, with the explanation that "bashi" and "boli" were translations of "head" and "kidneys" in Arabic. Gi-lu-rh was created to sound more aesthetic than the transliteration K'ie-lu-lien, the name of the Mongolian river Kerulun.

== New history ==
Given the many errors in the text, efforts were made during the Qing and subsequent decades to re-compile the history of the Yuan. Qian Daxin completed some treatises and tables, and Ke Shaomin, a late Qing historian, re-compiled a 257-chapter text over thirty years, completing it in 1920. Ke's recompilation, the New History of Yuan, was given official historical status by the Republic of China in 1921, and was included as one of the Twenty-five histories.

== Translation ==
The History of Yuan was translated into Manchu as ᠶᡠᠸᠠᠨ
ᡤᡠᡵᡠᠨ ‍‍ᡳ
ᠰᡠᡩᡠᡵᡳ (Wylie: Yuwan gurun i suduri, Möllendorff: Yuwan gurun i suduri).

Mongolian scholar Dandaa translated the whole history into Classic Mongolian in the early 20th century. The effort was funded by the government of Mongolian People's Republic, and it is now kept in the National Archives of Mongolia.

Schurmann contains an annotated translation of volumes 93 and 94.

Xiao includes a translation of volumes 98 and 99.
