= Cheng Jinfang =

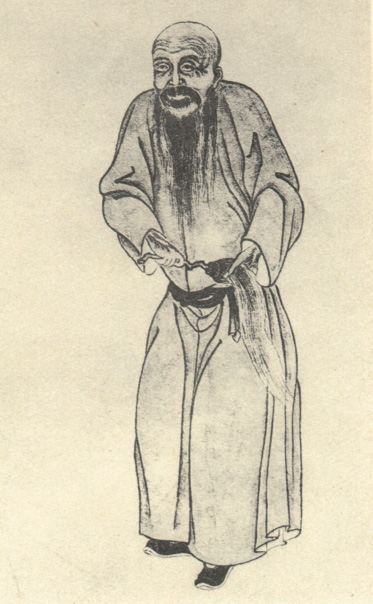
- Born: 1718; Huaian, Jiangsu province
- Died: 1784 (aged 65–66)
- Citizenship: Chinese
- Occupations: Poet and scholar
- Writing career
- Pen name: Jiyuan (蕺园)
- Genre: Poetry

Cheng Jinfang (Chinese: 程晋芳; pinyin: Chéng Jìnfāng) (1718–1784) was a well-known poet and scholar of the Qing Dynasty who followed the Tongcheng school of literary prose. His courtesy name was Yumen (鱼门) and his pseudonym was Jiyuan (蕺园).

== Life ==
Cheng was born in Huaian, Jiangsu province. His father was a merchant in the salt business. Huishang (徽商), that is to say, businessmen from Huizhou (徽州), not only did well in business, but also played an important role in cultural field. There were many Huizhou merchants who were excellent in academic fields. Cheng was such a Huishang (徽商) who did well both in business and Confucianism. He earned much while being interested in cultural investments. He achieved the Imperial examination degree of Jinshi in 1771 and he was appointed to the Hanlin Academy (翰林院). After that, he continued to take the imperial examination several times but failed all. In 1773, Cheng was appointed to edit Siku Quanshu.

Cheng married in 1736 to his cousin Xiao who was the daughter of his mother's brother. When he got elderly, he took two concubines.

Cheng carried on the family business in selling salt. Wu Jingzi (吴敬梓), who hated salt merchants, also became his friend. When the two became friends, Cheng was 24 and Wu was 41. But their friendship wasn't influenced by the difference of age and their sincere friendship lasted a lifetime. He often discussed academic problems with scholars. In his early life, Cheng made friends with Shang Pan (商盘) and Yuan Mei (袁枚). In his later years, he often traveled with Zhu Yun (朱筠) and Dai Zhen (戴震). Cheng was so dedicated in social and cultural work that he had no time to manage his business and eventually went bankrupt.

In April 1784, Cheng decided to go to Shaanxi Province to ask his friend Bi Yuan (毕沅) for help because of his financial problem. However, soon after Cheng's arrival at Bi Yuan's place, he died of illness on 21 June 1784.

== Studies ==
=== Confucianism ===
Cheng learnt Confucianism from one of his family member named Cheng Tingzuo (程廷祚), who was a famous specialist in Confucianism at that time. In Cheng's later years, he also learned Confucianism from master Dai zhen (戴震) and Zhu Yun (朱筠). Even though he was born rich, he immersed himself in studying Confucianism and he spent almost all his money in buying books and helping poor scholars. He bought over 50,000 books on Confucianism and the poor scholars were free to read them. He even offered them shelters and food and he enjoyed sharing ideas with those scholars.

=== Study on Wu Jingzi's scholars 儒林外史 ===
Cheng is one of Wu Jingzi’s (吴敬梓) most intimate friends in his late years. Wu Jingzi's Scholars was first published by Cheng, which is one of the greatest contributions to the world for him. Meanwhile, Cheng is also the first scholar to make an all-around comment on Wu and his Scholars. Cheng's records of Wu's life, his analysis of Wu the person and his thoughts, and his comments on the ideological theme of the Scholars are all of very high academic value. But his review of the author and the opus is biased, more or less, which shows the limitations of the time and the individual vision.

=== Thoughts on education ===
Cheng held the opinion that it was more important for scholars to be practical than to be academic. He was in favor of both innovation and seeking the truth from facts. Cheng pointed out that scholars should explore the true meaning of Confucius and Mencius rather than be pursuing the fame of Imperial Examination. Cheng also suggested that people should be proficient in both study and archery.

== Works ==
- Jiyuan Poetry 蕺园诗 in 30 volumes
- Opinion of the Book of Rites 礼记集释
- Study on similarities and differences of Mao’s and Zheng’s poems 诗毛郑异同考 in 10 volumes
- Interpretation of minister in modern style prose 尚书今文释义 in 40 volumes
- Brief explanation of minister in ancient style prose 尚书古文解略 in 6 volumes
- The purpose of the Book of Change 周易知旨编 in more than 30 and less than 40 volumes
- Article of Mianhezhai 勉和斋文 in 10 volumes
- Questions and Answers about Confucianism 诸经答问 in 12 volumes
- Comments of Chunqiu Zuo Zhuan 春秋左传翼疏 in 32 volumes
- Inscriptions of books 群书题跋 in 6 volumes

== Chronicle of Cheng's works ==
- 1749, Cheng composed Yearning for my friends 怀人诗, including a poem for Wu Jingzi.
- 1752, Cheng took The imperial examination in Nanjing.
- 1753, Cheng went to Beijing and composed Song of Mare’s Milk and Grapes 马乳葡萄歌 before he went back to Nanjing.
- 1754, Cheng composed A poem for chronicles 纪事诗 after watching traditional Chinese opera Zaju. The same year, inscribing a poem on a painting called Similar to living in a secluded valley 类谷居图 .
- 1758, Cheng composed yuefu-like Ditty of selling flowers 卖花唱, Ballad of Zhang Le 张乐谣, in total 20 poems.
- 1762 March, Qianlong Emperor travelled to Jiangsu, Cheng composed 4 chapters of rhymed prose called Yangtze River goes to court 江汉朝宗赋 to the emperor and greatly pleased him. Qianlong Emperor announced Cheng's poems to be the best and offered him an official position as a member of the cabinet so Cheng moved to Beijing. He lived there until April 1784.
- 1763, Cheng gathered together with Ruan Kuisheng (阮葵生) and some other friends in Beijing and composed Conjunctions of fighting quails 斗鹌鹑联句 which was titled with some kind of folk custom.
- 1764, Cheng inscribed Picture for safety on the boat in homeward journey 归舟安稳图 for Jiang Shiquan (蒋士铨) and saw Jiang off back to the south.
- 1766, Cheng composed a somber song called Poem of mice's gnawing 鼠啮诗 for Wang Chen (王宸).
- 1768, 10 May, Cheng composed Chronicle of reed cottage in Huaiyin 淮阴芦屋记 to record the past of Bian Shoumin (边寿民). Besides, he composed Biography of Mr Wenmu 文木先生传 to record the life of Wu Jingzi (吴敬梓).
- 1769, Cheng inscribed Picture of papers and classics in a cottage in snow 雪屋笺经图 for Ren Dachun (任大椿) from Xinghua, Jiangsu.
- 1770, Cheng went sightseeing in Suzhou with Wang Wenzhi (王文治), Wu Tailai (吴泰来) and some others and composed Song of fishing and watching lanterns by pleasure-boat 钓戈行灯歌 . He came to Suzhou to meet Hua Song (华淞) who just came back to his hometown. After that, he went to the north passing by Anhui ending with meeting Shen Dacheng (沈大成), Jin Zhaoyan (金兆燕) and some others in Yangzhou and composed Song of enjoying fragrance in Zhuxi 竹西访桂歌.
- 1771, Cheng became presented scholar and worked in the Ministry of Official Personnel Affairs. Afterward, he also took charge of another department.
- 1772, Cheng compiled The list of Guihuan collection of books 桂宦藏书目 .
- 1773, Cheng was appointed to edit Siku Quanshu
- 1776, Cheng compiled Comments of Chunqiu Zuo Zhuan 春秋左传翼疏 with others.
- 1777, When Yan Changming (严长明) came to Huaian, Cheng wrote a preface for Yan's Guiqiu cottage collections of poems 归求草堂诗集 .
- 1779, Because of poverty, Cheng sold his collection Picture of Zhuxi Gechui 竹西歌吹图卷 (a picture which was painted by Shitao).
