= Wang Xibang =

Chinese painter, calligrapher, poet

WANG Xibang
- 汪西邦
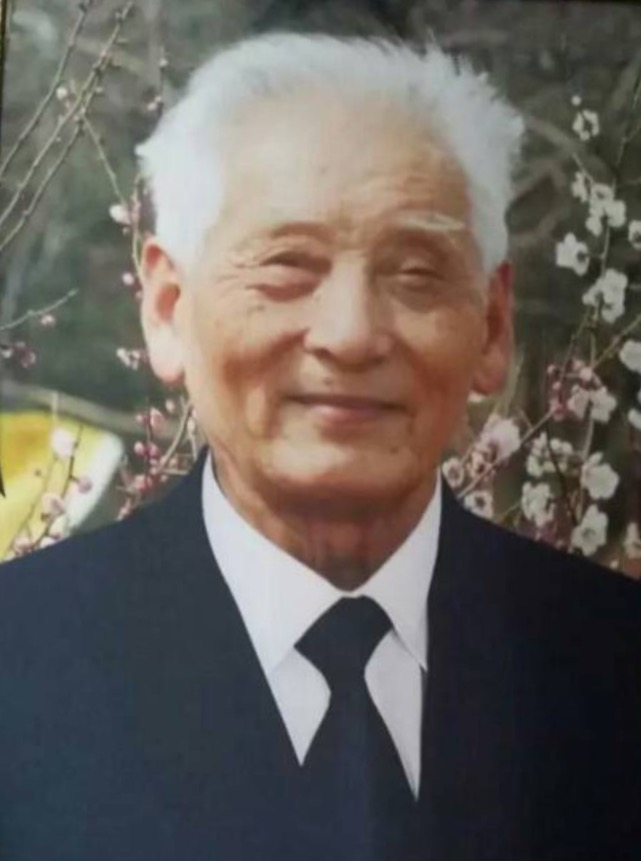
- Born: October , 1925; Shucheng, Anhui, China
- Died: July , 2015; Huangshan, Anhui, China
- Known for: Chinese Calligraphy and Painting
- Style: Classical
- Spouse: GAO Xinwu

Wang Xibang (Chinese: 汪西邦; pinyin: Wāng Xībāng; 1925 – 2015) was a contemporary Chinese painter, calligrapher, poet, educator, and antique collector. Wang Xibang excelled in calligraphy and painting of plum blossom, pine, lotus, peony, wisteria, and loquat tree. He was the founder of Xin’an Association of Fine Arts, a member of the Chinese Artists Association, and a member of the Chinese Poet Association.

== Overview ==
Wang Xibang was born in Shucheng, Anhui, China. He showed talents in painting at an early age, and graduated from the Department of Art in Anhui College in 1940s, now Anhui University, the only university in Anhui Province back then. After being suppressed during Anti-Rightist Movement and Cultural Revolution, in 1982, Wang Xibang founded Xin’an Association of Fine Arts (新安书画社) in Huangshan City and promoted Xin’an style classical Chinese painting and calligraphy. His works won Golden Prize in a series of national level fine art contests during 1980s to 2000s, such as the National Zhongyuan Cup Art Exhibition, Chinese Major Art Exhibition, etc. Wang Xibang was an active art educator and counselor. He was an academician of National Major Academy of Art, the Vice President of Anhui Bingzhu Association of Poetry and Art, an Art Counselor of Nanjing International Association of Plum Tree Art, and others. Wang Xibang also educated many Japanese calligraphy students.

Wang Xibang was famed for semi-cursive script Chinese calligraphy, classical Chinese painting, poem, pottery, and Chinese seal carving. His calligraphy was deeply influenced by Wang Xizhi, Wang Xianzhi, and Ouyang Xun. His art works demonstrate a perfect combination and aesthetics of Chinese poetry, calligraphy, and painting. Wang Xibang had multiple solo exhibitions across China in 1990s and 2000s. His paintings and calligraphy were exhibited and collected by the Great Hall of the People and the Cultural Palace of Nationalities. His calligraphy was carved in many stele institutes, such as Hunan Tianyu Stele Institute, Shandong Linyi Stele Temple, Hubei Lotus Mountain Stele Forest, Fujian Anxi Stele Institute, and Anhui Shengquan Stele Forest. Wang Xi’bang also had exhibitions in Tokyo, Gifu, Moscow, and many other Asian and European countries.

In addition to art, Wang Xibang was a well-known educator in classical Chinese literature and history. During 1980s to 2000s, Wang Xibang was the Vice Chairman of the National People’s Congress of Huangshan City and a Representative of the 7th National People’s Congress of Anhui Province.

== Biography ==
Wang Xibang was born to a wealthy family in Shucheng, Anhui Providence, the oldest of seven children. His father, Wang Jiaozhi, was a landlord and businessman, who promoted high education and civil activities throughout his life. Wang Xibang was sent to private school for rigorous training of classical Chinese literature and Confucius theory. He showed high intelligence and talents in painting at an early age and was encouraged by his father to be a great artist and educator. Wang Xibang was appointed to study in the Department of Art at Anhui College by Zhonghe Scholar, who later became his advisor. Wang Xibang was devoted to education of classical Chinese literature and history during the Anti-Rightest Movements and Cultural Revolution (1950 -1980), and went back to creating art works after 1980s.

Wang Xibang was married to wife Gao Xinwu for seven decades and had five children.
