= Wang Deyao =

Chinese cell biologist

- 汪德耀
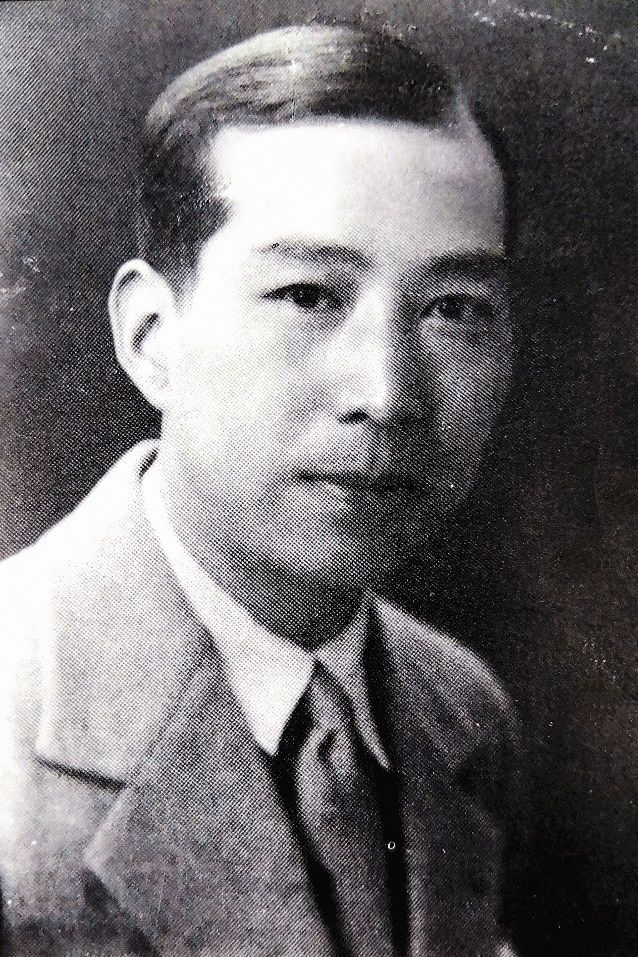
- Born: 8 February 1903
- Died: 12 October 2000 (aged 97)
- Other names: Ouang Te Yio (French); Wang Boming (Courtesy name)
- Occupation: Cell biologist

Chinese name
- Traditional Chinese: 汪德耀
- Simplified Chinese: 汪德耀
Transcriptions
Standard Mandarin
- Hanyu Pinyin: wāng dé yào
- Wade–Giles: wang te yao

Wang Deyao (Chinese: 汪德耀, 8 February 1903 – 12 October 2000), also known as Ouang Te Yio, was the first Chinese professor in cell biology and the fourth president of the Xiamen University.

== Early years ==
Wang was born on 8 February 1903, in Guanyun County, Jiangsu Province. He received some private education in his early years. After moving with his family to Beijing in 1912, he attended the High School Affiliated to Beijing Normal University. In his second year, he became the vice chairman of the student council. During the May Fourth Movement in 1919, he and the student council president Zhao Shiyan participated in the demonstrations against the Beiyang government.

In 1921, Wang traveled to France on a government scholarship to study in the Sino-French Institute of Lyon (French: Institut franco-chinois de Lyon), earning a master's degree in biology in 1925. Between 1926 and 1931, he studied and completed a doctorate at the University of Paris, becoming the first Chinese national to earn a doctorate degree in cytology.

== Career ==
In November 1931, Wang returned to China. On 27 October 1939, he took part in the establishment of National Teacher's College in Anhua County of Hunan, where he served as the Dean of Academic Affairs. In 1941, he contributed to the founding of the Fujian Provincial Research Institute in Yong'an at the invitation of the Fujian provincial government.

In 1943, Wang joined Xiamen University as a professor in the Department of Biology. He later served as the department chair and dean of the School of Science. In 1944, he became the acting president of the university after President Sa Bendong traveled to the United States for lectures. On February 10, 1947, Wang was officially appointed president of National Xiamen University by the Nationalist government.

After the establishment of the People's Republic of China, Wang stepped down from his position as the president of the Xiamen University, and continued teaching in the Department of Biology. In 1963, he was appointed as a researcher at the Institute of Genetics under the Chinese Academy of Sciences.

Following the Cultural Revolution, he served as the vice chairman of the Chinese Society of Cell Biology in the early 1980s. In 1985, he was awarded an honorary doctorate by the University of Nice. He died of illness on 12 October 2000.
