= Princess Hexiao =

Qing dynasty princess (1775–1823)

Princess Hexiao of the First Rank
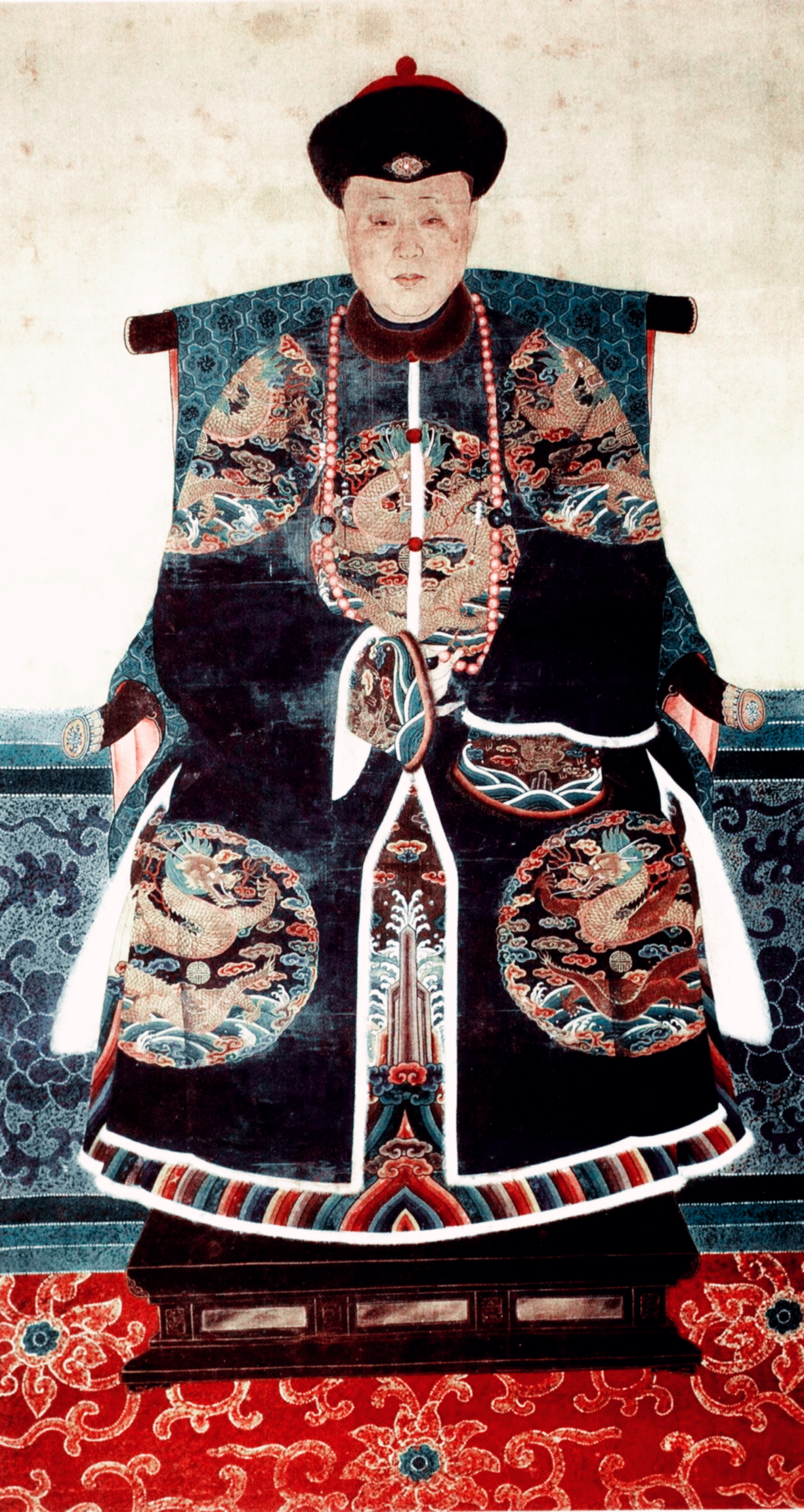
- Born: 2 February 1775
- Died: 13 October 1823 (aged 48)
- Spouse: Fengšeninde
- Issue: 1 unnamed son
- House: Aisin Gioro (by birth); Niohuru (by marriage)
- Father: Qianlong Emperor
- Mother: Consort Dun

Princess Hexiao
- Traditional Chinese: 固倫和孝公主
- Simplified Chinese: 固伦和孝公主
Transcriptions
Standard Mandarin
- Hanyu Pinyin: Gùlún Héxiào Gōngzhǔ

Princess Hexiao of the First Rank (1775 – 1823) was a Manchu princess of the Qing dynasty. She was the tenth and youngest daughter of the Qianlong Emperor. Her mother was Consort Dun. She was one of only two female recipients of the Pictures of the Victorious Pacification of the Two Jinchuans from Qianlong, and was said to be his favorite daughter.

== Birth and childhood ==
The future Princess Hexiao was born in 1775 when the Qianlong Emperor was already 63 years old. At the time of her birth, nearly all of the Qianlong's other daughters had either died or married and left the palace. Qianlong was thus overjoyed when he heard news of the birth of another daughter. The Princess was deeply favoured by her father from birth. Throughout her childhood, ministers and courtiers remarked that the Tenth Princess—as she was commonly referred to—resembled her father in appearance. She was said to be resolute in character, and frequently accompanied the Qianlong Emperor on hunting excursions.

Going against tradition, the Qianlong Emperor elevated his tenth daughter from the status of a "Princess of the Second Rank" (usually accorded to a daughter born to an imperial consort) to a "Princess of the First Rank" (usually accorded to a daughter born to the empress). Therefore, the Tenth Princess became known as "Princess Hexiao of the First Rank".

== Marriage ==
On 12 January 1790, she married Fengšeninde (豐紳殷德; 1775–1810) of the Niohuru clan, a prominent Manchu clan. Fengšeninde was the eldest son of Heshen, an official highly favoured by the Qianlong Emperor. Princess Hexiao's dowry of 300,000 silver taels far exceeded that of any other of the Qianlong Emperor's daughters. Princess Hexiao and Fengšeninde had a son, who was born sometime between 1794 and 1796, but died young in 1798.

== Heshen's fall from power ==
In 1799, shortly after the Qianlong Emperor's death, Princess Hexiao's father-in-law, Heshen, was arrested on charges of corruption and political incompetence. Found guilty, Heshen was initially sentenced to death by slow slicing. However, the Jiaqing Emperor, who succeeded the Qianlong Emperor, permitted Heshen to commit suicide in his own residence out of respect for his tenth sister. Heshen's immense wealth, amassed over a long career of corrupt activities, were confiscated. The Jiaqing Emperor granted amnesty to Princess Hexiao and even granted her part of Heshen's confiscated property. Fengšeninde, on the other hand, was stripped of his privileges and titles but remained similarly unharmed.

== Later life ==
In 1806, the Jiaqing Emperor sent Fengšeninde to Uliastai to serve as a military official. Fengšeninde fell ill after serving there for some time. Princess Hexiao begged the Jiaqing Emperor to allow them to return to Beijing. The Emperor agreed. Fengšeninde returned to Beijing in February 1810 and was enfeoffed as the "Duke of Jin" (晋公). He died three months later in May, leaving Princess Hexiao widowed.

After Fengšeninde's death, Princess Hexiao raised her two daughters (both born to his concubine), who were eleven and five years old respectively when their father died. She was financially stable; the Jiaqing Emperor made the Imperial Household Department ensure that she was well taken care of. Princess Hexiao died on 13 October 1823 during the reign of the Jiaqing Emperor's successor, the Daoguang Emperor. The cost of her funeral, paid for by the Imperial Household Department, amounted to about 5,000 silver taels.

== In fiction and popular culture ==
- Portrayed by Ng Tsi-yin in The Rise and Fall of Qing Dynasty (1988)
- Portrayed by Stephanie Ho in Succession War (2018)
