= Wang Qiao (engineer) =

Chinese environmentalist

- Born: August 13, 1957 (age 69); Chongqing, China
- Education: Nankai University; Wuhan University
- Scientific career
- Fields: Environmental protection
- Workplaces: Ministry of Ecology and Environment Center for Satellite Application on Ecology and Environment

Chinese name
- Traditional Chinese: 王橋
- Simplified Chinese: 王桥
Transcriptions
Standard Mandarin
- Hanyu Pinyin: Wáng Qiáo

Wang Qiao (Chinese: 王桥; born 13 August 1957) is a Chinese environmentalist currently serving as director of the Ministry of Ecology and Environment Center for Satellite Application on Ecology and Environment.

== Biography ==
Wang was born in Chongqing on August 13, 1957. In 1982 he graduated from Nankai University, majoring in mathematics. He received his master's degree in cartography and doctor's degree in cartography and geographical information system from Wuhan University in 1992 and 1996, respectively. In June 2009 he was appointed deputy director of the Ministry of Ecology and Environment Center for Satellite Application on Ecology and Environment, five years later he was promoted to the director position.

== Honours and awards ==
- July 2018 Fellow of the International Academy of Astronautics (IAA)
- November 22, 2019 Member of the Chinese Academy of Engineering (CAE)
