= Wang Yuhao =

Chinese footballer

Personal information
- Date of birth: 29 June 1996 (age 30)
- Height: 1.75 m (5 ft 9 in)
- Position: Midfielder

Youth career
- –2018: Shanghai Jiading Boji

Senior career*
Years	Team	Apps	(Gls)
2018–2019	Sloboda Užice	1	(0)
- * Club domestic league appearances and goals as of 16:41, 23 December 2019 (UTC)

Wang Yuhao (Chinese: 汪宇豪; pinyin: Wāng Yǔháo; born 29 June 1996) is a Chinese footballer.

== Career statistics ==
=== Club ===
As of 23 December 2019.

Club	Season	League			Cup		Continental		Other		Total	
Club	Season	Division	Apps	Goals	Apps	Goals	Apps	Goals	Apps	Goals	Apps	Goals
Sloboda Užice	2018–19	Serbian First League	1	0	0	0	–		0	0	1	0
Career total			1	0	0	0	0	0	0	0	1	0
