= Zhang Xuecheng =

Qing dynasty historian, writer and philosopher

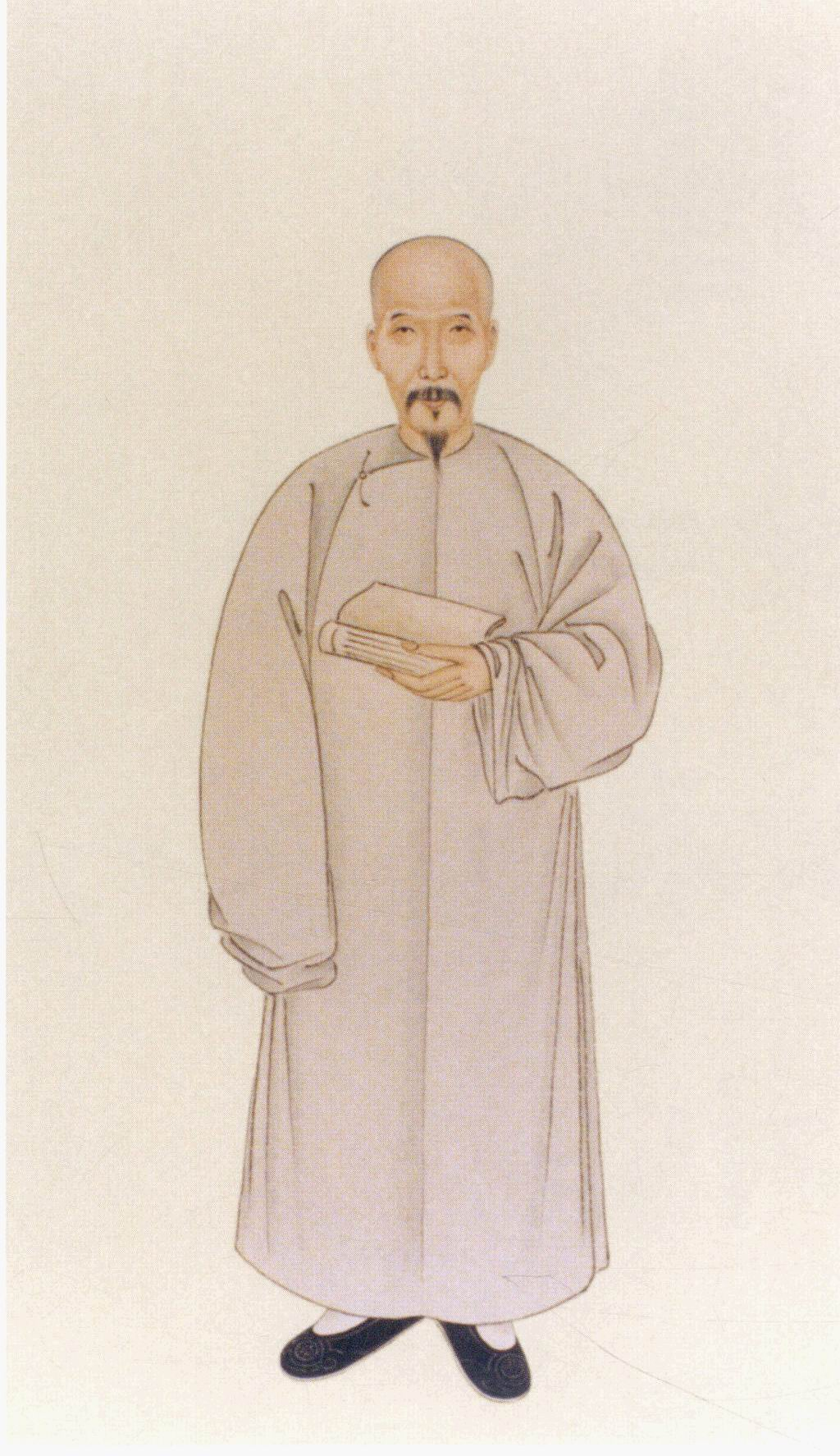
Zhang Xuecheng

Zhang Xuecheng (Chinese: 章學誠; Wade–Giles: Chang Hsüeh-ch'eng; 1738–1801) was a Chinese historian and philosopher during the Qing dynasty. His father and his grandfather had been government officials, but, although Zhang achieved the highest civil service examination degree in 1778, he never held high office. Zhang's ideas about the historical process were revolutionary in many ways and he became one of the most enlightened historical theorists of the Qing dynasty, but he spent much of his life in near poverty without the support of a patron and, in 1801, he died, poor and with few friends. It was not until the late 19th century that Chinese scholars began to accept the validity of Zhang's ideas.

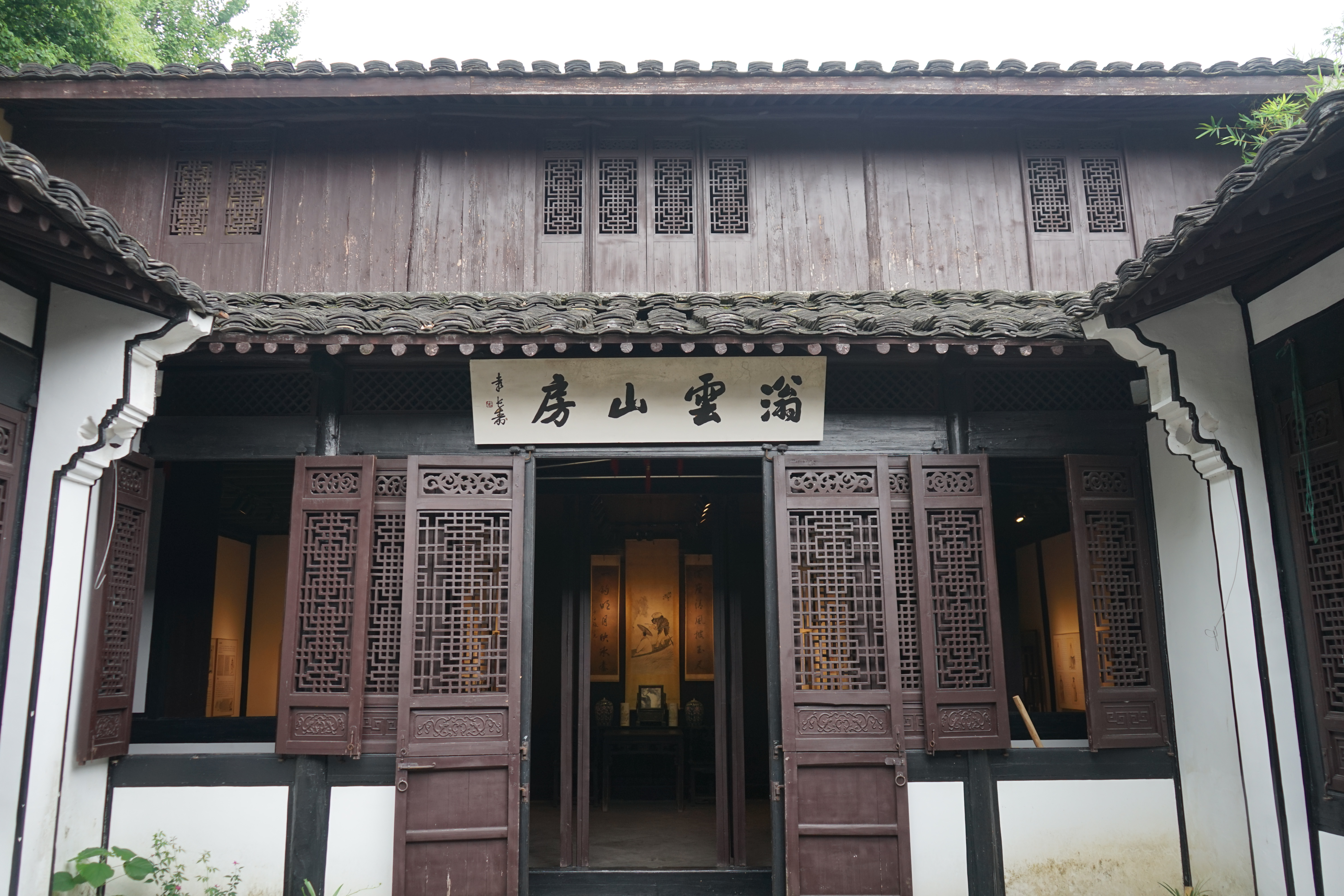
Former Residence of Zhang Xuecheng in Shaoxing

His biographer, David Nivison, comments that while his countrymen did not think him a great literary artist, "the infrequent western reader will find his style often both moving and powerful." Zhang developed, Nivison continues, "an organic view of history and the state that approaches Hegelian thought, and then built this view upon and into a theory of culture that sometimes suggests Vico," the Italian philosopher.

His magnum opus, On Literature and History (Wénshǐ Tōngyì 文史通義), was published posthumously, in 1832. In Zhang's view, Confucianism developed over time in response to the concrete needs of the people for social organization. This developmental view contrasts with the view of the Neo-Confucians that Confucianism is the expression of timeless "principles" or "patterns" that are inherent in the human heart. Zhang's most famous quotation is that "the six classics are all history" (liù jīng jiē shǐ 六經皆史). This means that the canonical texts of Confucianism are not to be understood as repositories of timeless wisdom, but as records of the actions and words of the sages in response to specific historical contexts.
