= Wang Qiao (painter) =

Wang Qiao (Chinese: 汪乔), courtesy name Zongjing, was a painter who lived in Qing dynasty China. He was from Suzhou and was active from 1657 to 1680. He is known for his figure paintings and paintings of flowers. A painting usually entitled Lady at a Dressing Table is one of his best-known paintings. It bears an important colophon by the early nineteenth century woman poet Zhou Qi.
