= Wang Zhong (Qing dynasty) =

- Chinese: 汪中
- Hanyu Pinyin: Wāng Zhōng
- Wade–Giles: Wang^{1} Chung^{1}

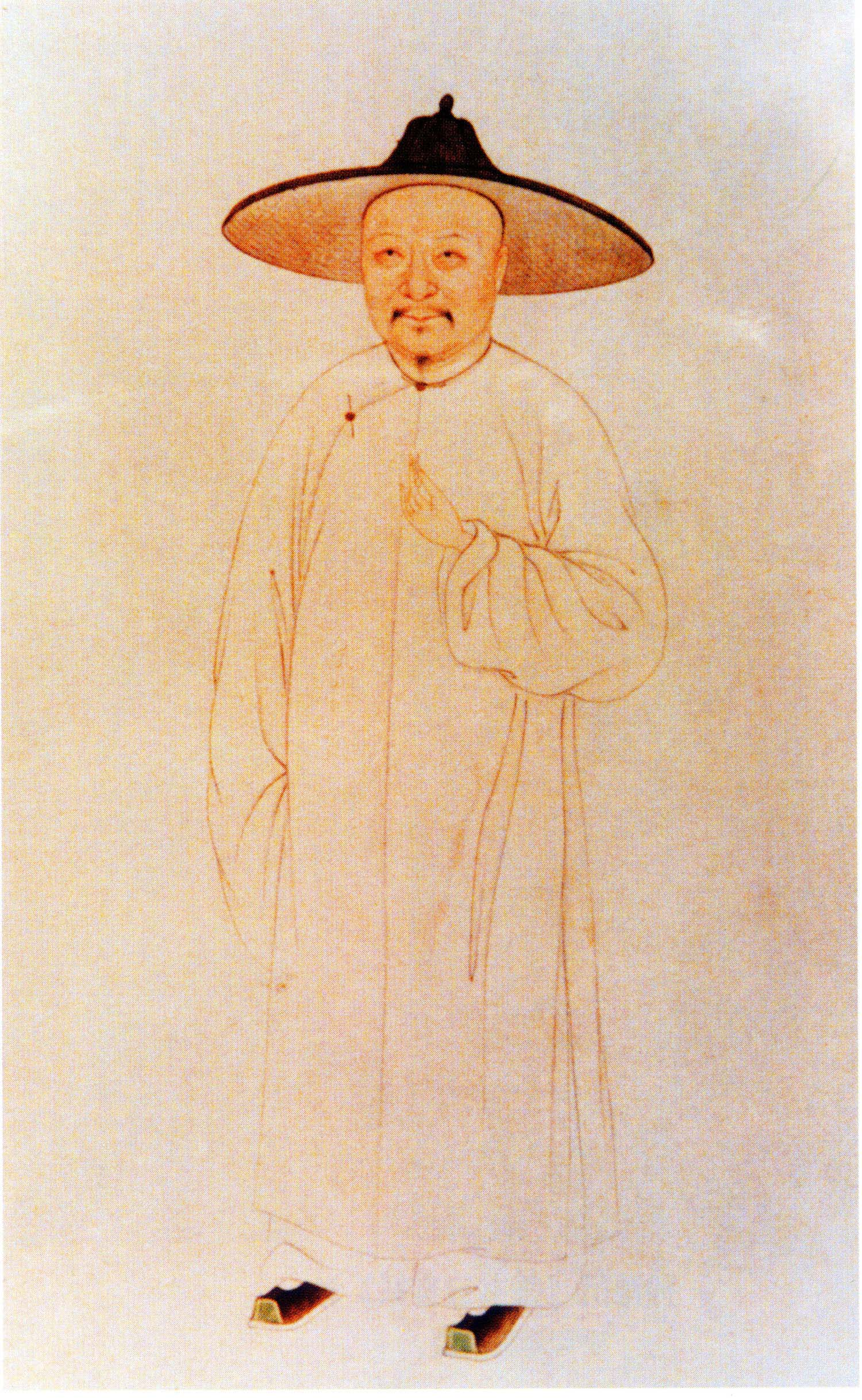
Wang Zhong

Wang Zhong (1745–1794) was a Qing-dynasty Chinese scholar from Jiangdu District in Yangzhou. He has been characterised as "the most arrogant scholar of his age".

== Works ==
- Guangling dui (廣陵對, Answers about Guangling), 1787
- Shu xue (Records of Learning), 1792
- Guangling tongdian (Comprehensive Standard Work of Guanling), published posthumously, 1823
