= Yicai (prince) =

- Prince Qing of the Second Rank 多羅慶郡王

Head of the House of Prince Qing peerage
- Tenure: 1837–1842
- Predecessor: Mianmin (as Prince Qing)
- Successor: Mianti (Prince of the Fourth Rank)
- Born: 20 April 1820
- Died: 21 February 1866 (aged 45)
Names
- Yicai (奕綵)
- House: Aisin Gioro
- Father: Mianzhi
- Mother: Lady An

Yicai (Chinese: 奕綵, 20 April 1820 - 21 February 1866) was Qing dynasty imperial prince as a biological son of Mianzhi, Prince Yishun of the Second Rank and the third in Prince Qing peerage as an adoptive son of Mianmin.

== Life ==
Yicai was born on 20 April 1820 to lady An, Mianzhi's mistress. In 1836, he was adopted as Mianmin's son as all children of the prince Qingliang of the Second Rank died prematurely. Shortly after the adoption, Yicai inherited Mianmin's title because the peerage was neither promoted to the first rank nor granted a status of qinwang. The promotional ceremony was held at the New Year (除夕夜). Around 1842, Yicai was accused of accepting bribes from officials. Daoguang Emperor issued a decree imprisoning him at the Imperial Clan Court together with consorts for further investigation. His mother was punished by deprivation of her allowance. As the accusations were confirmed, Yicai was stripped of his title. The title was later passed to Yikuang, who was finally promoted to the prince of the first rank in 1889.

Yicai did not recover the previous title. Nevertheless, he was not granted red girdles because of his later deeds. In 1855, he falsely reported that his elder brother Yiyin guarded the Western Qing tombs. He was relocated to the capital and died on 21 February 1866.

== Family ==
Yicai was initially married to lady Irgen Gioro and later married lady Ulanghan, daughter of Tuo'enduo (拖恩多).

- Primary consort, of the Irgen Gioro clan (嫡福晋 伊尔根觉罗氏)
- Second Primary consort, of the Ulanghan clan (继福晋 乌朗罕氏, d.1867)
  - Zaiju (载钜, 1845–1847), third son
  - Zaidi (载棣, 1849–1872), fifth son
  - Zaipang (载庞, 1854–?), sixth son. Married lady Irgen Gioro, lady Bai and had issue (4 sons)
- Mistress, of the Wang clan (庶福晋 王氏)
- Mistress, of the Xu clan (庶福晋 许氏)
- Mistress of the Li clan (庶福晋 李氏)
  - Zaixian (载铣, 1842–1886), first son. Married lady Ezhuo and had issue (2 sons, including Puzhai and Puyi)
  - Zaichong (载冲), second son
- Mistress, of the Liu clan (庶福晋 刘氏)
  - Zai'ao (载鏊, 1846–1884), fourth son. Married lady Ligiya.
- Mistress, of the Chen clan (庶福晋 陈氏)
