= Yi Kuang =

Yi Kuang may refer to:

- Yikuang (1838–1917), formally Prince Qing, Qing dynasty politician
- Ni Kuang (born 1935), Chinese writer
