= Prince Yi =

Prince Yi may refer to the following princely peerages of the Qing dynasty in China:

- Prince Yi (created 1722) (怡)
- Prince Yi (created 1797) (儀)
