= Imperial Noble Consort Shujia =

Korean consort of the Qianlong Emperor (1713–1755)

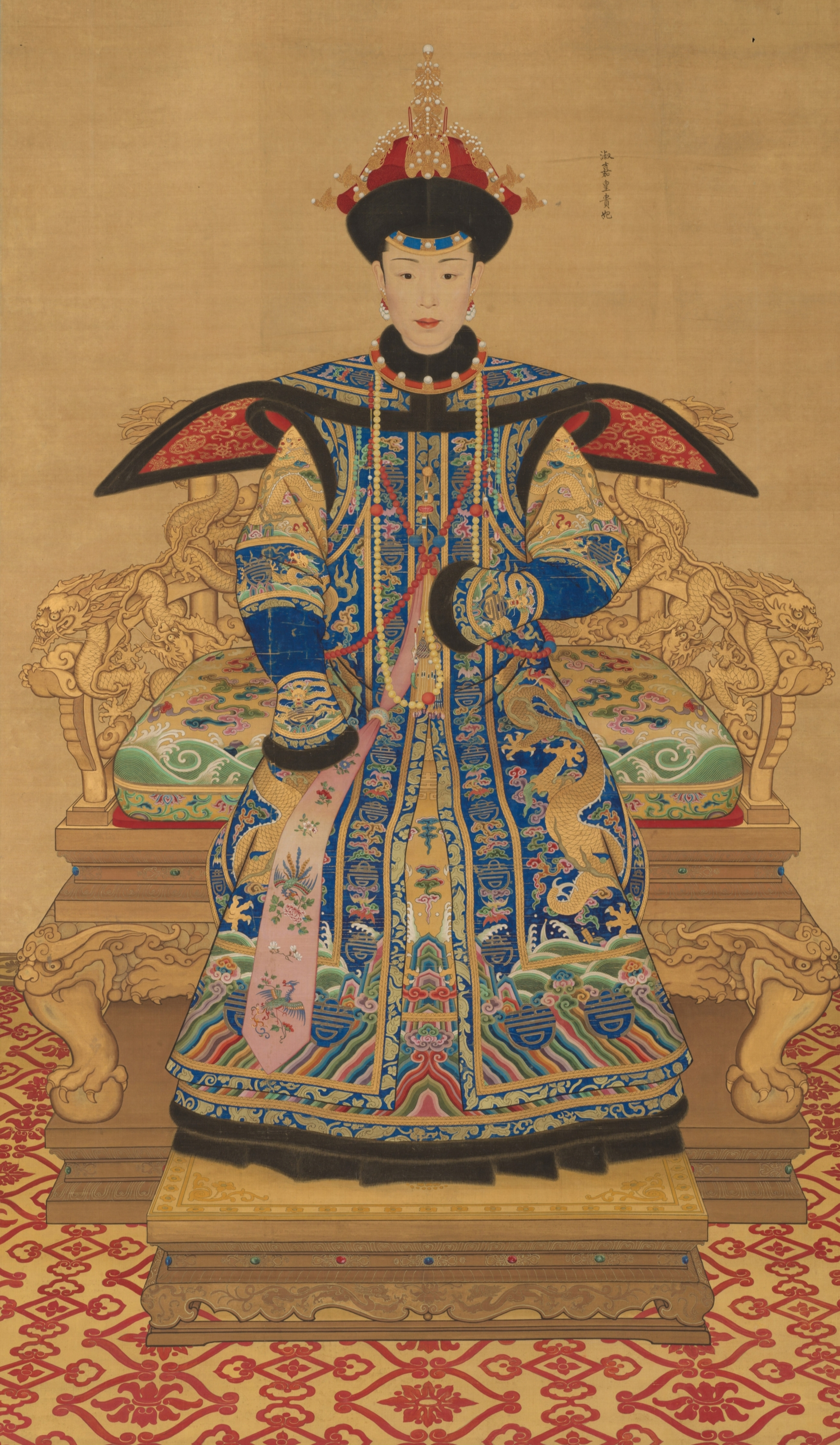
- Born: 14 September 1713 (康熙五十二年 七月 二十五日)
- Died: 17 December 1755 (aged 42) (乾隆二十年 十一月 十五日); Forbidden City
- Burial: Yu Mausoleum, Eastern Qing tombs
- Spouse: Qianlong Emperor (before 1755)
- Issue: Yongcheng, Prince Lüduan of the First Rank; Yongxuan, Prince Yishen of the First Rank; Yongyu; Yongxing, Prince Chengzhe of the First Rank
Posthumous name
- Imperial Noble Consort Shujia (淑嘉皇貴妃)
- House: Jin, later Gingiya (金佳; by birth); Aisin Gioro (by marriage)

Imperial Noble Consort Shujia
- Traditional Chinese: 淑嘉皇貴妃
- Simplified Chinese: 淑嘉皇贵妃
Transcriptions
Standard Mandarin
- Hanyu Pinyin: Shūjiā Huángguìfēi

Imperial Noble Consort Shujia (14 September 1713 – 17 December 1755), of the Korean Gingiya clan which was placed into the Manchu Bordered Yellow Banner after her death, was a consort of the Qianlong Emperor. She was two years his junior. Imperial Noble Consort Shujia was also the Qing dynasty's only imperial concubine of ethnic Korean heritage.

== Life ==
Imperial Noble Consort Shujia's family was born into the Korean Gin clan, a family originally from Uiju, Joseon, which surrendered to the Qing Dynasty and eventually moved to China during the Qing invasion of Joseon in 1636. Her family was very influenced by Manchurian culture and was later moved into a Manchu banner. Her original surname Jin (Kim) was Manchufied to Gingiya. Her father Sanbao (三寶), served as a third rank military official (卿) in the Imperial Stables. She had three elder brothers: Jin Ding (金鼎), Jin Hui (金輝) and Jin Jian (金簡)

Lady Jin was born on 14 September 1713, in Uiju, Joseon. Little is known about her life before she became a Mistress to Hongli, the future Qianlong Emperor.

It is not known when Lady Jin became a mistress to Hongli, the future Qianlong Emperor, but she did marry him before he married his Primary Consort Fuca. It is highly possible she and the Secondary Consort Gao were close friends, as their families were also very closely allied.

Lady Jin was titled as a Noble Lady on 8 November 1735. On 23 January 1738 she was promoted to and titled as "Imperial Concubine Jia". On 21 February 1739 she gave birth to the emperor's fourth son Yongcheng. In December 1741 or January 1742 she was promoted to "Consort Jia". While holding this title Lady Jin had another two sons, Yongxuan on 31 August 1746 and Yongyu on 2 August 1748 who would die prematurely on 11 June 1749, a month after Lady Jin was promoted to "Noble Consort Jia" on 20 May. On 22 March 1752 Lady Jin had her last child, Yongxing. Lady Jin's health began to deteriorate and she soon fell ill with a high fever in November 1755 and died a month later on 17 December. She was promoted to Imperial Noble Consort the following day, and the day after that, she was given her final title, "Imperial Noble Consort Shujia".

== Titles ==
- During the reign of the Kangxi Emperor (r. 1661–1722):
  - Lady Jin (from 14 September 1713)
- During the reign of the Yongzheng Emperor (r. 1722–1735):
  - Mistress (格格)
- During the reign of the Qianlong Emperor (r. 1735–1796):
  - Noble Lady (貴人; from 8 November 1735), sixth rank consort
  - Imperial Concubine Jia (嘉嬪; from 23 January 1738), fifth rank consort
  - Consort Jia (嘉妃; from December 1741 or January 1742), fourth rank consort
  - Noble Consort Jia (嘉貴妃; from 20 May 1749), third rank consort
  - Imperial Noble Consort (皇貴妃; from 18 December 1755), second rank consort
  - Imperial Noble Consort Shujia (淑嘉皇貴妃; from 19 December 1755)

== Issue ==
- As Imperial Concubine Jia:
  - Yongcheng (永珹; 21 February 1739 – 5 April 1777), the Qianlong Emperor's fourth son, granted the title Prince Lü of the Second Rank in 1763, posthumously honoured as Prince Lüduan of the First Rank
- As Consort Jia:
  - Yongxuan (永璇; 31 August 1746 – 1 September 1832), the Qianlong Emperor's eighth son, granted the title Prince Yi of the Second Rank in 1779, elevated to Prince Yi of the First Rank in 1797, posthumously honoured as Prince Yishen of the First Rank
  - Yongyu (永瑜; 2 August 1748 – 11 June 1749), The Qianlong Emperor's ninth son
- As Noble Consort Jia:
  - Yongxing (永瑆; 22 March 1752 – 10 May 1823), the Qianlong Emperor's 11th son, granted the title Prince Cheng of the First Rank in 1789, posthumously honoured as Prince Chengzhe of the First Rank

== In fiction and popular culture ==
- Portrayed by Pan Shiqi in Story of Yanxi Palace (2018)
- Portrayed by Xin Zhilei in Ruyi's Royal Love in the Palace (2018)

== See also ==
- Consort Han, a Korean concubine of the Hongwu Emperor of the Ming dynasty
- Empress Gi, a Korean concubine and later empress of the Yuan emperor Toghon Temür
- Ranks of imperial consorts in China
- Royal and noble ranks of the Qing dynasty
