= Jin Jian (official) =

Korean politician in China (1721–1795)

Minister of Personnel
- In office 22 September 1792 – 13 January 1795 Serving with Liu Yong
- Preceded by: Fuk'anggan
- Succeeded by: Baoning

Minister of Works
- In office 7 November 1791 – 22 September 1792 Serving with Peng Yuanrui
- Preceded by: Fucanggan
- Succeeded by: Helin
- In office 23 August 1783 – 7 November 1791 Serving with Fucanggan
- Preceded by: Liu Yong
- Succeeded by: Peng Yuanrui

Personal details
- Born: 1721
- Died: 13 January 1795 (aged 73–74) (乾隆五十九年十二月丙子)
- Relations: Imperial Noble Consort Shujia (sister); Yunbu (son)
- Parent: Sanboo (father)
- Occupation: politician
- Clan name: Kim (金), later Gingiya (金佳) posthumously
- Courtesy name: Keting (可亭)
- Posthumous name: Qinke (勤恪)

Military service
- Allegiance: Qing dynasty
- Branch/service: Han Chinese Imperial Household Department Plain Yellow Banner; Manchu Plain Yellow Banner (posthumously, in 1799)

Jin Jian

Chinese name
- Traditional Chinese: 金簡; 金鑑
- Simplified Chinese: 金简; 金鉴
Transcriptions
Standard Mandarin
- Hanyu Pinyin: Jīn Jiǎn; Jīn Jiàn

Korean name
- Hangul: 김간; 김감
- Hanja: 金簡; 金鑑
Transcriptions
- Revised Romanization: Gim Gan; Gim Gam
- McCune–Reischauer: Kim Kan; Kim Kam

Manchu name
- Manchu script: ᡤᡳᠨ᠋ᡤᡳᠶᠠᠨ
- Romanization: gingiyan

Jin Jian (1721–13 January 1795), courtesy name Keting (可亭), was a Korean politician of the Qing dynasty. He was an elder brother of Imperial Noble Consort Shujia.

Jin Jian's family was born into the Korean Kim clan, a family originally from Uiju, Joseon. Their ancestor Sandari (三達理) surrendered to the Qing Dynasty during the Qing invasion of Joseon in 1636. They were incorporated into the Han Chinese Imperial Household Department Plain Yellow Banner (內務府漢軍正黃旗).

He had served as the Minister for the Chancery of the Imperial Household Department (總管內務府大臣), vice chief editor of the Siku Quanshu (四庫全書副總裁), Vice Minister of Revenue (戶部侍郎), deputy lieutenant-general of the Han Chinese Bordered Yellow Banner (鑲黃旗漢軍副都統), Minister of Works (工部尚書), lieutenant-general of the Han Chinese Bordered Yellow Banner (鑲黃旗漢軍都統) and Minister of Personnel (吏部尚書). After the Battle of Ngọc Hồi-Đống Đa, Lê Chiêu Thống, the last emperor of Vietnamese Lê dynasty, fled to China for asylum with several high ranking Lê loyalists. Lê Chiêu Thống and high ranking Lê loyalists. These Vietnamese were ordered to move to Beijing and incorporated into the Han Chinese Bordered Yellow Banner. Jin Jian, as the head of the banner, was responsible for getting these men into the banner.

Jin Jian died in 1794. He was given the posthumous name Qinke (勤恪) by Qianlong Emperor. Prince Mianqin was sent to express condolences to him. After his death, Kim family changed their surname to Gingiya (金佳) and transferred to Manchu Plain Yellow Banner in the reign of the Jiaqing Emperor.
