= Yongxuan =

Qing dynasty prince (1746–1832)

- Prince Yi of the First Rank 和碩儀親王

Head of the House of Prince Yi peerage
- Tenure: 1779–1832
- Predecessor: Peerage created
- Successor: Mianzhi
- Born: 31 August 1746
- Died: 1 September 1832 (aged 86)
- Spouse: Lady Janggiya (章佳氏)
- Issue: Mianzhi
Posthumous name
- Prince Yishen of the First Rank (儀慎親王)
- Father: Qianlong Emperor
- Mother: Imperial Noble Consort Shujia

Yongxuan (Chinese: 永璇; 31 August 1746 – 1 September 1832), posthumous name Prince Yishen of the First Rank, was an imperial prince of China's Qing dynasty. He was the Qianlong Emperor's eighth son.

== Life ==
Yongxuan was born on 31 August 1746 at the Palace of Eternal Spring in the Forbidden City. His mother was Noble Consort Jia. He was described as a womanizer and was prone to indulge himself in alcohol.

沉湎酒色，又有腳病。
Indulge in wine, as well as having a foot disease.

In 1775, he took part in the funeral of Empress Xiaoyichun together with his consorts. In 1777, he participated in the funeral of his elder brother, Yongcheng. Yongxuan was granted the title Prince Yi of the Second Rank in 1779. Prince was elevated to Prince Yi of the First Rank in 1797. In 1799, after Heshen's downfall, he was tasked with overseeing a Ministry of Personnel.

Yongxuan died on 1 September 1832, having lived 86 years. Thus, Yongxuan became longest living Qing dynasty imperial prince. He was posthumously honoured as Prince Yishen of the First Rank (仪慎亲王, meaning "virtuous and prudent").

Yongxuan was married to lady Janggiya, daughter of Yengišan. Later, he took his palace maid Wang Yuying as a secondary consort.

== Family ==
Primary Consort

- Imperial Princess Consort Yishen, of the Janggiya clan (仪慎亲王福晋 章佳氏)
  Titles: Consort of the Eighth Prince (八皇子福晋) → Princess Consort Yi of the Second Rank (仪郡王妃) → Princess Consort Yi of the First Rank (仪亲王妃) → Imperial Princess Consort Yishen of the First Rank (仪慎亲王妃)

Secondary Consort

- Yuying, Secondary Consort of the Wang clan (侧福晋 王氏 玉英)
  Titles: Mistress of the Eighth Prince (八皇子格格) → Concubine of Prince Yi of the Second Rank (仪郡王庶妃) → Concubine of Prince Yi of the First Rank (仪亲王庶妃) → Secondary Consort of Prince Yishen of the First Rank (仪慎亲王侧妃)
  - Mianzhi, Prince Yishun of the Second Rank (仪顺郡王 绵志; 3 May 1768 – 19 May 1834), first son
  - Lady of the Second Rank (9 December 1769 – 9 January 1820), first daughter
    - Married Gongsaishang'a of the Barin Borjigin clan in July 1785
  - Second daughter (15 May 1772 – 28 December 1774)
  - Third daughter (19 August 1774 – 13 October 1776)
  - Mianmao (绵懋; 9 February 1776 – 29 November 1777), second son
  - Fourth daughter (5 February 1777 – 8 October 1777)
