= Mianmin =

- Prince Qing of the Second Rank 多羅慶郡王

Head of the House of Prince Qing peerage
- Tenure: 1820–1836
- Predecessor: Yonglin
- Successor: Yicai
- Born: 6 March 1797
- Died: 11 November 1836 (aged 39)
- Spouse: Lady Ezha (額扎氏); Lady Fuca (富察氏)
Names
- Mianmin (綿愍)
Posthumous name
- Prince Qingliang of the Second Rank (慶良郡王)
- House: Aisin Gioro
- Father: Yonglin
- Mother: Lady Wugiya (武佳氏)

Mianmin (Chinese: 綿愍; 6 March 1797 – 11 November 1836), posthumous name Prince Qingliang of the Second Rank, was an imperial prince of the Qing dynasty of China. He was the third son of Yonglin, from whom he succeeded the Prince Qing peerage.

== Life ==
Mianmin was born on 6 March 1797 to Yonglin's second primary consort, lady Wugiya. In 1802, Mianmin was awarded a title of the grace bulwark duke. In February 1816, he arrived late for the banquet at the Palace of Heavenly Purity in the Forbidden City. Prince of the Fourth Rank, Yishao cast his bowl upon the ground and ordered him to take a place. Yonglin's attempt to report the matter via his eunuch was persecuted. In 1819, he was promoted to the prince of the fourth rank. In 1820, Mianmin inherited the Prince Qing peerage as the prince of the second rank because the peerage has not been awarded iron-cap status. In February 1823, he was exempt from overseeing music department of the Yonghe Temple, thus entrusting the internal affairs to Yishao. Mianmin died on 11 November 1836 and was posthumously honoured as "Prince Qingliang of the Second Rank" (庆良郡王, "qingliang" meaning "content and gentle").

As Mianmin's children died prematurely, he adopted Mianzhi's son Yicai as a successor.

== Tomb ==
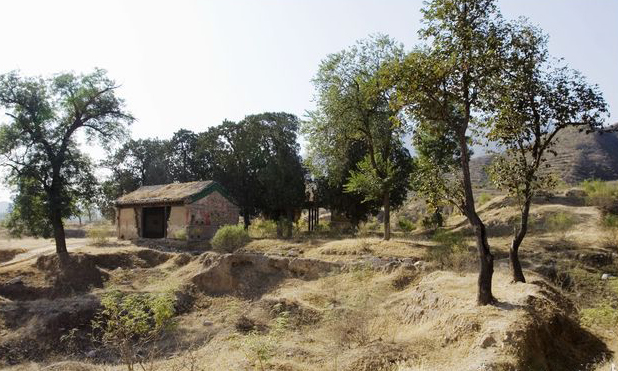
Tomb of the Prince Qingliang of the Second Rank Mianmin in 2019

Mianmin's tomb is located near the family mausoleum of the Prince Qing (Tomb of the White Sheep) in Changping village, where his father was buried. Unlike the Tomb of the White Sheep, the mausoleum is endangered by destruction. The only remaining building is central gate. The stone kurhan on the tomb was razed to the fundament.

== Family ==
Consorts and issue:

- Primary consort, of the Ezha clan (嫡福晋 额扎氏)
- Second primary consort, of the Fuca clan (继福晋 富察氏)
  - Yiyuan (1817–1818), first son
  - Yibin (1827–1833), second son
- Unknown
  - Eldest daughter
    - Married first class taiji Ayuxi (阿玉喜) of Khorchin Borjigit clan

Adopted son: Yicai (1820–1866), held a title of Prince Qing of the Second Rank in 1839-1842
