= Zaizhen =

Chinese prince and politician (1876–1947)

- Prince Qing of the First Rank
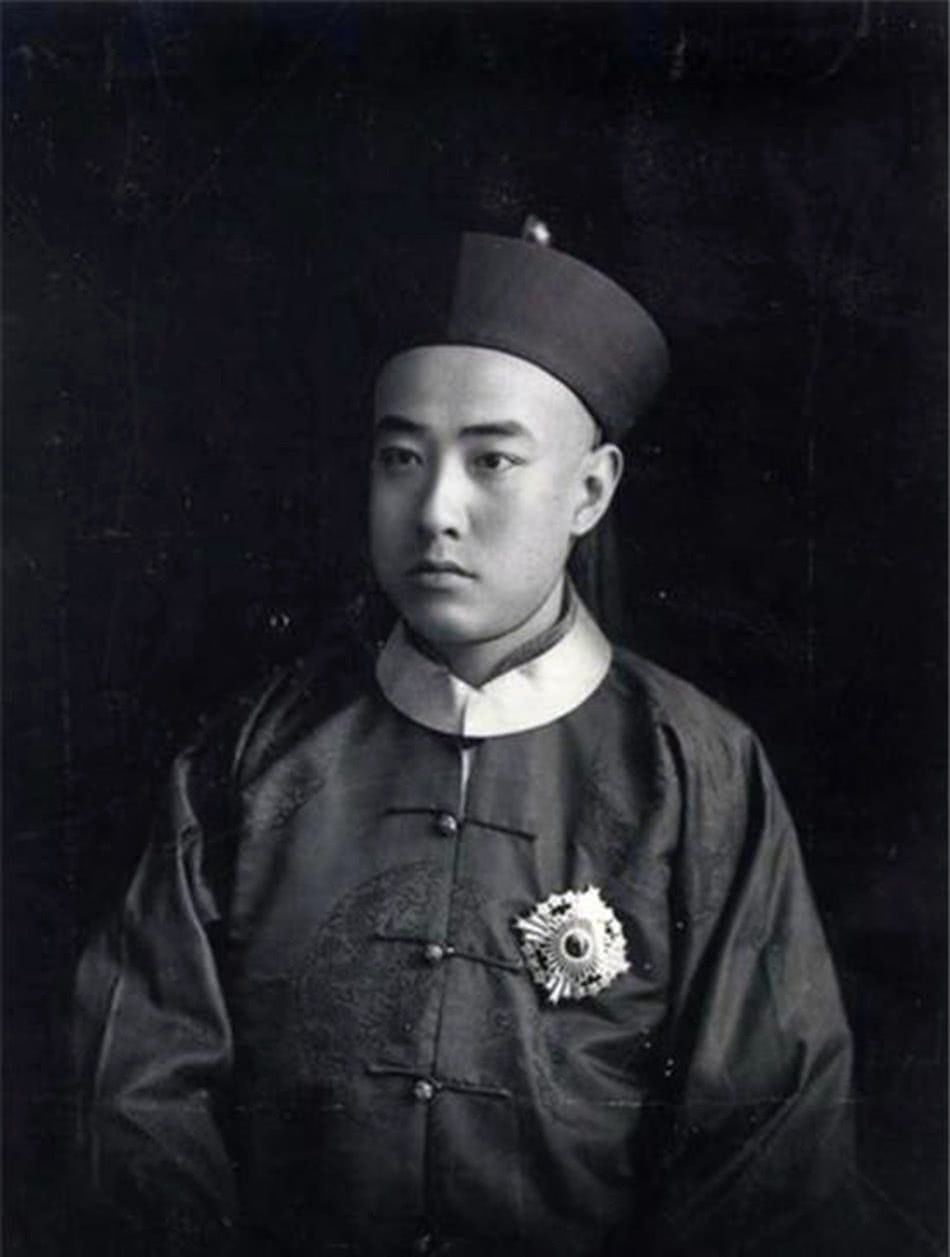
- Zaizhen in the 1910s

Prince Qing of the First Rank
- Tenure: 1917–1945
- Predecessor: Yikuang
- Successor: peerage abolished
- Born: 31 March 1876; Beijing, Qing Empire
- Died: 31 December 1947 (aged 71); Tianjin, Republic of China
- Spouse: Lady Socoro
- Issue: Puzhong; Purui; Pujun; Pugang
Names
- Zaizhen (載振)
Posthumous name
- Prince Qingzhen of the First Rank (慶貞親王)
- House: Aisin Gioro
- Father: Yikuang
- Mother: Lady Hegiya
- Military career
- Allegiance: Qing Dynasty
- Awards: Order of the Paulownia Flowers

Zaizhen
- Traditional Chinese: 載振
- Simplified Chinese: 载振
Transcriptions
Standard Mandarin
- Hanyu Pinyin: Zǎizhèn
- Wade–Giles: Tsai-chen

Yuzhou (courtesy name)
- Chinese: 育周
Transcriptions
Standard Mandarin
- Hanyu Pinyin: Yùzhōu
- Wade–Giles: Yü-chou

Prince Qing
- Traditional Chinese: 慶親王
- Simplified Chinese: 庆亲王
Transcriptions
Standard Mandarin
- Hanyu Pinyin: Qìng Qīnwáng
- Wade–Giles: Ch'ing Chin-wang

Zaizhen (31 March 1876 – 31 December 1947), courtesy name Yuzhou, was a Manchu prince and politician of the late Qing dynasty. Romanised forms of his name include Tsai-chen, Tsai-Chen, Tsai-Cheng.

== Life and service under the Qing dynasty ==
Zaizhen was born in the Aisin Gioro clan as the eldest son of Yikuang during the reign of the Guangxu Emperor. His family was from the Bordered Blue Banner of the Eight Banners. In 1894, Zaizhen was awarded the title of a second class zhenguo jiangjun. Seven years later, he was promoted to beizi.

In 1902, Zaizhen represented the Qing Empire on a diplomatic trip to Great Britain to witness the coronation of King Edward VII. He also visited France, Belgium, Japan and the United States. In 1903, he travelled to Japan to attend the fifth Kangyō Exhibition (勸業博覽會). After returning to China, he actively advocated government reforms and requested for a Ministry of Commerce (商部) to be established. The Qing government approved his request and appointed him as the shangshu (尚書; Secretary) of the ministry. Zaizhen also concurrently held the following appointments: dutong (都統; commander) of the Bordered Blue Banner; yuqian dachen (御前大臣; a senior minister reporting directly to the emperor); zong zuzhang (總族長; clan chief) of the Plain White Banner; head of the Firearms Battalion (火器營).

In 1906, after the Qing government introduced some reforms, Zaizhen, then 30 years old, was appointed as shangshu (尚書; Secretary) of the Ministry of Agriculture, Industry and Commerce (農工商部). His portrait appears on notes issued by The Sin Chun Bank (華商上海信成銀行) in 1907. A year later, the Guangxu Emperor sent him to Hangzhou to supervise the education system there. Along the way, he passed by Shanghai, where he accepted bribes from an official, Duan Zhigui, in return for helping Duan secure the position of xunfu (Provincial Governor) of Heilongjiang. He also had an affair with Yang Cuixi (楊翠喜), a courtesan and drama actress presented to him by Duan Zhigui. Zhao Qilin (趙啟霖), an Inspector-Official (御史), wrote a memorial to the imperial court to accuse Zaizhen of corruption. The incident caused an uproar in the imperial court, which ordered an investigation. However, due to "lack of concrete evidence", the case was closed. Zhao Qilin was charged with making a false report and dismissed from office.

In 1911, Zaizhen was appointed as a guwen dachen (顧問大臣; consultant minister) in the Bideyuan (弼德院; a government body established in May 1911 which provided advice to the emperor). His father, Yikuang, served as the Prime Minister of the Imperial Cabinet from May to November 1911. In 1911 Zaizhen visited Britain to attend the coronation of King George V and Queen Mary.

== Life after the Qing dynasty ==
Zaizhen fled to Shanghai when the Xinhai Revolution, which overthrew the Qing dynasty, broke out in October 1911. He returned to Beijing later. In 1917, after Yikuang's death, Zaizhen inherited his father's princely title, "Prince Qing of the First Rank". He was granted permission to do so by Li Yuanhong, the President of the Republic of China.

In 1924, after Puyi, the Last Emperor who had abdicated in 1912, was forced out of the Forbidden City by the Beiyang Government, Zaizhen feared that he would be implicated so he fled to Shanghai and took shelter in the British concession there. During his time in Shanghai, he invested in various businesses and stayed out of politics.

Zaizhen died in Shanghai in 1947. Cao Rulin, Zhu Zuozhou and others proposed to the Nationalist Government to award Zaizhen the posthumous name zhen (貞; "chaste") to honour him for his role in making Puyi abdicate in 1912, and for abstaining from politics despite having various opportunities to make a political comeback under either the Beiyang Government, Nationalist Government, or the Japanese during the Second Sino-Japanese War. His tombstone reads: Zaizhen, Prince Qingzhen of the First Rank (慶貞親王載振).

== Family ==
Parents

- Father: Yikuang, posthumously known as "Prince Qingmi of the First Rank"
- Mother: Secondary Consort, of the Hegiya clan (大側福晉合佳氏)

Consort and issue

- Primary Consort, of the Socoro clan (嫡福晉索綽羅氏)
  - Puzhong (溥鐘; b. 1898 - d. ?), married a daughter of Grand Secretary (大學士) Natong (那桐)., first son
  - Purui (溥銳; b. 1899 - d. ? ), married another of Natong's daughters, second son
  - Pujun (溥鈞), married a woman of the Erdet (鄂爾德特) clan who was a daughter of Duangong (端恭) and younger sister of Wenxiu, third son
- Secondary Consort, of the Fuca clan (侧福晋富察氏)
  - Pugang (溥钢, b. 1928- d. ?), fourth son
- Secondary Consort, of the Konggiya clan (側福晉孔佳氏)
- Secondary Consort, of the Migiya clan (側福晉米佳氏)
- Secondary Consort, of the Ninggiya clan (福晉甯佳氏)

== See also ==
- Royal and noble ranks of the Qing dynasty
- Ranks of imperial consorts in China#Qing
