= Wang Yuying =

Chinese imperial concubine (died 1805)

Wang Yuying (Chinese: 王玉英; died 1805) was a consort of Yongxuan, the Qianlong Emperor's 8th son. Her family belonged to Plain Yellow Banner of Han ethnicity. She was posthumously accorded the rank of secondary consort (側福晉).

== Life ==
It is not known neither when was Lady Wang born nor when she entered the Manor of Prince Yi as a servant. In 1768, she gave birth to Mianzhi, Yongxuan's first son. At that time, she was awarded a title of mistress. In 1769, Wang Yuying gave birth to the first daughter, later honoured as Lady of the Second Rank. In 1772, she birthed the second daughter, who would die prematurely in 1774. That same year, she birthed the third daughter, who would die prematurely in 1776. In 1775, she gave birth to the second son, Mianmao, who would die prematurely in 1777. In July 1785, her sole surviving daughter married Barin Mongolian prince Gongsaishang'a of the Borjigin clan. Wang Yuying died in 1805 and was posthumously honoured as secondary consort.

== Issue ==
- Prince Yishun of the Second Rank Mianzhi (仪顺郡王 绵志), first son
- Mianmao (绵懋), second son
- Lady of the Second Rank (1769-1834)
  - Married Gongsaishang'a of the Barin Borjigin clan in July 1785
- Second daughter
- Third daughter
- Fourth daughter

== Titles ==
- Lady Wang
- Mistress (庶福晋/诗妾) - from 1768
- Secondary consort (侧福晋) - from 1805 (awarded posthumously)
