= Prince Qing =

Title during the Qing Dynasty (1644-1912)

Prince Qing of the First Rank
- Traditional Chinese: 和碩慶親王
- Simplified Chinese: 和硕庆亲王
Transcriptions
Standard Mandarin
- Hanyu Pinyin: héshuò qìng qīnwáng
- Wade–Giles: ho-shuo ching ch'in-wang

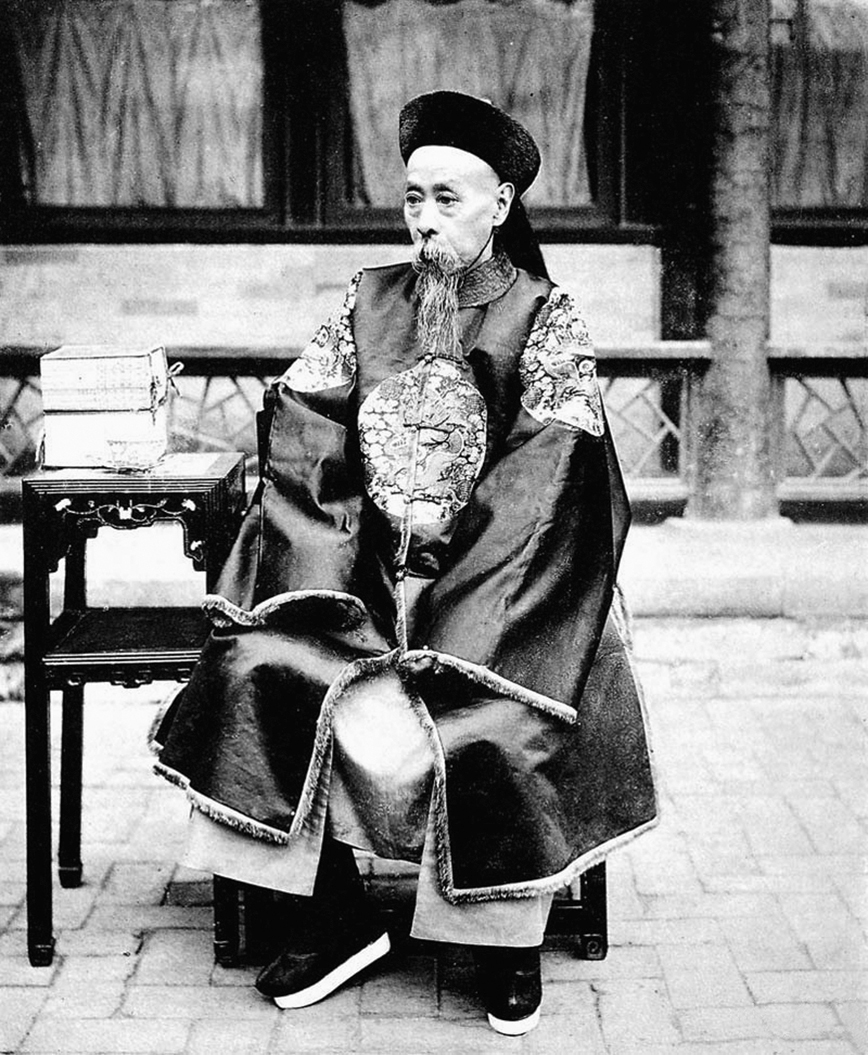
Yikuang (1838–1917), the fourth Prince Qing

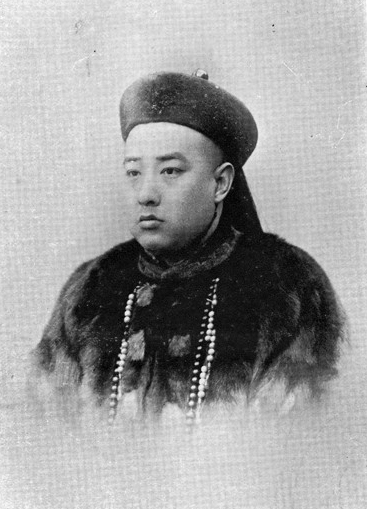
Zaizhen (1876–1947), the fifth Prince Qing

Prince Qing of the First Rank (Manchu: ᡥᠣᡧᠣᡳ
ᡶᡝᠨᡤᠰᡥᡝᠨ
ᠴᡳᠨ ᠸᠠᠩ; hošoi fengšen cin wang), or simply Prince Qing, was the title of a princely peerage used in China during the Manchu-led Qing dynasty (1644–1912). It was also one of the 12 "iron-cap" princely peerages in the Qing dynasty, which meant that the title could be passed down without being downgraded.

The first bearer of the title was Yonglin (1766–1820), the 17th son of the Qianlong Emperor. He was awarded the title by his 15th brother, the Jiaqing Emperor, who succeeded their father. Between 1820 and 1908, the Prince Qing title was capped at a junwang (prince of the second rank) status, which meant that the next bearer of the title would inherit, at most, the title "Prince Qing of the Second Rank". However, from 1908 onwards, the title was accorded a qinwang (prince of the first rank) status. The title was passed down over four generations and held by five princes – three qinwangs and two junwangs.

== Members of the Prince Qing peerage ==
- Yonglin (1766–1820), the Qianlong Emperor's 17th son, initially a beile from 1789 to 1799, promoted to Prince Qing of the Second Rank in 1799 and then to Prince Qing of the First Rank in 1820, posthumously honoured as Prince Qingxi of the First Rank (慶僖親王)
  - Mianmin (綿愍; 1797–1836), Yonglin's third son, held a feng'en fuguo gong title from 1802 to 1819 and a beizi title from 1819 to 1820, held the title Prince Qing of the Second Rank from 1820 to 1836, posthumously honoured as Prince Qingliang of the Second Rank (慶良郡王)
    - Yicai (奕綵; 1820–1866), Mianzhi's son and Mianmin's adoptive son, held the title Prince Qing of the Second Rank from 1837 to 1842, stripped of his title in 1842
  - Mianxing (綿性; 1814–1879), Yonglin's sixth son, held the title of a second class zhenguo jiangjun from 1833 to 1837 and the title of a buru bafen fuguo gong from 1837 to 1842, stripped of his title in 1842
  - Mianti (綿悌; 1811–1849), Yonglin's fifth son, held a buru bafen fuguo gong title from 1831 to 1837, held a buru bafen zhenguo gong title from 1837 to 1842, demoted to a third class zhenguo jiangjun in 1842, posthumously awarded a beizi title in 1852
    - Yikuang (1838–1917), Mianxing's eldest son and Mianti's adoptive son, initially a fuguo jiangjun, promoted to beizi in 1852 and beile in 1860. In 1872, he was awarded the status but not the title of a junwang (second-rank prince). In 1884, he was made Prince Qing of the Second Rank, and was subsequently promoted to Prince Qing of the First Rank in 1894. In 1908, the Prince Qing title was given "iron-cap" status, which meant that the next bearer would be a qinwang (first-rank prince) by default. He was posthumously honoured as Prince Qingmi of the First Rank (慶密親王).
      - Zaizhen (1876–1947), Yikuang's eldest son, held a second class zhenguo jiangjun title from 1894 to 1901 and a beizi title from 1901 to 1917, held the title Prince Qing of the First Rank from 1917 to 1947, posthumously honoured as Prince Qingzhen of the First Rank (慶貞親王)
        - Puzhong (溥鍾), Zaizhen's eldest son, held the title of a buru bafen fuguo gong
        - Purui (溥銳), Zaizhen's second son, held the title of a buru bafen fuguo gong
      - Zaifu (載𢱿), Yikuang's second son, held the title of a second class zhenguo jiangjun from 1906 to 1908, held the title of a buru bafen fuguo gong from 1908 to 1935

== Family tree ==
adoption
Qianlong Emperor 乾隆帝 (1711–1799)
Yongxuan 永璇 (1746–1832); Prince Yishen 儀慎親王 (1779–1832)	Yonglin 永璘 (1766–1820); Prince Qingxi 慶僖親王 (1789–1820)
Mianzhi 綿志 (1768–1834); Prince Yishun (of the Second Rank) 儀順郡王 (1726–1755)	Mianmin 綿愍 (1797–1836); Prince Qingliang (of the Second Rank) 慶良郡王 (1820–1836)	Mianti 綿悌 (1811–1849); Beizi 貝子 (posthumously awarded)	Mianxing 綿性 (1814–1879); Buru Bafen Fuguo Gong 不入八分輔國公 (1837–1842) (stripped of his title)
Yicai 奕綵 (1820–1866); Prince Qing (of the Second Rank) 慶郡王 (1837–1842) (stripped of his title)	Yikuang 奕劻 (1838–1917); Prince Qingmi 慶密親王 (1850–1917)
Zaizhen 載振 (1876–1947); Prince Qingzhen 慶貞親王 (1917–1947)

== See also ==
- Royal and noble ranks of the Qing dynasty
