= Yonglin =

Qing dynasty prince (1766–1820)

- Prince Qing of the First Rank 和碩慶親王

Head of the House of Prince Qing peerage
- Tenure: 1789–1820
- Predecessor: peerage created
- Successor: Mianmin
- Born: 17 June 1766
- Died: 25 April 1820 (aged 53)
- Consorts: Lady Niohuru; Lady Ugiya
- Issue: Mianmin, Prince Qingliang of the Second Rank; Mianti; Mianxing; Lady of the Second Rank
Names
- Yonglin (永璘)
Posthumous name
- Prince Qingxi of the First Rank (慶僖親王)
- House: Aisin Gioro
- Father: Qianlong Emperor
- Mother: Empress Xiaoyichun

Yonglin
- Chinese: 永璘
Transcriptions
Standard Mandarin
- Hanyu Pinyin: Yǒnglín

Yonglin (17 June 1766 – 25 April 1820), posthumous name Prince Qingxi of the First Rank, was an imperial prince of the Qing dynasty of China. He was the 17th and youngest son of the Qianlong Emperor and was a full younger brother of the Jiaqing Emperor.

== Life ==
Yonglin was born in the Aisin-Gioro clan as the 17th and youngest son of the Qianlong Emperor. His mother, Empress Xiaoyichun, also bore the Qianlong Emperor's 15th son, Yongyan (the Jiaqing Emperor); Yonglin and the Jiaqing Emperor were thus full brothers.

In 1775, his birth mother died of illness. He was raised by Noble Consort Ying in Jingren Palace.

In 1789, Yonglin was granted the title of a beile. He was promoted to junwang (second-rank prince) in 1799 under the title "Prince Hui of the Second Rank" (惠郡王), but was later renamed to "Prince Qing of the Second Rank" (慶郡王). The Jiaqing Emperor gave him Heshen's former residence as his personal mansion. In 1820, Yonglin was promoted to qinwang (first-rank prince), hence he was known as "Prince Qing of the First Rank" (慶親王). He died in the same year and was buried somewhere in the present-day Baiyanggou Natural Scenic Area, which is located southwest of Beijing's Changping District.

Around 1851, during the reign of the Xianfeng Emperor, the Imperial Household Department took back the Prince Qing's Mansion from Yonglin's descendants. A year later, the Xianfeng Emperor gave the mansion to his sixth brother, Prince Gong. The mansion, now called the Prince Gong's Mansion, is a museum open to the public.

== Family ==
Primary Consort

- Imperial Princess Consort Qingxi, of the Niohuru clan (慶僖亲王福晋 鈕祜祿氏; d. 1801)
  - Mianheng (綿恆; 25 January 1790 – 10 February 1790), first son
  - Second son (8 August 1793 – 24 August 1795)
  - Second daughter (26 July 1796 – 9 August 1801)
- Step Imperial Princess Consort Qingxi, of the Ugiya clan (慶僖亲王福晋 武佳氏, d. 1823)
  - Mianmin, Prince Qingliang of the Second Rank (慶良郡王 綿慜; 6 March 1797 – 11 November 1836), third son

Secondary Consort

- Secondary consort, of the Taogiya clan (側福晉 陶佳氏)
  - Fourth son (27 February 1809)
  - Mianti, Prince of the Fourth Rank (貝子 綿悌; 23 July 1811 – 25 December 1849), fifth son
  - Mianxing, Duke of the Fourth Rank (不入八分輔國公 綿性; 30 January 1814 – 15 March 1879), sixth son
  - Sixth daughter (25 July 1815 – 23 February 1818)

Concubine

- Mistress, of the Janggiya clan (張佳氏)
  - Lady of the Second Rank (縣君; b. 8 January 1788), first daughter
    - Married Zhalawaduo'erji (扎拉瓦多爾濟) of the Tumed in December 1805 or January 1806
- Mistress, of the Li clan (李氏; d. 1820)
  - Third daughter (28 November 1804 – 1 June 1807)
  - Princess of the Third Rank (郡主; 23 September 1813 – 12 August 1820), fifth daughter
- Mistress, of the Sun clan (孫氏)
  - Fourth daughter (12 October 1811 – 7 May 1813)
- Mistress, of the Zhao clan (趙氏)
  - Seventh daughter (b. 8 September 1817)
    - Married Sanzhaxili (三扎喜裡) of the Kharchin Wulianghaijileimote (烏亮海吉勒莫特) clan in December 1835 or January 1836

== In fiction and popular culture ==
- Portrayed by Jonathan Cheung in Succession War (2018)

== See also ==
- Prince Qing
- Royal and noble ranks of the Qing dynasty
