= Yikuang =

Manchu noble and politician (1838–1917)

- Prince Qing of the First Rank
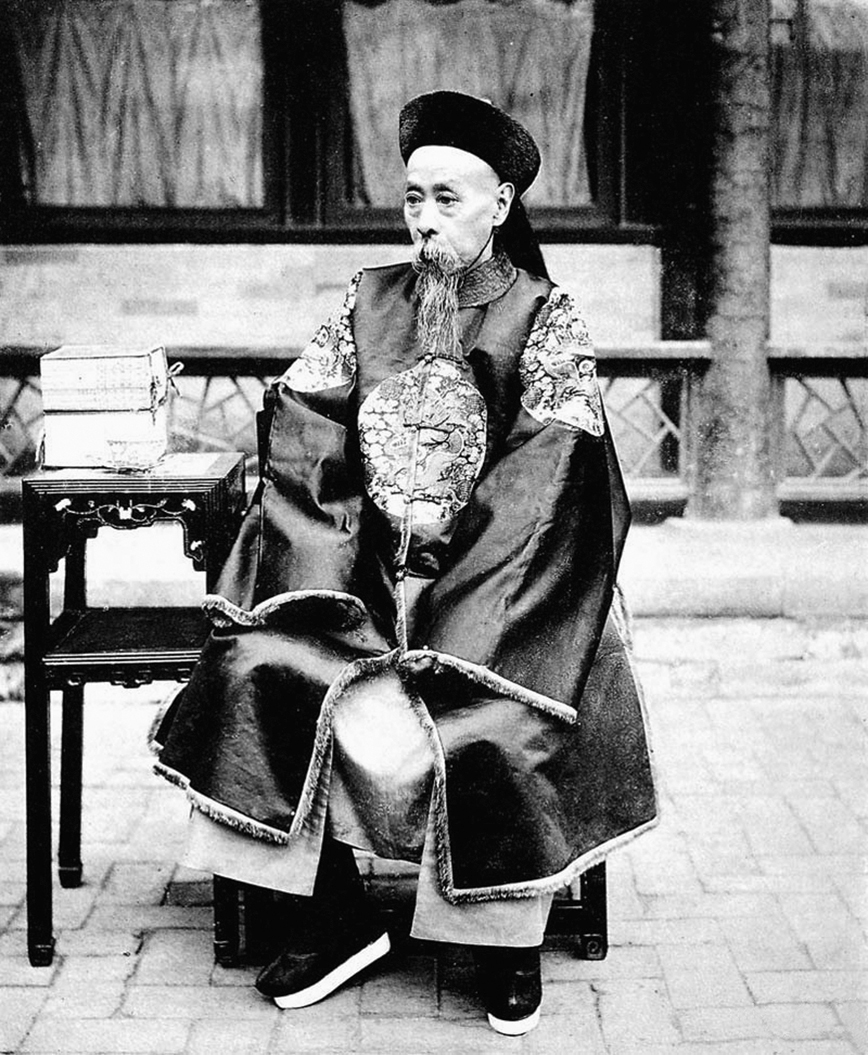
- Photo of Yikuang.

Prince Qing of the First Rank
- Tenure: 1850 – 28 January 1917
- Predecessor: Mianti (Prince of the Fourth Rank)
- Successor: Zaizhen

1st Prime Minister of the Imperial Cabinet
- Tenure: 8 May 1911 – 1 November 1911
- Predecessor: Position established
- Successor: Yuan Shikai
- Emperor: Xuantong Emperor

Chief Grand Councillor
- Tenure: 11 April 1903 – 8 May 1911
- Predecessor: Ronglu
- Successor: Position abolished
- Emperor: Guangxu Emperor; Xuantong Emperor
- Born: 24 March 1838; Beijing, Qing Empire
- Died: 28 January 1917 (aged 78); Beijing, Republic of China
- Spouse: Lady Hegiya; Lady Liugiya another four consorts
- Issue: Zaizhen; Zaibo; Zailun three other sons 12 daughters
Posthumous name
- Prince Qingmi of the First Rank (慶密親王)
- House: Aisin Gioro
- Father: Mianxing

Yikuang
- Chinese: 奕劻
Transcriptions
Standard Mandarin
- Hanyu Pinyin: Yìkuāng

Prince Qing
- Traditional Chinese: 慶親王
- Simplified Chinese: 庆亲王
Transcriptions
Standard Mandarin
- Hanyu Pinyin: Qìng Qīnwáng
- Wade–Giles: Ch'ing Chin-wang

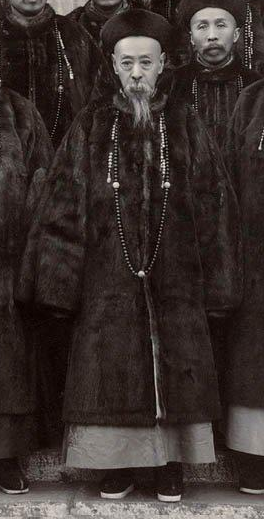
Yikuang

Yikuang (Manchu: ᡳ ᡴᡠᠸᠠᠩ I-kuwang; 24 March 1838 – 28 January 1917), formally known as Prince Qing (or Prince Ch'ing), was a Manchu noble and politician of the Qing dynasty. He served as the first Prime Minister of the Imperial Cabinet, an office created in May 1911 to replace the Grand Council.

== Early life and career ==
Yikuang was born in the Aisin-Gioro clan as the eldest son of Mianxing (綿性), a lesser noble who held the title of a buru bafen fuguo gong. He was adopted by his uncle, Mianti (綿悌), who held the title of a third class zhenguo jiangjun. His grandfather was Yonglin, the 17th son of the Qianlong Emperor and the first in line in the Prince Qing peerage, one of the 12 "iron-cap" princely peerages of the Qing dynasty.

Yikuang inherited the title of a fuguo jiangjun in 1850 and was promoted to beizi in 1852. In January 1860, the Xianfeng Emperor further elevated Yikuang to the status of a beile. In October 1872, after the Tongzhi Emperor married Empress Xiaozheyi, he promoted Yikuang to a junwang (second-rank prince) and appointed him as a yuqian dachen (御前大臣; a senior minister reporting directly to the emperor).

== Service under the Guangxu Emperor ==
In March 1884, during the Guangxu Emperor's reign, Yikuang was put in charge of the Zongli Yamen (the de facto foreign affairs ministry) and given the title "Prince Qing of the Second Rank" (慶郡王). In September 1885, he was tasked with assisting Prince Chun in overseeing maritime and naval affairs. In February 1886, he was awarded the privilege of entering the inner imperial court to meet the emperor. In January 1889, he was given an additional appointment: you zongzheng (右宗正; Right Director of the Imperial Clan Court). After the Guangxu Emperor married Empress Xiaodingjing in 1889, he granted additional privileges to Yikuang. In 1894, when Empress Dowager Cixi celebrated her 60th birthday, she issued an edict promoting Yikuang to the status of a qinwang (first-rank prince); thereafter Yikuang was formally known as "Prince Qing of the First Rank".

Around October 1894, during the First Sino-Japanese War, Yikuang was appointed to the positions of high commissioner of the admiralty, head of the Zongli Yamen, and head of war operations, with the latter becoming a quasi-general headquarters.

Yikuang was involved in the "sale" of official positions, in which a person could obtain an official post through the prince's recommendation by paying him a certain sum of money. He became a "go-to person" for backroom deals in politics.

During the Boxer Rebellion from 1899 to 1901, Yikuang was more sympathetic towards the foreigners whereas Zaiyi (Prince Duan) sided with the Boxers against the foreigners. Two factions were formed in the Qing imperial court: a "moderate" pro-foreign group, led by Yikuang, and a xenophobic group headed by Zaiyi. Yikuang was discredited for his pro-foreign stance in June 1900, when a multi-national military force (the Seymour Expedition) marched from Tianjin towards Beijing. He was immediately replaced by the "reactionary" Zaiyi as head of the Zongli Yamen. Qing imperial forces and Boxers, acting under Zaiyi's command, defeated Seymour's first expedition. Yikuang even wrote letters to foreigners, inviting them to take shelter in the Zongli Yamen's offices during the Siege of the International Legations by Zaiyi's men. Another pro-foreign general, Ronglu, offered to provide escorts to the foreigners when his soldiers were supposed to be killing foreigners. Yikuang and Zaiyi's forces clashed several times. Yikuang ordered his own Bannermen to attack the Boxers and the Kansu Braves.

Yikuang was then sent by Empress Dowager Cixi, along with Li Hongzhang, to negotiate for peace with the Eight-Nation Alliance after they invaded Beijing in 1901. Yikuang and Li Hongzhang signed the Boxer Protocol on 7 September 1901. During the conference, Yikuang was seen as a representative while the actual negotiations were done by Li Hongzhang. Returning to Beijing as a senior member of the imperial court, Yikuang persisted in his old ways, and was despised not only by reformers, but also by moderate court officials.

In June 1901, the Zongli Yamen was converted to the Waiwubu (外務部; foreign affairs ministry), with Yikuang still in charge of it. In December, Yikuang's eldest son, Zaizhen, was made a beizi. In discussions over Manchuria, Yikuang "was bolder in resisting the Russians [than Li Hongzhang], though he was in the last resort weak and unable to hold out against pressure. The Japanese regarded him as a 'nonentity' but this judgment may have been influenced by the fact that he did not often accept their advice." He was also appointed to the Grand Council in March 1903. Later that year, he was put in charge of the finance and defence ministries – in addition to his position as head of the foreign affairs ministry. However, he was also relieved of his duties as a yuqian dachen (御前大臣) and replaced by his eldest son, Zaizhen.

After the Guangxu Emperor died on 14 November 1908, Empress Dowager Cixi chose Zaifeng (Prince Chun)'s two-year-old son, Puyi, to be the new emperor. Puyi was "adopted" into the emperor's lineage, hence he was nominally no longer Zaifeng's son. Empress Dowager Cixi died on the following day.

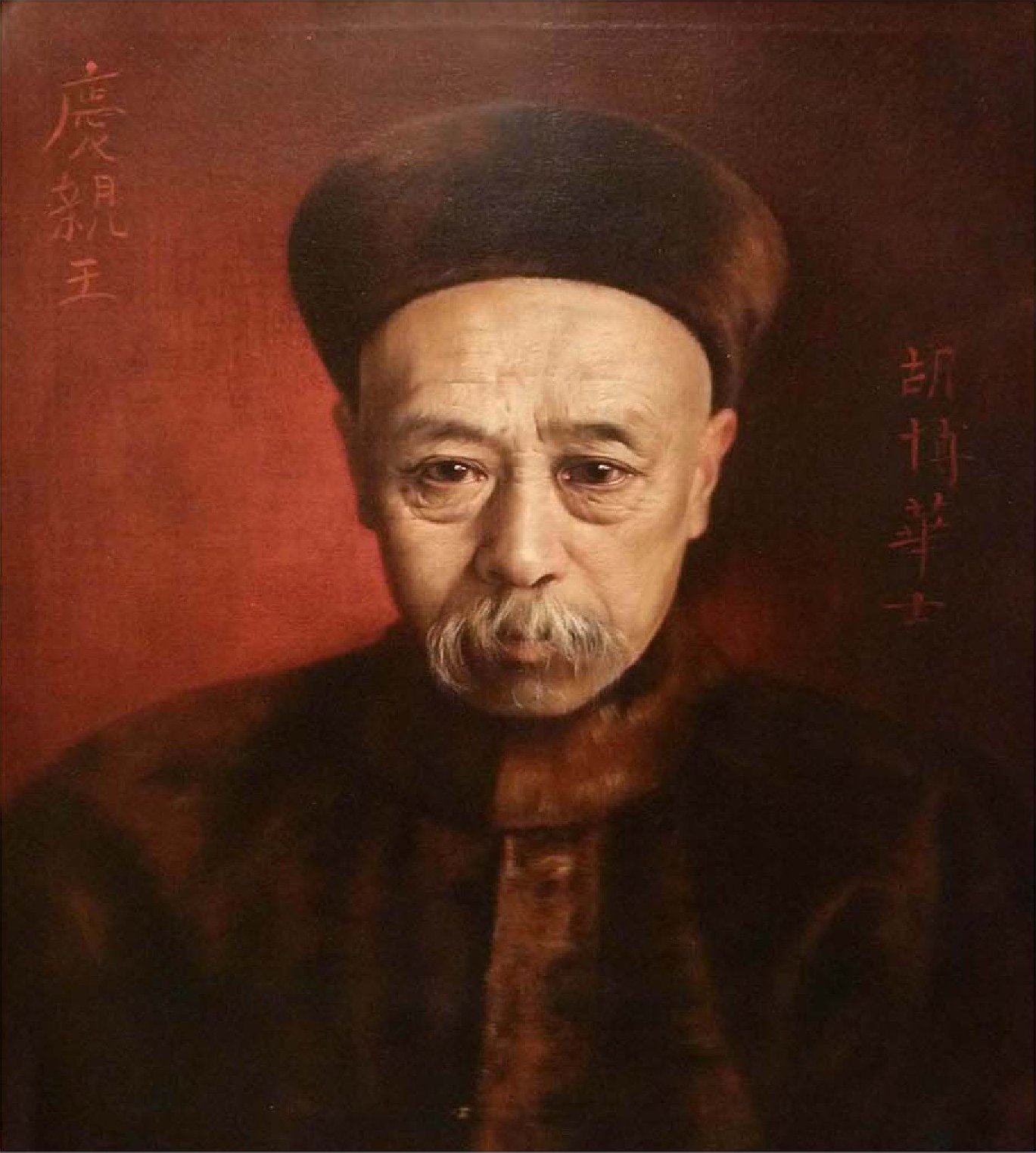
Painting of Yikuang, 1898–1899.

== Service under the Xuantong Emperor ==
Puyi ascended the throne as the Xuantong Emperor, with his biological father, Zaifeng (Prince Chun), serving as regent. In 1911, Zaifeng abolished the Grand Council and replaced it with an "Imperial Cabinet", after which he appointed Yikuang as the Prime Minister of the Imperial Cabinet (內閣總理大臣).

When the Wuchang Uprising broke out in October 1911, Yikuang stepped down as Prime Minister, offering his position to Yuan Shikai instead, and appointed himself as the Chief Executive of the Bideyuan (弼德院; a government body established in May 1911 which provided advice to the emperor). Yikuang and Yuan Shikai persuaded Empress Dowager Longyu (Empress Xiaodingjing) to abdicate on behalf of the Xuantong Emperor. The empress dowager heeded their advice in February 1912.

== Life after the fall of the Qing dynasty ==
After the fall of the Qing dynasty and the establishment of the Republic of China, Yikuang and his eldest son, Zaizhen, amassed a fortune and moved from Beijing to the British concession in Tianjin. They later moved back to the Prince Qing Residence (慶王府) at No. 3, Dingfu Street in Beijing's Xicheng District.

Yikuang died of illness in 1917 in his residence. Puyi awarded him the posthumous title "Prince Qingmi of the First Rank" (慶密親王). In the same year, Li Yuanhong, the President of the Republic of China, gave Zaizhen permission to inherit the Prince Qing peerage.

== Family ==
Consort and issue:

- Primary Consort, of the Bolod clan (嫡福晉博羅特氏)
  - Zaiyu (郡主 載揄;b. 21 February 1863), Princess of the Third Rank, first daughter
    - Married Nayantu (那彦图) of the Khalka Borjigin clan in 1885
- Secondary Consort, of the Hegiya clan (大側福晉合佳氏)
  - Zairong (郡君 載搈;b.2 December 1875), Lady of the First Rank, second daughter
    - Married Shiliang (世梁) of the Wumit clan (伍弥特氏) in 1898
  - Zaizhen (慶密親王载振; 31 March 1876 – 31 December 1947), Prince Qingmi of the First Rank, first son
  - Zaishu (熙九太太 載抒; b.19 December 1878), Madam Xijiu, fourth daughter
    - Married Xijun (熙俊) of the Hitara clan in 1900
- Secondary Consort, of the Jingiya clan (側福晋金佳氏)
  - Zaihuan (載換;b.7 December 1876), third daughter
    - Married Deheng (德恒) of the Yehe Nara clan in 1896
  - Zaikui (郡君 载揆), Lady of the First Rank, sixth daughter
    - Married Liangkui (良葵) of the Guwalgiya clan in 1906
- Secondary Consort, of the Liugiya clan (側福晉劉佳氏)
  - Fifth Daughter (25 July 1882)
  - Seventh Daughter (18 March 1886)
  - Zaibo (鎮國將軍 載搏; 1887 – 1935), General of the First Rank, second son
  - Zailun (載掄;d.1950), fifth son
  - Tenth Daughter (21 December 1892 – 1899)
- Secondary Consort, of the Ligiya clan (側福晉李佳氏)
  - Eighth Daughter (b.1890)
    - Married Shijie (世杰) of the Magiya clan 1911
  - Ninth Daughter
  - Zaikui (载揆; b.1897), Courtesy name Zi Zhiqing (字芝卿), eleventh daughter
    - Married Hanluozhabu (汉罗扎布) of the Kharchin Ulanghaijilmot clan (乌亮海吉勒莫特氏) in 1921
  - Twelfth Daughter (1898)
- Unknown
  - Zaishou (载授), third son
  - Fourth son
  - Zaipu (載镨), sixth son

== See also ==
- Royal and noble ranks of the Qing dynasty
- Ranks of imperial consorts in China#Qing

Yikuang Qing dynasty Born: February 1836 Died: January 1917
Political offices
New title Office created	Prime Minister of the Imperial Cabinet; 8 May 1911 – 1 November 1911	Succeeded by Yuan Shikai
