= Mianzhi =

- Prince Yi of the Second Rank 多羅儀郡王

Head of the House of Prince Yi peerage
- Tenure: 1832–1834
- Predecessor: Yongxuan
- Successor: Yiyin (奕絪)
- Born: 3 May 1768
- Died: 19 May 1834 (aged 66)
- Spouse: Lady Guwalgiya (瓜爾佳氏)
- Issue: Yiji (奕績); Yiyin (奕絪); Yicai (奕綵)
Posthumous name
- Prince Yishun of the Second Rank (儀順郡王)
- Father: Yongxuan
- Mother: Wang Yuying

Mianzhi (Chinese: 綿志; 3 May 1768 – 19 May 1834), posthumous name Prince Yishun of the Second Rank, was an imperial prince of China's Qing dynasty. He was the second generation of the Prince Yi peerage, succeeding his father Yongxuan.

== Life ==
Mianzhi was born on 3 May 1768 as the eldest son of Yongxuan. His mother was Wang Yuying, a servant in the prince's manor.

He was holding a title of lesser bulwark duke until 1803, when he was promoted to the prince of the fourth rank. His deceased biological mother was bestowed a title of secondary consort in 1805. In 1809, he was granted a title of third-ranking prince. He had a status of Prince of the Second Rank in two terms: 1813-1815 and 1819-1823. In 1832, he inherited a peerage as a junwang. Mianzhi died on 19 May 1834 and was posthumously conferred a title "Prince Yishun of the Second Rank (多罗仪顺郡王, "yishun" meaning "virtuous and obedient").

== Family ==
- Primary consort, of the Gūwalgiya clan (嫡福晋瓜尔佳氏)
  - First son
  - Second son
- Secondary consort, of the Ligiya clan (侧福晋 李佳氏)
  - Lesser Bulwark Duke Yiji, third son
  - Prince of the Third Rank Yiyin, fourth son
- Mistress, of the Li clan (庶福晋 李氏)
- Mistress, of the An clan (庶福晋 安氏)
  - Yicai, fifth son adopted by Mianmin into Prince Qing peerage
