= Prince Yi (created 1797) =

Prince Yi of the First Rank

Chinese name
- Traditional Chinese: 和碩儀親王
- Simplified Chinese: 和硕仪亲王
Transcriptions
Standard Mandarin
- Hanyu Pinyin: héshuò yí qīnwáng
- Wade–Giles: ho-shuo i ch'in-wang

Manchu name
- Manchu script: ᡥᠣᡧᠣᡳ ᠶᠣᠩᠰᠣ ᠴᡳᠨ ᠸᠠᠩ
- Romanization: hošoi yongso cin wang

Prince Yi of the First Rank, or simply Prince Yi, was the title of a princely peerage used in China during the Manchu-led Qing dynasty (1644–1912). As the Prince Yi peerage was not awarded "iron-cap" status, this meant that each successive bearer of the title would normally start off with a title downgraded by one rank vis-à-vis that held by his predecessor. However, the title would generally not be downgraded to any lower than a feng'en fuguo gong except under special circumstances.

The first bearer of the title was Yongxuan (永璇; 1746–1832), the Qianlong Emperor's eighth son, who was made "Prince Yi of the First Rank" in 1797. The title was passed down over seven generations and held by seven persons.

== Members of the Prince Yi peerage ==
Members of the Prince Yi peerage
- Yongxuan (永璇; 1746–1832), the Qianlong Emperor's eighth son, held the title Prince Yi of the Second Rank from 1779 to 1797, promoted to Prince Yi of the First Rank in 1797, posthumously honoured as Prince Yishen of the First Rank (儀慎親王)
  - Mianzhi (綿志; 1768–1834), Yongxuan's eldest son, held the title of a buru bafen fuguo gong from 1799 to 1803, promoted to beizi in 1803 and then to beile in 1809, made an acting junwang in 1813, stripped of his title in 1815 and 1823 but restored again in 1819 and 1823, inherited the Prince Yi peerage in 1832, posthumously honoured as Prince Yishun of the Second Rank (儀順郡王)
    - Yiyin (奕絪; 1817–1893), Mianzhi's fourth son, held the title of a feng'en fuguo gong from 1800 to 1801, inherited the Prince Yi peerage in 1801 as a beile, made an acting junwang in 1884
      - Zaihuan (載桓; 1838–1859), Yiyin's eldest son, posthumously honoured as a beizi
        - Puyi (溥頤; 1858–?), Zaihuan's son
          - Yukun (毓崐; 1875–1901), Puyi's eldest son, held the title of a beizi from 1884 to 1901, posthumously made an acting beile, had no male heir
          - Yuqi (毓岐; 1883–1916), Puyi's fifth son, held the title of a feng'en zhenguo gong from 1901 to 1916
            - Hengyue (恆鉞; 1911–?), Yuqi's eldest son, held the title of a feng'en zhenguo gong from 1917
    - Yiji (奕績; 1798–1813), Mianzhi's third son, posthumously honoured as a buru bafen fuguo gong in 1813

== Family tree ==
Family of Prince Yi (created 1797)

Yongxuan 永璇 (1746–1832); Prince Yishen of the First Rank 儀慎親王 (1797–1832)
Mianzhi 綿志 (1768–1834); Prince Yishun of the Second Rank 儀順郡王 (1832–1834)
Yiji 奕績 (1798–1813); Buru Bafen Fuguo Gong 不入八分輔國公 (posthumously awarded)	Yiyin 奕絪 (1817–1893); Beile and Acting Junwang 郡王銜貝勒 (1884–1893)
Zaihuan 載桓 (1838–1859); Beizi 貝子 (posthumously awarded)
Puyi 溥頤 (1858–?)
Yukun 毓崐 (1875–1901); Beizi and Acting Beile 貝勒銜貝子 (1884–1901)	Yuqi 毓岐 (1883–1916); Feng'en Zhenguo Gong 奉恩鎮國公 (1901–1916)
Hengyue 恆鉞 (1911–?); Feng'en Zhenguo Gong 奉恩鎮國公 (1917–?)

== See also ==
- Royal and noble ranks of the Qing dynasty
