= Qianlong Emperor =

Emperor of China from 1735 to 1796

Qianlong Emperor 乾隆帝
- Official portrait, 1736

Emperor of the Qing dynasty
- Reign: 18 October 1735 – 9 February 1796
- Predecessor: Yongzheng Emperor
- Successor: Jiaqing Emperor

Emperor Emeritus of the Qing dynasty
- Tenure: 9 February 1796 – 7 February 1799

Prince Bao of the First Rank
- Tenure: 20 March 1733 – 8 October 1735
- Born: 25 September 1711; Prince Yong's Mansion (in present-day Beijing)
- Died: 7 February 1799 (aged 87); Yangxin Hall, Forbidden City (in present-day Beijing)
- Burial: Yu Mausoleum, Eastern Qing tombs
- Consorts: Empress Xiaoxianchun (m. 1727; died 1748) Empress Nara (m. 1734; died 1766) Empress Xiaoyichun (m. 1745; died 1775)
- Issue Detail: Yonghuang, Prince Ding'an of the First Rank; Yonglian, Crown Prince Duanhui; Princess Hejing of the First Rank; Yongzhang, Prince Xun of the Second Rank; Yongcheng, Prince Lüduan of the First Rank; Yongqi, Prince Rongchun of the First Rank; Yongrong, Prince Zhizhuang of the First Rank; Princess Hejia of the Second Rank; Yongxuan, Prince Yishen of the First Rank; Yongxing, Prince Chengzhe of the First Rank; Princess Hejing of the First Rank; Princess Heke of the Second Rank; Jiaqing Emperor; Yonglin, Prince Qingxi of the First Rank; Princess Hexiao of the First Rank
Names
- Hongli (弘曆); Manchu: Hung li (ᡥᡠᠩ ᠯᡳ)
Era dates
- Qianlong (乾隆): 12 February 1736 – 8 February 1796; Manchu: Abkai wehiyehe (ᠠᠪᡴᠠᡳ ᠸᡝᡥᡳᠶᡝᡥᡝ); Mongolian: Тэнгэр тэтгэгч (ᠲᠩᠷᠢ ᠲᠡᠳᠬᠦᠭᠴᠢ)
Posthumous name
- Emperor Fatian Longyun Zhicheng Xianjue Tiyuan Liji Fuwen Fenwu Qinming Xiaoci Shensheng Chun (法天隆運至誠先覺體元立極敷文奮武欽明孝慈神聖純皇帝); Manchu: Abka be Alhūdaha, Forgon be Wesihun Obuha, Ten -i Unenggi, Nenden Sarasu, Ikengge be Dursulehe, Ten be Ilibuha, Šu Selgiyehe, Horon Badarambuha, Hiyoošungga Jilangga Šengge Enduringge Yongkiyangga Hūwangdi (ᠠᠪᡴᠠ ᠪᡝ ᠠᠯᡥᡡᡩᠠᡥᠠ᠈ ᡶᠣᡵᡤᠣᠨ ᠪᡝ ᠸᡝᠰᡳᡥᡠᠨ ᠣᠪᡠᡥᠠ᠈ ᡨᡝᠨ ᡳ ᡠᠨᡝᠩᡤᡳ᠈ ᠨᡝᠨᡩᡝᠨ ᠰᠠᡵᠠᠰᡠ᠈ ᡳᡴᡝᠩᡤᡝ ᠪᡝ ᡩᡠᡵᠰᡠᠯᡝᡥᡝ᠈ ᡨᡝᠨ ᠪᡝ ᡳᠯᡳᠪᡠᡥᠠ᠈ ᡧᡠ ᠰᡝᠯᡤᡳᠶᡝᡥᡝ᠈ ᡥᠣᡵᠣᠨ ᠪᠠᡩᠠᡵᠠᠮᠪᡠᡥᠠ᠈ ᡥᡳᠶᠣᠣᡧᡠᠩᡤᠠ ᠵᡳᠯᠠᠩᡤᠠ ᡧᡝᠩᡤᡝ ᡝᠨᡩᡠᡵᡳᠩᡤᡝ ᠶᠣᠩᡴᡳᠶᠠᠩᡤᠠ ᡥᡡᠸᠠᠩᡩᡳ)
Temple name
- Gaozong (高宗); Manchu: G'aodzung (ᡬᠠᠣᡯᡠᠩ)
- House: Aisin Gioro
- Dynasty: Qing
- Father: Yongzheng Emperor
- Mother: Empress Xiaoshengxian
- Seal (Note: Chenhan (宸翰) seal used for calligraphy and handwritten works)

Chinese name
- Traditional Chinese: 乾隆帝
- Simplified Chinese: 乾隆帝
Transcriptions
Standard Mandarin
- Hanyu Pinyin: Qiánlóng Dì
- Wade–Giles: Chʻien^{2}-lung^{2} Ti^{4}
- IPA: [tɕʰjɛ̌nlʊ̌ŋ tî]
Yue: Cantonese
- Yale Romanization: Kìhnlùhng Dai
- Jyutping: Kin4-lung4 Dai3
- IPA: [kʰin˩.lʊŋ˩ tɐj˧]

The Qianlong Emperor (25 September 1711 – 7 February 1799), also known by his temple name Emperor Gaozong of Qing, personal name Hongli, was the fifth emperor of the Qing dynasty and the fourth Qing emperor to rule over China proper. He reigned officially from 1735 until his abdication and retirement in 1796, but retained ultimate power subsequently until his death in 1799, making him one of history's longest-reigning and longest-lived monarchs.

The fourth and favourite son of the Yongzheng Emperor, Qianlong ascended the throne in 1735. A highly ambitious military leader, he led a series of campaigns into Inner Asia, Burma, Nepal and Vietnam and suppressed rebellions in Jinchuan and Taiwan. The most significant of the campaigns conquered Xinjiang from the Dzungar Khanate. He ordered the Dzungar genocide. He was given the honorific title Emperor Manjushri in Qing Tibet. Domestically, Qianlong was a major patron of the arts and a prolific writer. He sponsored the compilation of the Siku Quanshu (Complete Library of the Four Treasuries), the largest collection ever made of Chinese history, and oversaw extensive literary inquisitions that suppressed some 3,100 works.

In 1796, Qianlong abdicated after a 60 year reign to allow his grandfather, the Kangxi Emperor, to remain the longest-reigning Qing emperor at 61 years. Even after being succeeded by his son, the Jiaqing Emperor, Qianlong continued to rule as Emperor Emeritus until dying in 1799 at the age of 87.

Qianlong ruled at the end of the High Qing era, the zenith of the dynasty's power, influence, and prosperity. At the same time, military weakness after constant warfare, endemic corruption, inefficiency in the imperial court and a stagnating civil society ushered in the gradual decline and ultimate demise of the Qing empire.

== Early years ==
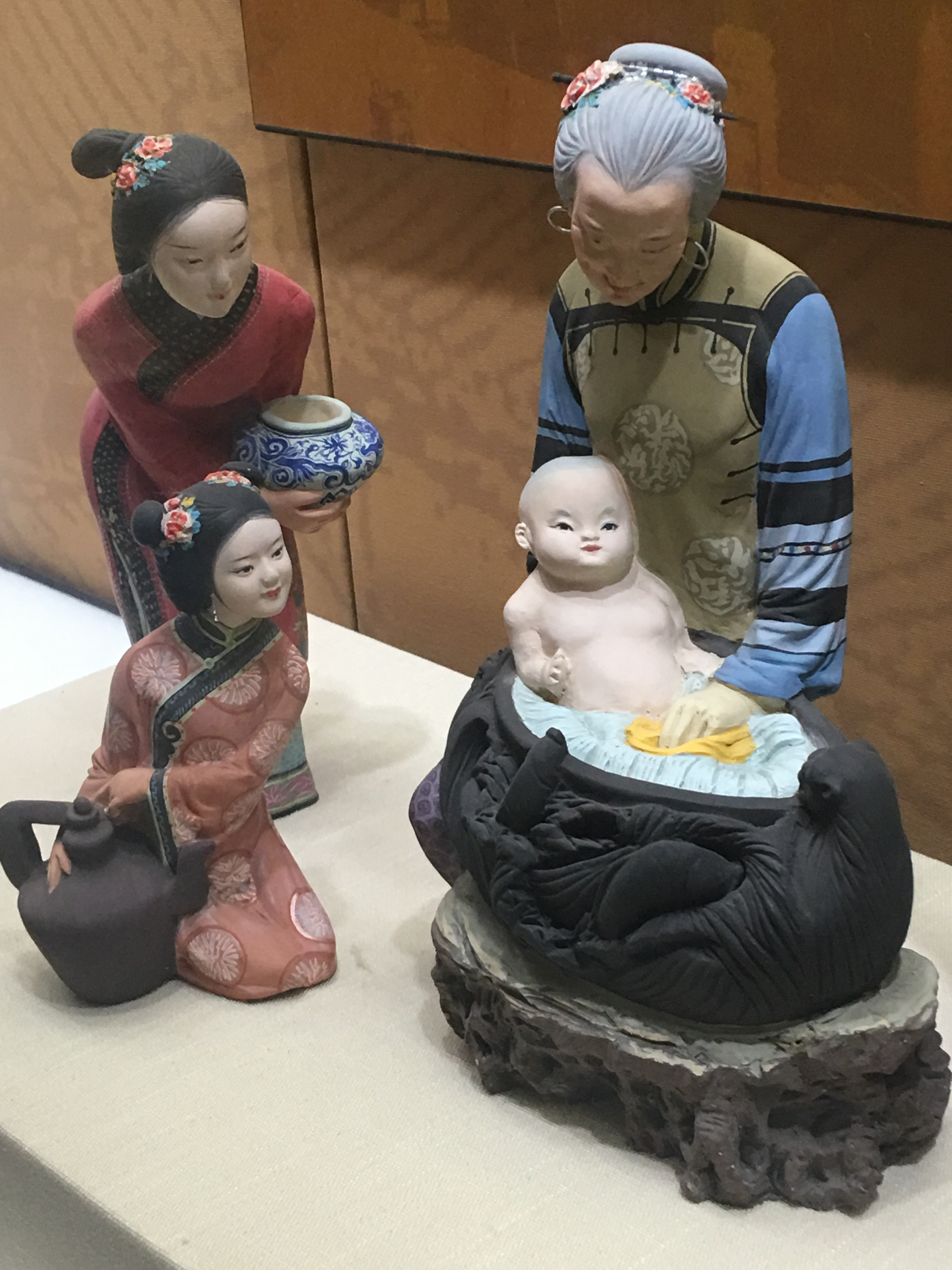
Figurine of the three-year-old Qianlong Emperor having a bath. Artefact in Yonghe Temple, Beijing.

Hongli was the fourth son of the Yongzheng Emperor and was born to Noble Consort Xi. Hongli was adored by both his grandfather, the Kangxi Emperor, and his father, the Yongzheng Emperor. Some historians argue that the main reason why the Kangxi Emperor appointed the Yongzheng Emperor as his successor was because Hongli was his favorite grandson.

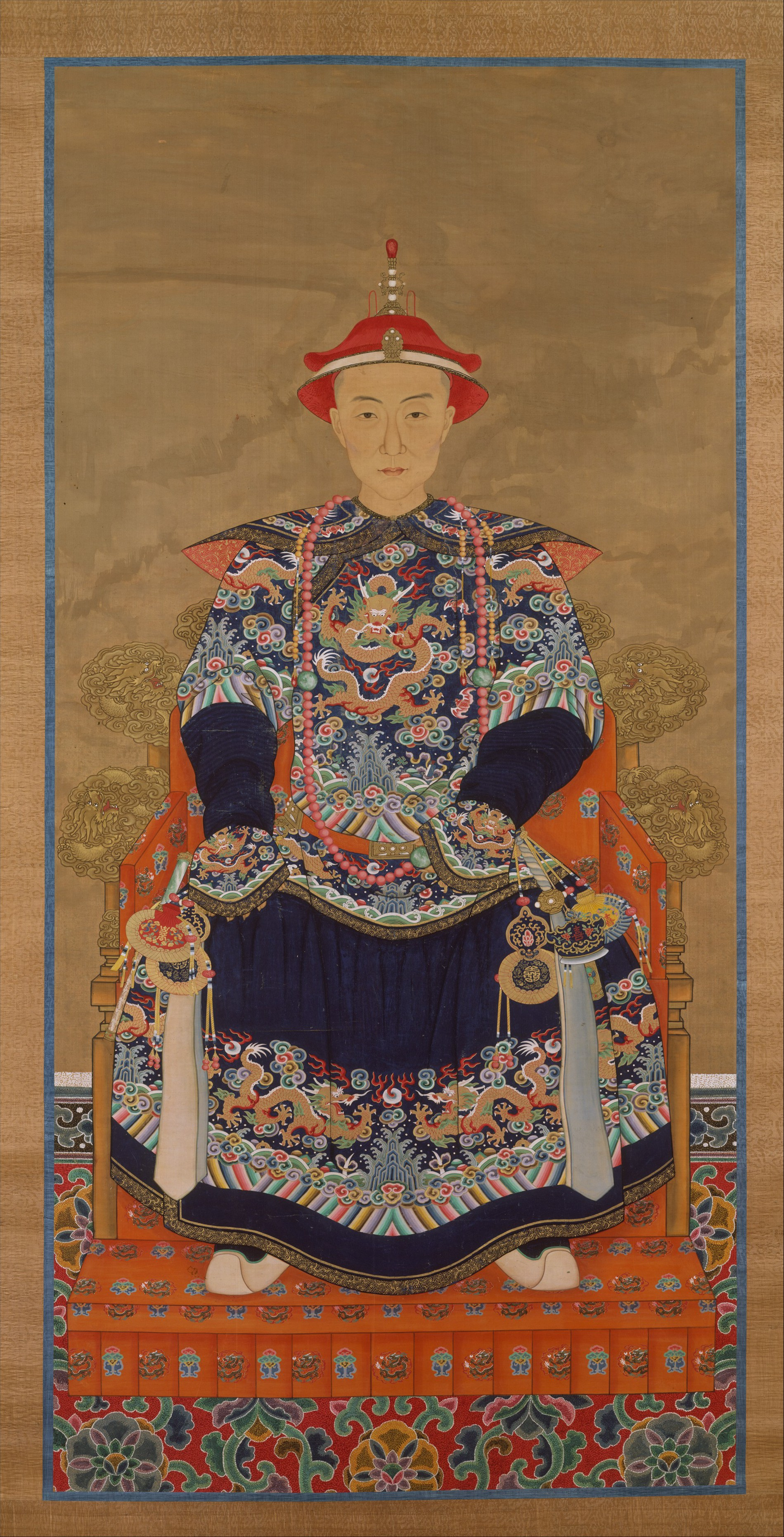
The young Qianlong Emperor as Prince Bao, Metropolitan Museum of Art

After his father's enthronement in 1722, Hongli was made a qinwang (first-rank prince) under the title "Prince Bao of the First Rank" (和碩寶親王; Héshuò Bǎo Qīnwáng). Like his many uncles, Hongli entered into a battle of succession with his elder half-brother Hongshi, who had the support of a large faction of officials in the imperial court as well as Yunsi, Prince Lian. For many years, the Yongzheng Emperor did not designate any of his sons as the crown prince, but many officials speculated that he favoured Hongli. Hongli went on inspection trips to the south and was an able negotiator and enforcer. He was also appointed as the chief regent on occasions when his father was away from the capital.

== Accession to the throne ==
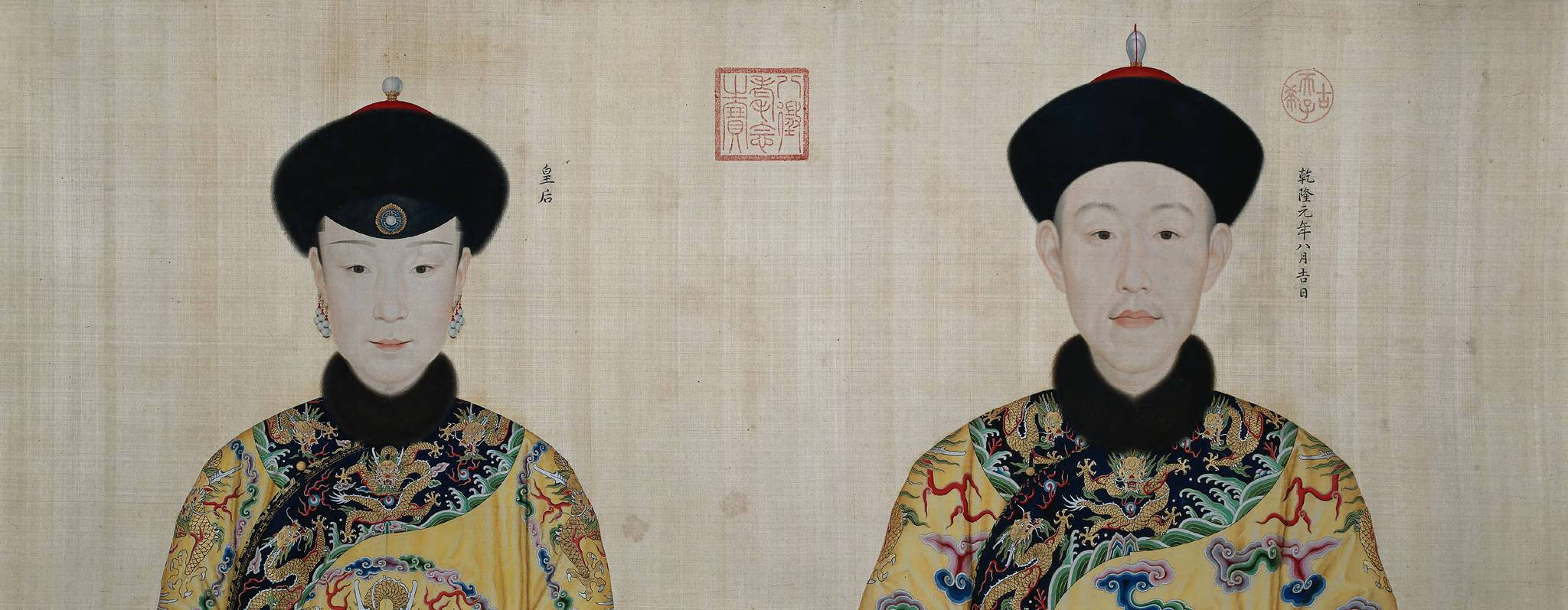
Inauguration portraits of Emperor Qianlong and Empress Xiaoxianchun, Cleveland Museum of Art.

Hongli's accession to the throne was already foreseen before he was officially proclaimed emperor before the assembled imperial court upon the death of the Yongzheng Emperor. The young Hongli was the favorite grandson of the Kangxi Emperor and the favorite son of the Yongzheng Emperor; the Yongzheng Emperor had entrusted a number of important ritual tasks to Hongli while the latter was still a prince, and included him in important court discussions of military strategy. In the hope of preventing a succession struggle from occurring, the Yongzheng Emperor wrote the name of his chosen successor on a piece of paper and placed it in a sealed box secured behind the tablet over the throne in the Palace of Heavenly Purity (Qianqing Palace). The name in the box was to be revealed to other members of the imperial family in the presence of all senior ministers only upon the death of the emperor. When the Yongzheng Emperor died suddenly in 1735, the will was taken out and read before the entire Qing imperial court, after which Hongli became the new emperor. Hongli adopted the era name "Qianlong", which means "Lasting Eminence".

Early in his reign, Hongli reversed his father's treatment of Zeng Jing, who had attempted to incite rebellion against Manchu rule. The Yongzheng Emperor had pardoned Zeng and publicised the case in the Dayi juemi lu (Awakening from Delusion). In 1736, Hongli ordered Zeng's execution, contrary to his father's instructions, and recalled copies of the publication.

In 1739, the Prince Hongxi (son of Kangxi's deposed crown prince, Yunreng) plotted a coup with five other princes to overthrow Qianlong and replace him with Hongxi. They planned to initiate their coup during an imperial hunt on the Mulan hunting grounds. Hongxi was proclaimed Emperor, but the plot was exposed by Prince Hongpu and the princes were arrested. The rebels were tried; the most prominent conspirators were imprisoned, while lessor offenders were stripped of their titles or demoted. In 1778, the Qianlong Emperor restored the original names to Yunsi, Yuntang, and Hongxi and allowed their descendants to be recorded in the imperial genealogy. However, the emperor did not revoke the decrees depriving those princes of their titles. In 1783, when the imperial chronicles were commissioned, the historians were ordered to emphasise the role of the emperor in quelling the rebellion and to mention that "Hongxi and others wanted to usurp the throne".

== Frontier wars ==
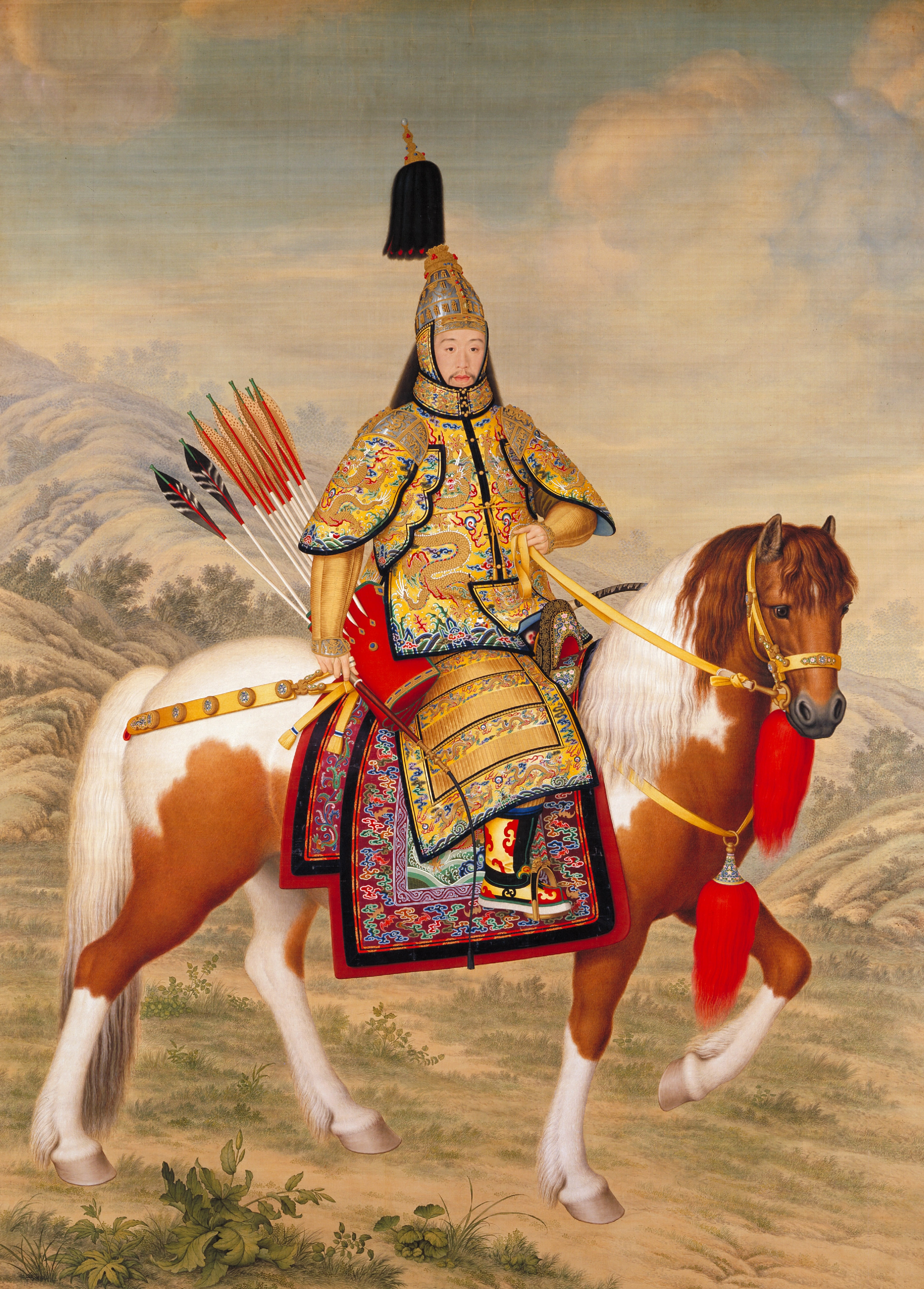
The Qianlong Emperor in Ceremonial Armour on Horseback, by Italian Jesuit Giuseppe Castiglione (known as Lang Shining in Chinese) (1688–1766)

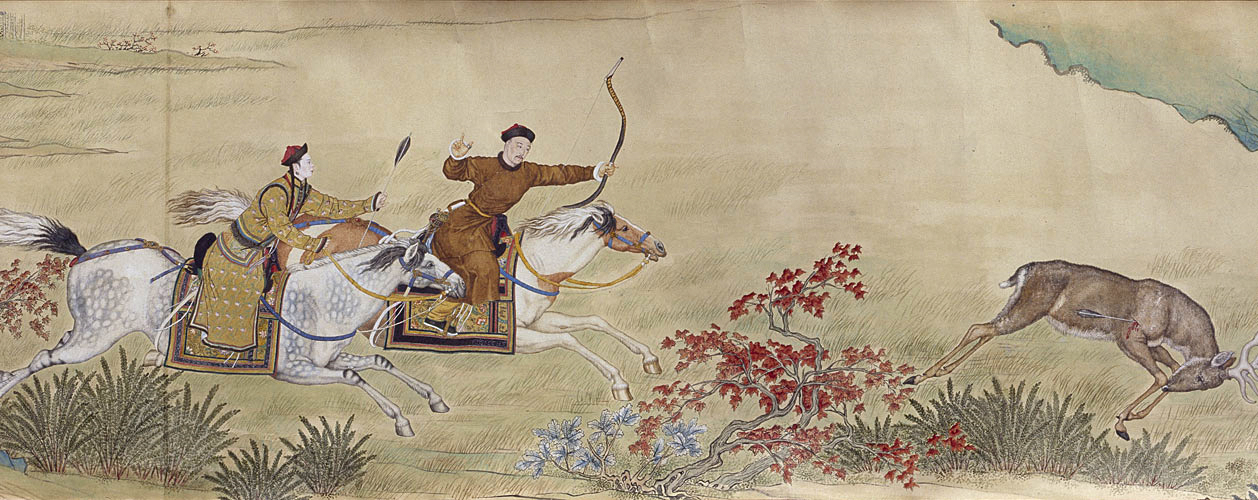
Qianlong Emperor hunting

The Qianlong Emperor's military record was mixed. Immediately after ascending the throne, he sent armies to suppress the Miao rebellion. He greatly expanded the territory controlled by the Qing Empire through the Ten Great Campaigns. The Qing empire expanded to twice the size of the prior Ming state, incorporating vast swathes of Inner Asia into its domain. Some scholars consider Qing expansionism to be colonial in nature.

Under the Qianlong Emperor's reign, the Dzungar Khanate based in Dzungharia was defeated by the Qing state as the climax of the Dzungar–Qing Wars. The Qing state would subsequently conquer the neighbouring Turkic oasis states of the Tarim basin as a byproduct of said conflict. The two regions of Dzungharia and the Tarim basin, which historically were separate geographies and cultures, would be conjoined and renamed as Xinjiang, while to the west, Ili was conquered and garrisoned.

The incorporation of Xinjiang into the Qing Empire resulted from the final defeat and destruction of the Dzungars (or Zunghars), a coalition of Western Mongol tribes. The Qianlong Emperor then ordered the Dzungar genocide. According to the Qing dynasty scholar Wei Yuan, 40% of the 600,000 Dzungars were killed by smallpox, 20% fled to the Russian Empire or Kazakh tribes, and 30% were killed by the Qing army, in what Michael Edmund Clarke described as "the complete destruction of not only the Zunghar state but of the Zunghars as a people". Historian Peter Perdue has argued that the decimation of the Dzungars was the result of an explicit policy of genocide launched by the Qianlong Emperor.

The Dzungar genocide has been compared to the Qing extermination of the Jinchuan Tibetan people in 1776, which also occurred during the Qianlong Emperor's reign. When victorious troops returned to Beijing, a celebratory hymn was sung in their honour. A Manchu version of the hymn was recorded by the Jesuit Amiot and sent to Paris.

The Qing Empire hired Zhao Yi and Jiang Yongzhi at the Military Archives Office, in their capacity as members of the Hanlin Academy, to compile works on the Dzungar campaign, such as Strategy for the pacification of the Dzungars (Pingding Zhunge'er fanglue). Poems glorifying the Qing conquest and genocide of the Dzungar Mongols were written by Zhao, who wrote the Yanpu zaji in "brush-notes" style, where military expenditures of the Qianlong Emperor's reign were recorded. The Qianlong Emperor was praised as being the source of "eighteenth-century peace and prosperity" by Zhao Yi.

Khalkha Mongol rebels under Prince Chingünjav had plotted with the Dzungar leader Amursana and led a rebellion against the Qing Empire around the same time as the Dzungars. The Qing army crushed the rebellion and executed Chingünjav and his entire family.

Throughout this period there were continued Mongol interventions in Tibet and a reciprocal spread of Tibetan Buddhism in Mongolia. After the Lhasa riot of 1750, the Qianlong Emperor sent armies into Tibet and firmly established the Dalai Lama as the ruler of Tibet, with a Qing resident and garrison to preserve Qing presence. Further afield, military campaigns against Nepalese and Gurkhas forced the emperor into stalemate where both parties had to submit.

On 23 January 1751, Tibetan rebels who participated in the Lhasa riot of 1750 against the Qing were sliced to death by Qing Manchu general Bandi, similar to what happened to Tibetan rebels on 1 November 1728 during his father, the Yongzheng Emperor's reign. Six Tibetan rebel leaders plus Tibetan rebel leader Blo-bzan-bkra-sis were sliced to death. The rest of the Tibetan rebel leaders were strangled and beheaded and their heads were displayed to the Tibetan public on poles. The Qing seized the property of the rebels and exiled other Tibetan rebels. Manchu General Bandi sent a report to the Qing Qianlong emperor on 26 January 1751 on how he carried out the slicings and executions of the Tibetan rebels. The Tibetan rebels dBan-rgyas (Wang-chieh), Padma-sku-rje-c'os-a['el (Pa-t'e-ma-ku-erh-chi-ch'un-p'i-lo) and Tarqan Yasor (Ta-erh-han Ya-hsün) were sliced to death for injuring the Manchu ambans with arrows, bows and fowling pieces during the Lhasa riot when they assaulted the building the Manchu ambans (Labdon and Fucin) were in. Tibetan rebel Sacan Hasiha (Ch'e-ch'en-ha-shih-ha) was sliced to death for murder of multiple individuals. Tibetan rebels Ch'ui-mu-cha-t'e and Rab-brtan (A-la-pu-tan) were sliced to death for looting money and setting fire during the attack on the Ambans. Tibetan rebel Blo-bzan-bkra-sis, the mgron-gner was sliced to death for being the overall leader of the rebels who led the attack which looted money and killed the Manchu ambans. Two Tibetan rebels who had already died before the execution had their dead bodies beheaded, one died in jail, Lag-mgon-po (La-k'o-kun-pu) and the other killed himself since he was scared of the punishment, Pei-lung-sha-k'o-pa. Bandi sentenced to strangulation several rebel followers and bKra-sis-rab-brtan (Cha-shih-la-pu-tan) a messenger. He ordered the live beheadings of Man-chin Te-shih-nai and rDson-dpon dBan-rgyal (Ts'eng-pen Wang-cha-lo and P'yag-mdsod-pa Lha-skyabs (Shang-cho-t'e-pa La-cha-pu) for leading the attack on the building by being the first to go to on the staircase to the next floor and setting fire and carrying the straw to fuel the fire besides killing several men on orders from the rebel leader.

In 1762 the Qianlong Emperor came close to war with the Afghan Emir Ahmad Shah Durrani because of Qing China's expansions in Central Asia. While Qing and Durrani Empire troops were sent near the frontier in Central Asia, war did not break out. A year later, Durrani sent an envoy to Beijing gifting four splendid horses to Qianlong, which became the subject of a series of paintings, Four Afghan Steeds. However, the Afghan envoy failed to make a good impression to Qianlong after refusing to perform the kowtow. Qianlong later refused to intervene in the Durrani Empire's killing of the Sultan of Badakhshan, who was a vassal of Qing China.

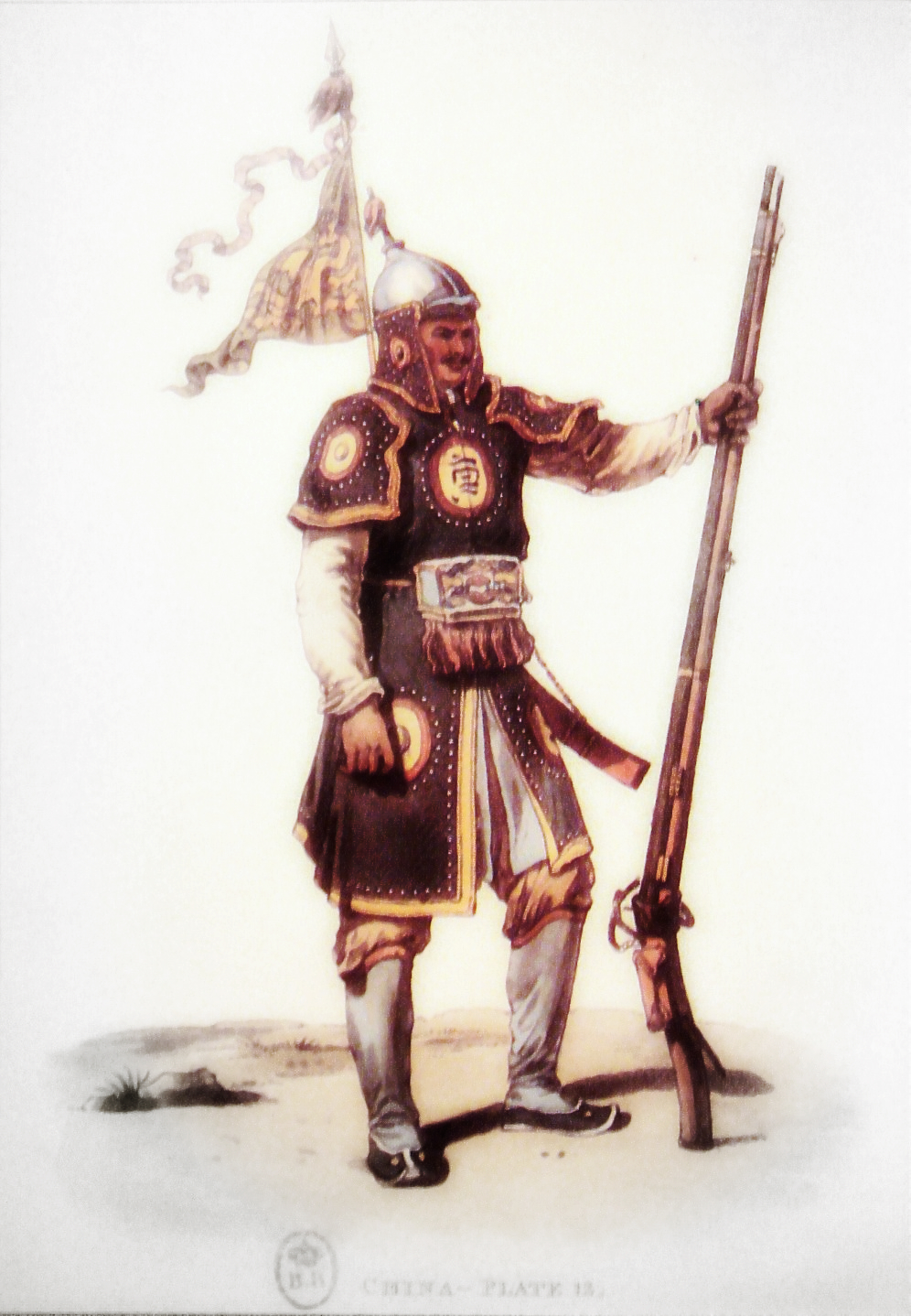
A soldier from the Qianlong era, by William Alexander, 1793

The Qianlong Emperor responded to the vassal Shan States's request for military aid against the attacking forces of Burma, but the Sino-Burmese War ended in complete failure. He initially believed that it would be an easy victory against a barbarian tribe, and sent only the Green Standard Army based in Yunnan, which borders Burma. The Qing invasion came as the majority of Burmese forces were deployed in their latest invasion of the Siamese Ayutthaya Kingdom. Nonetheless, battle-hardened Burmese troops defeated the first two invasions of 1765–66 and 1766–67 at the border. The regional conflict now escalated to a major war that involved military manoeuvres nationwide in both countries. The third invasion (1767–1768) led by the elite Manchu Bannermen nearly succeeded, penetrating deep into central Burma within a few days' march from the capital, Inwa. However, the Manchu Bannermen of northern China could not cope with "unfamiliar tropical terrains and lethal endemic diseases", and were driven back with heavy losses. After the close call, King Hsinbyushin redeployed his armies from Siam to the Chinese front. The fourth and largest invasion got bogged down at the frontier. With the Qing forces completely encircled, a truce was reached between the field commanders of the two sides in December 1769. The Qing forces kept a heavy military lineup in the border areas of Yunnan for about one decade in an attempt to wage another war while imposing a ban on inter-border trade for two decades. When Burma and China resumed a diplomatic relationship in 1790, the Qing government unilaterally viewed the act as Burmese submission, and claimed victory. The Qianlong Emperor ordered Manchu general Eledeng'e (also spelled E'erdeng'e (額爾登額, or possibly 額爾景額)) to be sliced to death after his commander Mingrui was defeated at the Battle of Maymyo in the Sino-Burmese war in 1768 because Eledeng'i was not able to help flank Mingrui when he did not arrive at a rendezvous.

The circumstances in Vietnam were not successful either. In 1787, Lê Chiêu Thống, the last ruler of the Vietnamese Lê dynasty, fled from Vietnam and formally requested to be restored to his throne in Thăng Long (present-day Hanoi). The Qianlong Emperor agreed and sent a large army into Vietnam to remove the Tây Sơn (rebels who had captured all of Vietnam). The capital, Thăng Long, was conquered in 1788, but a few months later the Qing army was defeated, and the invasion turned into a debacle due to the surprise attack during Tết (Vietnamese New Year) by Nguyễn Huệ, the second and most capable of the three Tây Sơn brothers. The Qing Empire no longer supported Lê Chiêu Thống, and his family were imprisoned in Vietnam. The Qing would not intervene in Vietnam for another 90 years.

Despite setbacks in the south, overall the Qianlong Emperor's military expansion nearly doubled the area of the already vast Qing Empire, and unified many non-Han peoples—such as Uyghurs, Kazakhs, Kyrgyzs, Evenks and Mongols. It was also a very expensive enterprise; the funds in the Imperial Treasury were almost all put into military expeditions. Though the wars were successful, they were not overwhelmingly so. The Qing army declined noticeably and had a difficult time facing some enemies: the campaign against the Jinchuan hill peoples took 2 to 3 years—at first the Qing army were mauled, though Yue Zhongqi (a descendant of Yue Fei) later took control of the situation. The battle with the Dzungars was closely fought, and caused heavy losses on both sides.

The Ush rebellion in 1765 by Uyghur Muslims against the Manchus occurred after Uyghur women were gang raped by the servants and son of Manchu official Sucheng. It was said that "Ush Muslims had long wanted to sleep on [Sucheng and son's] hides and eat their flesh" because of the rape of Uyghur Muslim women for months by the Manchu official Sucheng and his son. The Manchu Qianlong Emperor ordered that the Uyghur rebel town be massacred, the Qing forces enslaved all the Uyghur children and women and slaughtered the Uyghur men. Manchu soldiers and Manchu officials regularly having sex with or raping Uyghur women caused massive hatred and anger against Manchu rule among Uyghur Muslims. The invasion by Jahangir Khoja was preceded by another Manchu official, Binjing, who raped a Muslim daughter of the Kokan aqsaqal from 1818 to 1820. The Qing sought to cover up the rape of Uyghur women by Manchus to prevent anger against their rule from spreading among the Uyghurs.

At the end of the frontier wars, the Qing army had started to weaken significantly. In addition to a more lenient military system, warlords became satisfied with their lifestyles. Since most of the warring had already taken place, warlords no longer saw any reason to train their armies, resulting in a rapid military decline by the end of the Qianlong Emperor's reign. This was the main reason for the Qing military's failure to suppress the White Lotus Rebellion, which started towards the end of the Qianlong Emperor's reign and extended into the reign of the Jiaqing Emperor.

== Cultural achievements ==
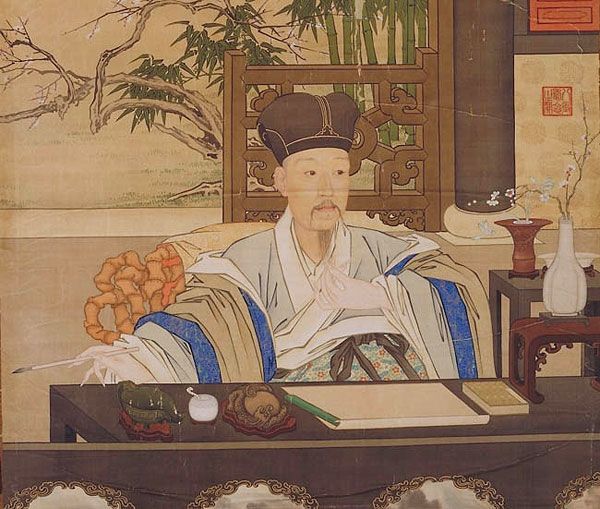
The Qianlong Emperor in his study, painting by Giuseppe Castiglione, 18th century

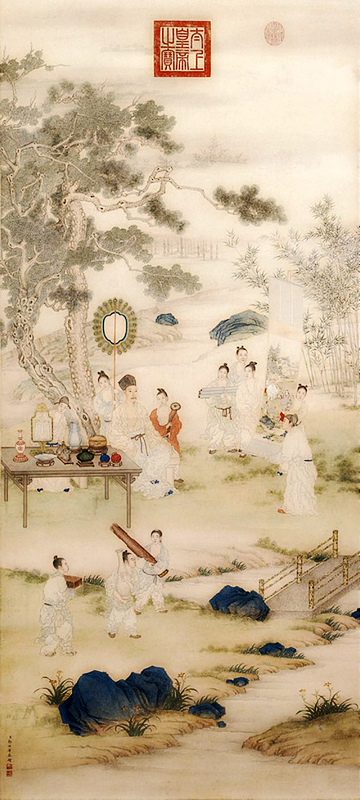
The Qianlong Emperor Viewing Paintings

The Qianlong Emperor, like his predecessors, took his cultural role seriously. First, he worked to preserve the Manchu heritage, which he saw as the basis of the moral character of the Manchus and thus of the dynasty's power. He ordered the compilation of Manchu language genealogies, histories, and ritual handbooks and in 1747 secretly ordered the compilation of the Shamanic Code, published later in the Complete Library of the Four Treasuries. He further solidified the dynasty's cultural and religious claims in Central Asia by ordering a replica of the Tibetan Potala Palace, the Putuo Zongcheng Temple, to be built on the grounds of the imperial summer palace in Chengde. In order to present himself in Buddhist terms for appeasing the Mongols and Tibetan subjects, he commissioned a thangka, or sacred painting, depicting him as Manjushri, the Bodhisattva of Wisdom. He was also a poet and essayist. His collected writings, which he published in a tenfold series between 1749 and 1800, contain more than 40,000 poems and 1,300 prose texts, which if he had composed them all would make him one of the most prolific writers of all time.

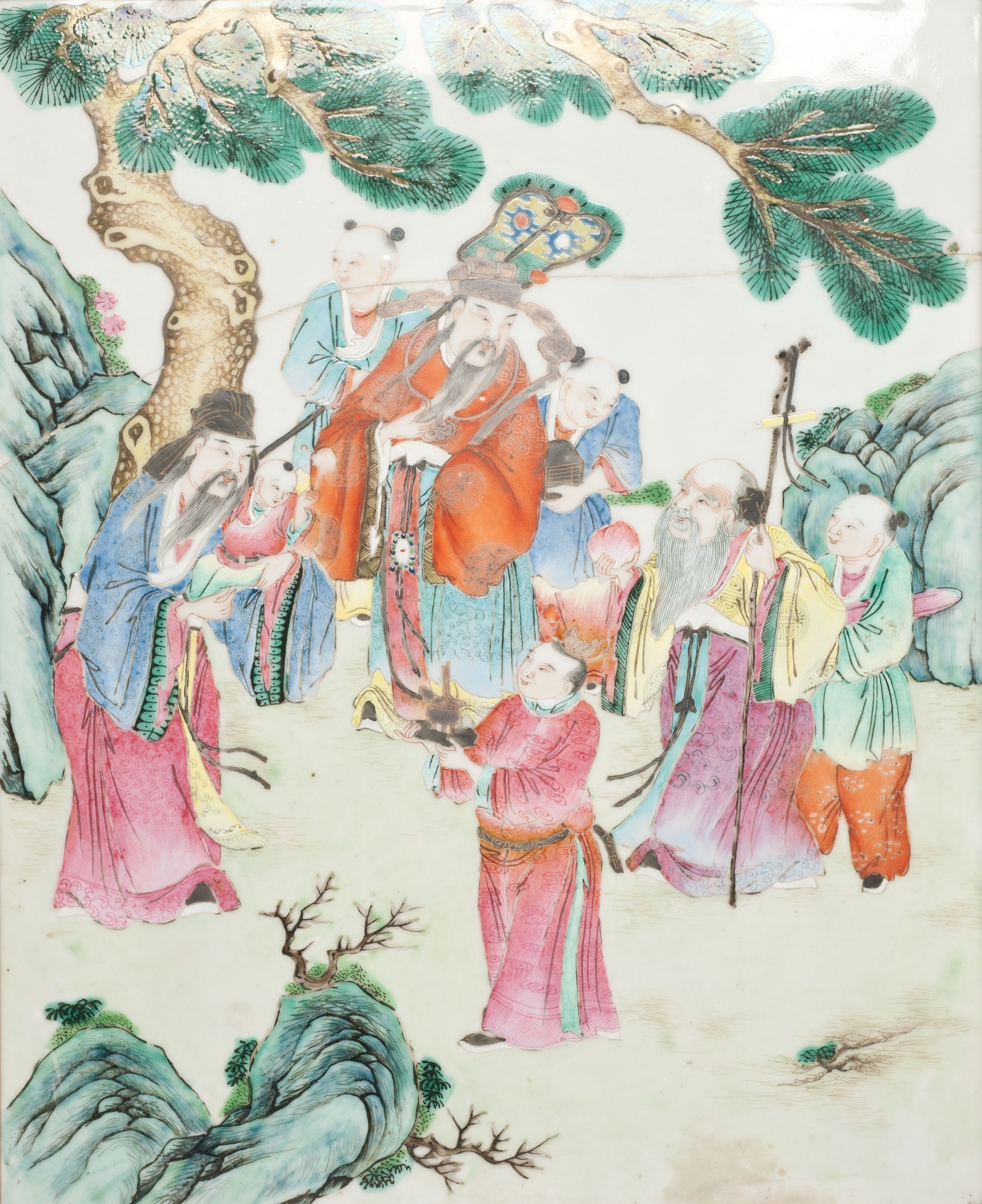
Rectangular piece of porcelain, painted with an image of Sanxing: Fu, Lu and Shou, from China: Qianlong period, Spoelberch collection, KU Leuven

The Qianlong Emperor was a major patron and important "preserver and restorer" of Confucian culture. He had an insatiable appetite for collecting, and acquired much of China's "great private collections" by any means necessary, and "reintegrated their treasures into the imperial collection." He formed a team of cultural advisers to help locate collections of merchant families who needed to sell or whose heirs had lost interest. He sometimes pressured or forced wealthy officials to surrender precious objects by offering to excuse shortcomings in their performance if they made a certain "gift". On several occasions he claimed that a painting could be secure from theft or fire only if it was taken into the Forbidden City.

The Emperor's massive art collection became an intimate part of his life; he took landscape paintings with him on his travels to compare them with the actual landscapes, or to hang them in special rooms in palaces where he lodged, in order to inscribe them on every visit there. "He also regularly added poetic inscriptions to the paintings of the imperial collection, following the example of the emperors of the Song dynasty and the literati painters of the Ming dynasty. They were a mark of distinction for the work, and a visible sign of his rightful role as emperor. Most particular to the Qianlong Emperor is another type of inscription, revealing a unique practice of dealing with works of art that he seems to have developed for himself. On certain fixed occasions over a long period he contemplated a number of paintings or works of calligraphy which possessed special meaning for him, inscribing each regularly with mostly private notes on the circumstances of enjoying them, using them almost as a diary." In particular, the Qianlong Emperor housed within the Hall of Three Rarities (Sanxitang), a small chamber within the Hall of Mental Cultivation, three calligraphy works: "Timely Clearing After Snowfall" by Wang Xizhi, from the Jin dynasty, "Mid-Autumn" by his son Wang Xianzhi, and "Letter to Boyuan" by Wang Xun.

Most of the several thousand jade items in the imperial collection date from his reign. The Emperor was also particularly interested in collecting ancient bronzes, bronze mirrors and seals," in addition to pottery, [ceramics and applied arts such as enameling, metal work and lacquer work, which flourished during his reign; a substantial part of his collection is in the Percival David Foundation in London. The Victoria and Albert Museum and British Museum also have collections of art from the Qianlong era.

One of his grandest projects was to assemble a team of scholars to assemble, edit, and print the largest collection ever made of Chinese philosophy, history, and literature. Known as the Complete Library of the Four Treasuries (or Siku Quanshu), it was published in 36,000 volumes, containing about 3,450 complete works and employing as many as 15,000 copyists. It preserved numerous books, but was also intended as a way to ferret out and suppress political opponents, requiring the "careful examination of private libraries to assemble a list of around eleven thousand works from the past, of which about a third were chosen for publication. The works not included were either summarised or—in a good many cases—scheduled for destruction."

=== Burning of books and modification of texts ===
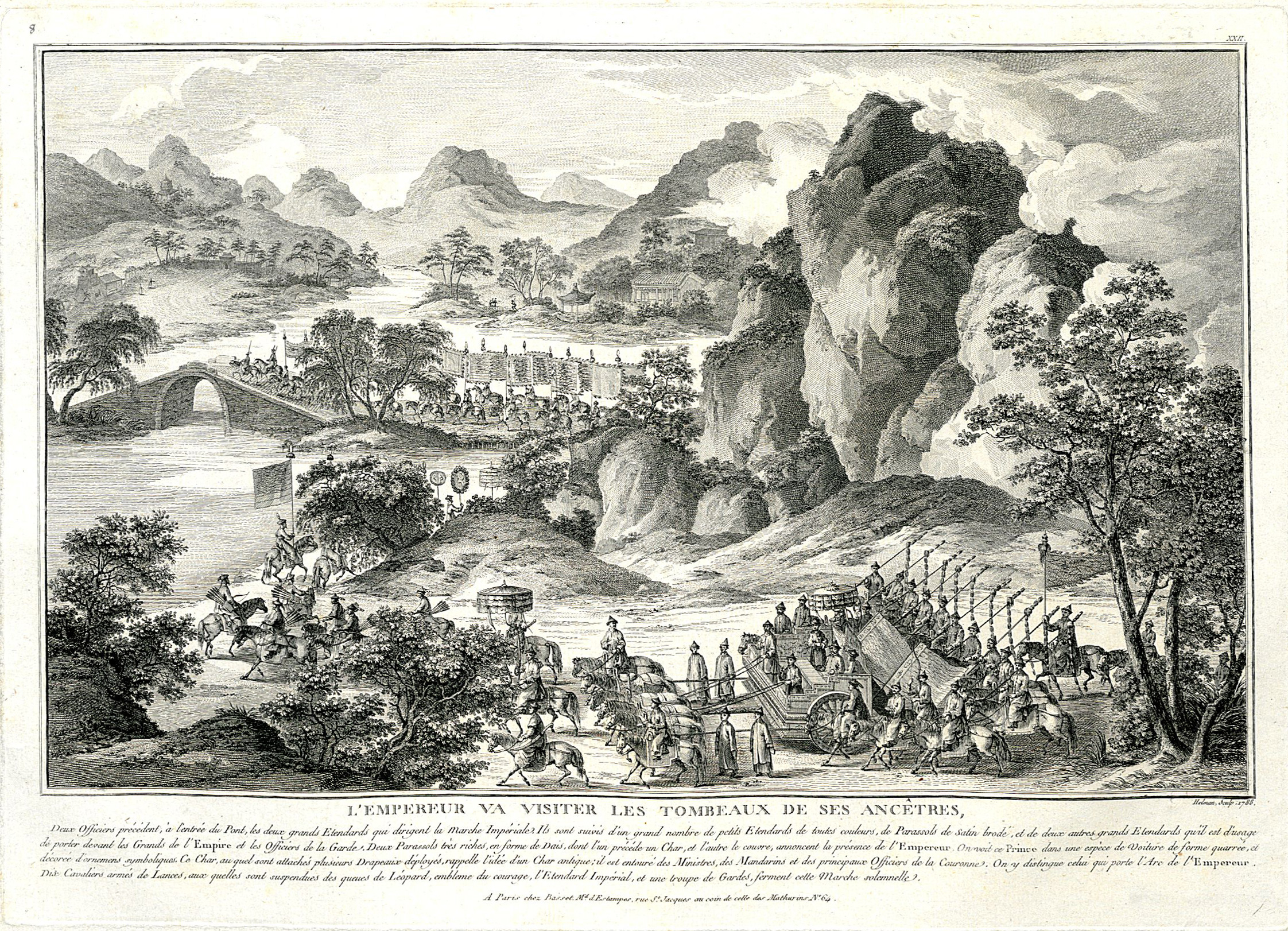
A visit by the Emperor to the tombs of his ancestors

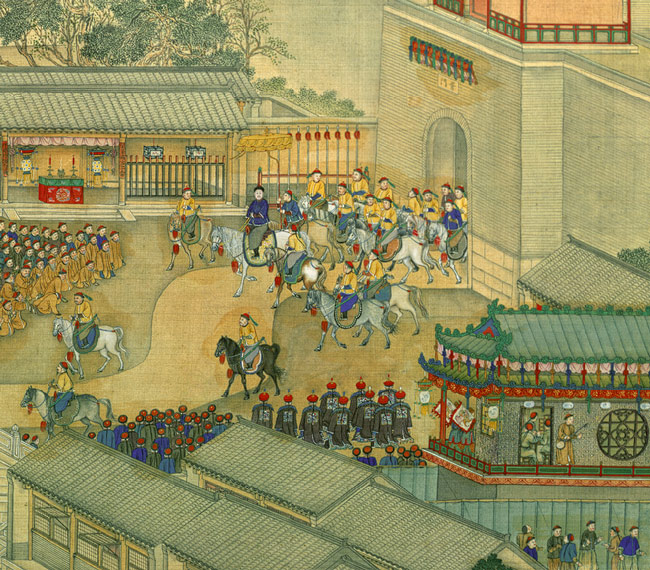
Qianlong Emperor entering Suzhou and the Grand Canal

Some 2,300 works were listed for total suppression and another 350 for partial suppression. The aim was to destroy the writings that were anti-Qing or rebellious, that insulted previous "barbarian" dynasties, or that dealt with frontier or defence problems. The full editing of the Complete Library of the Four Treasuries was completed in about ten years; during these ten years, 3,100 titles (or works), about 150,000 copies of books were either burnt or banned. Of those volumes that had been categorised into the Complete Library of the Four Treasuries, many were subjected to deletion and modification. Books published during the Ming dynasty suffered the greatest damage.

The authority would judge any single character or any single sentence's neutrality; if the authority had decided these words, or sentence, were derogatory or cynical towards the rulers, then persecution would begin. In the Qianlong Emperor's time, there were 53 cases of Literary Inquisition, resulting in the victims executed by beheading or slow slicing (lingchi), or having their corpses mutilated (if they were already dead).

=== Literary works ===
In 1743, after his first visit to Mukden (present-day Shenyang, Liaoning), the Qianlong Emperor used Chinese to write his "Ode to Mukden" (Shengjing fu/Mukden-i fujurun bithe), a fu in classical style, as a poem of praise to Mukden, at that point a general term for what was later called Manchuria, describing its beauties and historical values. He describes the mountains and wildlife, using them to justify his belief that the dynasty would endure. A Manchu translation was then made. In 1748, he ordered a jubilee printing in both Chinese and Manchu, using some genuine pre-Qin forms and Manchu styles which had to be invented and which could not be read.

=== Languages ===
In his childhood, the Qianlong Emperor was tutored in Manchu, Chinese and Mongolian, arranged to be tutored in Tibetan, and spoke Chagatai (Turki or Modern Uyghur). However, he was even more concerned than his predecessors to preserve and promote the Manchu language among his followers, as he proclaimed that "the keystone for Manchus is language." He commissioned new Manchu dictionaries, and directed the preparation of the Pentaglot Dictionary which gave equivalents for Manchu terms in Mongolian, Tibetan and Turkic, and had the Buddhist canon translated into Manchu, which was considered the "national language". He directed the elimination of loanwords taken from Chinese and replaced them with calque translations which were put into new Manchu dictionaries. Manchu translations of Chinese works during his reign contrasted with supposedly Manchu books of the Kangxi Emperor's reign, which were simply Chinese texts written in Manchu script.

The Qianlong Emperor commissioned the Qin ding Xiyu Tongwen Zhi (欽定西域同文志; "Imperial Western Regions Thesaurus") which was a thesaurus of geographic names in Xinjiang, in Oirat Mongol, Manchu, Chinese, Tibetan, and Turki (Modern Uyghur).

=== Tibetan Buddhism ===
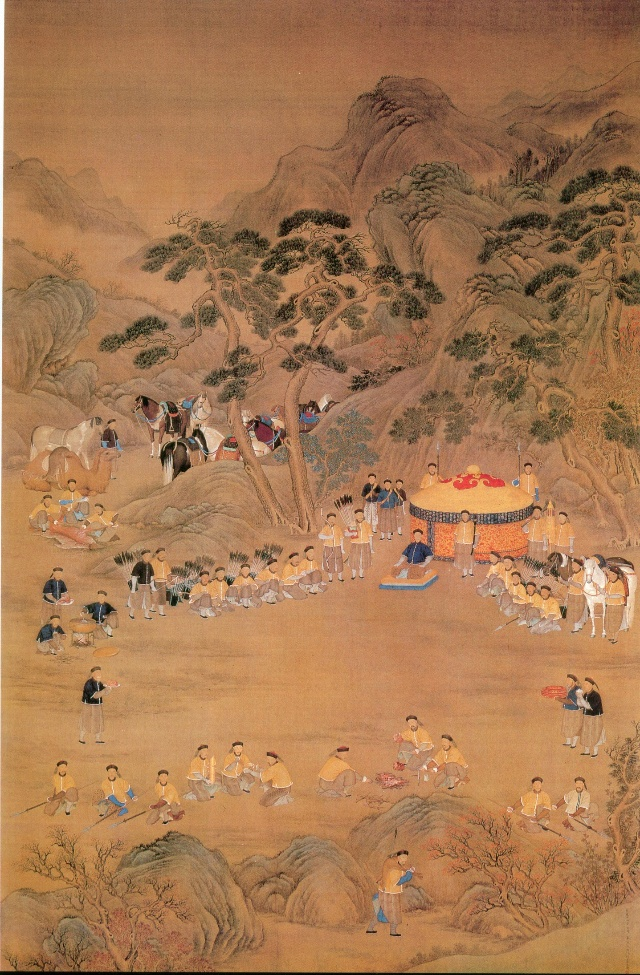
Qianlong Emperor on a hunting trip

The Qianlong Emperor showed a personal belief in Tibetan Buddhism, following the tradition of Manchu rulers associating with the Bodhisattva Manjushri. He continued their patronage of Tibetan Buddhist art and ordered translations of the Buddhist canon into Manchu. Court records and Tibetan language sources affirm his personal commitment. He learned to read Tibetan and studied Buddhist texts assiduously. His beliefs are reflected in the Tibetan Buddhist imagery of his tomb, perhaps the most personal and private expression of an emperor's life. He supported the Yellow Church (the Tibetan Buddhist Gelug sect) to "maintain peace among the Mongols" since the Mongols were followers of the Dalai Lama and Panchen Lama of the Yellow Church. He also said it was "merely in pursuance of Our policy of extending Our affection to the weak" which led him to patronize the Yellow Church.

In 1744 he turned the Palace of Harmony (Yonghe Palace) into a Tibetan Buddhist temple for Mongols. To explain the practical reasons for supporting the "Yellow Hats" Tibetan Buddhists and to deflect Han Chinese criticism, he had the "Lama Shuo" stele engraved in Tibetan, Mongol, Manchu and Chinese, which said: "By patronizing the Yellow Church, we maintain peace among the Mongols. This being an important task we cannot but protect this (religion). (In doing so) we do not show any bias, nor do we wish to adulate the Tibetan priests (as it was done during the Yuan dynasty)."

Mark Elliott concludes that these actions delivered political benefits but "meshed seamlessly with his personal faith."

=== Anti-Islam laws ===
Qing policy on Muslims and Islam was changed during the reign of the Kangxi, Yongzheng and Qianlong Emperors. While the Kangxi Emperor proclaimed Muslims and Han to be equal, his grandson, the Qianlong Emperor was a bigot, endorsed Han officials harsh recommendations towards treatment of Muslims. The Kangxi Emperor said that Muslim and Han Chinese were equal when people argued for Muslims to be treated differently. Yongzheng then fired an official for demanding Muslims be punished more harshly than non-Muslims.

This policy changed in the reign of the Qianlong Emperor. Chen Hongmou, a Qing official, said that Muslims needed to be brought to law and order by being punished more harshly and blaming Muslim leaders for criminal behavior of Muslims in a letter to the Board of Punishments called Covenant to Instruct and Admonish Muslims that he wrote in 1751. Although the Board of Punishment did nothing, the Shaanxi-Gansu Governor-General in 1762 then proceeded to implement his recommendation and had Muslim criminals punished severely more than Han Chinese ones. He also implemented the policy that the criminal deeds of Muslim congregants of Mosques ended up with their Imams being punished and held responsible for them. These anti-Muslim policies by the governor general received endorsement from the Qianlong Emperor.

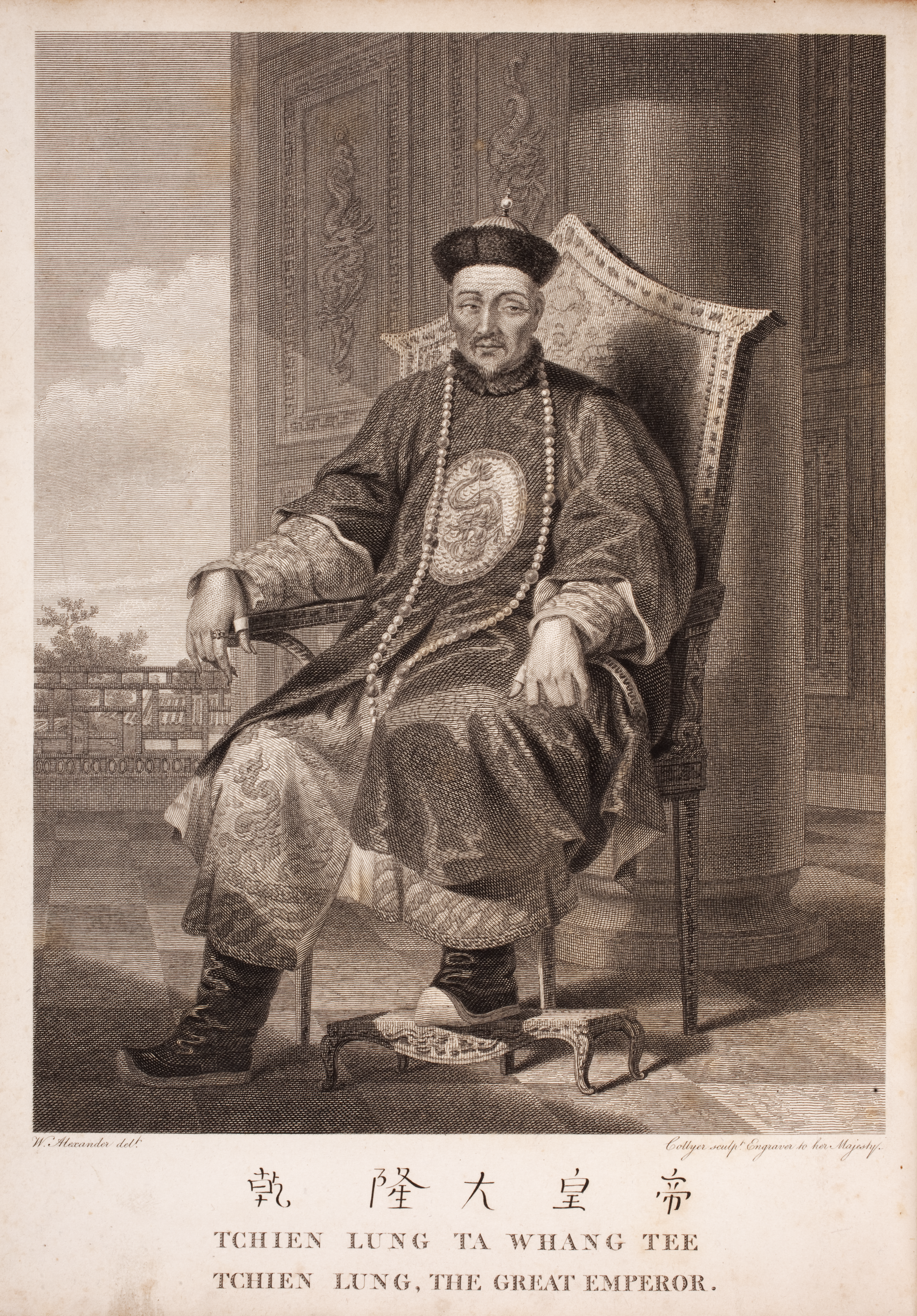
Engraving of the Qianlong Emperor

Great changes happening to Chinese Muslims, like the introduction of a Sufi order, the Naqshbandiyya to the Hui, causing the Qianlong emperor to adopt this harsh attitude against Muslims in contrast to his grandfather and father. This led to larger connections between the Hui and the broader Islamic world from the west, as the Naqshbandiyya order came east to the Hui when Hui scholars in Suzhou were converted to Naqshbandiyya by Muhammad Yusuf Khoja. Afaq Khoja, Muhammad Yusuf's son, also further spread Naqshbandi orders among Chinese Muslims like Tibetan Muslims, Salars, Hui and other Muslim ethnicities in Hezhou, Gansu (now Linxia) and Xining in Qinghai and Lanzhou. Ma Laichi was the leader of one of these orders and he personally studied in the Islamic world in Bukhara to learn Sufism, and Yemen and in Mecca where he was taught by Mawlana Makhdum. This brought him prestige among Chinese Muslims. In an argument over the breaking of fast during Ramadan Ma Laichi said that before praying in the mosque, fast should be broken, not vice versa and this led to him getting many Naqshbandi converts from Hui and Turkic Salars. It came to court in 1731 when the Muslims arguing over how to break Ramadan fast filed lawsuits. The Muslim plaintiffs were told by the Qing authorities at the court to resolve them themselves, as the legal authorities who had no idea about Ramadan fasting. The dispute was not solved and continued to go on and was compounded by even more disputes like how to perform dhikr in Sufism, in a jahri (vocal) as taught by Ma Mingxin, another Sufi who learned in the western Islamic lands like Bukhara, or khufi (silent) like what Ma Laichi did. The Zabid Naqshbandiyyas in Yemen taught Ma Mingxin for two decades. They taught vocal dhikr. Ma Mingxin was also affected by another series of events in the Middle Eastern Muslim world, revivalist movements among Muslims like the Saudis who allied with Muhammad ibn 'Abd al-Wahhab. This renewal tajdid influenced Ma Mingxin in Yemen.

While Ma Mingxin was in Yemen and away from China, all of Muslim Inner Asia was conquered by the "infidel" Qing dynasty giving even more relevance to his situation and views. Ma Laichi and Ma Mingxin again sued each other in court but this second time the Qing passed a verdict in favor of the quiet dhikr faction, the Silentist Khafiyya of Ma Laichi and gave it the status of orthodoxy while damning as heterodox the Aloudist Jahriyya of Ma Mingxin. Ma Mingxin ignored the order and kept proselytizing in Shaanxi, Ningxia and Xinjiang going to Guangchuan from Hezhou in 1769 after being kicked out and banned from Xunhua district. Turkic Salars in Xunhua followed his orders even after the Qing banned him from there and he continued to have further lawsuits and legal issues with the Khafiyya and Ma Laichi as the Qing backed the Khafiyya.

A violent battle where a Qing official and Khafiyya followers were among one hundred slaughtered by a Jahriyya assault headed by Su Forty-three, a supporter of Ma Mingxin in 1781 led to Ma Mingxin declared a rebel and taken to jail in Lanzhou. The Qing executed Ma Mingxin after his release was demanded by the armed followers of Su Forty-three. A Jahriyya rebellion all over northwest China ensued after Ma Mingxin was executed. In response, the Manchus in Beijing sent Manchu Grand Secretary Agui with a battalion to slaughter Jahriyya chiefs and exile the adherents of the Sufi order to the border regions.

Tian Wu led another Jahriyya rebellion 3 years after that, which was crushed by the Qing, and the Ma Datian, the Jahriyya's 3rd leader was exiled to Manchuria in 1818 by the Qing and died.

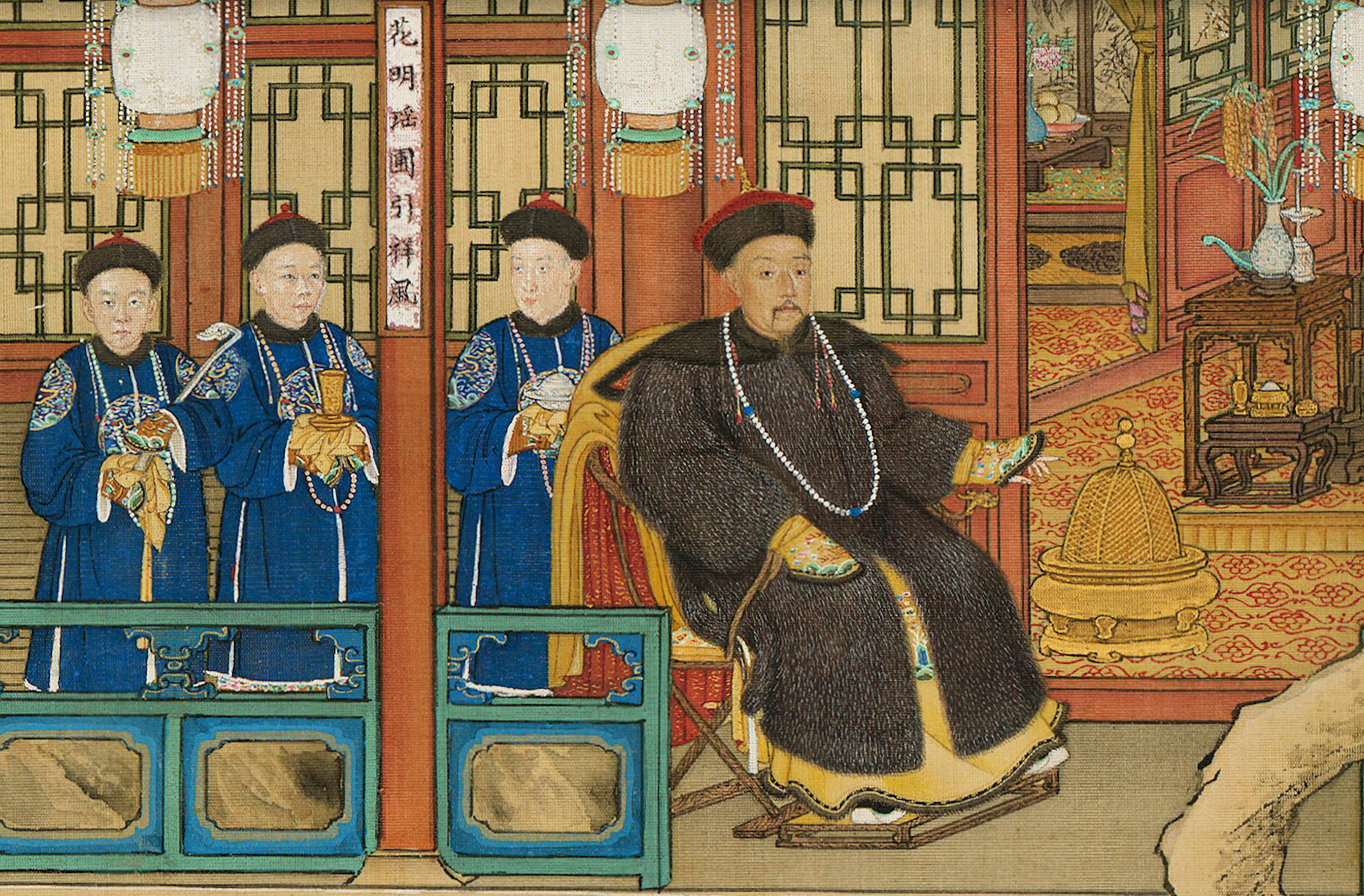
Emperor Qianlong, aged 50, in the Forbidden City, Beijing in 1761 (winter). In Ten Thousand Nations Coming to Pay Tribute (萬國來朝圖)

This continual build up of conflict between Muslims and the Qing court led to the 19th century full-scale wars with Muslim rebellions against the Qing in southern and northern China. The change in Manchu attitudes towards Muslims, from tolerating Muslims and regarding them as equal to Han Chinese, before the 1760s, to the violence between the Qing state and Muslims after the 1760s, was due to progressive Qing involvement in the conflict between the Sufi orders Jahriyya and Khafiyya making it no longer possible for the Qing to keep up with the early rhetoric of Muslim equality. The Manchu court under Qianlong began approving and implementing Chen Hongmou's anti-Muslim laws that targeted Muslims for practicing their religion and the violence by the Qing state, the communal violence between Jahriyya and Khafiyya coincided with the Jahriyya's major expansion.

Chen Hongmou's policies were implemented as laws in 1762 by the Qing government's Board of Punishments and the Qing Manchu Qianlong emperor leading to severe tensions with Muslims. State authorities were mandated to receive all reports of Muslim criminal behaviour by local officials and all criminal behaviour by Muslims had to be reported by Muslim leaders to Qing authorities under these laws. This led to an inundation of anti-Muslim reports filing in Qing offices as the Qing court received information that Muslims were inherently violent and Muslim bandits were committing crimes as report after report were filed by local officials and Muslim crimes inundated court records. The Qing became even more anti-Muslim after receiving these reports about criminal behavior and started passing even more anti-Muslim laws one of them being that if any weapon was found in a group of 3 or more Muslims all of those Muslims would by sentenced as criminals by the Qing.

A new criminal category or act, brawling (dou'ou) was designated by the Qing Manchu court of the Manchu Qianlong emperor in the 1770s especially as an anti-Muslim measure to arrest Muslims leading to even non-Jahriyya Muslims to join with Jahriyya against the Qing and leading the Qing court to be even more anti-Muslim, apprehensive of anti-Qing rebellion by Muslims. This led to the execution of Ma Mingxin in 1781 and the rebellion and violence was compounded by lack of Qing intelligence. A Qing official who was tasked with ending the Jahriyya and Khafiyya communal violence mistakenly thought the people he were talking to were Khafiyya when they were in fact Jahriyya, and he told them that the Qing would massacre all Jahriyya adherents. This led to him being murdered by the Jahriyya mob, which led to the Qing sending Manchu Grand Secretary Agui on a full scale pacification crackdown campaign against the Jahriyya.

The military victory of the Qing against the Jahriyya led to even more Jahriyya anger. Officials went overboard in massacring Muslims deemed as state enemies to impress the Qing court, leading to further growth in Jahriyya membership, leading in turn to the 1784 rebellion by Tian Wu.

The Qianlong Emperor asked his minister what was going on as he was puzzled as to how the Muslims from many regions gathered together for revolt. He asked if the investigation of Muslim behavior by Li Shiyao got leaked leading to rebels to incite violence by telling Muslims the government would exterminate them. He then pondered and said none of these could be why and kept asking why. To solve the issue of the 1784 revolt, northwestern China was put under military occupation by the Qing for 50 years until the Taiping rebellion of southern China forced the Qing to move them away from northwest China leading to the massive 1860s and 1870s Muslim revolts in the northwest caused by growing violence.

The sudden questions about halal in Islam that Mongol Buddhists had in the 18th century was caused by all these things, northwestern China right next to Mongolia getting militarized, the Qing government officially declaring Muslims to be anti-Qing and violent and revivalist Islam coming to China.

More than 1000 Hui Muslim children and women from the Sufi Jahriya order in eastern Gansu were massacred by Qing Banner general Li Shiyao during a 1784 uprising by Hui Jahriyya Muslims Zhang Wenqing and Tian Wu, 3 years after an early 1781 rebellion by Salar Sufi Jahriyya members when the Qing executed Jahriya leader Ma Mingxin. The Qing government under Qianlong then ordered the extermination of the Sufi Jahriya "New Teaching" and banned adoption of non-Muslim children by Muslims, converting non-Muslims to Muslim and banning new mosques from being built. Some Sufi Khafiya "Old Teaching" Muslims still served in Qing forces in fighting against the Jahriya Sufi "New Teaching" Muslims despite the fact that those laws forbdding them from spreading their religion applied to them too. Li Shiyao was a member of the Qing Eight Banners and related to the Qing royal family.

=== Christianity ===
The persecution of Christians by Yongzheng became even worse during the Qianlong reign.

=== Palaces ===
Consorts and children of the Qianlong Emperor

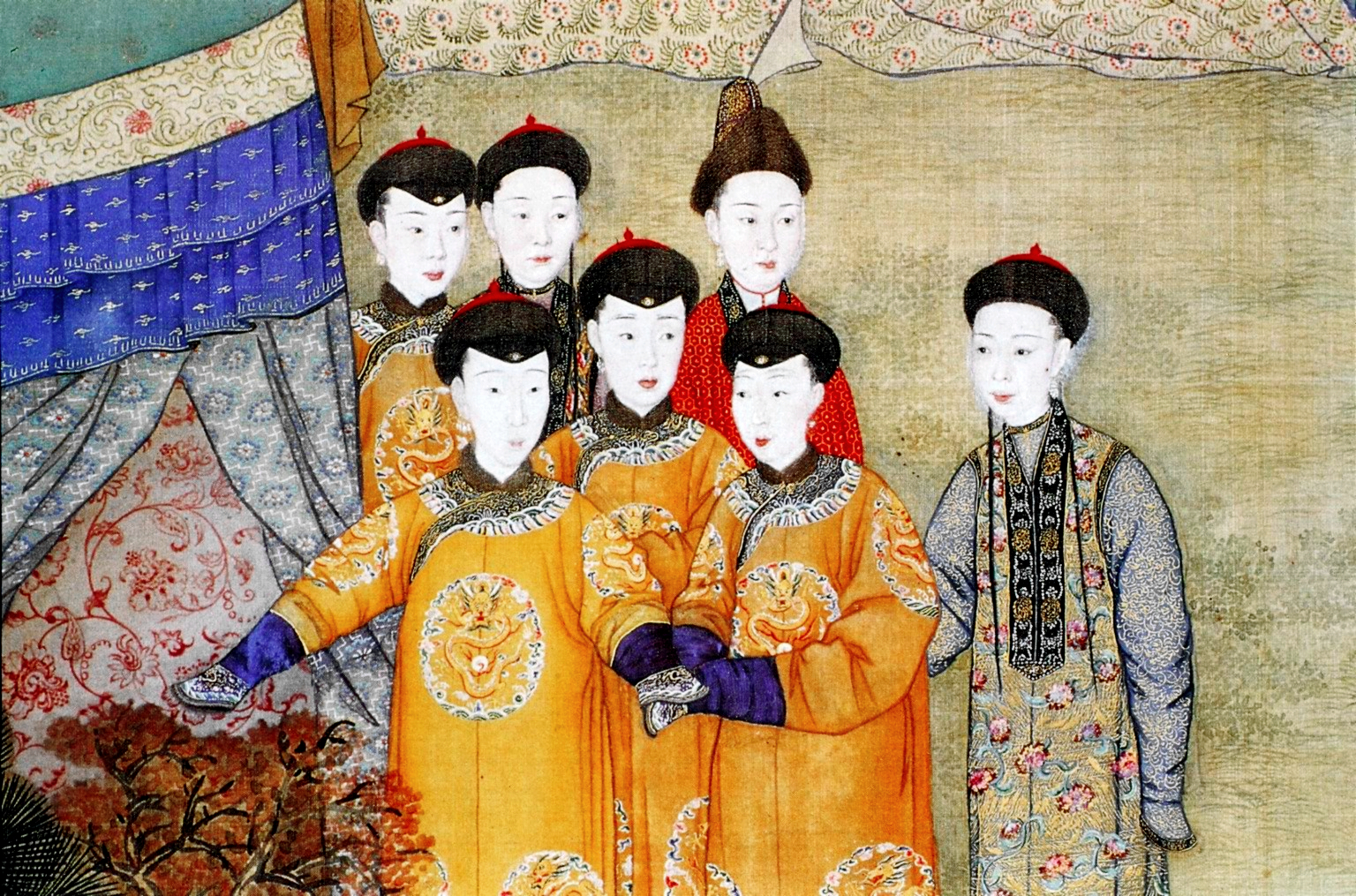
Consorts of the Qianlong Emperor

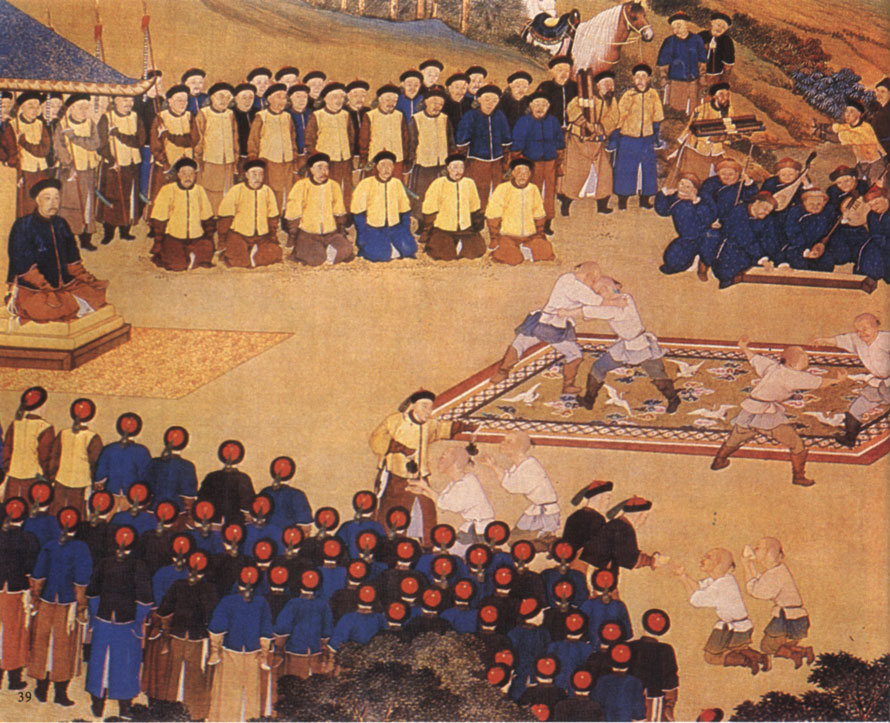
The Qianlong Emperor watching a wrestling match

The Qianlong Emperor was an aggressive builder. In the hills northwest of Beijing, he expanded the villa known as the Garden of Perfect Brightness (or Yuanmingyuan; now known as the Old Summer Palace) originally built by his father. He eventually added two new villas, the "Garden of Eternal Spring" and the "Elegant Spring Garden". In time, the Old Summer Palace would encompass 860 acres (350 hectares), five times larger than the Forbidden City. To celebrate the 60th birthday of his mother, Empress Dowager Chongqing, Qianlong Emperor ordered a lake at the Garden of Clear Ripples (or Qingyiyuan; now known as the Summer Palace) dredged, named it Kunming Lake, and renovated a villa on the eastern shore of the lake.

The Qianlong Emperor also expanded the imperial summer palace in Rehe Province, beyond the Great Wall. Rehe eventually became effectively a third capital and it was at Rehe that the Qianlong Emperor held court with various Mongol nobles. The emperor also spent time at the Mulan hunting grounds north of Rehe, where he held the imperial hunt each year.

==== European styles ====
For the Old Summer Palace, the Qianlong Emperor commissioned the Italian Jesuit Giuseppe Castiglione for the construction of the Xiyang Lou, or Western-style mansion, to satisfy his taste for exotic buildings and objects. He also commissioned the French Jesuit Michel Benoist, to design a series of timed waterworks and fountains complete with underground machinery and pipes, for the amusement of the imperial family. The French Jesuit Jean Denis Attiret also became a painter for the emperor. Jean-Damascène Sallusti was also a court painter. He co-designed, with Castiglione and Ignatius Sichelbart, the Battle Copper Prints.

==== Other architecture ====
During the Qianlong Emperor's reign, the Emin Minaret was built in Turpan to commemorate Emin Khoja, a Uyghur leader from Turpan who submitted to the Qing Empire as a vassal in order to obtain assistance from the Qing to fight the Dzunghars.

=== Descendants of the Ming dynasty's imperial family ===
In 1725, the Yongzheng Emperor bestowed an hereditary marquis title on a descendant of Zhu Zhilian, a descendant of the imperial family of the Ming dynasty. Zhu was also paid by the Qing government to perform rituals at the Ming tombs and induct the Chinese Plain White Banner into the Eight Banners. Zhu was posthumously awarded the title "Marquis of Extended Grace" in 1750, and the title was passed on for 12 generations in his family until the end of the Qing dynasty. However, it has been argued that Zhu Zhilian, in fact, had no relation to the imperial family at all.

=== Banner system ===
The Qianlong Emperor instituted a policy of "Manchu-fying" the Eight Banner system, which was the basic military and social organisation of the dynasty. In the early Qing era, Nurhaci and Hong Taiji categorised Manchu and Han ethnic identity within the Eight Banners based on culture, lifestyle and language, instead of ancestry or genealogy. Han Bannermen were an important part of the Banner System. The Qianlong Emperor changed this definition to one of descent, and demobilised many Han Bannermen and urged Manchu Bannermen to protect their cultural heritage, language and martial skills. The emperor redefined the identity of Han Bannermen by saying that they were to be regarded as of having the same culture and being of the same ancestral extraction as Han civilians Conversely, he emphasised the martial side of Manchu culture and reinstituted the practice of the annual imperial hunt as begun by his grandfather, leading contingents from the Manchu and Mongol banners to the Mulan hunting grounds each autumn to test and improve their skills.

The Qianlong Emperor's view of the Han Bannermen also differed from that of his grandfather in deciding that loyalty in itself was most important quality. He sponsored biographies which depicted Chinese Bannermen who defected from the Ming to the Qing as traitors and glorifying Ming loyalists. Some of the Qianlong Emperor's inclusions and omissions on the list of traitors were political in nature. Some of these actions were including Li Yongfang (out of his dislike for Li Yongfang's descendant, Li Shiyao) and excluding Ma Mingpei (out of concern for his son Ma Xiongzhen's image).

The identification and interchangeability between "Manchu" and "Banner people" (Qiren) began in the 17th century. Banner people were differentiated from civilians (Chinese: Minren, Manchu: Irgen; or Chinese: Hanren, Manchu: Nikan) and the term "Bannermen" was becoming identical with "Manchu" in the general perception. The Qianlong Emperor referred to all Bannermen as Manchu, and Qing laws did not say "Manchu", but "Bannermen".

Select groups of Han Chinese bannermen were mass transferred into Manchu Banners by the Qing, changing their ethnicity from Han Chinese to Manchu. Han Chinese bannermen of Tai Nikan (台尼堪) and Fusi Nikan (抚顺尼堪) backgrounds were moved into the Manchu banners in 1740 by order of the Qianlong Emperor. It was between 1618 and 1629 when the Han Chinese from Liaodong who later became the Fusi Nikan and Tai Nikan defected to the Jurchens (Manchus). These Han Chinese origin Manchu clans continued to use their original Han surnames and are marked as of Han origin on the Qing lists of Manchu clans.

=== Anti-gun measures ===
The Solons were ordered by the Qianlong Emperor to stop using rifles and instead practice traditional archery. The emperor issued an edict for silver taels to be issued for guns turned over to the government.

== Chinese political identity and frontier policy ==
Scholars have different perspectives about the Chinese political identity and frontier policy during the reign of the Qianlong Emperor.

According to Emma Jinhua Teng, the prior Ming's view of empire was a clear cultural and geographical demarcation between civilized Chinese and surrounding "barbarians". Due to Qing's territorial expansion well beyond Ming borders, a different conception of empire is needed. The Qianlong Emperor's view of the Qing emphasized the ideology of "Five Nations Under Heaven", where the Han Chinese, Manchu, Mongols, Tibetans and Hui Muslims were distinct domains or constituent nations/blocs under the umbrella of the Qing empire. Each constituting nation/bloc or domain was understood to possess their distinct history and civilization that led to the creation of the Qing state.

According to Zhao Gang, the Qianlong Emperor identified China and the Qing empire as equivalent, and in treaties and diplomatic papers the Qing Empire called itself "China" or Zhongguo (lit. 'Central State'). He further points out that the Qianlong Emperor rejected earlier ideas that only Han could be subjects of China and only Han land could be considered as part of China, so he redefined China as multiethnic as a result of territorial expansion, saying in 1755 that "there exists a view of China according to which non-Han people cannot become China's subjects and their land cannot be integrated into the territory of China. This does not represent our dynasty's understanding of China, but is instead that of the earlier Han, Tang, Song, and Ming dynasties." The Qianlong Emperor compared his achievements with that of the Han and Tang ventures into Central Asia.

== Han settlement ==
Han Chinese farmers were resettled from north China by the Qing government in the area along the Liao River in order to restore the land to cultivation. Wasteland was reclaimed by Han squatters in addition to other Han people who rented land from Manchu landlords. Despite officially prohibiting Han settlement on the Manchu and Mongol lands, by the 18th century the Qing government decided to settle Han refugees from northern China who were suffering from famine, floods, and drought into Manchuria and Inner Mongolia. Due to this, Han people farmed 500,000 hectares in Manchuria and tens of thousands of hectares in Inner Mongolia by the 1780s. The Qianlong Emperor allowed Han peasants suffering from drought to move into Manchuria despite him issuing edicts in favor of banning them from 1740 to 1776. Han tenant farmers rented or even claimed title to land from the "imperial estates" and Manchu Bannerlands in the area. Besides moving into the Liao area in southern Manchuria, the path linking Jinzhou, Fengtian, Tieling, Changchun, Hulun, and Ningguta was settled by Han people during the Qianlong Emperor's reign, and Han people were the majority in urban areas of Manchuria by 1800. To increase the Imperial Treasury's revenue, the Qing government sold lands along the Songhua River which were previously exclusively for Manchus to Han Chinese at the beginning of the Daoguang Emperor's reign, and Han people filled up most of Manchuria's towns by the 1840s, according to Évariste Régis Huc.

== Later years ==
The Qianlong Emperor in his old age

A valet who accompanied a British diplomatic mission to the Qing court in 1793 described Qianlong in his later years:

The Emperor is about five feet ten inches in height, and of a slender but elegant form; his complexion is comparatively fair, though his eyes are dark; his nose is rather aquiline, and the whole of his countenance presents a perfect regularity of feature, which, by no means, announce the great age he is said to have attained; his person is attracting, and his deportment accompanied by an affability, which, without lessening the dignity of the prince, evinces the amiable character of the man. His dress consisted of a loose robe of yellow silk, a cap of black velvet with a red ball on the top, and adorned with a peacock's feather, which is the peculiar distinction of mandarins of the first class. He wore silk boots embroidered with gold, and a sash of blue girded his waist.

In his later years, the Qianlong Emperor became spoiled with power and glory, disillusioned and complacent in his reign, and started placing his trust in corrupt officials such as Yu Minzhong and Heshen.

As Heshen was the highest ranked minister and most favoured by the Qianlong Emperor at the time, the day-to-day governance of the country was left in his hands, while the emperor himself indulged in the arts, luxuries and literature. When Heshen was executed by the Jiaqing Emperor, the Qing government discovered that Heshen's personal fortune exceeded that of the Qing Empire's depleted treasury, amounting to 900 million silver taels, the total of 12 years of Treasury surplus of the Qing imperial court.

The Qianlong Emperor began his reign with about 33.95 million silver taels in Treasury surplus. At the peak of his reign, c. 1775, even with further tax cuts, the treasury surplus still reached 73.9 million silver taels, a record unmatched by his predecessors, the Kangxi and Yongzheng emperors, both of whom had implemented remarkable tax cut policies.

However, due to numerous factors such as long term embezzlement and corruption by officials, frequent expeditions to the south, huge palace constructions, many war and rebellion campaigns as well as his own extravagant lifestyle, all of these cost the treasury a total of 150.2 million silver taels. This, coupled with his senior age and the lack of political reforms, ushered the beginning of the gradual decline and eventual demise of the Qing Empire, casting a shadow over his political life.

== Embassies ==
=== Durrani Afghan Embassy ===
Fazil Biy, the ruler of Kokand, and other Kyrgyz chieftains pleaded to Ahmad Shah Durrani, the ruler of the Durrani Empire, to aid them against Qing expansionism. Ahmad Shah, delighted to use a casus belli in the name of Islam, accepted, sending men to occupy the regions between Tashkent and Kokand, though these men later withdrew by 1764 as any alliance failed to be forged.

In 1763, Ahmad Shah had dispatched an embassy to the Qing. His aims in this are unknown, however, an embassy allowed Ahmad Shah to establish himself as an emperor. The letter he sent to the Qing emperor Qianlong is missing, but from the Qing reply, the letter seems to have been dedicated to his recent conquests and victory at the third battle of Panipat, and Qing expansion.

The letter positioned Ahmad Shah's expansions as bringing order and stability to areas overrun with rebels and lawlessness (in reference to his campaigns in Iran and India). The battle of Panipat was strongly detailed in the letter, in what was likely a fath-nama, meaning a victory letter or declaration to celebrate ones victory. The Qing emperor ignored the effective threat and downplayed the Afghan victory.

In the second part of the letter, the Qianlong appeared much more defensive, in need of justifying the Qing conquest of the Dzungars and the Altishahr Khojas. He accused them of causing devastation and laying false accusations against him. A report also suggested that Ahmad Shah considered the territories the Qing claimed belonged to the Muslims. In reality, Ahmad Shah possibly wanted to establish spheres of influence, which was similarly done with the Ottomans which divided Iran between them, and a treaty with Bukhara that had established the Amu Darya as the border.

Why has your Khan dispatched you? Has your Khan not sent you to appear at an audience with the brilliance of our Great Lord? Our Great Lord is the ruler who has united All under Heaven. Besides you Afghans, as soon as people from the West, Russia, even the former Zunghars came, all of them promptly prostrated themselves before the Great Lord. He is like Heaven; do you not bow before Heaven?

— A Qing grand councillor, remarking at the Afghan envoy's refusal to Kowtow

When the Afghan embassy had arrived in Beijing, the chief envoy, Khwaja Mirhan, had refused to kowtow before the Qing emperor. The Qing officials, in shock, demanded he kowtow, to which Mirhan acquiesced. This incident damaged the Qing-Afghan relations and Qianlong cut ties with the Afghans following this. No immediate consequence occurred, and the envoy was given favor.

Mirhan's refusal possibly came out of religious reasons, but the Qing received it as Ahmad Shah declaring himself equal to Qianlong. Qianlong, however, was reconciliatory and instead shifted blame on their escort. From Qianlong's view, he saw the Afghans as a significant power and attempted to impress the envoy and in contrast, Ahmad Shah, of the Qing empire. This was especially done in motivation of Altishahr's recent conquest and concerns over stability in the region.

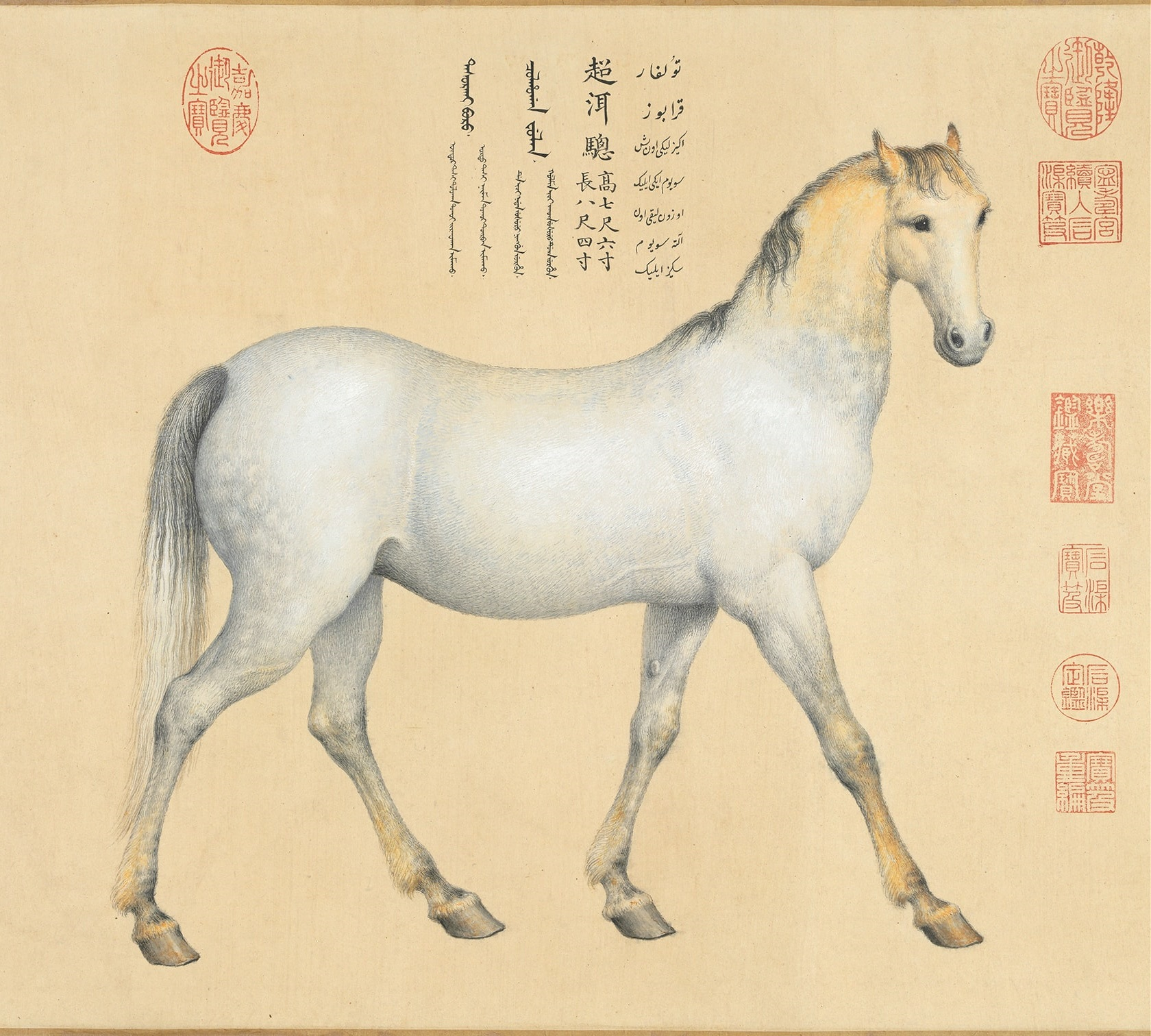
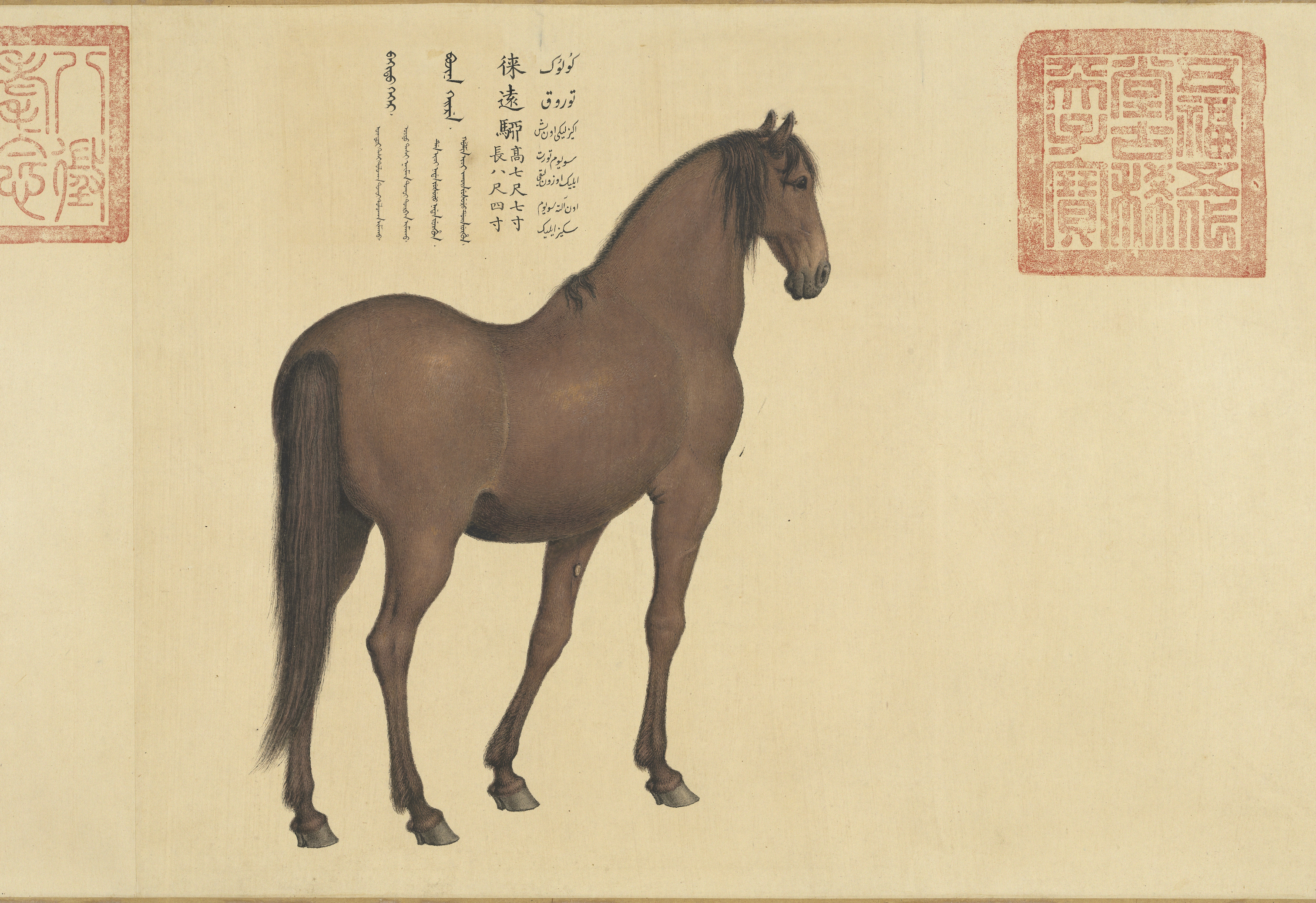
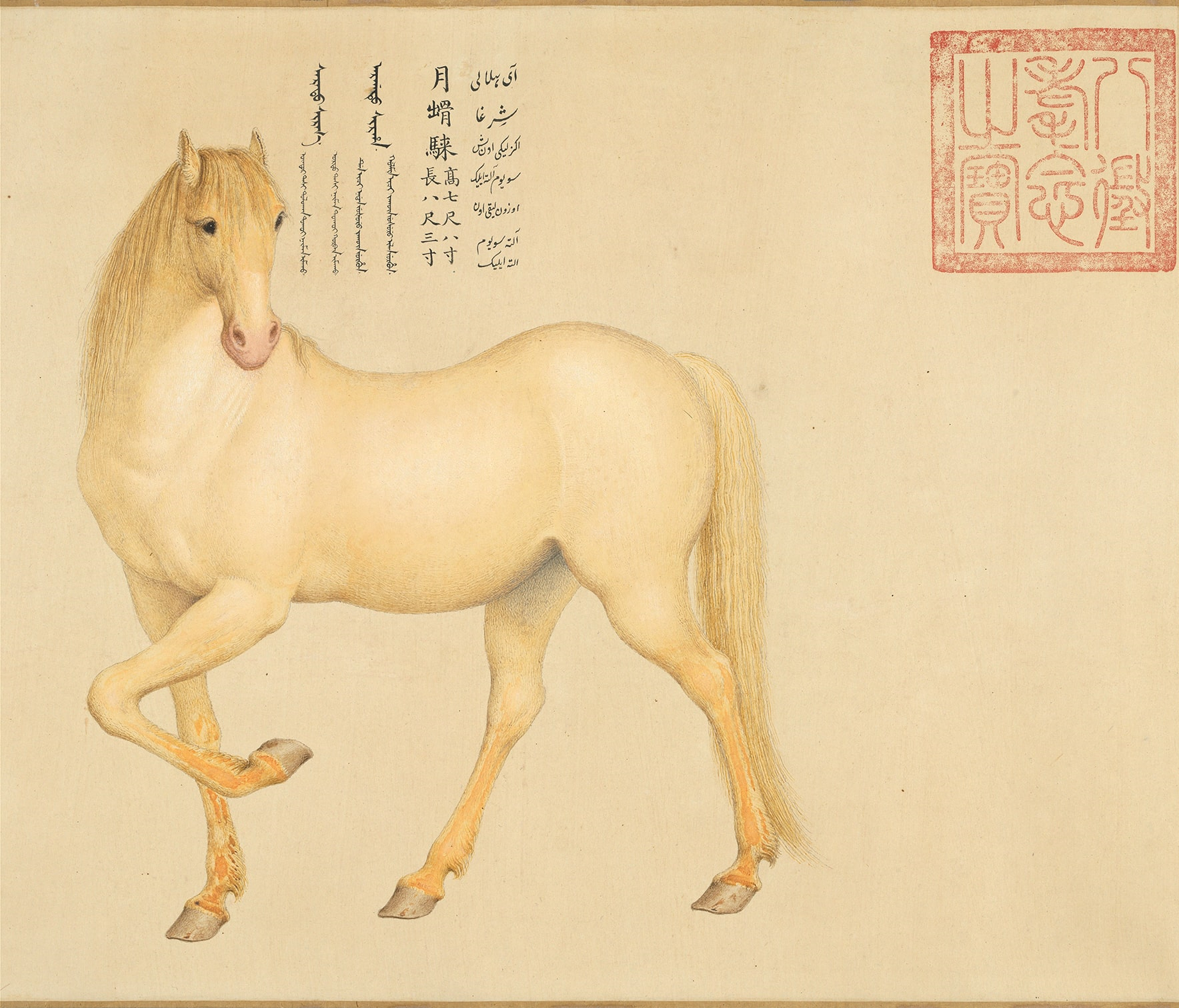
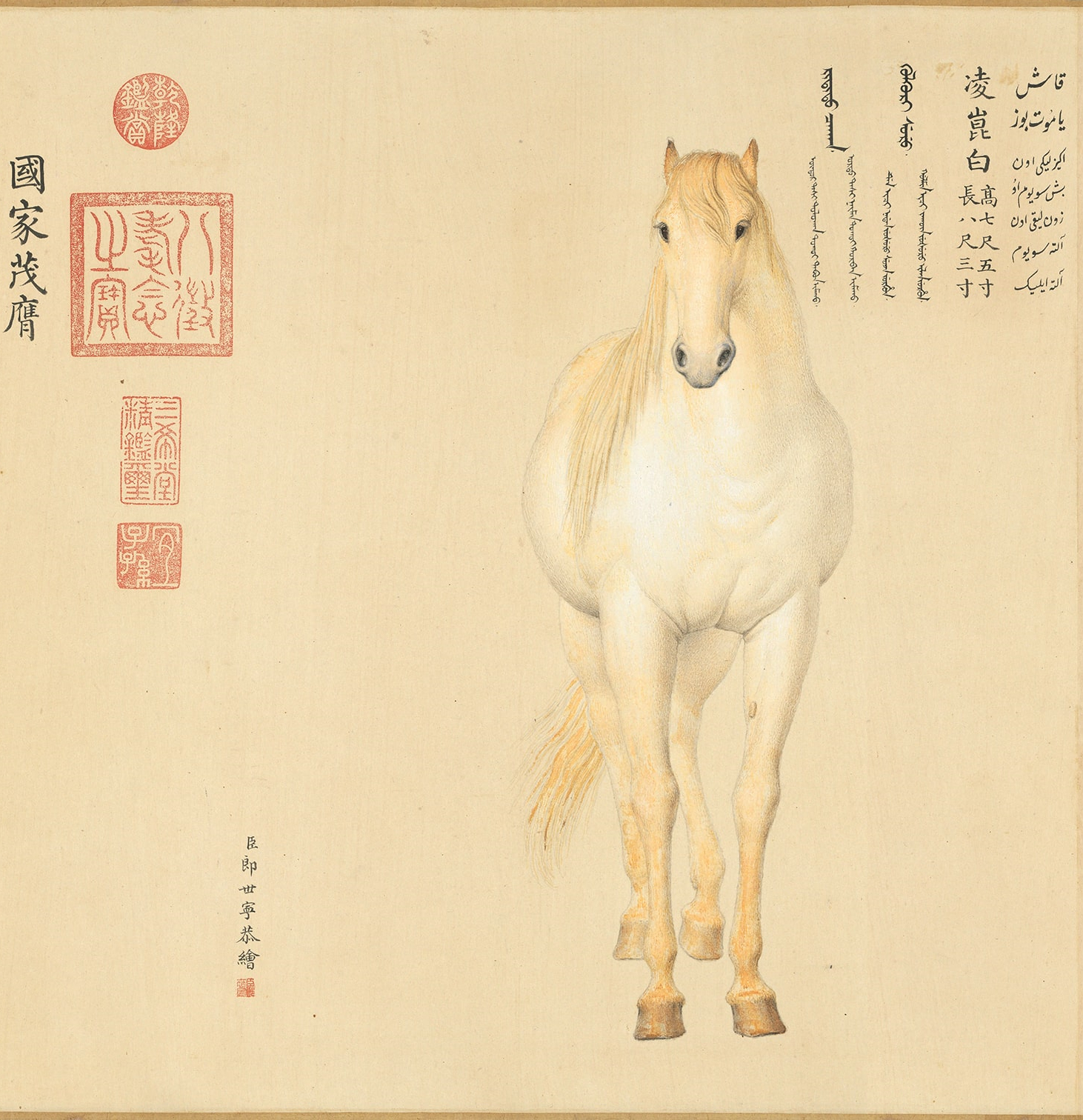
Depiction of the four Afghan horses sent by Ahmad Shah, painted by Qing court painter Giuseppe Castiglione

Ahmad Shah's gifts included four horses, which were painted by the Qing court painter, Giuseppe Castiglione. Nonetheless, by the time of the envoy's return journey to Afghanistan, Qianlong made preparations to secure Qing territories.

In 1759, as the revolt of the Altishahr Khojas crumbled, two descendants of the Afaqi Sufi lineage crossed into Badakhshan, being pursued by the Qing forces. Fude, the Qing general of the expedition, demanded that Sultan Shah, the ruler of Badakhshan, to arrest the brothers. Sultan Shah accepted, likely wishing to have Qing military aid, especially against the Durrani Empire. Distrust occurred between the Qing and Sultan Shah due to the Afaqi descendants residing in Badakhshan for months, including Sultan Shah's possible initial refusal to hand them over, possibly intending to send them to Bukhara. Qianlong threatened invasion, which did not occur as one of the descendant's remains were sent to Yarkand.

The death of the Afaqi brothers spurned relations with the Afghans, causing Sultan Shah to plead to the Qing, claiming that Ahmad Shah intended to exact revenge for their deaths. No immediate Afghan invasion occurred. The Qing however, faced numerous frustrations with their tributaries in Central Asia, including a major revolt in Uch-Turfan that required tremendous effort to defeat.

As a result, Qianlong adopted a policy of strict non-interference, realizing that Qing troops in Altishahr were significantly stretched and spread thin. The Afghans, however, seen as a threat, would show the weakness of Qing control in the region.

In August 1768, Qianlong was informed of the Afghan invasion of Badakhshan led by Shah Wali Khan in May, with Afghan forces seizing Sultan Shah's capital, Fayzabad, who fled north. A Qing agent, Yunggui, held the position that the Qing should interfere in the conflict. Qianlong, however, affirmed that military intervention would be irrational, and strictly forbade any military interference. Historians see this as surprising, as the invasion by the Afghans threatened the Qing Empire itself.

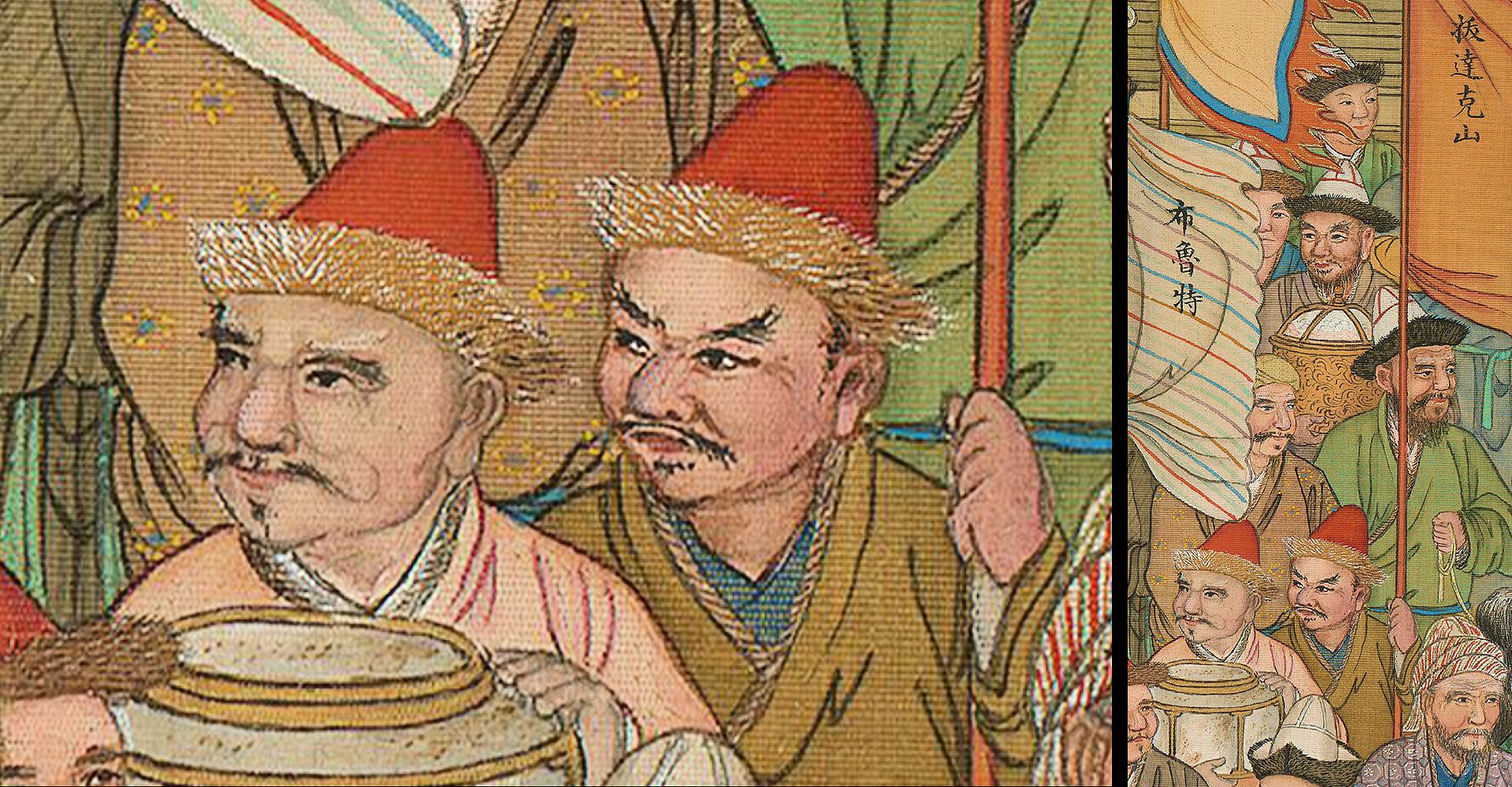
Delegates from Badakhshan in Peking, 1761

Qing sources affirm that the Afghans established Sarimsaq, a child of the Afaqi's who escaped to Badakhshan, in Kunduz. Qianlong was distraught, as another possible revolt could revolve around Sarimsaq, with reports of Muslim travelers and funds being sent to Sarimsaq. This still did not convince Qianlong to act, and he refused to send any message negatively to Ahmad Shah at all. During this, Sultan Shah defeated the Afghan governor and reoccupied his capital, but feared another Afghan invasion, sending desperate letters to the Qing in the winter of 1768 to ask for help, claiming that Ahmad Shah would invade next year.

Qianlong harshly rebutted, blaming Sultan Shah for provoking the conflict with the Afghans and affirmed that he would only fight the Afghans if they actually invaded Qing territory. Sultan Shah wrote a letter to Emin Khoja in response in August 1769, expecting aid as he was a vassal, only to find himself totally abandoned. In December 1769, Sultan Shah wrote another letter which Qianlong received that accused him of failing to uphold his duties. Qianlong rebuked him, and stated that under no circumstances would the Qing aid him.

We have long known that you have previously presented gifts to the Afghans. That you now have no more options but to evade the issue just shows that you are paying tribute to the Afghans! […] If you cannot protect your own lands, and wish to submit to the Afghans, then suit yourself! […] If you wish to rely on our armies to serve your enmities and to subjugate your neighboring tribes, then we will under no circumstances provide you with our troops.

— Qianlong's reply to Sultan Shah's plea for aid against Ahmad Shah

Qianlong had initially considered the Afghans tributaries, but after the former incident, he no longer even sought the prospect of any form of Durrani submission. His reply to Sultan Shah effectively saw the Qing recognize the Afghans as a rival power to them, with Qianlong recognizing that the Afghans were unable to be treated like tributaries. Rather than aiding the ruler of Badakhshan as his initial policy had implicated him to, Qianlong instead justified the Afghan invasion, prompted to by overextended armies, the distance, and stability. Instead, gambling on the difficult terrain between the Afghan and Qing realms for safety.

Within the year, Ahmad Shah occupied Badakhshan and Sultan Shah was executed.

=== Macartney Embassy ===
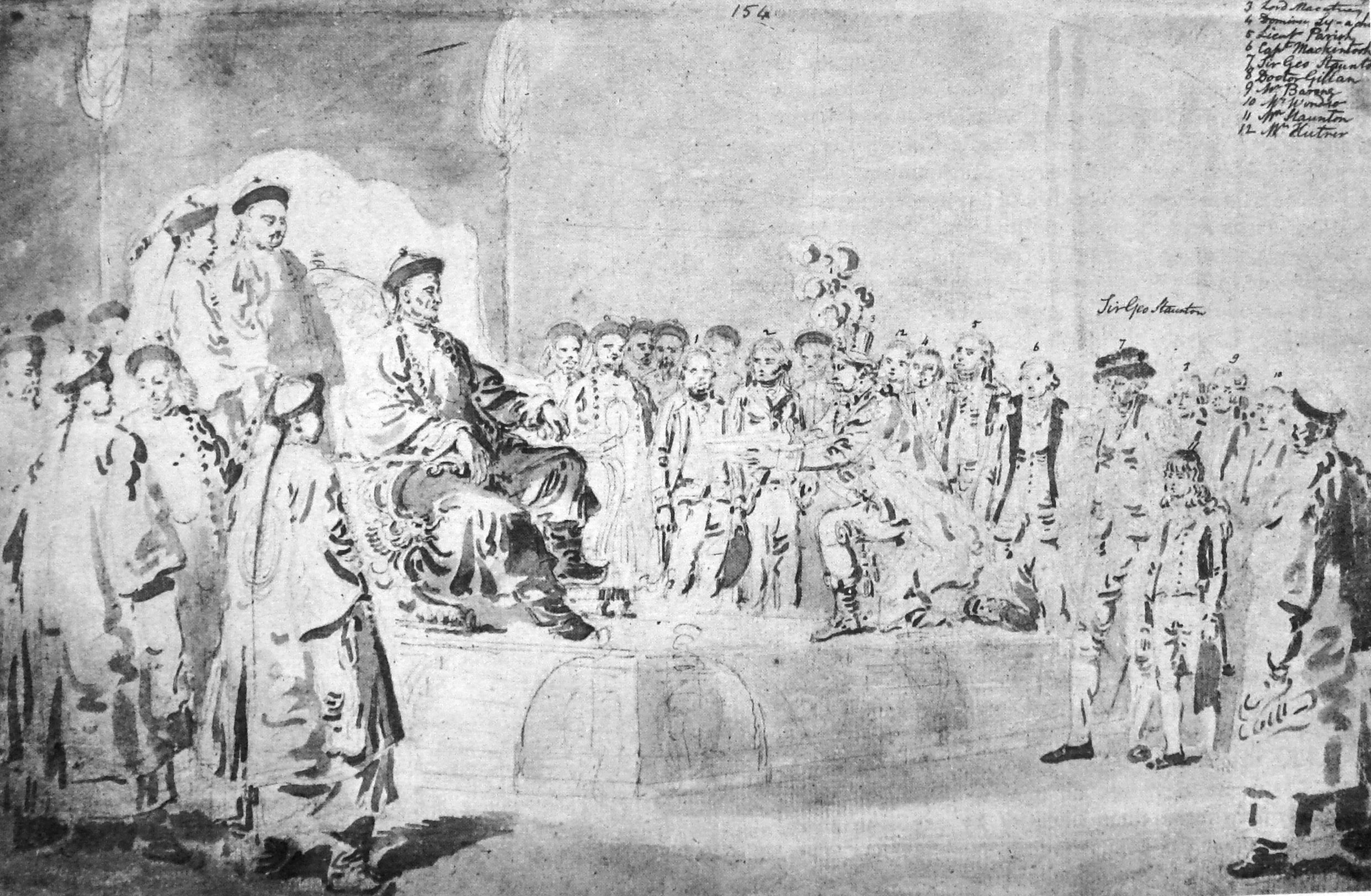
Lord Macartney's embassy, 1793

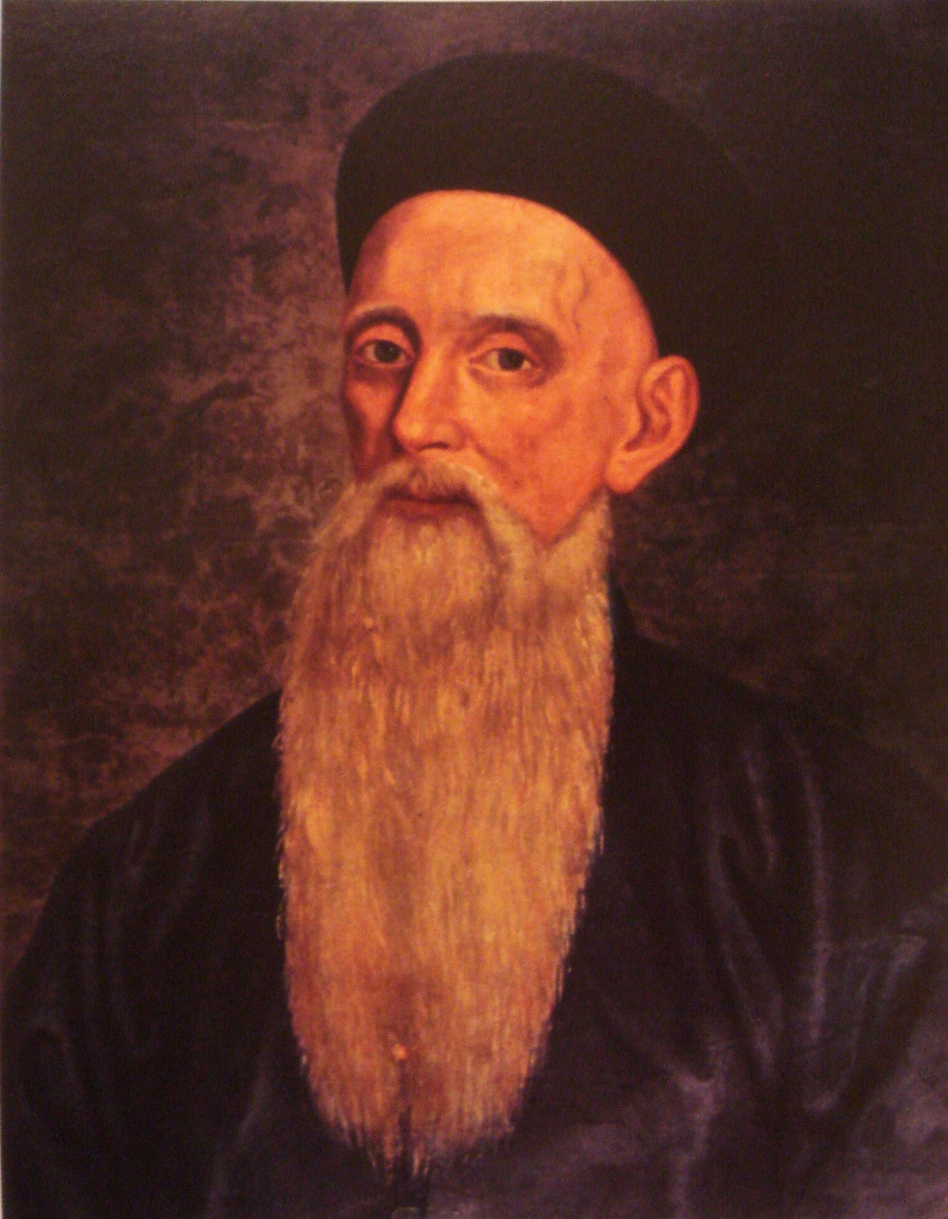
The French Jesuit Jean Joseph Marie Amiot (1718–1793) was the official translator of Western languages for the Qianlong Emperor.

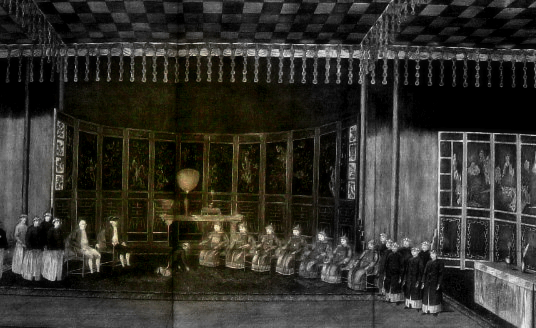
Illustration depicting the last European delegation to be received at the Qianlong Emperor's court in 1795 – Isaac Titsingh (seated European with hat, far left) and A.E. van Braam Houckgeest (seated European without hat)

Legal trade in the South China Sea was resumed in 1727, but the East India Company's discovery that the prices and duties at Ningbo were both much lower than those at Guangzhou prompted them to begin shifting their trade north from 1755 to 1757. The Qianlong Emperor's attempt to discourage this through higher fees failed; in the winter of 1757, he declared that—effective the next year—Guangzhou (then romanized as "Canton") was to be the only Chinese port permitted to foreign traders, beginning the Canton System, with its Cohong and Thirteen Factories.

During the mid-18th century, European powers began to pressure for increases in the already burgeoning foreign trade and for outposts on the Chinese coast, demands which the aging Qianlong emperor resisted. In 1793 King George III sent a large-scale delegation to present their requests directly to the emperor in Beijing, headed by George Macartney, one of the country's most seasoned diplomats. The British sent a sample of trade goods that they intended to sell in China; this was misinterpreted as tribute that was adjudged to be of low quality.

Historians both in China and abroad long presented the failure of the mission to achieve its goals as a symbol of China's refusal to change and inability to modernize. They explain the refusal first on the fact that interaction with foreign kingdoms was limited to neighbouring tributary states. Furthermore, the worldviews on the two sides were incompatible, China holding entrenched beliefs that China was the "central kingdom". However, after the publication in the 1990s of a fuller range of archival documents concerning the visit, these claims have been challenged. One historian characterized the emperor and his court as "clearly clever and competent political operators", and concluded that they acted within the formal Qing claims to universal rule; they reacted prudently to reports of British expansion in India by placating the British with unspecified promises in order to avoid military conflicts and loss of trade.

Macartney was granted an audience with the Qianlong Emperor on two days, the second of which coincided with the emperor's 82nd birthday. There is continued debate about the nature of the audience and what level of ceremonials were performed. Macartney wrote that he resisted demands that the British trade ambassadors kneel and perform the kowtow and debate continues as to what exactly occurred, differing opinions recorded by Qing courtiers and British delegates.

Qianlong gave Macartney a letter for the British king stating the reasons that he would not grant Macartney's requests:

Yesterday your Ambassador petitioned my Ministers to memorialise me regarding your trade with China, but his proposal is not consistent with our dynastic usage and cannot be entertained. Hitherto, all European nations, including your own country's barbarian merchants, have carried on their trade with our Celestial Empire at Canton. Such has been the procedure for many years, although our Celestial Empire possesses all things in prolific abundance and lacks no product within its own borders.

Your request for a small island near Chusan, where your merchants may reside and goods be warehoused, arises from your desire to develop trade... Consider, moreover, that England is not the only barbarian land which wishes to establish... trade with our Empire: supposing that other nations were all to imitate your evil example and beseech me to present them each and all with a site for trading purposes, how could I possibly comply? This also is a flagrant infringement of the usage of my Empire and cannot possibly be entertained.

Hitherto, the barbarian merchants of Europe have had a definite locality assigned to them at Aomen for residence and trade, and have been forbidden to encroach an inch beyond the limits assigned to that locality.... If these restrictions were withdrawn, friction would inevitably occur between the Chinese and your barbarian subjects...

Regarding your nation's worship of the Lord of Heaven, it is the same religion as that of other European nations. Ever since the beginning of history, sage Emperors and wise rulers have bestowed on China a moral system and inculcated a code, which from time immemorial has been religiously observed by the myriads of my subjects. There has been no hankering after heterodox doctrines. Even the European (missionary) officials in my capital are forbidden to hold intercourse with Chinese subjects...

The letter was unknown to the public until 1914, when it was translated, then later used as a symbol of China's refusal to modernize.

Macartney's conclusions in his memoirs were widely quoted:

The Empire of China is an old, crazy, first-rate Man of War, which a fortunate succession of able and vigilant officers have contrived to keep afloat for these hundred and fifty years past, and to overawe their neighbours merely by her bulk and appearance. But whenever an insufficient man happens to have the command on deck, adieu to the discipline and safety of the ship. She may, perhaps, not sink outright; she may drift some time as a wreck, and will then be dashed to pieces on the shore; but she can never be rebuilt on the old bottom.

=== Titsingh Embassy ===
A Dutch embassy arrived at the Qianlong Emperor's court in 1795, which would turn out to be the last time any European appeared before the Qing imperial court within the context of traditional Chinese imperial foreign relations.

Representing Dutch and Dutch East India Company interests, Isaac Titsingh traveled to Beijing in 1794–95 for celebrations of the 60th anniversary of the Qianlong Emperor's reign. The Titsingh delegation also included the Dutch-American Andreas Everardus van Braam Houckgeest, whose detailed description of this embassy to the Qing court was soon after published in the United States and Europe. Titsingh's French translator, Chrétien-Louis-Joseph de Guignes, published his own account of the Titsingh mission in 1808. Voyage a Pékin, Manille et l'Ile de France provided an alternate perspective and a useful counterpoint to other reports that were then circulating. Titsingh himself died before he could publish his version of events.

In contrast to Macartney, Isaac Titsingh, the Dutch and VOC emissary in 1795 did not refuse to kowtow. In the year following Macartney's rebuff, Titsingh and his colleagues were much feted by the Chinese because of what was construed as seemly compliance with conventional court etiquette.

== Abdication ==
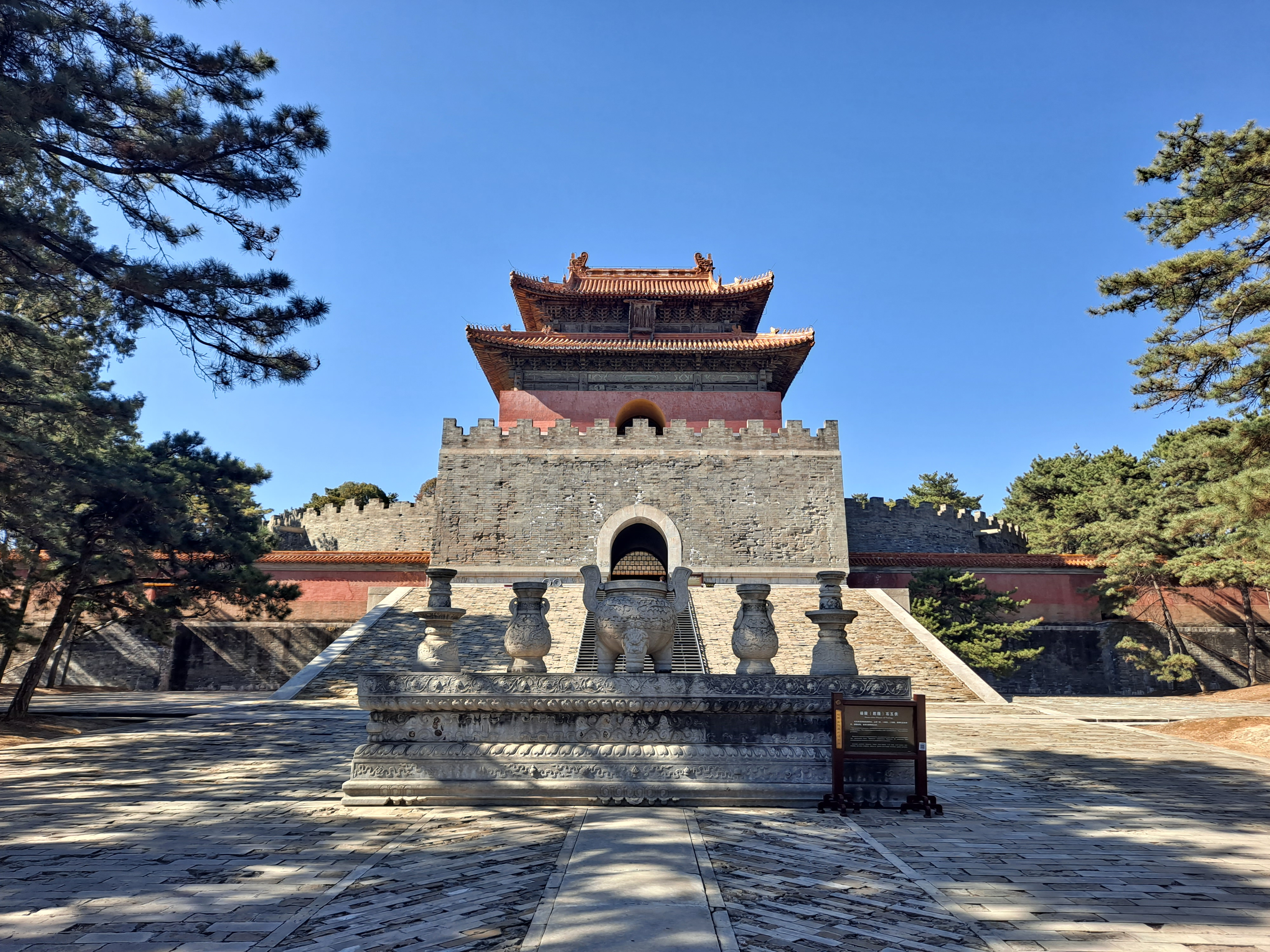
Tomb of the Qianlong Emperor

In October 1795, the Qianlong Emperor officially announced that in the spring of the following year he would voluntarily abdicate at the age of 85 and pass the throne to his son. It was said that the Qianlong Emperor had made a promise during the year of his ascension not to rule longer than his grandfather, the Kangxi Emperor, who had reigned for 61 years. For the next three years, he held the title Taishang Huang (or Emperor Emeritus; 太上皇) even though he continued to hold on to power and the Jiaqing Emperor ruled only in name.

The Qianlong Emperor anticipated moving out of the Hall of Mental Cultivation (Yangxindian) in the Forbidden City. The hall had been conventionally dedicated for the exclusive use of the reigning sovereign, and in 1771 the emperor ordered the beginning of construction on what was ostensibly intended as his retirement residence in another part of the Forbidden City: a lavish, two-acre walled retreat called the Palace of Tranquil Longevity (Ningshou Palace), which is today more commonly known as the "Qianlong Garden". He never moved into his retirement suites in the Qianlong Garden and died in 1799. The complex, completed in 1776, is currently undergoing a ten-year restoration led by the Palace Museum in Beijing and the World Monuments Fund (WMF). The first of the restored apartments, the Qianlong Emperor's Studio of Exhaustion From Diligent Service (Juanqinzhai) began an exhibition tour of the United States in 2010.

== Family ==
- Empress Xiaoxianchun (孝賢純皇后), of the Fuca clan (富察氏; 28 March 1712 – 8 April 1748)
  - First daughter (3 November 1728 – 14 February 1730)
  - Yonglian (永璉), Crown Prince Duanhui (端慧皇太子; 9 August 1730 – 23 November 1738), second son
  - Princess Hejing of the First Rank (固倫和敬公主; 31 July 1731 – 30 September 1792), third daughter
    - Married Septeng Baljur (色布騰巴爾珠爾; d. 1775), of the Khorchin Borjigin clan, in April/May 1747, and had issue (one son, four daughters)
  - Yongcong (永琮), Prince Zhe of the First Rank (哲親王; 27 May 1746 – 29 January 1748), seventh son
- Empress (皇后), of the Nara clan (那拉氏; 11 March 1718 – 19 August 1766) (Note: She is the only Qing Empress who did not receive a posthumous name.) (Note: Her maiden clan is a matter of debate, either Ula Nara or Hoifa Nara.)
  - Yongji (永璂), Prince of the Third Rank (貝勒; 7 June 1752 – 17 March 1776), 12th son
  - Fifth daughter (23 July 1753 – 1 June 1755)
  - Yongjing (永璟; 22 January 1756 – 7 September 1757), 13th son
- Empress Xiaoyichun (孝儀純皇后), of the Weigiya clan (魏佳氏; 23 October 1727 – 28 February 1775)
  - Princess Hejing of the First Rank (固倫和靜公主; 10 August 1756 – 9 February 1775), seventh daughter
    - Married Lhawang Dorji (拉旺多爾濟; 1754–1816), of the Khalkha Borjigin clan, in August/September 1770, and had no issue
  - Yonglu (永璐; 31 August 1757 – 3 May 1760), 14th son
  - Princess Heke of the Second Rank (和碩和恪公主; 17 August 1758 – 14 December 1780), ninth daughter
    - Married Jalantai (|札蘭泰; d. 1788), of the Uya clan, in August/September 1772, and had issue (one daughter)
  - Stillbirth at eight months (13 November 1759)
  - Yongyan (永琰), the Jiaqing Emperor (嘉慶帝; 13 November 1760 – 2 September 1820), 15th son
  - 16th son (13 January 1763 – 6 May 1765)
  - Yonglin (永璘), Prince Qingxi of the First Rank (慶僖親王; 17 June 1766 – 25 April 1820), 17th son
- Imperial Noble Consort Huixian (慧賢皇貴妃), of the Gaogiya clan (高佳氏; 1711 – 25 February 1745)
- Imperial Noble Consort Zhemin (哲憫皇貴妃), of the Fuca clan (富察氏; d. 20 August 1735)
  - Yonghuang (永璜), Prince Ding'an of the First Rank (定安親王; 5 July 1728 – 21 April 1750), first son
  - Second daughter (1 June 1731 – 6 January 1732)
- Imperial Noble Consort Shujia (淑嘉皇貴妃), of the Gingiya clan (金佳氏; 14 September 1713 – 17 December 1755)
  - Yongcheng (永珹), Prince Lüduan of the First Rank (履端親王; 21 February 1739 – 5 April 1777), fourth son
  - Yongxuan (永璇), Prince Yishen of the First Rank (仪慎親王; 31 August 1746 – 1 September 1832), eighth son
  - Yongyu (永瑜; 2 August 1748 – 11 June 1749), ninth son
  - Yongxing (永瑆), Prince Chengzhe of the First Rank (成哲親王; 22 March 1752 – 10 May 1823), 11th son
- Imperial Noble Consort Chunhui (純惠皇貴妃), of the Su clan (蘇氏; 13 June 1713 – 2 June 1760)
  - Yongzhang (永璋), Prince Xun of the Second Rank (循郡王; 15 July 1735 – 26 August 1760), third son
  - Yongrong (永瑢), Prince Zhizhuang of the First Rank (質莊親王; 28 January 1744 – 13 June 1790), sixth son
  - Princess Hejia of the Second Rank (和碩和嘉公主; 24 December 1745 – 29 October 1767), fourth daughter
    - Married Fulong'an (福隆安; 1746–1784), of the Fuca clan, on 10 May 1760, and had issue (two sons)
- Imperial Noble Consort Qinggong (慶恭皇貴妃), of the Lu clan (陸氏; 12 August 1724 – 21 August 1774)
- Noble Consort Xin (忻貴妃), of the Daigiya clan (戴佳氏; 26 June 1737 – 28 May 1764)
  - Sixth daughter (24 August 1755 – 27 September 1758)
  - Eighth daughter (16 January 1758 – 17 June 1767)
  - Obstructed labor or stillbirth at eight months (28 May 1764)
- Noble Consort Yu (愉貴妃), of the Keliyete clan (珂里葉特氏; 15 June 1714 – 9 July 1792)
  - Yongqi (永琪), Prince Rongchun of the First Rank (榮純親王; 23 March 1741 – 16 April 1766), fifth son
- Noble Consort Xun (循貴妃), of the Irgen Gioro clan (伊爾根覺羅氏; 29 October 1758 – 10 January 1798)
- Noble Consort Ying (穎貴妃), of the Baarin clan (巴鄰氏; 7 March 1731 – 14 March 1800)
- Noble Consort Wan (婉貴妃), of the Chen clan (陳氏; 1 February 1717 – 10 March 1807)
- Consort Shu (舒妃), of the Yehe Nara clan (葉赫那拉; 7 July 1728 – 4 July 1777)
  - Yongyue (永玥; 12 June 1751 – 7 July 1753), 10th son
- Consort Yu (豫妃), of the Oirat Borjigin clan (博爾濟吉特氏; 12 February 1730 – 31 January 1774)
  - Miscarriage (1759 or 1760)
- Consort Rong (容妃), of the Hezhuo clan (和卓氏; 10 October 1734 – 24 May 1788) (Note: The fictional Fragrant Concubine (香妃; Xiang Fei) is based on her.)
- Consort Dun (惇妃), of the Wang clan (汪氏; 27 March 1746 – 6 March 1806)
  - Princess Hexiao of the First Rank (固倫和孝公主; 2 February 1775 – 13 October 1823), 10th daughter
    - Married Fengšeninde (丰紳殷德; 1775–1810), of the Niohuru clan, on 12 January 1790, and had issue (one son)
  - Miscarriage (1777 or 1778)
- Consort Fang (芳妃), of the Chen clan (陳氏; 24 September 1750 – 7 October 1801)
- Consort Jin (晉妃), of the Fuca clan (富察氏; d. 8 December 1822)
- Concubine Yi (儀嬪), of the Huang clan (黄氏; d. 1 November 1735)
- Concubine Yi (怡嬪), of the Bo clan (柏氏; 1 May 1721 – 30 June 1757)
- Concubine Shen (慎嬪), of the Oirat Bai'ergesi clan (拜爾葛斯氏; d. 4 June 1765)
- Concubine Xun (恂嬪), of the Oirat Huoshuote clan (霍碩特氏; d. 26 August 1761)
- Concubine Cheng (誠嬪), of the Niohuru clan (鈕祜祿氏; d. 29 May 1784)
- Concubine Gong (恭嬪), of the Lin clan (林氏; 26 December 1733 – 27 November 1805)
- Noble Lady Shun (順貴人), of the Niohuru clan (鈕祜祿氏; 3 January 1748 – 9 September 1790)
  - Miscarriage (1776)
- Noble Lady E (鄂貴人), of the Sirin Gioro clan (西林覺羅氏; 24 March 1733 – 25 April 1808)
- Noble Lady Rui (瑞貴人), of the Socoro clan (索取羅氏; d. 26 June 1765)
- Noble Lady Bai (白貴人), of the Bo clan (柏氏; 17 June 1730 – 26 May 1803)
- Noble Lady Lu (祿貴人), of the Lu clan (陸氏; d. 5 May 1788)
- Noble Lady Shou (壽貴人), of a certain clan (某氏; d. 21 February 1809)
- Noble Lady Xiu (秀貴人), of a certain clan (某氏; d. 14 October 1745)
- Noble Lady Shen (慎貴人), of a certain clan (某氏; d. 9 September 1777)
- Noble Lady (贵人), of the Wu clan (武氏; d. 9 December 1781)
- Noble Lady Jin (金貴人) of a certain clan (某氏; d. 9 April 1778)
- Noble Lady Xin (新貴人), of a certain clan (某氏; d. 10 July 1775)
- Noble Lady Fu (福貴人), of a certain clan (某氏; d. 31 August 1764)
- First Class Attendant Kui (揆常在), of a certain clan (某氏; d. 26 May 1756)
- First Class Attendant Yu (裕常在), of the Zhang clan (张氏; d. 1745)
- First Class Attendant Ping (平常在), of a certain clan (某氏; d. 1778)
- First Class Attendant Ning (寧常在), of a certain clan (某氏; d. 1781)
- Second Class Attendant Xiang (祥答应), of a certain clan (某氏; d. 28 March 1773)
- Second Class Attendant Na (那答應), of a certain clan (某氏)
- Second Class Attendant Guan (莞答應), of a certain clan (某氏)
- Second Class Attendant Cai (采答應), of a certain clan (某氏)
- Second Class Attendant (答應), of a certain clan (某氏)
- Mistress (格格), of a certain clan (某氏; d. October 1729)
- Mistress (格格), of a certain clan (某氏; d. November 1730)
- Mistress (格格), of a certain clan (某氏; d. 30 July 1731)
- Mistress (格格), of a certain clan (某氏; d. 23 August 1732)
- Lady-in-waiting (官女子), of a certain clan (某氏)

== Works by the Qianlong Emperor ==
- Ch'ien Lung (emperor of China) (1810). The conquest of the Miao-tse, an imperial poem ... entitled A choral song of harmony for the first part of the Spring [tr.] by S. Weston, from the Chinese. Translated by Stephen Weston. London, England: Printed & Sold by C. & R. Baldwin, New Bridge Street, Black Friars. ISBN 978-1-02-237186-6.

== See also ==
- Jean Joseph Marie Amiot
- Canton System
- Family tree of Chinese monarchs (late)
- Long Corridor
- Manwen Laodang
- Putuo Zongcheng Temple
- Qianlong Dynasty
- Qianlong Tongbao
- Portuguese Macau
- Military of Macau under Portuguese rule
- British Hong Kong
- British Forces Overseas Hong Kong
- Mao Zedong's cult of personality
- Macartney Embassy
- Liu Yong
- Heshen

== Notes ==
Qianlong Emperor House of Aisin Gioro Born: 25 September 1711 Died: 7 February 1799
Regnal titles
Preceded by Yongzheng Emperor	Emperor of the Qing dynasty Emperor of China; 1735–1796	Succeeded by Jiaqing Emperor
