= Consort Jin (Qianlong) =

Unknown
- Consort Jin
- Died: January 19, 1823
- Burial: Yuling Mausoleum
- Spouse: Qianlong Emperor

Consort Jin (1785(?) – January 19, 1823) of the Šarhūda Fuca clan, was a Manchu woman of the Bordered Yellow Banner and was a consort of the Qianlong Emperor.

== Family background ==
Consort Jin came from the Šarhūda Fuca family, the same big family as some important women in the Qing Dynasty, like Empress Xiaoxianchun and Imperial Consort Shushen. Many of them were related to a famous official named Misihan and Empress Xiaoxianchun was his granddaughter. Consort Jin was also part of the same family, but more distantly related. She was the great-grandniece of the Empress.

Misihan’s son Maci had twelve sons. Each son's family was called a "house." Consort Jin's grandfather, Fu Guang, started the fifth house. He was a mid-level government worker and had four sons. The second son, Dekejinge, was Consort Jin’s father. He passed the civil service exams and became a local official (called a magistrate). He had six sons—Consort Jin’s brothers.

Her family mostly worked in lower-ranking government jobs. Although her father worked in government for many years, he didn’t rise to a very high position.

== Married Life ==
=== Title ===
Consort Jin was first called “Jin Guiren” (晋贵人), and in Manchu, it was written as jin gui žin—just a sound-based name, not a name with meaning. Later, when she became a “Consort,” she wasn’t given a new title. Instead, the character “晋” was translated into Manchu as imiyangga, which means “gathered” or “assembled.”

=== Life ===
Consort Jin belonged to the Bordered Yellow Banner of the Manchu people, classified as part of the Outer Eight Banners. It’s likely she entered the palace through the selection process for Eight Banner women. Previous research hasn’t confirmed the exact year of her entry, but the earliest record of her is from a medical file in the third year of the Jiaqing reign, where she is referred to as “Jin Guiren” (Noble Lady Jin). There are no known records about her before that.

Based on available evidence, it's estimated that Consort Jin was selected around the second year of Jiaqing (1797) to serve the Retired Emperor Gaozong (Qianlong Emperor). Palace records from the first year of Jiaqing list the consorts under Gaozong at that time, and Jin Guiren is not mentioned among them. However, by the third year, she appears in medical reports. This suggests she likely entered the palace between the second and third year of Jiaqing. One document from the third month of Jiaqing 3 notes that “on the 28th day of the 12th month last year, two new Noble Ladies entered the palace,” possibly including Consort Jin. Further evidence may clarify this in the future.

If this timeline is correct, she would have entered the palace to serve the Retired Emperor, who was 87 years old at the time. He died in the fourth year of Jiaqing (1799), and Consort Jin lived as a widow from then until her death in the second year of Daoguang (1823). Records also show that in Jiaqing 3, she experienced a skin illness.

== Death And Burial ==
She died on the eighth day of the twelfth month of the second year of Emperor Daoguang's reign. She was probably around 40 years old. Concubine Jin was the last of all the concubines of Emperor Qianlong to be buried in the Yuling Mausoleum.

== In fiction ==
Portrayed by Feng subo in the War and Beauty 2 (2013)
