= Mianqin =

- Beile; Prince Cheng of the Second Rank (posthumously)
- Born: 1768
- Died: 1820 (aged 51–52)
- Spouse: Lady Wumi (烏密氏)
- Issue: Yishou; Yilun; Yifan; Yisheng; Yixu; Yichuo; Yiru
- Father: Yongxing
- Mother: Lady Fuca (富察氏)

Mianqin (Chinese: 綿懃; 1768 – 1820) was an imperial prince of China's Qing dynasty and a grandson of the Qianlong Emperor. He was posthumously accorded the noble title of Prince Cheng of the Second Rank (多羅成郡王).

== Life ==
Mianqin was born as the eldest son of Yongxing and his primary consort, lady Fuca, niece of Empress Xiaoxianchun (daughter of empress' youngest brother, Fuheng).

Initially Mianqin held a title of lesser bulwark duke. In 1796, his second son Yilun, was adopted into Prince Lü peerage due to childlessness of Yongcheng's son, Mianhui. In 1802, he was promoted to beile. He became an only heir apparent of the Prince Cheng peerage, because his brothers Miansi and Mianyi were adopted by childless imperial princes, such as Yongzhang or Yongji. His mother died in November 1813.

Mianqin was posthumously granted a title of Prince Cheng of the Second Rank in 1820.

== Family ==
- Primary consort, of the Wumi clan (嫡福晋 乌密氏)
  - Prince Cheng of the Second Rank Yishou (成郡王 奕绶), first son
  - Seventh son
- Secondary consort, of the Zhaojia clan (侧福晋 赵佳氏)
  - Third son
  - Yiwei (1794–1797)
  - Yisheng (奕绳), sixth son
  - First Class Bulwark General Yiru (一等辅国将军 奕儒; 1809–1845), eighth son
- Secondary consort, of the Wanyan clan (侧福晋 汪佳氏)
  - Yixu (奕续；1820–1854), eleventh son
- Mistress, of the Li clan (妾 李氏)
  - Grace General Yichuo (奉恩将军 奕绰;1818-1863), ninth son
  - Yibian (奕编, 1820–1821), tenth son
- Mistress, of the Zhao clan (妾 赵氏)
  - Prince of the Third Rank Yilun (贝勒 奕伦;1790-1836), second son adopted into Prince Lü peerage by Mianhui
  - Fourth Rank Official Yifan (奕繁;1795-1820), fifth son
