= Gege (title) =

Manchu word for an unmarried daughter

Gege (Manchu: ᡤᡝᡤᡝ; Chinese: 格格; pinyin: Gégé; Wade–Giles: Ko^{2}-ko^{2}) is the Manchu word for an unmarried daughter. During the Qing dynasty, it was the Manchu style of an imperial-born princess of an emperor. Daughters of all imperial princes above the rank of jiangjun also used the same title.

When a Manchu prince had concubines, the status of the wives, from highest to lowest, are the following: difujin (the official wife), cefujin (the first rank concubine), and gege. Historically, there were many gege, but few ever ascended to the status of cefujin. A gege could also be a daughter of imperial princess, even if she was promoted to gulun or heshuo princess. Only difujin and cefujin names are recorded in the imperial family lists of family members.

== Princess ==
Before the establishment of the Qing dynasty, the daughters of khans were referred to as "gege" by personal names or the names of lands they lived after the marriage. After 1658, the personal names of imperial princesses were not recorded in imperial genealogy.All the titles for imperial princesses were conferred upon the marriage. Sometimes title could be granted before the marriage. The following titles were granted to the princesses born to the emperor:

- Gulun Gongzhu (固倫公主), translated as "Gurun Princess", "State Princess" or "Princess of the First Rank", was granted to a daughter born to the Empress. The title included a 2-character honorific name, sometimes a 4-character honorific name, ex. Princess Shuzhe Duanxian of the First Rank, Hong Taiji's seventh daughter born to Empress Xiaozhuangwen. This title could also sometimes be granted to a favored daughter of the Emperor, for ex: Princess Hexiao of the First Rank (固倫和孝公主), the Qianlong Emperor's tenth daughter by his concubine, Consort Dun.
- Heshuo Gongzhu (和碩公主), translated as "Heshuo Princess" or "Princess of the Second Rank", was granted to the daughter born to imperial consort. Prior to the formalization of the rank system, princesses born to imperial concubines could hold ranks lower than Princess of the Second Rank, but no lower than clanswoman (宗女). The title included the 2-character honorific name. The title could also be granted to the daughter of an imperial prince adopted into the palace, for example: Princess Shushen of the Second Rank (和碩淑慎公主), the daughter of Yunreng who was adopted by the Kangxi Emperor.

=== Other titles ===
Prior to the formalization of rank system, there existed several ranks typical for Ming dynasty. The following ranks could be granted solely to Emperor's daughter. The prefixes were included in the whole title.

- Zhang Gongzhu (長公主), Elder Princess or Chief Princess, also translated as Princess Imperial, was granted to the eldest emperor's daughter or emperor's sister. The title was granted to the eldest daughter of Nurhaci and various daughters of Hong Taiji.
- Dazhang Gongzhu (大長公主), Grand Princess Imperial or Princess Supreme, was granted to emperor's paternal aunt. The only to receive this titles is Princess Yongmu, the Kangxi Emperor's paternal aunt.

However, the title of gege was reserved for several mistresses who died before emperor's coronation and were not granted honorific names. A gege could also be adopted into the imperial palace and raised by dowager consorts and the empress dowager if the emperor did not have enough daughters. The following titles were granted to princesses born to imperial clansmen:

- Junzhu (郡主), translated as "Princess of a Commandery" or "Princess of the Third Rank", was granted to the daughter of a Prince of the First Rank born to his Princess Consort. A Junzhu can be promoted to Heshuo Gongzhu (和碩公主) or Gulun Gongzhu (固倫公主) in case of adoption to the imperial palace. The title did not include any honorific names. In rare cases, an honorific name will be given ex. Princess Daokexin of the Third Rank (道恪欣郡主), Boguoduo's second daughter adopted into the palace in childhood. In that case, the honorific name could consist of a maximum of 4 characters. The title could also be granted to the daughter of a First Rank Princess.
- Xianzhu (县主), translated a "Princess of County" or "Princess of the Fourth Rank", was granted to the daughter of a Prince of the Second Rank born to his Princess Consort, as well as the daughter of a shizi (the heir of a first rank prince). A Xianzhu could be promoted to Princess of the Third Rank, ex. because of marriage or in case of father's promotion. Can also be promoted to Heshuo Gongzhu and Gulun Gongzhu in case of adoption. In rare cases, an honorific name will be given, ez. Princess Zhenjie of the Fourth Rank (貞節县主), ninth daughter of Mianqin, Prince Cheng of the First Rank. This title could also be granted to the daughter of a Second Rank Princess.
- Junjun (郡君), translated as "Lady of a Commandery" or "Lady of the First Rank", was granted to the daughter of a Prince of the Third Rank born to his primary consort or the daughter of a Prince of the First Rank born to his secondary consort, as well as daughter of zhangzi (heir of a junwang). A Junjun could be promoted to Xianzhu after she gets married. The title did not convey honorific name.
- Xianjun (县君), translated as "Lady of a County" or "Lady of the Second Rank", was granted to the daughter born to a Prince of the Fourth Rank or the daughter of a Prince of the Second Rank born to his secondary consort.The title did not convey honorific name.
- Xiangjun (乡君), translated as "Lady of a Village" or "Lady of the Third Rank", was granted to the daughter born to a duke with eight privileges (mostly to fuguo duke) or daughter of a Prince of the Third Rank born to his secondary consort. The title did not convey honorific name.

=== Stipends of princesses ===
The following stipends were received annually. Rarely, but princesses could be awarded a double annual stipend and be treated as imperial consorts, ex: Princess Hejing of the First Rank, who was treated as an Imperial Noble Consort and received a double annual stipend. Princesses, who committed a crime, could be stripped of her title and deprived of her stipend.

- Gulun Gongzhu:
  - 400 taels and 400 hu of rice and meal for princesses residing in the capital
  - plus 1000 taels and 30 rolls of fabrics for ones living in vassal states
- Heshuo Gongzhu:
  - 300 taels and 300 hu of rice and meal for princesses residing in the capital
  - plus 400 taels and 15 rolls of fabrics for ones living in vassal states
- Junzhu:
  - 160 taels and 160 hu of rice and meal for princesses residing in the capital
  - plus 160 taels and 12 rolls of fabrics for ones living in vassal states
- Xianzhu:
  - 110 taels and 110 hu of rice and meal for princesses residing in a capital
  - plus 110 taels and 10 rolls of fabrics for ones living in vassal states
- Junjun:
  - 60 taels and 60 hu of rice for those in the capital
  - plus 60 taels and 8 rolls of fabrics for ones living in the vassal states
- Xianjun:
  - 50 taels and 50 hu of rice for those in the capital
  - plus 50 taels and 6 rolls of fabrics for ones living in vassal states
- Xianjun:
  - 40 taels and 40 hu of rice for those in a capital
  - plus 40 taels and 5 rolls of fabrics for ones living in the vassal states

=== Garments for imperial princesses ===
The described garments below were dictated by the "Illustrated Precedents for Ritual Paraphernalia of the Imperial Court" published in 1759.

1. Gulun Gongzhu

- Crown, diadem, earrings, necklace and court robes befitting an imperial princess consort
- Semiformal court robes befitting princess consort of the first rank

2. Heshuo Gongzhu

- Court and semiformal robes befitting imperial princess consort
- Crown and diadem befitting hereditary princess consort of the first rank

3. Junzhu

- Court robes befitting imperial princess consort
- Crown, diadem and semiformal robes befitting princess consort of the second rank

4. Xianzhu

- Crown and diadem befitting princess consort of the third rank
- Semiformal robes befitting princess consort of the second rank
- Court robes befitting imperial princess consort

5. Junjun

- Crown and diadem befitting princess consort of the fourth rank
- Court and semiformal robes befitting princess consort of the third rank

6. Xianjun

- Crown and diadem befitting duchess of the first rank
- Court robes befitting princess consort of the third rank
- Semiformal robes befitting princess consort of the fourth rank

7. Xianjun

- Born to a Duke of the First Rank:
  - Crown and diadem befitting state duchess of the second rank
  - Court robes befitting princess consort of the third rank
  - Semiformal robes befitting duchess of the first rank
- Born to a Duke of the Second Rank:
  - Crown befitting state duchess of the second rank; finial decorated with three pearls enclosed in golden ornaments and ruby
  - Diadem befitting state duchess of the second rank; decorated with three ruyi cloud shaped plaques with pearls and three strings of pearls connected with two lapis lazuli inlaid plaques hanging on the back
  - Court robes befitting princess consort of the third rank
  - Semiformal robes befitting state duchess of the first rank

Gallery

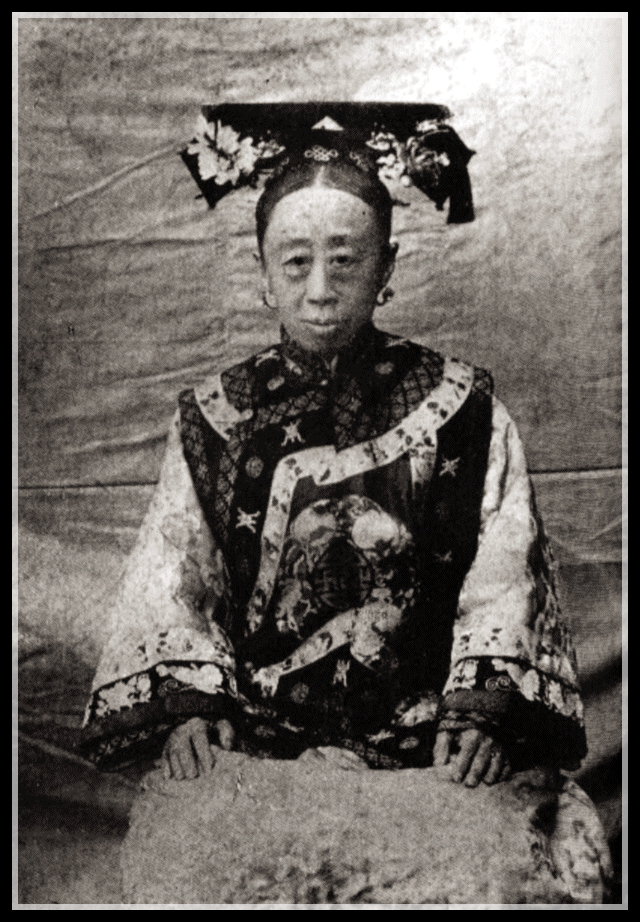
Princess Rongshou of the First Rank, Yixin's biological daughter adopted by Empress Dowager Cixi

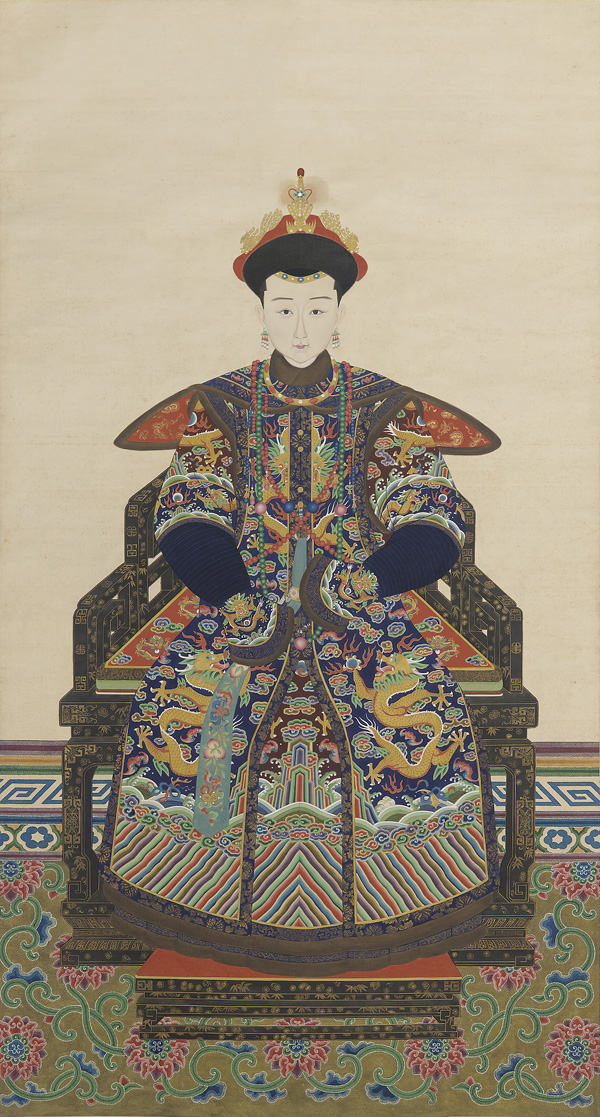
Princess Shouzang of the First Rank, Daoguang Emperor's fifth daughter by Consort Xiang

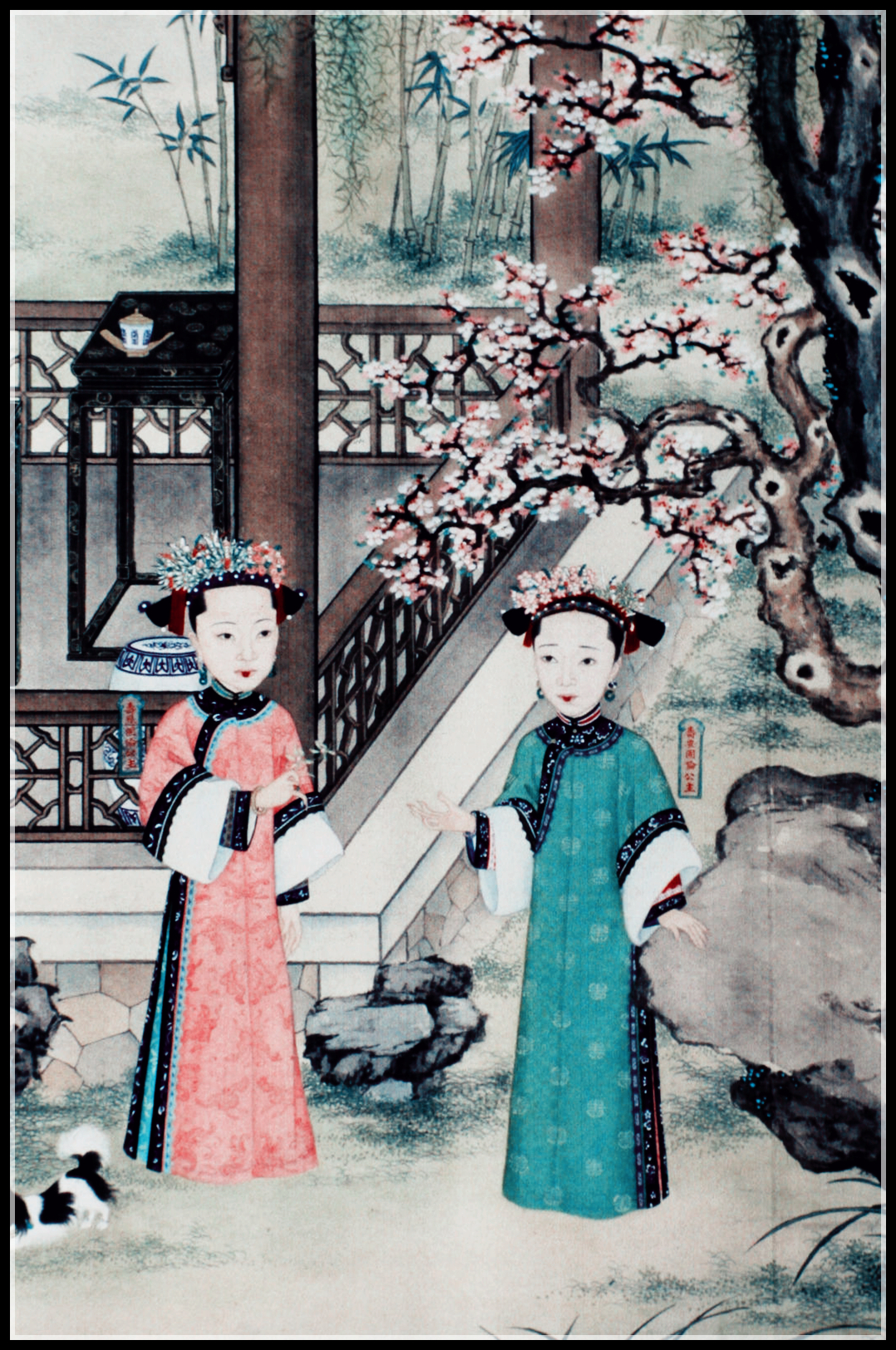
Princesses Shou'en and Shou'an, daughters of the Daoguang Emperor in 1848

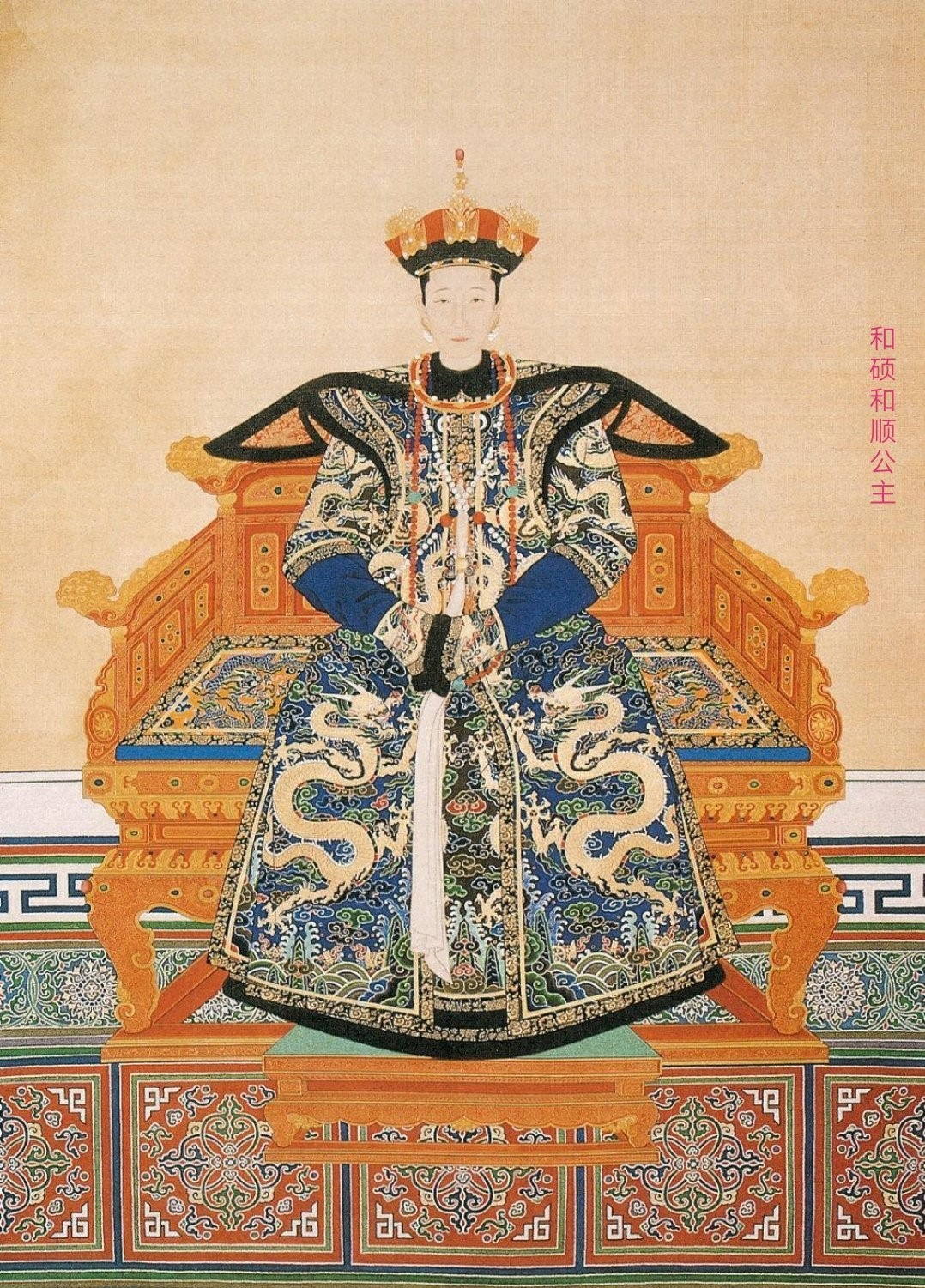
Princess Heshun of the Second Rank, adopted daughter of the Shunzhi Emperor

== Other persons being honoured as gege ==
Sumalagu, a confidant of Empress Dowager Xiaozhuang and foster mother of several Kangxi Emperor's sons, including Yuntao, was addressed as "gege" by the Grand Empress Dowager.

Lady Yehe Nara (1722-1793), wife of Fuheng, a prominent general of the early Qianlong era, was an elder sister of Qianlong Emperor's Consort Shu. During her lifetime, she held a title of first rank Mingfu, madam Fu Zhongyong (傅忠勇夫人). She was described as the most beautiful Manchu woman of Qing dynasty. She was posthumously honoured as "fujin" (title reserved for princesses consorts) as the mother of prince consort Fulong'an, Prince Jiayong of the Second Rank Fuk'anggan.

Yu Derling (1885-1944) was Western-educated court lady of Empress Dowager Cixi. She stayed in the imperial court from 1905 to 1907, when she married Thaddeus C. White. During her stay, she served as a translator when Empress Dowager received foreign guests. She developed a close relationship with empress dowager, as well as with another Qing dynasty princesses (6th daughter of Yikuang) and princesses consorts (Jingrong) interested in modernisation of the Qing empire. She was rewarded a ruyi scepter and a dragon robe befitting an imperial princess. The similar rewards received mother of Deling and her sister, Rongling. In contrast to earlier historiography, Deling was not a member of imperial clan, but claimed Manchu descent despite her family belonged to Plain White Banner Han forces. Moreover, Deling's books were published under the name of princess Der Ling.

== See also ==
- Royal and noble styles
- Lists of Qing dynasty princes consorts
