= Yijing (prince) =

Prince-Regent of the late Qing dynasty

Second Class fuguo jiangjun Yijing

Assistant Grand Secretary
- In office 5 March 1841 – 21 November 1842

Minister of Personnel
- In office 7 November 1836 – 21 November 1842
- Preceded by: Keying
- Succeeded by: Engui

General of Mukden
- In office 23 February 1835 – 7 November 1836
- Preceded by: Baoxing
- Succeeded by: Baoxing

General of Heilongjiang
- In office 12 January 1835 – 23 February 1835
- Preceded by: Fusengde
- Succeeded by: Baochang

Personal details
- Born: 28 October 1791 Beijing
- Died: 14 December 1853 (aged 62) Xuzhou, Jiangsu
- Relations: Yongxing (grandfather)
- Parent: Mianyi (father)

Military service
- Allegiance: Qing dynasty
- Branch/service: Manchu Bordered Red Banner
- Battles/wars: First Opium War; Taiping Rebellion

Yijing (Chinese: 奕經; Wade–Giles: I-ching; 28 October 1791 – 14 December 1853) was a Manchu prince of the Qing Dynasty. He was a cousin of the Daoguang Emperor. In 1826, he served at Kashgar as a junior officer in the campaign against Jahangir Khoja. During the First Opium War, after the British captured Zhenhai and Ningbo, the emperor ordered Yijing to go to Zhejiang on 18 October 1841 and take command of a counter-offensive. In the Battle of Ningpo on 10 March 1842, Yijing's troops attempted to retake the city, but the British successfully repelled the attack.

== See also ==
- Qishan
- Yilibu
- Chen Huacheng
- Ge Yunfei
- Yang Fang
- Lin Zexu
- Yishan
