= Prince Xun =

Prince Xun may refer to any of the following Qing dynasty princely peerages:

- Prince Li (禮) (禮親王), created in 1636, renamed to Prince Xun (巽親王) in 1651
- Prince Xun (恂) (恂郡王), created in 1748
- Prince Xun (循) (循郡王), created in 1760
