= Myōbu =

Title given to ladies of the fifth rank in the imperial court

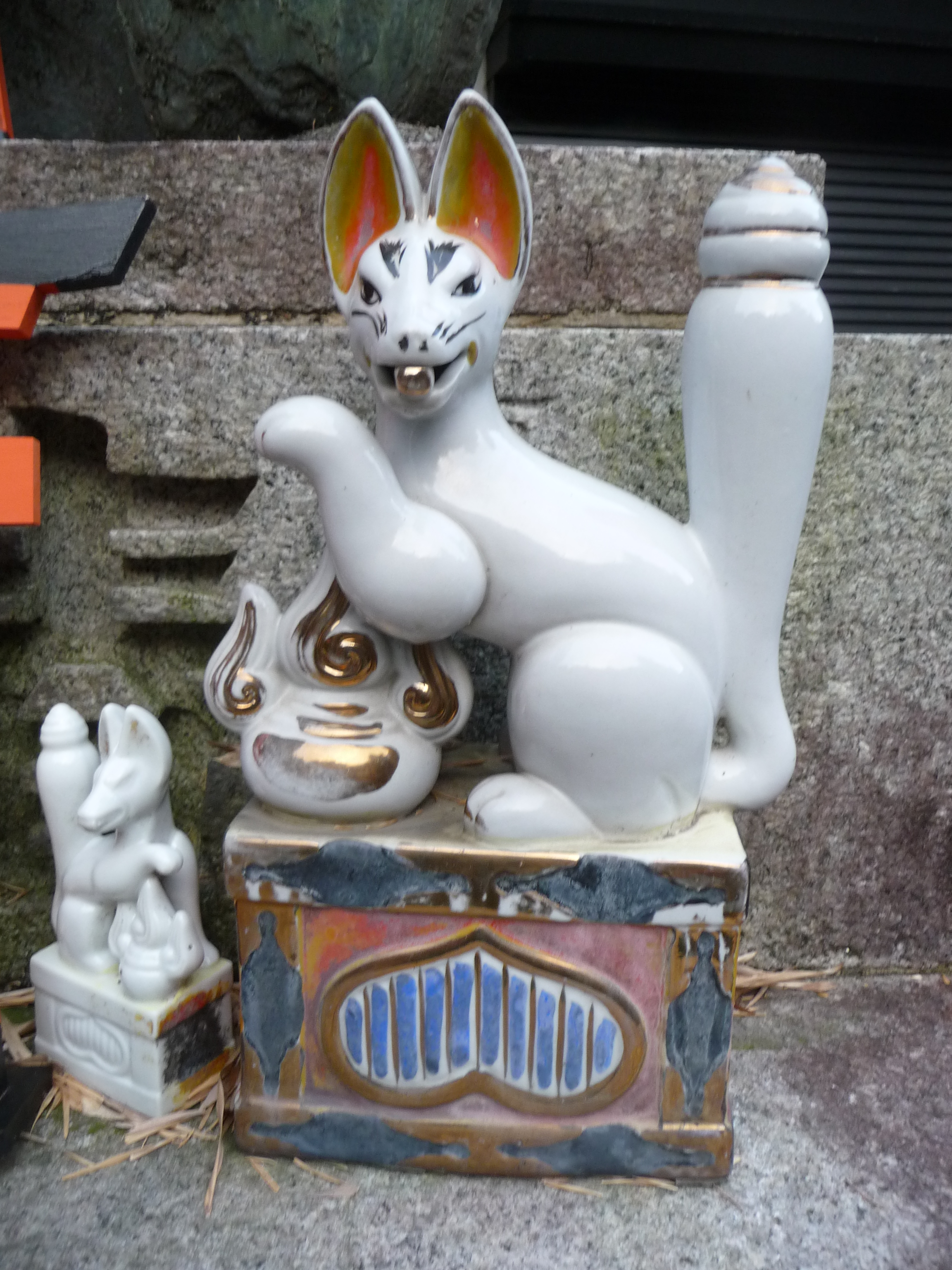
A figurine of a myōbu with the wish-fulfilling jewel placed on the tip of the fox's tail. A ball of fire is seen underneath the fox's raised paw.

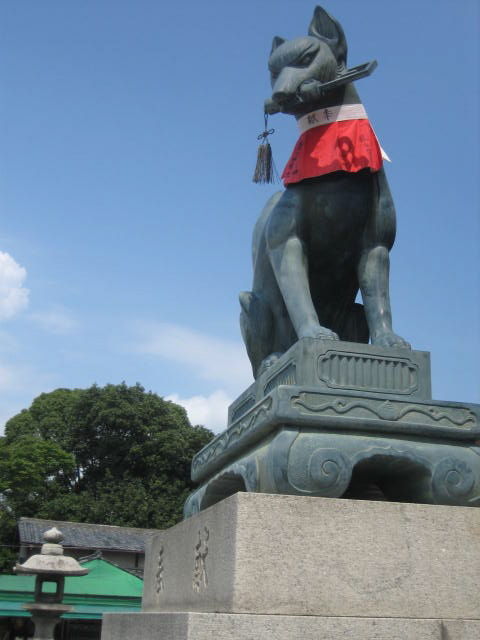
A statue of a myōbu wearing a red votive bib and holding a granary key at Fushimi Inari-taisha.

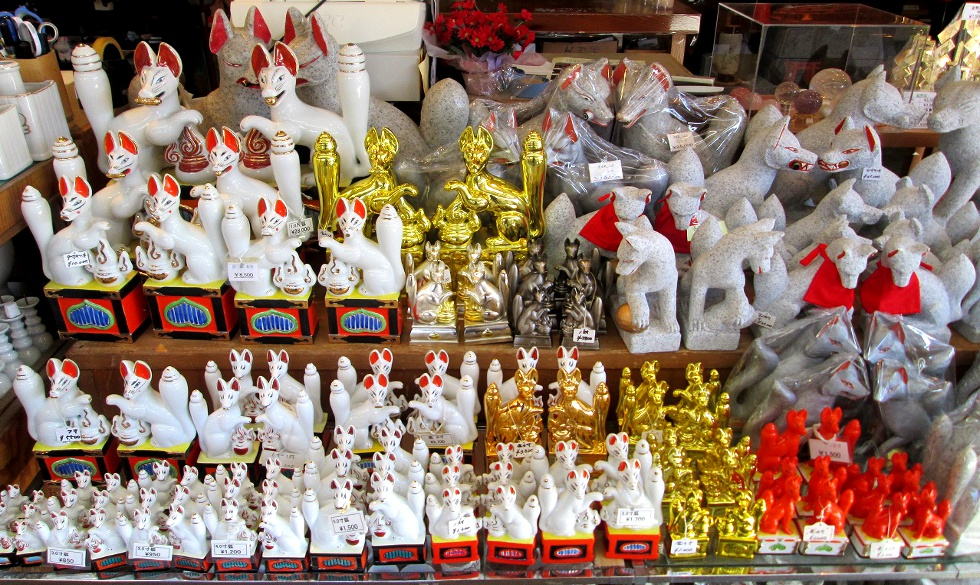
Examples of purchasable myōbu figurines.

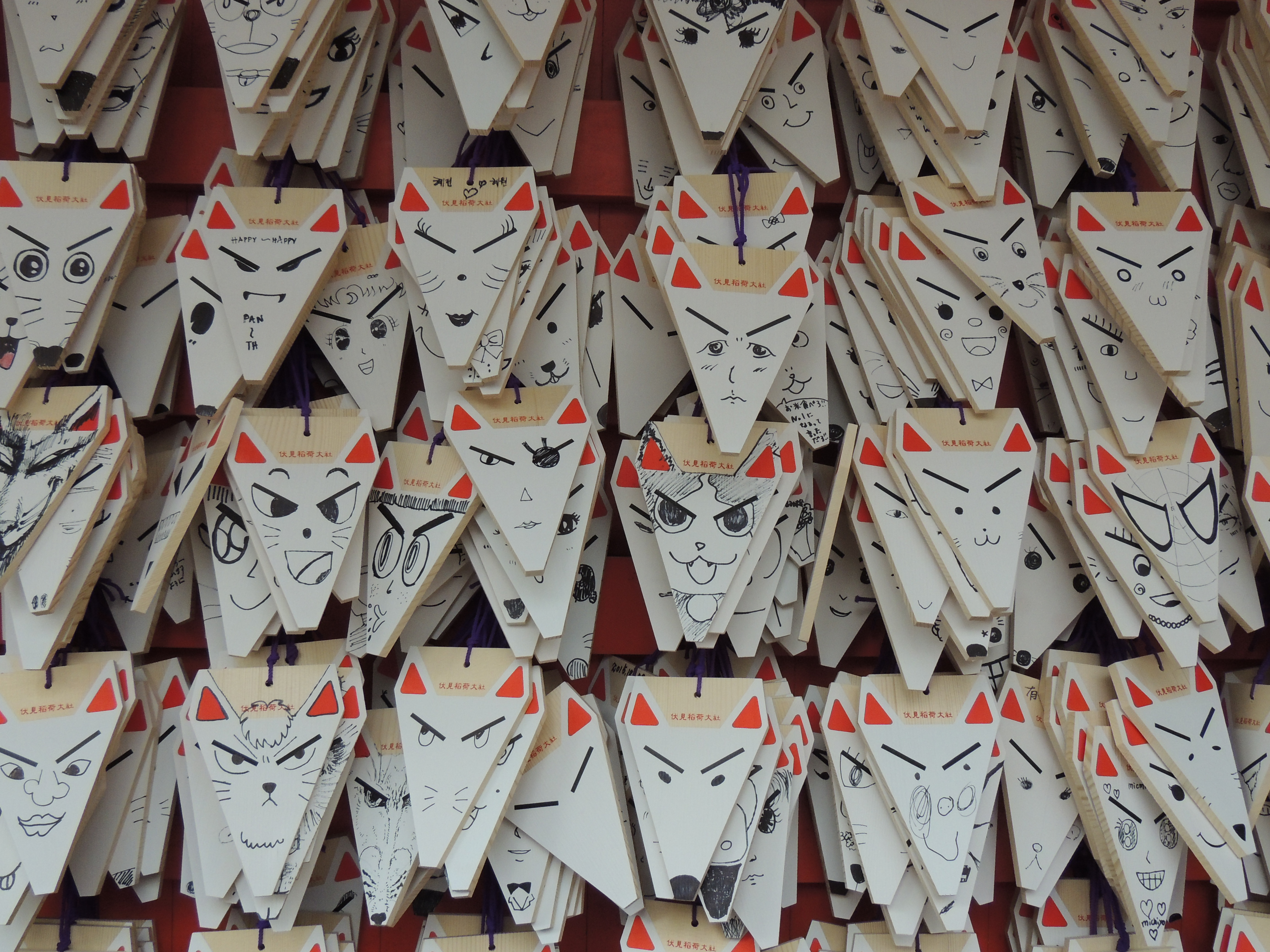
Myōbu-shaped ema at Fushimi Inari-taisha.

In Japan, myōbu (命婦) is a title which was given to ladies of the fifth rank in the imperial court or to midrank noblewomen. In The Pillow Book, Lady Myōbu was also the name of a pet cat belonging to Empress Consort Sadako, whom the author Sei Shōnagon served.

The term myōbu is also used to describe the fox messengers of Inari Ōkami and the subshrines in which they are worshipped. Japanese folklore contains several stories that suggest explanations for the connection, mainly involving Fushimi Inari-taisha on Mount Inari near Kyoto. On this mountain are a vast number of shrines, most of which are devoted to Inari, but some are also devoted to other deities, including a fox deity named Myōbu. Fushimi Inari-taisha itself contains a number smaller shrines dedicated to foxes, including the Byakko-sha ("white fox shrine") and the Myōbu-sha ("court lady shrine"). The fox messengers of Inari Ōkami are also called byakko (白狐).

== History ==
The reason why myōbu are associated with Inari Ōkami is unknown, but there are many theories regarding the origin of myōbu as the messengers of Inari Ōkami. One common explanation is that foxes were originally associated with the older kami of rice fields, Ta-no-Kami. The association between foxes and Ta-no-Kami may have been caused by the appearance of the red fox, as the fur of a red fox was said to have a similar color to that of ripe rice and their tails reminiscent of rice sheaths. Their behavior may have also influenced this association, as red foxes were known to wander rice paddies at dusk and night. Because foxes were said to be the messengers of Ta-no-Kami, it was only natural for foxes to be associated with the later Inari Ōkami. Myōbu may also have Buddhist origins, as Japanese images of Dakini-ten often depict women riding white foxes. In addition, the association between myōbu and Inari Ōkami may have been influenced by wordplays. Specifically, an older food deity called Miketsu-no-Kami may have been associated with foxes as the Japanese word for "fox", kitsune, is pronounced as ketsune in some dialects. As such, miketsu could have been understood as meaning "three foxes." Miketsu-no-Kami was eventually associated with Inari Ōkami, and, therefore, foxes also became the messengers of Inari Ōkami.

There are many explanations for why the term myōbu was used to refer to the messenger foxes of Inari Ōkami. A 1969 document published by Fushimi Inari-taisha gave two explanations. First, in 1071 Emperor Go-Sanjō travelled to Fushimi Inari-taisha and bestowed the rank upon either a fox or a section of the shrine. Some retellings of this tale claim that Emperor Go-Sanjō gave this title to an old fox who lived in a shrine dedicated to a female deity, and as such, the feminine title of myōbu was given to the fox. The second explanation describes how in the 10th century, a noblewoman named Shin no Myōbu secluded herself in Fushimi Inari-taisha for seventy days. During her seclusion, one of the messenger foxes of Inari Ōkami, named Akomachi, aided in her protection and future success in becoming the consort of the Mikado, resulting in Shin no Myōbu gratefully bestowing the title upon the fox. Another legend states that a lady of the imperial court who followed the Inari faith would frequently make pilgrimages to Fushimi Inari-taisha. As she grew older she became unable to climb to the highest peak of Mount Inari, and so she asked a tamed fox to make the pilgrimage to the third peak for her, promising to bestow her title upon the fox if it did so. The fox made the pilgrimage every day, and so received her title. Myōbu is also used in a 17th-century chapter heading of the Inari Daimyōjin Ryūki to refer to Inari Ōkami's fox messengers.

Myōbu are still popular in modern Japan. Myōbu often act as mascots for Inari shrines, and as such, Inari shrines are often identified on maps by the image of a fox. The shrines themselves sell many myōbu-themed goods and souvenirs, including figurines, coin purses, keychains, and ema. Some devotees of Inari Ōkami have even claimed to have seen or have been helped by myōbu.

== Characteristics ==
As the fox messengers of Inari Ōkami, myōbu are often depicted with white or light colored fur. However, the foxes are usually invisible. Statues of myōbu often come in pairs of a male and a female, with one holding a wish-fulfilling jewel and the other holding a key, scroll, bundle of rice, or a fox cub. The statues often wear red votive bibs (yodarekake) which are placed on the statues by worshipers. Some statues also wear necklaces of magatama.

They are known to like fried tofu (oage), and worshippers often offer meals of it to the statues. There are many explanations for why myōbu are believed to enjoy tofu. Some have offered that they are associated because both tofu and myōbu are usually white, while others have suggested that it was seen as a decent gift for a messenger of the gods because fried tofu used to be difficult to make.

== Abilities ==
Myōbu, and specifically statues and artistic images of them, have many abilities that are used to aid humans. For example, in the tale of the noblewoman Shin no Myōbu, Akomachi, one of the messenger foxes of Inari Ōkami, protected the woman and granted her romantic success. The foxes are also said to cure or prevent illness. Fox-holes, which are placed a few feet above the ground, are often present in Inari shrines. These holes, which are usually circular and lead into the shrine, can be opened with a small sliding door. Tofu is placed in the hole as an offering to the myōbu in hopes that the foxes will cure or prevent a disease.

Images and sculptures of myōbu are also said to have healing and wish-granting powers. If a devotee has a certain wish in mind, a pair of myōbu figurines can be purchased from shrines and taken home to be worshipped until the wish is fulfilled, in which case the statues are returned. If one wishes to enter a good marriage or career, a similar practice is performed in which three myōbu figurines are purchased and worshipped. Other myōbu-themed objects, such as amulets that promote good marriages, bells, and small statues, can be purchased from shrines. Rubbing statues of myōbu is also said to heal illness. For example, if someone is suffering a leg illness, rubbing the leg of a myōbu statue is said to heal it.

Even in contemporary Japan, some devotees still claim to have seen myōbu, with some stating that the foxes saved them from disaster or have helped in healing.

== See also ==
- Dakini
- Fushimi Inari-taisha
- Inari Ōkami
- Mingfu
- Kitsune
- Naemyeongbu
- Yako (fox)
- Yoshitsune Senbon Zakura
