= Mingfu =

Chinese noble title for women

Mingfu (simplified Chinese: 命妇; traditional Chinese: 命婦; pinyin: mìngfù; lit. "noblewoman", "court lady") was a title granted to wives of officials, non-imperial aristocrats, and collateral clanswomen. Mothers and sisters of imperial consorts were also granted a title of mingfu according to the rank held by their daughters or sisters. A title was granted to nursemaids of emperors and attendants of imperial consorts.

Noblewomen were divided into 7 ranks according to the rank of her husband and her daughter, if her daughter was an imperial consort. If the title held by mingfus' husbands was divided into subclasses, they could be treated equally.

== Rules of promotion ==
Married lady held title according to the position of her husband and could be promoted if her family members or children became officials or were awarded aristocratic title.

Wives of 8th and 9th rank officials could be granted a title of mingfu.

Mingfu retained her title even after divorce if her sister or daughter was imperial consort.

During the Qing dynasty, wives and mothers of dukes and aristocrats who received pre-standard titles could be addressed as "fujin" - a title typical for imperial princess consort . For example, mother of Fuk'anggan, lady Nara was mentioned and addressed as "fujin", as a mother of Prince Jiayong of the Second Rank (嘉勇郡王). Fukang'an's wife, lady Irgen Gioro was also addressed as "fujin". Their names were not listed in Jade Tables (imperial genealogy). Wives of non-imperial aristocrates were treated as imperial duchesses, but de facto they enjoyed lesser privileges.

== Notable titles and classification ==
Mingfus were divided into "inner court ladies" and "outer court ladies." Inner court ladies were close friends and servants of imperial consorts, ex. Sumalagu, a confidant of Empress Dowager Xiaozhuang. Female servants of imperial consorts received a title of mingfu according to the rank of imperial consort whom their served . Sometimes they could be addressed as "gege" (a title exclusively reserved for imperial princesses). Inner mingfus holding rank equivalent to wives of imperial generals conducted promotions of imperial ceremonies, weddings of imperial princes and princesses and several rites, while lower ranked ladies attended to them.

Court ladies were subdivided into "Qianqing palace ladies" and "Cining palace ladies" according to the position of their masters. Qianqing palace ladies were attendants to the emperor and his consorts. The following titles were granted to Qianqing palace ladies:

- Madam Shuyi (淑义夫人；Virtuous) equivalent to 2nd rank mingfu, granted to one court lady
- Madam Wanshi (婉侍夫人; Tactible and Patient), equivalent to 3 rank mingfu, granted to six court ladies
- Madam Rouwan (柔婉夫人; Conciliatory and Tactible), equivalent to 4 rank mingfu, granted to 30 court ladies
- Madam Fangwan (方婉夫人; Direct and Tactible), equivalent to 4 rank mingfu, granted to 30 court ladies

Cining palace ladies were attendants to the grand empress dowager, empress dowager and consort dowagers. The following titles were granted to Cining palace ladies:

- Madam Zhenrong (贞容夫人; Chaste and Tolerant), equivalent to 2 rank mingfu, granted to one court lady
- Madam Shenrong (慎容夫人; Prudent and Tolerant), equivalent to 3 rd rank mingfu, granted to two court ladies

Outer court ladies were mothers and unmarried into ruling clan sisters of imperial consorts, nursemaids of emperors and collateral clanswomen. Sisters of imperial consorts, who weren't members of imperial family (primary consorts or imperial consorts) were given a title of mingfu and receive a title according to the position of their husbands.

=== Notable titles ===
The following titles were granted to court ladies:

- Madam of Gaoming (诰命夫人), granted to attendants of imperial princesses (公主), mothers of imperial consorts and their female clan members if anyone of them was holding a title of princess consort or imperial consort. The rank of Madam of Gaoming was determined by the rank of her spouse. Madams of Gaoming could be further promoted along the promotions of her family member being an imperial consort. However, only 1st and 2nd rank Madams of Gaoming were styled as furen (夫人), while 3 rank ladies were styled as shuren (淑人), 4 rank ladies were entitled gongren (恭人), 5 rank ladies were entitled yiren (宜人), 6 rank ladies were entitled anren and 7 rank ladies were styled as ruren (孺人)
- Madam Gioro (觉罗夫人) was granted to collateral clanswomen who didn't marry into Aisin Gioro clan. Collateral Gioro clanswomen were treated like commoner ladies. However, collateral ladies whose husbands held chaopin ranks were treated as court ladies of 1-3rd rank.
- Madam Fu Zhongyong (傅忠勇夫人), granted to lady Nara Tang'er, Fuheng's wife and Mingju's descendant. Duchess Nara was promoted to "fujin" by Qianlong Emperor personally as the mother of Fuk'anggan, Prince Jiayong of the Second Rank (pre-standard title created for Fukang'an for his merits during Sino-Nepalese War).
- Madam Zuosheng (佐圣夫人), granted to Lady Yeheili
- Madam Yousheng (佑圣夫人), granted to Lady Ligiya, wife of Manduli, a nursemaid of Shunzhi Emperor.
- Madam Baosheng (宝圣夫人), granted to Lady Gūwalgiya, wife of Tukeshan and nursemaid of Kangxi Emperor, personally by Empress Dowager Xiaozhuang.
- Madam Fengsheng (奉圣夫人), granted to Lady Buri, wife of Plain Yellow Banner Master Commandant of Light Chariot Sakda Basali and nursemaid of Shunzhi Emperor and his son. The title was equivalent to duchess.
- Madam Shunshan (顺善夫人), granted to Lady Wang, Yongzheng Emperor's nursemaid.
- Madam Gongqin (恭勤夫人), granted to Lady Xie, another Yongzheng Emperor's nursemaid
- Madam Anqin (安勤夫人), granted to Lady Liu, third nursemaid of Yongzheng Emperor
- Madam Wenshu (温淑夫人), granted to Lady Dong, Qianlong Emperor's nursemaid.

== Court attire ==
Mingfus wore crowns with three bejewled plaques and finial consisting of one coral, silk bandeaus with embroidered golden dragons chasing after a flaming pearl and blue-grounded chaofu on solemn ceremonies. Mingfus could not wear surcoats with roundels of flowers and auspicious symbols and also golden diadems, unlike imperial duchesses and clanswomen. Collateral clanswomen could wear surcoats with rampant four-clawed dragons above the magnificent sea-waves pattern (lishui) and white caishui (pointed kerchief fastened to the robe like a pendant). Wives of officials wore sleeveless vest matching Mandarin square of her husband and Ming Dynasty style tiaras, as depicted on ancestral portraits.

== See also ==
- Myōbu
- Naemyeongbu
