= Prince Cheng =

Prince Cheng may refer to:

- Prince Cheng of the First Rank
- Prince Cheng of the Second Rank
