= Capture of Chusan (1841) =

Coordinates: 30°0′24″N 122°6′24″E

Second Capture of Chusan
- Part of the First Opium War
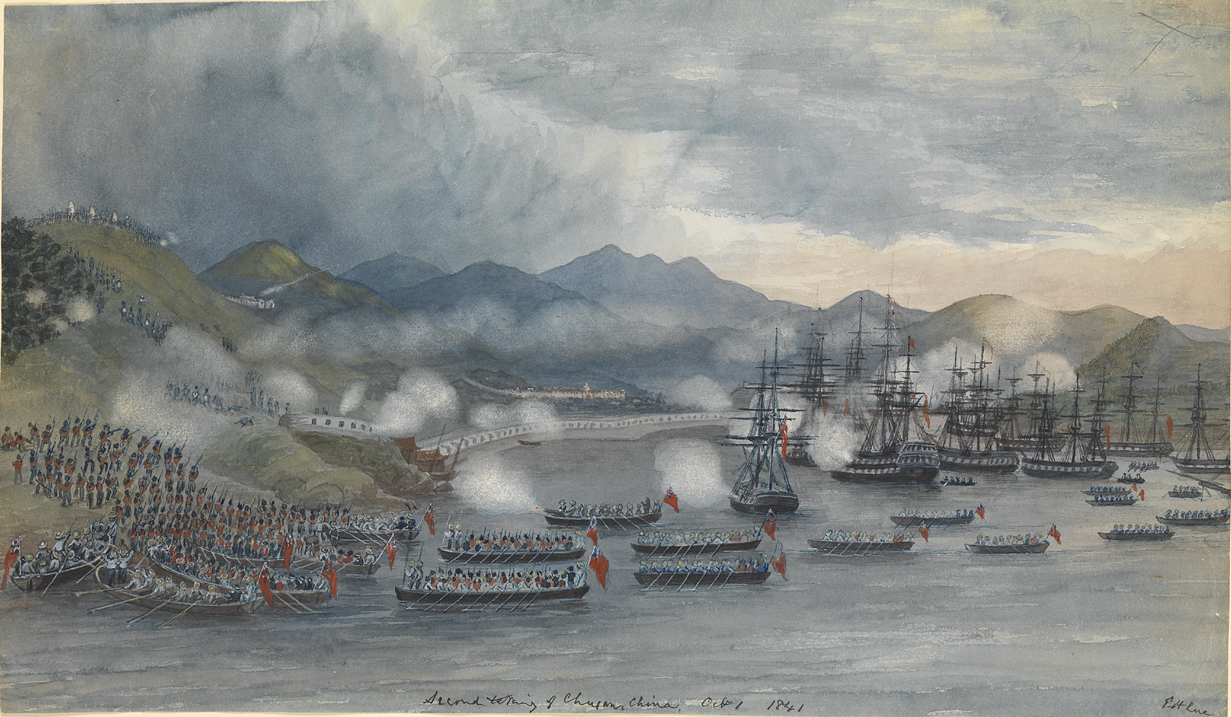
- Second taking of Chusan
Date	29 September – 1 October 1841
Location	Zhoushan, Zhejiang, China
Result	British victory

Belligerents
United Kingdom: British East India Company	Qing China

Commanders and leaders
Hugh Gough; William Parker	Ge Yunfei †

Strength
13 ships 2,607 troops	Unknown

Casualties and losses
2 killed 27 wounded	1,500 casualties 136 guns captured

The second capture of Chusan (Chinese: 第二次定海之戰) occurred on 1 October 1841 during the First Opium War when British forces captured the city of Dinghai, capital of the Chusan (Zhoushan) islands off the east Chinese coast.

The fortified city of Dinghai, with a population of 30,000, was defended by the Chinese under the command of Keo. After a brief one-sided seaborne operation involving the 55th Foot, the city fell to the far superior British forces which captured 100 iron guns, 36 brass cannon, and 540 gingalls (heavy muskets or light guns mounted on swivels) for the loss of 2 British killed and 28 wounded.

== Gallery ==
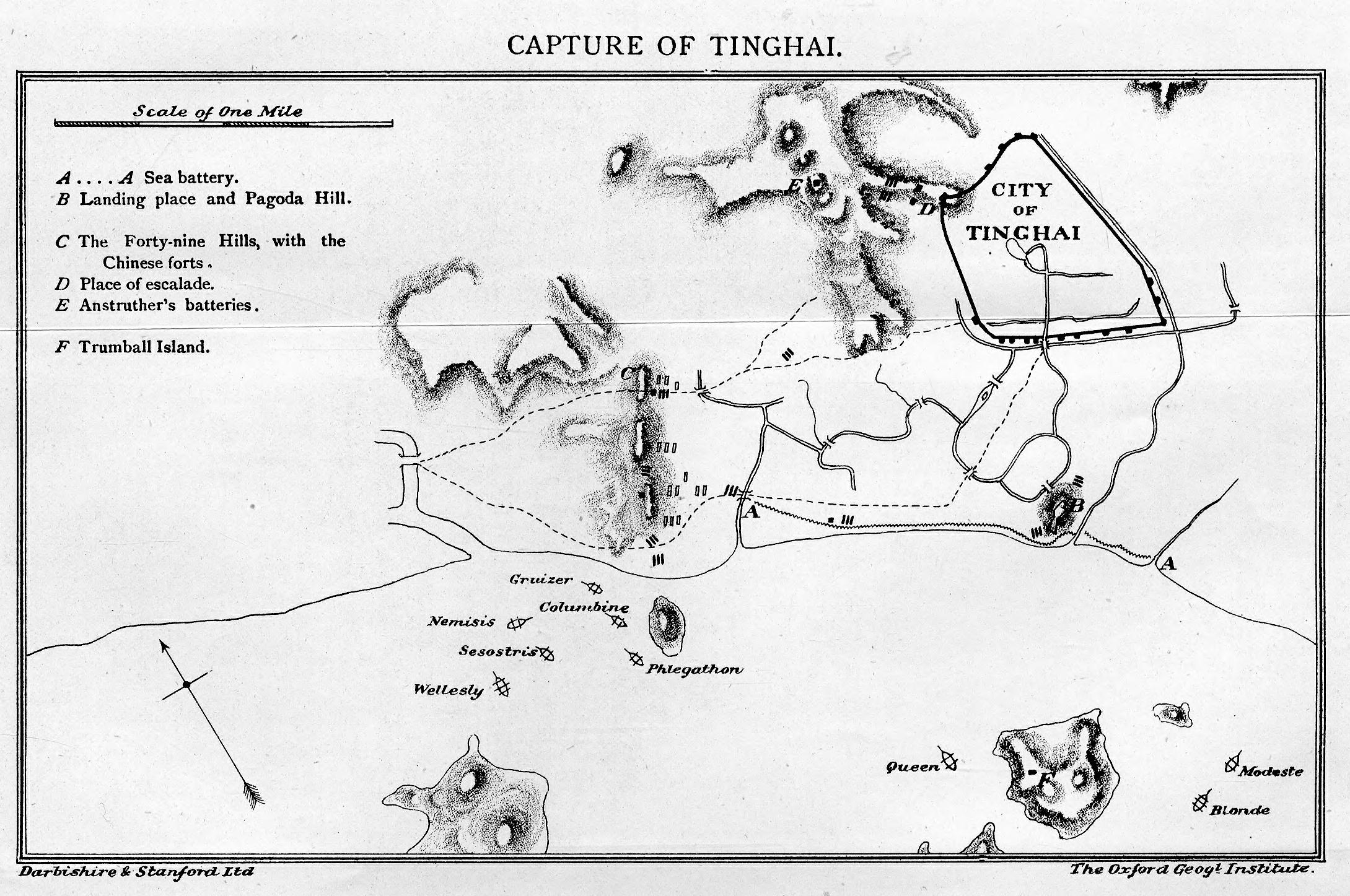
Map of the capture

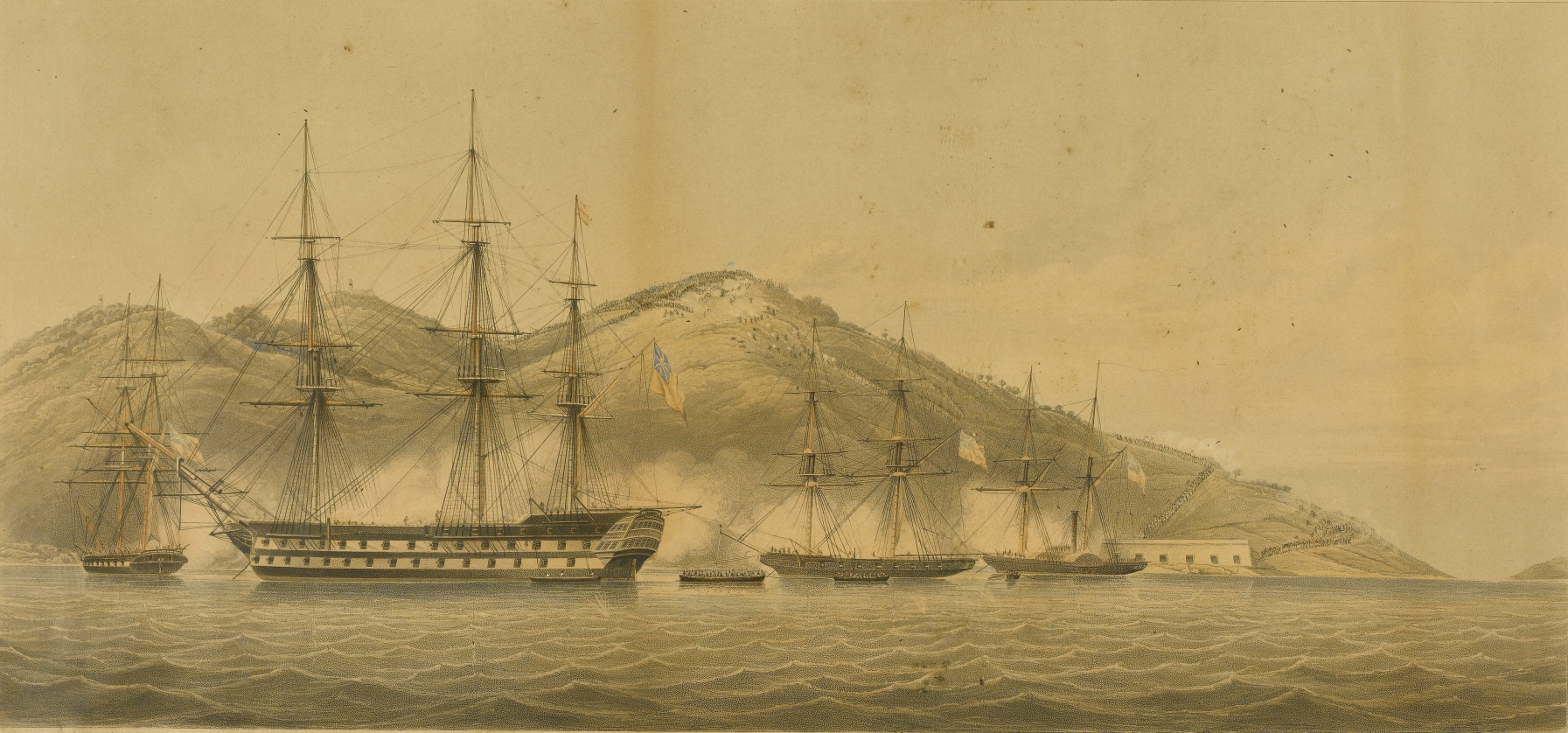
Attack on the heights of Chusan
