= Liugiya Duanyun =

- Secondary princess consort Chengzhe of the First Rank
- Spouse: Yongxing
- Issue: Miancong; Princess of the Fourth Rank; Princess of the Fourth Rank

Lady Liugiya (侧福晋刘佳氏) was a secondary consort of Yongxing, Qianlong Emperor's eleventh son. Her personal name was Duanyun (端云, literally: Floating Cloud).

== Life ==
Her family background is not known, but her family belonged to the Bordered White Banner. She entered the residence of eleventh prince as a servant. On 4 March 1770, Duanyun birthed the second daughter, later granted a title of the Princess of the Fourth Rank (县主). On 6 February 1775, Lady Liugiya gave birth to Miancong (绵聪), Yongxing's third son. In December 1775, she gave birth to the fourth daughter, later granted a title of the Lady of the First Rank and promoted to the Princess of the Fourth Rank(县主). Liugiya Duanyun was promoted to the position of secondary consort as a mother of Yongxing's three children. In January 1786, her eldest daughter married Dewei Dorji of the Aohan Borjigin clan. In 1795, her second daughter married Bozhechentian of the Manchu Nara clan.

== Issue ==
- Lesser bulwar duke Miancong (1775-1828), third son
- Princess of the Fourth Rank, second daughter
  - Married Dewei of the Aohan Borjigin clan in January 1786
- Princess of the Fourth Rank, fourth daughter
  - Married Bozhechentian of the Nara clan in 1795

== Titles ==
- Chosen servant (管女子)
- Secondary consort (侧福晋) - from 1775
