= Prince Lü =

Prince Lü of the First Rank

Chinese name
- Traditional Chinese: 和碩履親王
- Simplified Chinese: 和硕履亲王
Transcriptions
Standard Mandarin
- Hanyu Pinyin: héshuò lǚ qīnwáng
- Wade–Giles: ho-shuo lü ch'in-wang

Manchu name
- Manchu script: ᡥᠣᡧᠣᡳ ᡩᠣᡵᠣᠯᠣᠨ ᠴᡳᠨ ᠸᠠᠩ
- Romanization: hošoi dorolon cin wang

Prince Lü of the First Rank, or simply Prince Lü, was the title of a princely peerage used in China during the Manchu-led Qing dynasty (1644–1912). As the Prince Lü peerage was not awarded "iron-cap" status, this meant that each successive bearer of the title would normally start off with a title downgraded by one rank vis-à-vis that held by his predecessor. However, the title would generally not be downgraded to any lower than a feng'en fuguo gong except under special circumstances.

The first bearer of the title was Yuntao (1686–1763), the 12th son of the Kangxi Emperor. In 1722, Yuntao was made a junwang (second-rank prince) by his father for his military achievements. However, a year later, he was demoted two grades to beizi, but was restored as a junwang in 1730. In 1735, he was promoted to qinwang (first-rank prince) under the title "Prince Lü of the First Rank". The peerage was passed down over eight generations and held by eight persons.

== Members of the Prince Lü peerage ==
- Yuntao (允祹; 1686 – 1763) (1st), the Kangxi Emperor's 12th son, initially a beizi, promoted to second-rank prince in 1722, demoted to beizi in 1723, further demoted to grace defender duke in 1724, restored as a second-rank prince in 1730, promoted to first-rank prince as Prince Lü of the First Rank in 1735, posthumously honoured as Prince Lü Yi of the First Rank (履懿親王)
  - (N/A)
    - Yongcheng (永珹; 1739 – 1777) (2nd), the Qianlong Emperor's fourth son and Yuntao's adoptive grandson, held the title Prince Lü of the Second Rank from 1763 to 1777, posthumously honoured as Prince Lü Duan of the First Rank (履端親王) in 1799
      - Mianhui (綿惠; 1764 – 1796) (3rd), Yongcheng's eldest son, held the title of a beile from 1777 to 1796, posthumously honoured as Prince Lü of the Second Rank
        - Yilun (奕綸; 1790 – 1836) (4th), Mianqin's son and Mianhui's adoptive son (from line of Prince Cheng's peerage), held the title of a beizi from 1796 to 1809, promoted to beile in 1809, demoted to beizi in 1835, posthumously honoured as a beile in 1836
          - Zaigang (載鋼; 1823 – 1882), Yilun's ninth son, held the title of a feng'en zhenguo gong from 1865 to 1882
            - Pumao (溥楙; 1850–1882) (6th), Zaigang's third son and Zaifen's adoptive son, held the title of a grace bulwark duke from 1854 to 1882
              - Yuchang (毓昌; 1878 – 1885) (7th), Pumao's eldest son, held the title of a grace defender duke from 1882 to 1885, had no male heir
          - Zaifen (載鈖; 1825 – 1853) (5th), Yilun's tenth son, held the title of a beizi from 1836 to 1853, had no male heir
          - Zaihe (載鶴; 1833 – 1884), Yilun's 12th son, held the title of a grace general from 1856 to 1884
            - Puzhi (溥植; 1882 – 1936) (8th), Zaihe's eldest son, held the title of a grace defender duke from 1885 to 1936
              - Yujun (毓鈞; b. 1902), Puzhi's son
                - Hengpei (恆培; b. 1928), Yujun's son

=== Cadet line ===
==== Yuntao's cadet line ====
- Hongkun (弘昆; 1739 – 1750), Yuntao's fifth son, posthumously honoured as the hereditary prince of Prince Lü of the First Rank in 1750

==== Yilun's cadet line ====
- Zaiwu (載鋙), Yilun's sixth son, held the title of a first class bulwark general from 1838 to 1847
  - Pusen (溥森), Zaiwu's eldest son, held the title of a supporter general from 1847 to 1881
    - Yucun (毓存), Pusen's fourth son, held the title of a grace general in 1881, had no male heir
- Zaigang (載鋼; 1823 – 1882), Yilun's ninth son, held the title of a feng'en zhenguo gong from 1865 to 1882
- Zaihe (載鶴; 1833 – 1884), Yilun's 12th son, held the title of a grace general from 1856 to 1884
- Zai'ai (載藹), Yilun's 13th son, held the title of a grace general from 1856 to 1901
  - Puquan (溥泉), Zai'ai's eldest son, held the title of a grace general from 1902

== Family tree ==
adoption
Yinzhen 胤禛 (1678–1735); Yongzheng Emperor 雍正帝 (1722–1735)	Yuntao 允祹 (1686–1763); Prince Lüyi 履懿親王 (1735–1763)
Hongli 弘曆 (1711–1799); Qianlong Emperor 乾隆帝 (1735–1796)	Hongkun 弘昆 (1739–1750); Shizi 世子 (posthumously awarded)
Yongcheng 永珹 (1739–1777); Prince Lüduan 履端親王 (1763–1777)	Yongxing 永瑆 (1752–1823); Prince Chengzhe 成哲親王 (1789–1823)
Mianhui 綿惠 (1764–1796); Prince Lü (of the Second Rank) 履郡王 (1777–1796) (posthumously awarded)	Mianqin 綿懃 (1768–1820); Prince Cheng (of the Second Rank) 成郡王 (posthumously awarded)
Yilun 奕綸 (1790–1836); Beile 貝勒 (1796–1836) (posthumously awarded)
Zaigang 載鋼 (1823–1882); Feng'en Zhenguo Gong 奉恩鎮國公 (1865–1882)	Zaifen 載鈖 (1825–1853); Beizi 貝子 (1836–1853)	Zaihe 載鶴 (1833–1884); Feng'en Jiangjun 奉恩將軍 (1856–1884)
Pumao 溥楙 (1850–1882); Feng'en Zhenguo Gong 奉恩鎮國公 (1854–1882)	Puzhi 溥植 (1882–1936); Feng'en Zhenguo Gong 奉恩鎮國公 (1885–1936)
Yuchang 毓昌 (1878–1885); Feng'en Zhenguo Gong 奉恩鎮國公 (1882–1885)	Yujun 毓鈞 (1902–?)
Hengpei 恆培 (1928–?)

== See also ==
- Royal and noble ranks of the Qing dynasty
