= Mianhui =

- Prince Lü of the Third Rank 履貝勒

Head of the House of Prince Lü peerage
- Tenure: 5 April 1777 - 6 September 1796
- Predecessor: Yongcheng
- Successor: Yilun
- Born: 20 October 1764
- Died: 6 September 1796 (aged 31)
- Spouse: Lady Borjigin
- Father: Yongcheng
- Mother: Lady Wanyan

Mianhui (Chinese: 綿惠; 20 October 1764 - 6 September 1796) was Qing dynasty imperial prince and Qianlong Emperor's grandson.

== Life ==
Mianhui was born on 20 October 1764 as the eldest son of Yongcheng and lady Wanyan, later promoted to secondary princess consort. Mianhui was the only surviving son, hence sole heir to the Prince Lü peerage. In 1775, he was present on the funeral of Empress Xiaoyichun. He inherited in 1777 as the prince of the third rank. In 1779, he was rewarded together with Mian'en with a yellow saddle for excelling in mount archery and horse riding, breaking the tradition of using purple and red saddles usually reserved for imperial clansmen. He died on 6 September 1796 and was posthumously honoured as Prince Lü of the Second Rank.

== Family ==
Mianhui's primary consort was lady Borjigit, niece of Deleke and Princess Hewan of the First Rank, a daughter of Hongzhou, Prince He of the First Rank. Mianhui did not have a male heir because his only son died in infancy. He adopted Mianqin's son Yilun into a peerage.

- Primary consort, of the Barin Borjigin clan, daughter of Batu.
  - Yiwen, first son
- Mistress, of the Zhao clan, daughter of Zhao Sheng

== Ancestry ==
Yongzheng Emperor
Qianlong Emperor
Empress Xiaoshengxian
Yongcheng
Jingiya Sanbao
Imperial Noble Consort Shujia
Mianhui
Gongyi
Lady Wanyan
