= Yongxing (prince) =

Qing dynasty prince (1752–1823)

- Prince Cheng of the First Rank (和碩成親王)

Prince Cheng of the First Rank
- Tenure: November 1789 – 10 May 1823
- Predecessor: peerage created
- Successor: Zairui

Chief Councillor
- In office: 12 February 1799 – 19 November 1799
- Predecessor: Heshen
- Successor: Qinggui
- Born: 22 March 1752
- Died: 10 May 1823 (aged 71)
- Spouse: Lady Fuca (富察氏)
- Issue: Mianqin; Mianyi; Miancong (綿聰); Miansi (綿偲); Mianke (綿恪); Mianbin
Names
- Aisin Gioro Yongxing (愛新覺羅·永瑆)
Posthumous name
- Prince Chengzhe of the First Rank (和碩成哲親王)
- House: Aisin Gioro
- Father: Qianlong Emperor
- Mother: Imperial Noble Consort Shujia

Yongxing (Chinese: 永瑆; 22 March 1752 – 10 May 1823), art names Shaohan (少厂), Jingquan (鏡泉) and Yijinzhai Zhuren (詒晉齋主人), posthumous name Prince Chengzhe of the First Rank, was an imperial prince of the Qing dynasty of China. He was the Qianlong Emperor's 11th son.

== Biography ==
Yongxing was born on 22 March 1752 to Imperial Noble Consort Shujia, a member of Korean Jin clan. Yongxing was considered to be one of the most talented sons of the Qianlong Emperor. He had good relationship with 12th prince Yongji and 15th prince Yongyan in his childhood. He was known for his calligraphy, that's why he was commissioned by his half-brother to create plaques and stellas in the Yu Mausoleum of Eastern Qing tombs. His first work was "Lyrics of Peaceful Summer", dedicated to Empress Xiaoshengxian. Empress Dowager expressed her fondness of that work by creating a library named Yijingzhai, after that Yongxing chose his art name. The prince later wrote cycle of poems named after his studio. Furthermore, his literary works included "Listening to the Rain" and "Series of Ancient Dragon". Yongxing was particularly famous for relationship with top artisans of Qianlong era, such as Weng Fanggang, Liu Yong and Tiebao (member of Donggo clan), which earned a name of "Four Schools of Qianlong era".

He was granted the title Prince Cheng of the First Rank in 1789. In 1792, Minister of War Qinggui used Yongyan's letter to Yongxing in the entry of his memorial. Qinggui was accused of disrespect and punished for his action. In 1799, Yongxing was appointed as a member of Council of State and subsequently tasked with overseeing Ministry of Revenue. In 1813, when Eight Trigrams attempted to storm the Forbidden City, Yongxing supported his nephew in killing the uprisers. In 1819, he was dismissed of his duties due to offensive behaviour. In 1820, when Jiaqing Emperor became severely ill in Chengde Mountain Resort, he was summoned back to Beijing. In 1822, he presented a set of 16 ritual vessels to the imperial court. Yongxing died on 10 May 1823 and was posthumously honoured as Prince Chengzhe of the First Rank (成哲亲王, meaning "virtuous and sagacious").

== Family ==
Yongxing was married to Fuheng's daughter, Lady Fuca. Later, he took his palace maid Duanyun as a secondary consort, following example of Yongxuan, who also took his servant as a concubine.

Princess consort spent monthly 817 taels of silver in 1795, more than Crown Princess, who spent only 290 taels of silver. In 1796, after the promotion of lady Hitara, spendings of Yongxing's consorts were lower than expenses of imperial court.

Primary Consort

- Primary consort, of the Fuca clan (嫡福晋 富察氏; d. 1813)
  - Mianqin, Prince Cheng of the Second Rank (16 October 1768 – 20 July 1820), first son
  - First daughter (13 January 1770 – 15 July 1771)
  - Mianyi, Prince of the Third Rank (27 October 1771 – 26 February 1809), second son adopted by Yongzhang
  - Third daughter (13 August 1775 – 22 August 1783)

Secondary Consort

- Secondary consort, of the Tatara clan (侧福晋 他他拉氏)
  - Sixth daughter (13 November 1793 – 16 May 1794)
  - Mianbin, Defender general (22 October 1796 – 7 February 1841), seventh son
- Duanyun, secondary consort of the Liugiya clan (侧福晋 刘佳氏 端云)
  - Princess of the Fourth Rank (9 March 1770 – 1 February 1800), second daughter
    - Married Dewei of the Aohan Borjigin clan in January 1786
  - Miancong, Lesser bulwar Duke (14 February 1775 – 2 April 1828), third son
  - Princess of the Fourth Rank (b. 15 January 1776), fourth daughter
    - Married Bozhechentian of the Nara clan
- Secondary consort, of the Ligiya clan (侧福晋 李佳氏)
  - Miansi, Prince of the Third Rank (17 April 1776 – 7 December 1848), fourth son adopted by Yongji
  - Mianke (10 July 1777 – 4 December 1777), fifth son

Concubine

- Mistress, of the Yi clan (使女 伊氏)
  - Lady of the Second Rank (b. 12 February 1783), fifth daughter
    - Married Linaxi of the Khorchin league
  - Sixth son (7 July 1785 – 29 August 1786)

== Art names ==
Personal name: Yongxing (永瑆)

First art name: Shaochan (少厂), literally "Little Cliff"

Second art name: Jingquan (竟泉), literally "Mirror-like water spring"

Third art name: Yijingzhai zhuren (诒竟斋主人), literally "Master of the Studio of Promulgating Ascension"
