= Prince Xun (循) =

Prince Xun of the Second Rank
- Traditional Chinese: 多羅循郡王
- Simplified Chinese: 多罗循郡王
Transcriptions
Standard Mandarin
- Hanyu Pinyin: duōluó xún jùnwáng
- Wade–Giles: to-lo hsün chün-wang

Prince Xun of the Second Rank, or simply Prince Xun, was the title of a princely peerage used in China during the Manchu-led Qing dynasty (1644–1912). As the Prince Xun peerage was not awarded "iron-cap" status, this meant that each successive bearer of the title would normally start off with a title downgraded by one rank vis-à-vis that held by his predecessor. However, the title would generally not be downgraded to any lower than a feng'en fuguo gong except under special circumstances.

The first bearer of the title was Yongzhang (永璋; 1735–1760), the Qianlong Emperor's third son. Yongzhang was posthumously honoured with the title "Prince Xun of the Second Rank" by his father in 1760. The title was passed down over six generations and held by six persons.

== Members of the Prince Xun peerage ==
Members of the Prince Xun peerage
- Yongzhang (永璋; 1735–1760), the Qianlong Emperor's third son, posthumously honoured with the title "Prince Xun of the Second Rank"
  - Mianyi (綿懿; 1771–1809), Yongxing's second son and Yongzhang's adopted son, inherited the Prince Xun peerage as a beile in 1787, demoted to second class zhenguo jiangjun in 1804, promoted to beizi in 1805, posthumously restored as a beile
    - Yixu (奕緒; 1791–1809), Mianyi's eldest son, held the title of a zhenguo jiangjun from 1799 to 1809, promoted to beizi in 1809
      - Zaiqian (載遷; 1849–1899), Yixu's second son, held the title of a feng'en zhenguo gong from 1858 to 1899
        - Pukui (溥葵; 1873–1926), Zaiqian's eldest son, held the title of a third class zhenguo jiangjun from 1898 to 1899, promoted to feng'en fuguo gong in 1899
        - Puquan (溥荃; 1878–?), Zaiqian's second son, held the title of a first class fuguo jiangjun from 1903
          - Yugui (毓桂; 1906–?), Puquan's eldest son
          - Yusen (毓槮; 1913–?), Puquan's second son and Pukui's adopted son, held the title of a feng'en fuguo gong from 1926
    - Yijing (奕經; 1791–1853), Mianyi's second son, held the title of a second class zhenguo jiangjun from 1816 to 1843, stripped of his title in 1843
    - Yiji (奕紀; 1797–1863), Mianyi's third son, initially a second class fuguo jiangjun, promoted to second class zhenguo jiangjun in 1832, stripped of his title in 1840
      - Zaixiao (載䥵; 1821–1872), Yiji's son
        - Pugu (溥顧; 1844–1902), Zaixiao's son
          - Yubin (毓邠; 1870–?), Pugu's son
      - Zaijian (載鏗; 1826–1871), Yiji's son
        - Pudui (溥㟋; 1848–1903), Zaijian's son
          - Yuping (毓平; 1881–?), Pudui's son
            - Hengyin (恆蔭; 1909–?), Yuping's son

== Family tree ==
Family of Prince Xun (循)

adoption
Hongli 弘曆 (1711–1799); Qianlong Emperor 乾隆帝 (1735–1796)
Yongzhang 永璋 (1735–1760); Prince Xun of the Second Rank 循郡王 (posthumously awarded)	Yongxing 永瑆 (1752–1823); Prince Chengzhe of the First Rank 成哲親王 (1789–1823)
Mianyi 綿懿 (1771–1809); Beile 貝勒 (posthumously awarded)
Yixu 奕緒 (1791–1809); Beizi 貝子 (1809)	Yijing 奕經 (1791–1853); Second Class Zhenguo Jiangjun 二等鎮國將軍 (1816–1843) (stripped of his title)	Yiji 奕紀 (1797–1863); Second Class Zhenguo Jiangjun 二等鎮國將軍 (1832–1840) (stripped of his title)
Zaiqian 載遷 (1849–1899); Feng'en Zhenguo Gong 奉恩鎮國公 (1858–1899)	Zaixiao 載䥵 (1821–1872)	Zaijian 載鏗 (1826–1871)
Pukui 溥葵 (1873–1926); Feng'en Fuguo Gong 奉恩輔國公 (1899–1926)	Puquan 溥荃 (1878–?)	Pugu 溥顧 (1844–1902)	Pudui 溥㟋 (1848–1903)
Yugui 毓桂 (1906–)	Yusen 毓槮 (1913–); Feng'en Fuguo Gong 奉恩輔國公 (1926–?)	Yubin 毓邠 (1870–?)	Yuping 毓平 (1881–?)
Hengyin 恆蔭 (1909–?)

== See also ==
- Prince Cheng (成)
- Royal and noble ranks of the Qing dynasty
