= Sumalagu =

Chinese lady-in-waiting

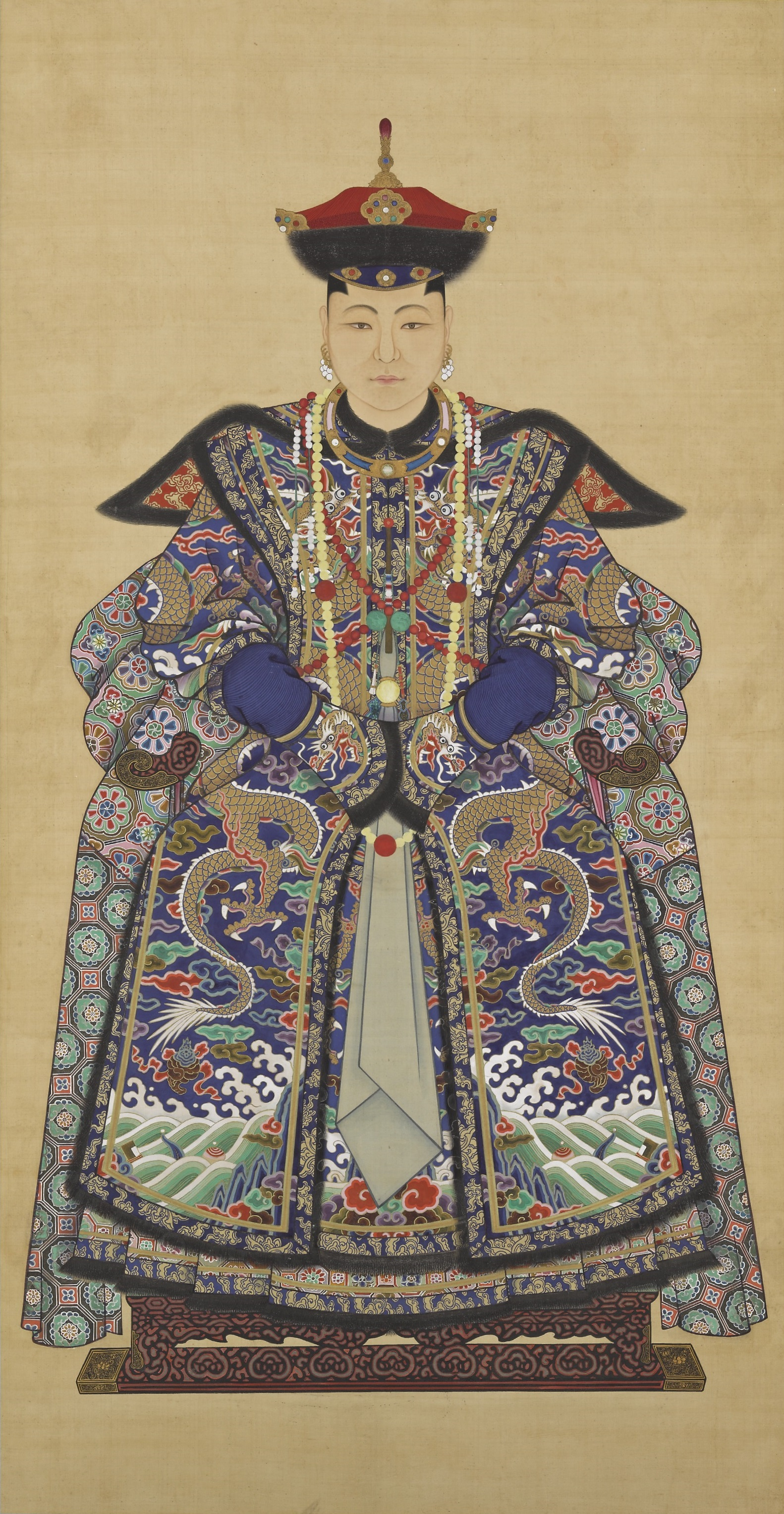
Sumalagu

Sumalagu (Chinese: 苏麻喇姑; pinyin: Sūmálàgū; originally Sumal, in Manchu Chinese: 苏麻喇; pinyin: Sumala; 1615 – 24 October 1705) was a palace attendant of the Qing dynasty. She was a close confidante of Empress Dowager Xiaozhuang during the reign of the Shunzhi Emperor.

Empress Dowager Xiaozhuang called her "Gege", a title reserved for only imperial princesses.

She acted as the messenger between prince Shizu and his mother during the reign of Dorgon.

Upon the wish of the empress dowager, she escorted empress Borjigit incognito to receive medical treatment by the Jesuit Adam Schall von Bell.

Sumalagu taught the young Kangxi Emperor the Manchu language while he was under her care. She was a supporter of the Kangxi Emperor when he asserted his power against the power base of Oboi in 1667–69.

In 1687, she was given the responsibility of looking after Yuntao, one of Kangxi's sons.
