= HMS Kite =

Seven ships of the Royal Navy have borne the name HMS Kite, after the kite, a bird of prey:

- HMS Kite (1764) was a 6-gun cutter launched in 1764 and sold in 1771.
- HMS Kite (1778) was a 12-gun cutter purchased in 1778, rated as a sloop between 1779 and 1783, and sold in 1793.
- HMS Kite (1795) was a 16-gun brig-sloop launched in 1795 and sold in 1805.
- HMS Kite (1805) was a 16-gun brig-sloop launched in 1805 and sold in 1815.
- HMS Kite (1826) was a wooden paddle vessel, previously the GPO ship Aetna. She was launched in 1826, transferred to the navy in 1837 and sold in 1864.
- HMS Kite (1871) was an iron Ant-class screw gunboat launched in 1871 and sold in 1920, becoming a dredger.
- HMS Kite (U87) was a Modified Black Swan-class sloop launched in 1942 and sunk by a German U-boat in 1944.

== See also ==
- HM hired armed ship Kite, a hired armed transport wrecked in the Yangtze in 1840.
