= Yongcheng (prince) =

Qing dynasty prince (1739–1777)

- Prince Lü of the First Rank 和碩履親王

Head of the House of Prince Lü peerage
- Tenure: 1763 – 5 April 1777
- Predecessor: Yuntao
- Successor: Mianhui
- Born: 21 February 1739; Bitong Academy, Old Summer Palace, Beijing
- Died: 5 April 1777 (aged 38)
- First primary consort: Lady Niohuru
Posthumous name
- Prince Lüduan of the First Rank (履端親王)
- Father: Qianlong Emperor
- Mother: Imperial Noble Consort Shujia

Yongcheng (Chinese: 永珹, 21 February 1739 – 5 April 1777) was an imperial prince of Qing Dynasty.

== Life ==
Yongcheng was born on 21 February 1739 as the Qianlong Emperor's fourth son. His mother, Imperial Noble Consort Shujia, was entitled "Concubine Jia" at that time. In 1763, Qianlong Emperor decided to adopt him into Prince Lü peerage as a grandson of Yuntao, Kangxi Emperor's 12th son because all the children of the prince Lüyi died prematurely. Yongcheng held the title Prince Lü of the Second Rank until his death on 5 April 1777. He was posthumously honoured as Prince Lü Duan of the First Rank (履端親王; meaning "implementing in a dignified way") in 1799.

== Family ==
Primary Consort

- Imperial Princess Consort Luduan, of the Niohuru clan (履端亲王福晋 钮祜禄氏; 1751-1754)
  Titles: Primary Consort of the Fourth Prince (皇四子嫡福晋), Primary Consort of Prince Lu of the Second Rank (履郡王福晋), Imperial Princess Consort Luduan (履端亲王福晋)
- Step Imperial Princess Consort Luduan, of the Irgen Gioro clan (履端亲继王福晋 伊尔根觉罗氏, since 1754)
  Titles: Step Primary Consort of the Fourth Prince (皇四子继福晋), Step Primary Consort of Prince Lu of the Second Rank (履继郡王福晋), Step Imperial Princess Consort Luduan (履端亲继王福晋)

Secondary Consort

- Secondary consort, of the Wanyan clan
  Titles: Secondary Consort of Prince Lu of the Second Rank (履郡王侧福晋), Secondary Consort of Prince Luduan of the First Rank (履端亲王侧福晋)
  - Mianhui, Prince Lu of the Second Rank (履郡王 绵惠; 20 October 1764 – 6 September 1796)
  - Second son (31 May 1766 – 30 November 1766)
  - Third son (10 October 1767 – 2 December 1769)
  - Princess of the Fourth Rank (县主; 9 October 1769 – 4 July 1787), second daughter
    - Married Wangqin Bambar of the Alxa Kalejiasi clan in 1785
  - Fourth son (22 June 1771 – June/July 1771)
  - Princess of the Fourth Rank (县主; b. 20 August 1776), third daughter
    - Married Namqijal Dorji of the Aohan league in 1791

Concubine

- Mistress, of the Gao clan
  - First daughter (28 July 1766 – 29 January 1767)
- Mistress, of the Xia clan
  - Fifth son
- Mistress, of the Zhang clan
  - Sixth son

== Family tree ==
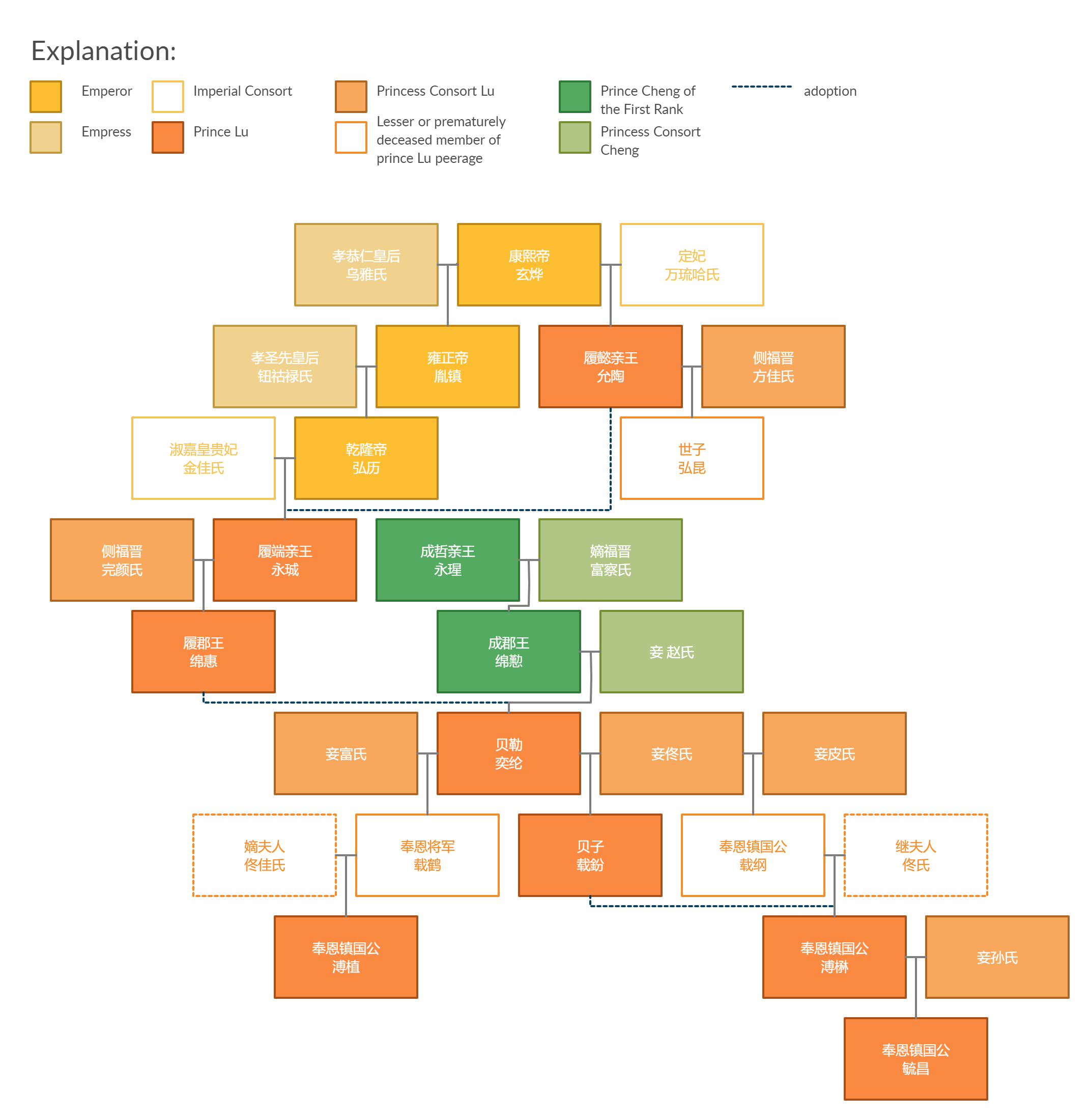
Family Tree of the Prince Lu peerage

== In popular culture ==
- Portrayed by Fang Yanfei in "Story of Yanxi Palace" as Fourth Prince Yongcheng
- Portrayed by An Jie in "Ruyi's Royal Love in the Palace" as Fourth Prince Yongcheng
