= Yuntao =

Qing dynasty imperial prince

- Prince Lü of the First Rank 和碩履親王
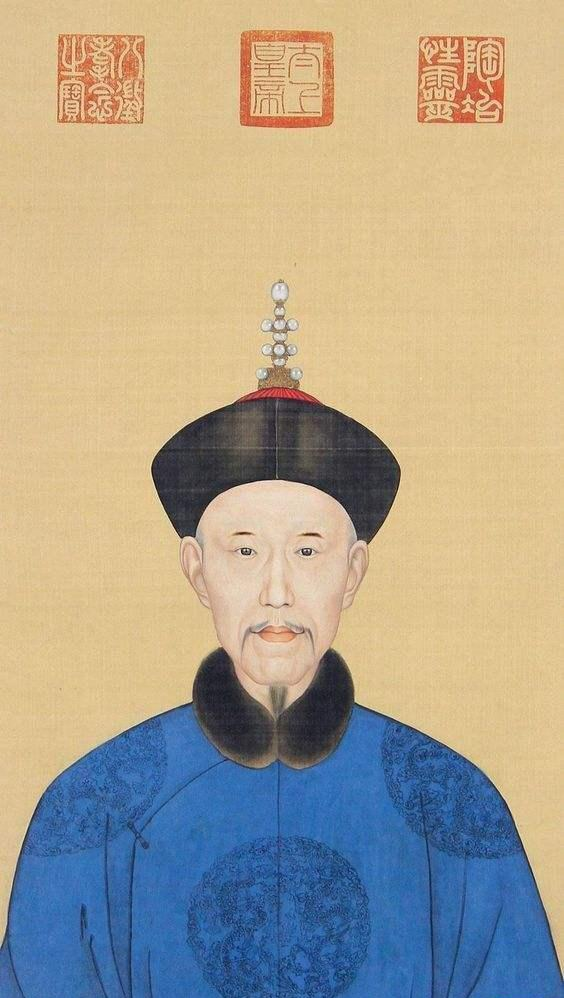
- Yuntao in daily dress

Prince Lü of the First Rank
- Tenure: 17 November 1735 – 1 September 1763
- Predecessor: peerage created
- Successor: Yongcheng
- Born: 18 January 1686
- Died: 1 September 1763 (aged 77)
- Spouse: Lady Fuca
- Issue: Princess of the Third Rank, Hongkun, Princess of the Third Rank, Lady of the Third Rank
Posthumous name
- Prince Lüyi of the First Rank (履懿親王)
- Father: Kangxi Emperor
- Mother: Consort Ding

Yuntao (Chinese: 允祹; 18 January 1686 - 1 September 1763) was a Qing dynasty imperial prince and the 12th son of the Kangxi Emperor. Yuntao was rather a crony of the Yongzheng Emperor and his adoptive brother, which helped him persist in the succession war. He became the first bearer of the Prince Lü of the First Rank title.

== Life ==
Yuntao was born on 18 January 1686 to Concubine Ding, Wanlioha Niuniu (完琉哈•妞妞). In his childhood, he was taught by Sumalagu, a confidant of Empress Dowager Xiaozhuang. In October 1695, Yuntao was awarded a yellow riding jacket for his excellence in martial arts Yunzhi once recalled that Yuntao addressed Sumalagu as Azhagu (阿扎姑，meaning "careful" in Manchu language). When Sumalagu fell critically ill in 1705, Yuntao personally took care of her. On 10 April 1709, Yuntao was granted a title of the prince of the fourth rank for his merits. After Kangxi Emperor's death, Yuntao controlled Bordered Yellow Banner, in contradiction to the earlier records claiming his control over the Plain White Banner. Yuntao did not interfere in the succession war between his brothers, which affected his future. On 24 December 1722, Yuntao was made a first bearer of the Prince Lü of the Second Rank title. On 24 April 1724, the prince was demoted back to beizi and further downgraded to the grace defender duke for several delicts. On 14 July 1730, Yuntao was restored to the prince of the second rank. On 17 November 1735, Qianlong Emperor promoted him to Prince of the First Rank and tasked with overseeing the compilation of the imperial genealogy. On 25 April 1750, when Yuntao's heir presumptive died, his mother felt aggrieved and was later comforted by step grandson, Hongli. On 24 May 1757, Yuntao took Consort Dowager Ding to his manor for recuperation. Lady Wanlioha died at the age of 96 there, becoming the longest living imperial consort in the history of Qing. Yuntao died on 1 September 1763 and was posthumously honoured as Prince Lüyi of the First Rank (履懿亲王， meaning "implementing in a righteous way").

== Family ==
Primary Consort

- Imperial Princess Consort Luyi, of the Fuca clan (履懿亲王福晋 富察氏)
  - Second son (4 August 1706 – 15 May 1707)
  - Hongshi (2 August 1707 – 12 October 1710), third son

Secondary Consort

- Secondary consort, of the Fanggiya clan (侧福晋 方佳氏)
  - Fourth son (21 January 1729 – 30 April 1731)
  - Princess of the Third Rank (郡主, 21 August 1736 – 18 May 1825), fourth daughter
    - Married Mingliang of the Fuca clan in 1753 and had issue (one daughter)
  - Shizi Hongkun (27 October 1739 – 25 April 1750), fifth son
  - Sixth daughter (26 July 1741 – 17 January 1744)
  - Sixth son (2 June 1742 – 1742)
- Secondary consort, of the Gūwalgiya clan
  - Third daughter (22 February 1728)

Concubine

- Mistress, of the Ligiya clan
  - Princess of the Third Rank (郡主, 30 November 1703 – 19 March 1767), first daughter
    - Married Da'ermadadou of the Khorchin Borjigin clan in 1721
- Mistress, of the Mai clan
- Mistress, of the Wanggiya clan
  - Lady of the Third Rank (乡君, 18 February 1740 – 8 March 1797), fifth daughter
    - Married Gunqilaxi of the Borjigin clan in 1756
- Mistress, of the Chen clan
- Mistress, of the Yao clan
  - First son (24 March 1703 – 30 March 1703)
- Mistress, of the Li clan
  - Second daughter (8 July 1723 – July 1723)
