= Ge Yunfei =

Chinese general

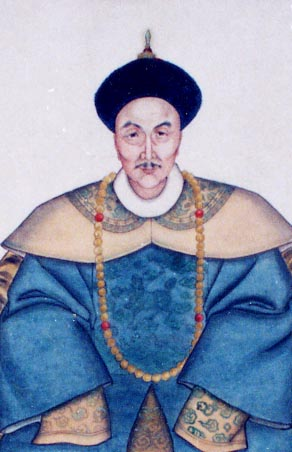
- Born: 1789; Shaoxing, Zhejiang
- Died: 1841 (aged 51–52)
- Conflicts: First Opium War: Capture of Chusan (1841) †

Ge Yunfei (simplified Chinese: 葛云飞; traditional Chinese: 葛雲飛, 1789–1841) was a Chinese general of the Qing dynasty. He served in the First Opium War and died during the British capture of Chusan.

Born in a military family in the Shanyin county of Zhejiang, Ge Yunfei learned kung fu from his father. In 1819, Ge passed the local imperial examination and acquired Military Juren title. In 1823, he passed the highest level of imperial examination and became military Jinshi.

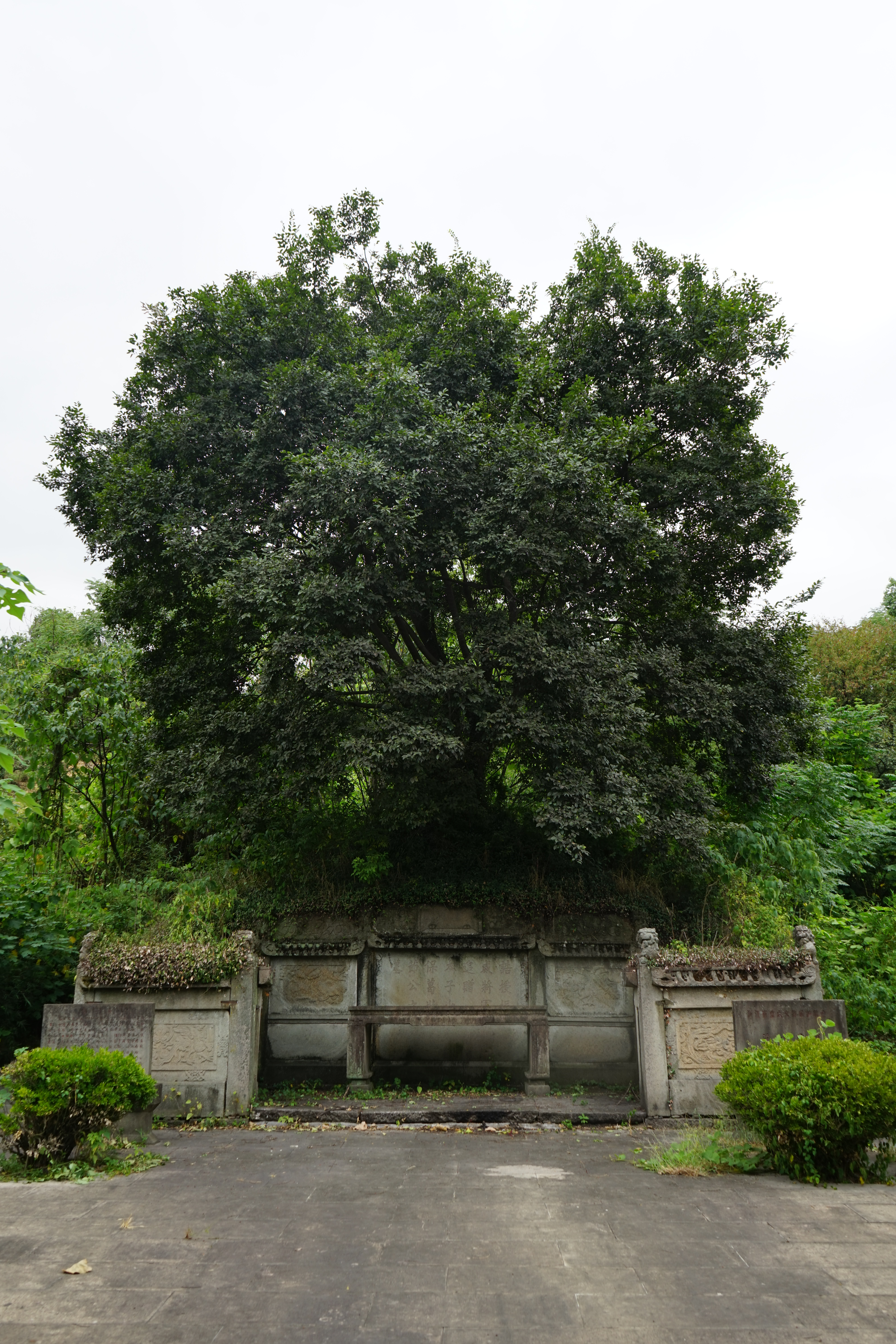
Tomb of Ge Yunfei.

He served for several years as assistant brigade commander in the navy based in Huangyan. In 1839, he was appointed as garrison commander of Zhenhai of Zhejiang. In September 1841, the British army attacked Zhenhai. Ge participated in the defense of Xiaofeng Mountain (晓峰) and Zhushan Gate (竹山门). He led the troop to fight in the rain for several days but the British army eventually seized the Zhushan Gate. Ge and over 200 soldiers continued fighting with swords. After being wounded over 40 times, he died of a major wound through the chest. His corpse was carried to Zhenhai by a villager named Xu Bao in the night.

The Daoguang Emperor wept after he learned Ge's death and gave him the pension as the level for a provincial commander-in-chief. Ge was buried north to Huangwan Temple, in the Sanquanwang Village of Xiaoshan County.
