= Mianyi =

- Beile

Prince Xun of the Third Rank
- Tenure: 28 January 1787 – 26 February 1809
- Predecessor: Yongzhang
- Successor: Yixu
- Born: 27 October 1771
- Died: 26 February 1809 (aged 37)
- Spouse: Lady Fuca (m. 1785-1798); Lady Tunggiya (m.1800-1809)
- Issue: Yixu; Yijing; Yiji
- Father: Yongxing
- Mother: Lady Fuca

Mianyi (綿懿; 27 October 1771 – 26 February 1809) was Yongxing's second son and the second holder of Prince Xun (循) peerage.

== Life ==
Mianyi was born on 27 October 1771 in the Manor of Yongxing, Prince Chengzhe of the First Rank. His mother was lady Fuca, a primary consort. In 1776, he was adopted into a Prince Xun peerage as Yongzhang's son. In 1785, he was sent to the Eastern Tour to Shandong, where he married his first princess consort, lady Fuca. The formal marriage was held in December 1785 at the imperial villa. 26 sheep, 30 tables, 30 banquet chairs and 40 vases of simmered rice vine were prepared for a wedding banquet by bride's father. The parents of princess consort were prohibited from hosting a banquet, unlike another imperial princes with consorts and officials. The costs of marriage and preparation of the prince's manor reached 50000 taels of silver, which was considered as extravagant.

Mianyi inherited the peerage as a beile in 1787. He was demoted to second class zhenguo jiangjun in 1804 for committing a grave offence and was upgraded to beizi in the following year. Mianyi died on 26 February 1809 and was posthumously restored as the Prince of the Third Rank. He was succeeded by his eldest son Yixu.

== Family ==
Mianyi was married to Lady Fuca, daughter of the governor of Shangong Mingxing since 1785. He remarried lady Tunggiya, daughter of third rank military official Yigui in 1798.

- Primary consort, of the Fuca clan (嫡夫人 富察氏)
  贝勒嫡夫人
  - Prince of the Fourth Rank Yixu (贝子奕绪; 7 July 1791 – 18 July 1858)
- Primary consort, of the Tunggiya clan (继夫人 佟佳氏)
  继夫人-->镇国将军夫人-->贝子夫人-->贝勒继夫人
- Mistress, of the Wu clan (妾 吴氏)
- Mistress, of the Ulatehake clan (妾乌拉特哈克氏)
  - Yijing (奕经; 28 October 1791 – 14 December 1853), second son
  - Yiji (奕纪; 17 December 1797 – 28 June 1863 ), third son
