= Yongzhang =

Qing dynasty prince (1735–1760)

- Prince Xun of the Second Rank 多羅循郡王

Head of the House of Prince Xun peerage
- Predecessor: position created
- Successor: Mianyi
- Born: 15 July 1735
- Died: 26 August 1760 (aged 25)
- Spouse: Lady Borjigit
- Father: Qianlong Emperor
- Mother: Imperial Noble Consort Chunhui

Yongzhang (永璋; 15 July 1735 – 26 August 1760) was the Qianlong Emperor's third son by Consort Chun.

== Life ==
Yongzhang was born in the Manor of Prince Bao on 15 July 1735 as the third son of Prince Bao of the First Rank, Hongli. His mother, Lady Su, held a title of mistress (庶福晋).

Yongzhang was not particularly excellent in horse riding because of lung disease, typical for his sister and mother. Some sources claim that his mother suffered from hemoptysis. When Yongzhang was seriously ill at the age of 15, Qianlong Emperor ordered lamas to pray for him. In 1748, he was tasked with overseeing the mourning of Empress Xiaoxianchun. Yongzhang was removed from the succession list together with his brother Yonghuang for his behavior during the funeral.

In 1759, the Imperial Noble Consort Chunhui fell sick in the Chengde Mountain Resort. Yongzhang brought his mother back to Beijing, where she died on 2 June 1760. He soon became ill and died less than three months after his mother on 26 August 1760, at the age of 25. He was posthumously honoured with the title "Prince Xun of the Second Rank".

== Family ==
Yongzhang was married to lady Borjigin, daughter of Heshuo Princess Shushen and Guanyinbao. He had no heirs; his sole son died prematurely and his daughter had no right to inherit the peerage after her marriage.

Primary Consort

- Primary consort, of the Khorchin Borjigin clan (嫡福晋)

Secondary Consort

- Secondary consort, of the Wanyan clan (侧福晋)
  - First son (19 January 1756 – 14 February 1756)
- Secondary consort, of an unknown clan (侧福晋; d. 1759)
- Secondary consort, of the Gūwalgiya clan (侧福晋)
  - Lady of the Second Rank (县君; 29 July 1755 – 24 March 1777), first daughter
    - Married Danba Dorji, of the Harqin Ulanghaigimot clan
