= Battle of Chinhai =

1841 battle between Britain and China during the First Opium War

Coordinates: 29°58′N 121°43′E

- Part of the First Opium War
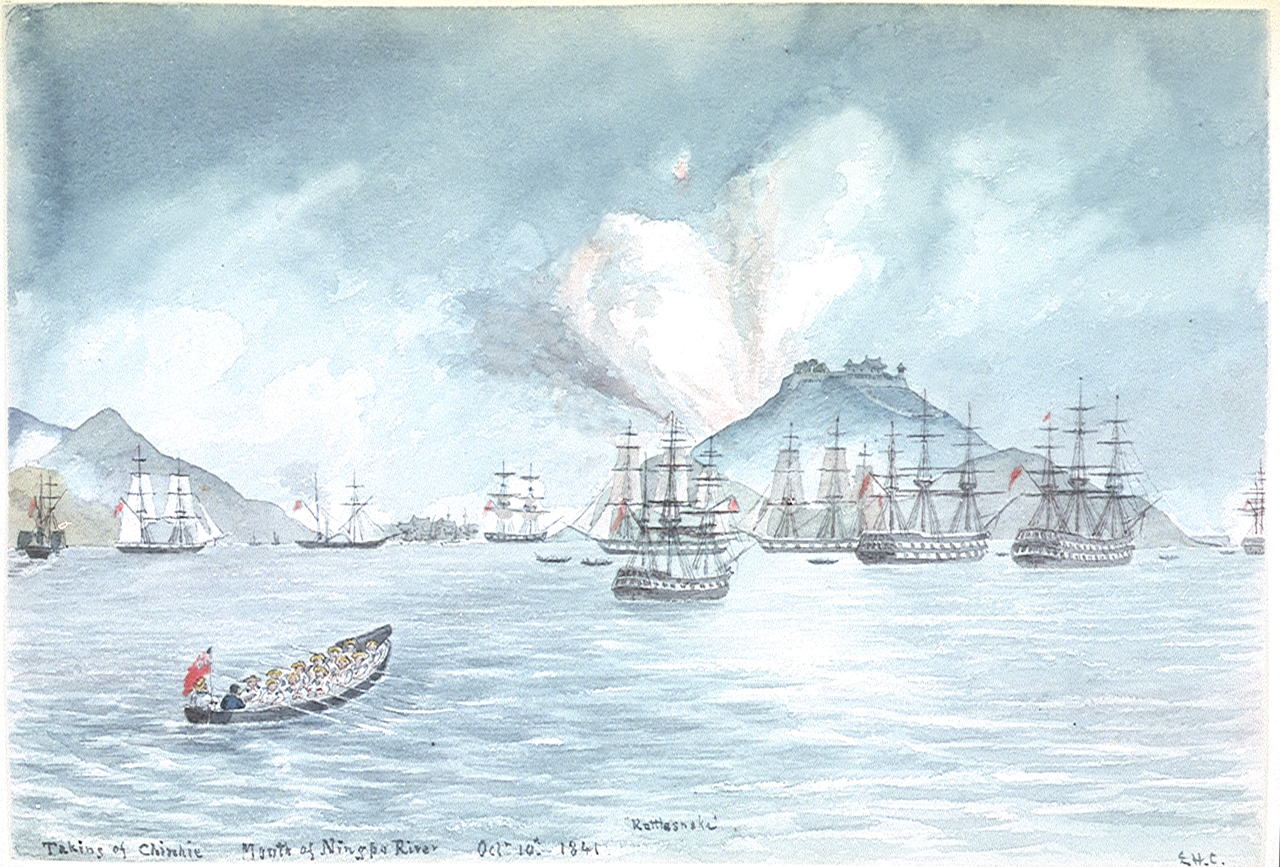
- Taking of Chinhai at the mouth of the Ningbo River, showing HMS Rattlesnake (centre)
Date	10 October 1841
Location	Zhenhai, Zhejiang, China
Result	British victory

Belligerents
United Kingdom: British East India Company	Qing China

Commanders and leaders
Viscount Gough	Commissioner Yukien; General Yu Pu-yun

Strength
10 ships 2,098	8,000–9,000; 157+ guns

Casualties and losses
3 killed 16 wounded	Several hundred casualties 157 guns captured

The Battle of Chinhai (Chinese: 鎮海之戰) was fought between British and Chinese forces in Chinhai (Zhenhai), Zhejiang province, China, on the 10 October 1841 during the First Opium War. The Chinese force consisted of a garrison of Manchu and Mongol Bannermen. The British capture of this city allowed them to seize Ningbo unopposed on 13 October.

== Gallery ==
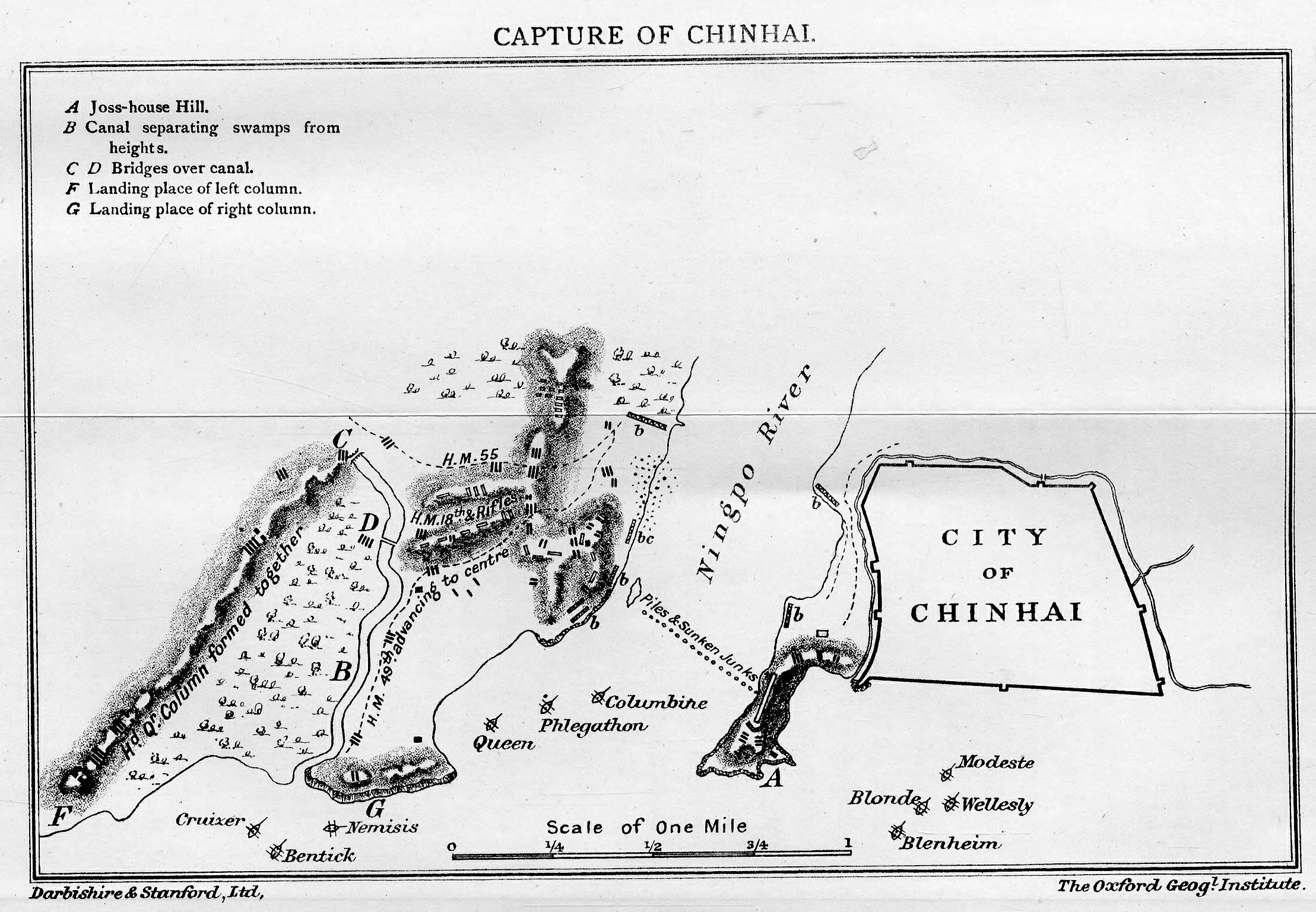
Map of the battle

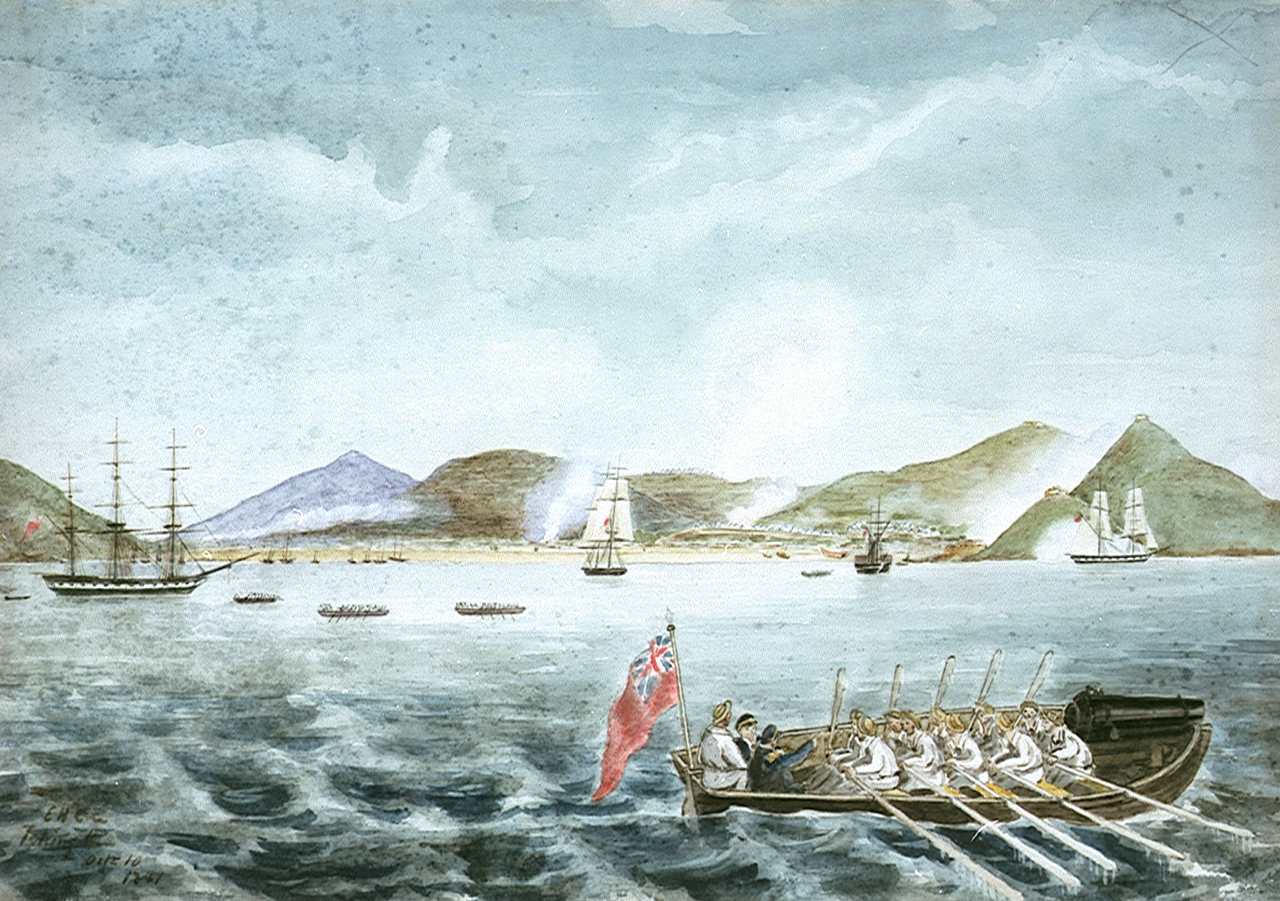
British rowboat at Chinhai

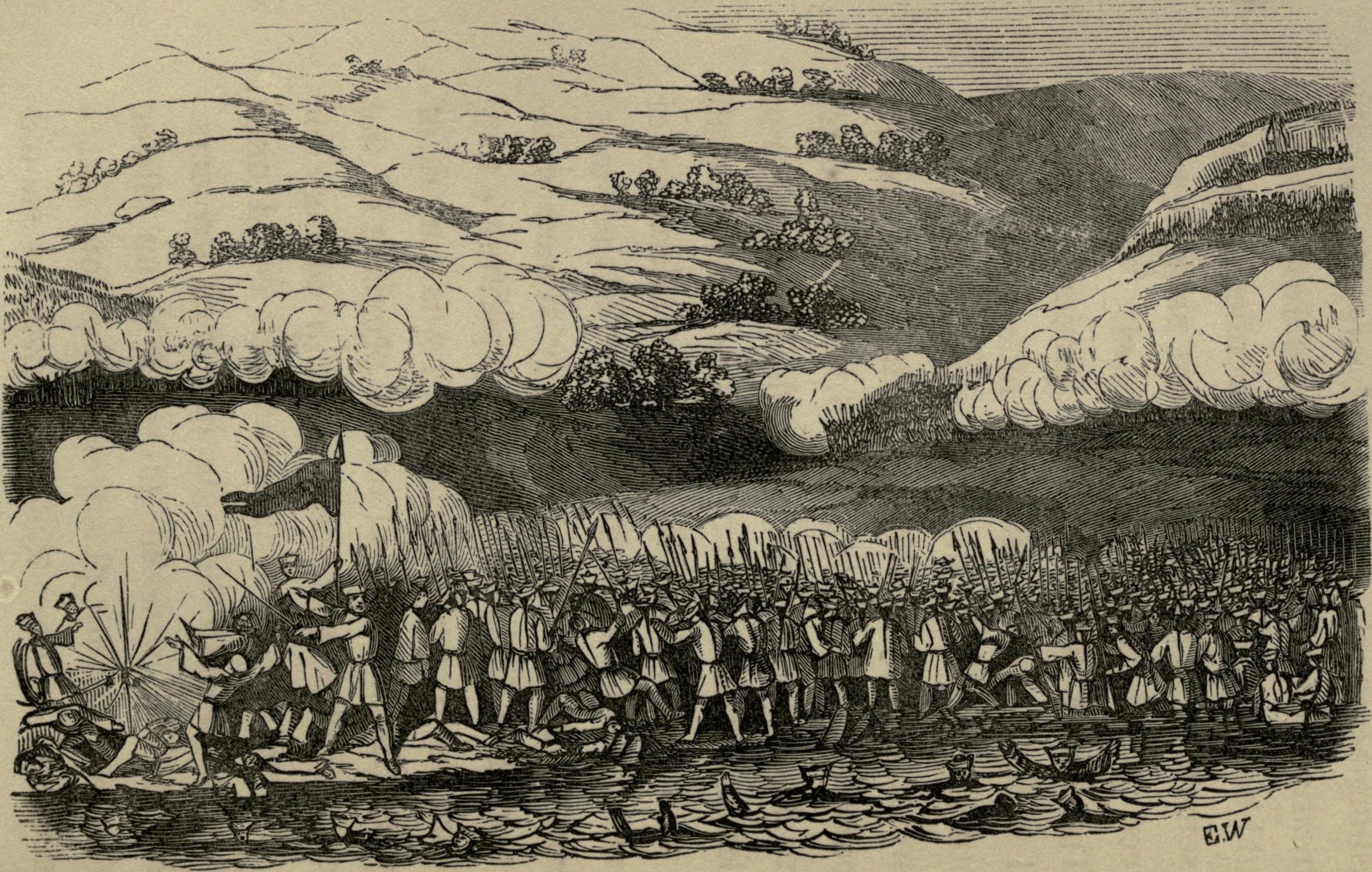
Close of the engagement

== Bibliography ==
- Hall, William Hutcheon; Bernard, William Dallas (1846). The Nemesis in China (3rd ed.). London: Henry Colburn.
- MacPherson, Duncan (1843). Two Years in China (2nd ed.). London: Saunders and Otley

=== Further reading ===
- The Chinese Repository. Volume 10. Canton. 1841. pp. 680–682.
