= Prince Cheng of the First Rank =

Chinese name
- Traditional Chinese: 和碩成親王
- Simplified Chinese: 和硕成亲王
Transcriptions
Standard Mandarin
- Hanyu Pinyin: héshuò chéng qīnwáng
- Wade–Giles: ho-shuo ch'eng ch'in-wang

Manchu name
- Manchu script: ᡥᠣᡧᠣᡳ ᠮᡠᡨᡝᡵᡝᠩᡤᡝ ᠴᡳᠨ ᠸᠠᠩ
- Romanization: hošoi muterengge cin wang

Prince Cheng of the First Rank, or simply Prince Cheng, was the title of a princely peerage used in China during the Manchu-led Qing dynasty (1644–1912). As the Prince Cheng peerage was not awarded "iron-cap" status, this meant that each successive bearer of the title would normally start off with a title downgraded by one rank vis-à-vis that held by his predecessor. However, the title would generally not be downgraded to any lower than a feng'en fuguo gong except under special circumstances.

The first bearer of the title was Yongxing (永瑆; 1752–1823), the Qianlong Emperor's 11th son, who was made "Prince Cheng of the First Rank" in 1789. The title was passed down over seven generations and held by seven people.

== Members of the Prince Cheng peerage ==
Members of the Prince Cheng peerage
- Yongxing (永瑆; 1752 – 1823; 1st), the Qianlong Emperor's 11th son, held the title Prince Cheng of the First Rank from 1789 to 1823, posthumously honoured as Prince Chengzhe of the First Rank (成哲親王)
  - 1 Mianqin (綿懃; 1768 – 1820; 2nd), initially a lesser bulwark duke, promoted to beile in 1802, posthumously promoted to Prince Cheng of the Second Rank in 1820
    - 1 Yishou (奕綬; 1786 – 1812; 3rd), posthumously granted as a lesser bulwark duke in 1812, posthumously promoted to Prince Cheng of the Second Rank in 1823
      - 1 Zairui (載銳; 1805 – 1859; 4th), initially a defender general from 1813 to 1820, promoted to beile in 1820, held the title Prince Cheng of the Second Rank from 1823 to 1859, posthumously honoured as Prince Chenggong of the Second Rank (成恭郡王)
        - 1 Puzhuang (溥莊; 1830 – 1872; 5th), initially a third class defender general from 1858 to 1859, held the title of a beile from 1859 to 1872, made an acting junwang in 1860, had no male heir
        - 2 & 3 Puying (溥英) & Puhua (溥華)
        - 4 Pulan (溥蘭; 1833 – 1879), held the title of a third class defender general from 1857 to 1879
          - 2 Yugao (毓杲; born 1864), held the title of a third class bulwark general from 1879
            - Hengqi (恒奇; born 1893)
        - 5 Puwei (溥蔚; 1834 – 1901), held the title of a third class defender general from 1857 to 1901
          - Yutong (毓桐; 1890 – 1901), had no male heir
        - 6 Puyun (溥蘊; 1837 – 1864), held the title of a defender general from 1857 to 1862, his title stripped in 1862
          - Yubo (毓柏; 1858 – 1865), had no male heir
        - 7 Puzhen (溥蓁; 1839 – 1864)
          - 1 Yusu (毓橚; 1858 – 1918; 6th), adopted as Puzhuang's son and successor, held the title of a beizi from 1872 to 1918
            - 1 & 2 Hengxi (恆喜) and Hengzhao (恆照)
            - 3 Hengyan (恆燕; born 1893; 7th), held the title of a grace defender duke from 1922
            - 4, 5, 6, 7 & 8 Henglie (恆煭), Hengxiu (恆烋), Hengyang (恆𤋁), Hengfeng (恆㶻) & Hengchi (恆𤈕)
        - 8, 9, 10 & 11 Pusong (溥松), Pufei (溥芾), Purong (溥蓉) & Puyin (溥茵)
        - 12 Pubao (溥葆; 1849 – 1889), held the title of a third class defender general from 1868 to 1889
          - 1 Yuzhen (毓振; 1882 – 1895), held the title of a bulwark general from 1890 to 1895
          - 2 Yukui (毓揆; born 1885)
        - 13 Puju (溥菊; 1849 – 1884), held the title of a third class supporter general from 1872 to 1884
          - Yuqi (毓啟; 1877 – 1877), had no male heir
        - 14 Puheng (溥蘅; 1853–1901), Zairui's 14th son, held the title of a third class supporter general from 1872 to 1901
          - 1 Yupu (毓樸; born 1878), held the title of a grace general from 1902
            - Hengxun (恆勳; born 1911)
    - 8 Yiru (奕繻; 1809 - 1845), held the title of a first class bulwark general from 1829 to 1845
      - Zaiqiao (載翹; 1828–1839), had no male heir
    - 9 Yichuo (奕綽; 1818 – 1863), held the title of a grace general from 1838 to 1863
      - Zaiyun (載筠; 1839 – 1842), had no male heir
    - 11 Yifu (奕綍; 1820 – 1854), held the title of a first class bulwark general from 1844 to 1854
      - 1 Zaiding (載碠; 1839 – 1906), held the title of a grace general from 1854 to 1906
        - Pukun (溥堃; 1875 – 1881), had no male heir
      - 2 Zaiying (載碤; 1840 – 1894), held the title of a third class supporter general from 1868 to 1894, had no male heir
      - 3 Zai[shi'an] (載[石安]; 1842 – 1900), held the title of a third class supporter general from 1868 to 1900
        - 1 Pujing (溥敬; born 1883), Zai-?'s eldest son, held the title of a grace general from 1902
          - Yuchun (毓椿; born 1904)
      - 4 Zailin (載碄; 1852 – 1898), held the title of a third class supporter general from 1872 to 1898
        - Purong (溥傛; 1886–1894), had no male heir
  - 2 Mianyi (綿懿; 1771 – 1809), adopted as son of Yongzhang, Prince Xun (循) of the Second Rank
  - 3 Miancong (綿聰; 1775 – 1828), initially a bulwark general, promoted to defender general in 1823, posthumously promoted to lesser bulwark duke in 1828
    - 2 Yixiu (奕繡; 1812 – 1886), held the title of a third class bulwark general from 1828 to 1886
      - Zaiqin (載芹; born 1862)
        - Pushen (溥伸; born 1885)
          - Yuxiang (毓祥; born 1901)
  - 7 Mianbin (綿儐; 1796 – 1841), held the title of a defender general from 1821 to 1841
    - 2 Yishu (奕𩆩; 1835 – 1897), held the title of a second class bulwark general from 1841 to 1897
      - Zaishan (載山; 1855–1909), Yishu's eldest son, held the title of a third class fengguo jiangjun from 1874 to 1909
        - 1 Puzheng (溥正; born 1881), held the title of a grace general from 1910
      - 5 Zaijun (載峻; 1864 – 1899), held the title of a third class supporter general from 1878 to 1899, had no male heir
      - 6 Zaikun (載崐; 1865 – 1906), held the title of a third class supporter general from 1903 to 1906
        - 1 Pubai (溥栢; born 1905), held the title of a grace general from 1907
      - 8 Zailing (載岭; born 1874), held the title of a third class supporter generall from 1893
      - 9 Zaiyong (載㟾; born 1878), held the title of a third class supporter general from 1903
      - 11 Zaiyue (載岳; born 1887), held the title of a third class supporter general from 1906

== Family tree ==
Family tree main line

Qianlong Emperor
11
Yongxing ^{1} 永瑆; 1752 – 1823; Prince Cheng Zhe of the First Rank 成哲親王; 1789 – 1823
1
Mianqin ^{2} 綿懃; 1768 – 1820; Prince Cheng of the Second Rank 成郡王 (posthumously awarded)
1
Yishou ^{3} 奕綬; 1786 – 1812; Prince Cheng of the Second Rank 成郡王 (posthumously awarded)
1
Zairui ^{4} 載銳; 1805 – 1859; Prince Cheng Gong of the Second Rank 成恭郡王; 1823 – 1859
1	7
Puzhuang ^{5} 溥莊; 1830 – 1872; Beile and Acting Junwang 郡王銜貝勒; 1860 – 1872	Puzhen 溥蓁; 1839 – 1864
1
Yusu ^{6} 毓橚; 1858 – 1918; Beizi 貝子; 1872 – 1918
3
Hengyan ^{7} 恆燕 b.1893 Feng'en Zhenguo Gong 奉恩鎮國公; 1922 – ?

Legend:
- - Title bearers
- - Emperors

adoption

== See also ==
- Prince Xun (循)
- Royal and noble ranks of the Qing dynasty
