= Fuk'anggan =

Manchu nobleman and general

Prince Jiayong of the Second Rank Baturu Jiayong Fuk'anggan
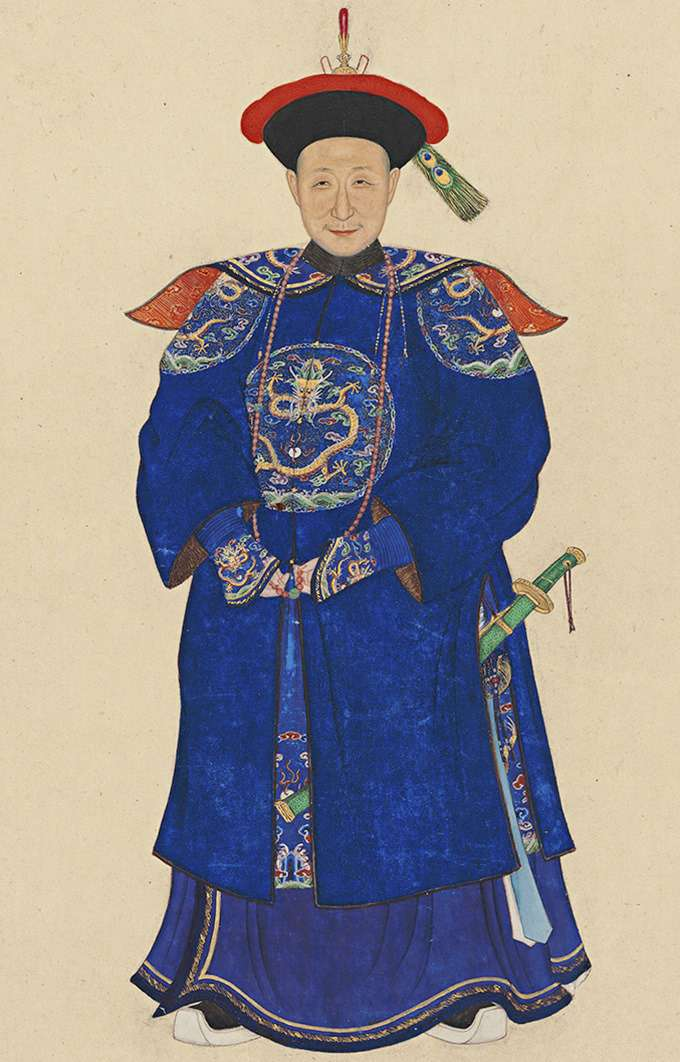

Grand Councillor
- In office 1783–1784
- In office 1776–1777
- In office 1772–1772

Grand Secretary of the Wuying Hall
- In office 1792–1796 Serving with Agui
- Preceded by: Agui
- Succeeded by: Agui

Assistant Grand Secretary
- In office 1786–1792

Minister of Personnel
- In office 1786–1792 Serving with Liu Yong (until 1789), Peng Yuanrui (1789–1791), Sun Shiyi (since 1791)
- Preceded by: Heshen
- Succeeded by: Jin Jian

Viceroy of Liangguang
- In office 19 February 1789 – 14 September 1793
- Preceded by: Sun Shiyi
- Succeeded by: Changlin

Personal details
- Born: 1748
- Died: 1796 (aged 47–48)
- Relations: Empress Xiaoxianchun (paternal aunt); Qianlong Emperor (uncle-in-law); Yonglian (first cousin); Princess Hejing (first cousin); Fuqing (paternal uncle); Consort Shu (maternal aunt); Princess Hejia (sister-in-law); Yongxing (brother-in-law); Mingrui (first cousin); Mingliang (first cousin)
- Parents: Fuheng (father); Lady Yehe-Nara (mother)
- Clan: Fuca
- Posthumous name: Wenxiang (文襄)

Military service
- Allegiance: Qing dynasty
- Branch/service: Bordered Yellow Banner
- Battles/wars: Jinchuan campaigns; Lin Shuangwen rebellion; Sino-Nepalese War; Miao Rebellion

Fuk'anggan (Manchu:ᡶᡠᠺᠠᠩᡤᠠᠨ, Möllendorff: Fuk'anggan; Chinese: 福康安; pinyin: Fúkāng'ān; 1748–1796), courtesy name Yaolin (瑶林; 瑤林; Yáolín), was a Qing dynasty general from the Fuca clan of the Manchu Bordered Yellow Banner.

Fuk'anggan's father, Fuheng, brother of the Empress Xiaoxianchun, served as a grand minister of state during the middle years of the reign of the Qianlong Emperor. Fuk'anggan held various offices throughout Qianlong's reign, including Governor-General, Viceroy of Liangjiang and Viceroy of Liangguang.

The Salar Jahriyya revolt in Gansu was put down by Fuk'anggan along with Agui and Li Shiyao in 1784, while Heshen was recalled for his failure during the revolt.

In 1787, 300,000 people took part in the Lin Shuangwen rebellion in Taiwan against the Qing government. Fuk'anggan commanded 20,000 troops and suppressed the rebellion. In 1790, the Nepalese Gurkha army invaded Tibet and the 8th Dalai Lama, Jamphel Gyatso, escaped from Lhasa and appealed to the Qing government for help. The Qianlong Emperor appointed Fuk'anggan as commander-in-chief of the Tibetan campaign, and the general attacked the Gurkhas until they reach Nuwakot, and being keen to protect their troops, went for negotiation in the Sino-Nepalese War.

== Death ==
In early 1795, the Miao Rebellion of 1795 broke out in the provinces of the provinces of Guizhou, Hunan, and Sichuan. Fuk'anggan was sent to suppress the rebellion along with other Manchu generals, and later died in camp in May or June 1796.

== Titles ==
- 1776–1784: Viscount Jiayong of the Third Rank (三等嘉勇男)
- 1784–1787: Marquiss Jiayong of the First Rank (一等嘉勇侯)
- 1787–1793: Duke Jiayong of the First Rank (一等嘉勇公)
- 1793–1796: Duke Zhongrui Jiayong (忠銳嘉勇公)
- Posthumous title: Prince Jiayong of the Second Rank (嘉勇郡王)

== In popular culture ==
- As a character in Jin Yong's novel The Book and the Sword and The Young Flying Fox
- Portrayed by Wang Yizhe in Yanxi Palace: Princess Adventure (2019)
- Portrayed by Ye Xiangming in Side Story of Volant Fox (2022)

Government offices
Preceded by Sun Shiyi	Viceroy of Liangguang; 1789─1793	Succeeded by Zhanglin
