= Mingliang =

Marquis Xiangyong of the Third Class; Prince Consort; Mingliang
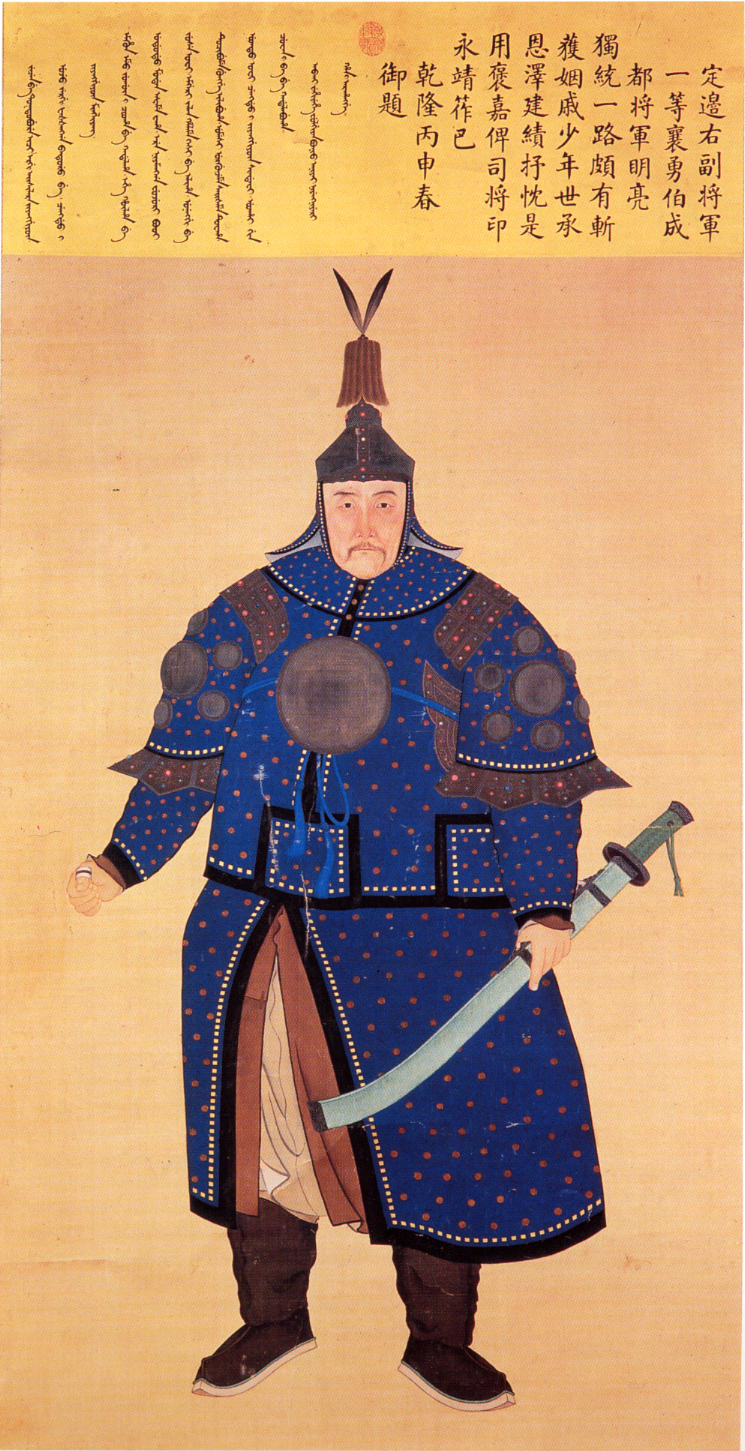
- Portrait of Mingliang, late 1700s

Grand Councillor
- In office 1776

Grand Secretary of the Wuying Hall
- In office 1817–1821

Assistant Grand Secretary
- In office 1814–1817
- In office 1810–1811

Minister of War
- In office 26 September 1814 – 15 July 1817 Serving with Chu Pengling (until 1815), Wu Jing (1815–1817), Lu Yinpu (since 1817)
- Preceded by: Hūturi
- Succeeded by: Hening
- In office 16 December 1813 – 12 May 1814 Serving with Liu Xuanzhi
- Preceded by: Fuking
- Succeeded by: Hening
- In office 17 July 1804 – 25 July 1811 Serving with Liu Quanzhi (until 1805; 1807–1811), Chen Dawen (1805), Zou Bingtai (1805–1807), Liu Xuanzhi (since 1811)
- Preceded by: Changlin
- Succeeded by: Gūnggala

General of Ili
- In office 1798–1799
- Preceded by: Baoning
- Succeeded by: Baoning
- In office June – July 1784
- Preceded by: Iletu
- Succeeded by: Hailu

General of Heilongjiang
- In office 1791–1794
- Preceded by: Du'erjia
- Succeeded by: Shuliang

Minister of Justice
- In office 30 September 1790 – 20 January 1791 Serving with Hu Jitang
- Preceded by: Kaning'a
- Succeeded by: Suringga

Personal details
- Born: 1736
- Died: 1822 (aged 85–86)
- Relations: Empress Xiaoxianchun (paternal aunt); Qianlong Emperor (uncle-in-law); Yonglian (first cousin); Princess Hejing (first cousin); Fuheng (paternal uncle); Fuk'anggan (first cousin); Fuqing (paternal uncle); Mingrui (first cousin); Yuntao (father-in-law); Yongfu (son-in-law)
- Clan: Fuca
- Posthumous name: Wenxiang (文襄)

Military service
- Allegiance: Qing dynasty
- Branch/service: Bordered Yellow Banner
- Rank: General
- Battles/wars: Jinchuan campaigns; White Lotus Rebellion; Miao Rebellion

Mingliang (Manchu: ᠮᡳᠩᠯᡳᠶᠠᠩ, romanized: Mingliyang; Chinese: 明亮; pinyin: Míngliàng; 1736–1822), courtesy name Yinzhai (寅齋), was a Qing dynasty official and general from the Fuca clan of the Manchu Bordered Yellow Banner.

Mingliang was a nephew of Empress Xiaoxianchun and married a daughter of Yuntao, Prince Lü of the First Rank, in 1753. He had served as deputy lieutenant-general of the Han Plain White Banner (正白旗漢軍副都統), deputy lieutenant-general of Jilin (吉林副都統), deputy lieutenant-general of Ningguta, Commander of the Guards Division (護軍統領), general of Guangzhou (廣州將軍), deputy commander of the imperial bodyguards (內大臣), general of Chengdu, lieutenant-general of Ürümchi (烏魯木齊都統), ministerial attache of Ili (伊犁參贊大臣), ministerial attache of Uqturpan, ministerial attache of Kashgar, general of Heilongjiang, general of Ili, lieutenant-general of the Han Plain Red Banner (正紅旗漢軍都統), lieutenant-general of the Manchu Bordered Blue Banner (鑲藍旗滿洲都統), general of Xi'an, Minister of War, and in other positions. As a general, he participated in the Jinchuan campaigns, and in putting down the White Lotus Rebellion and the Miao Rebellion.
