= Mingrui =

Qing dynasty general

Duke Yiyong of the First Class Mingrui
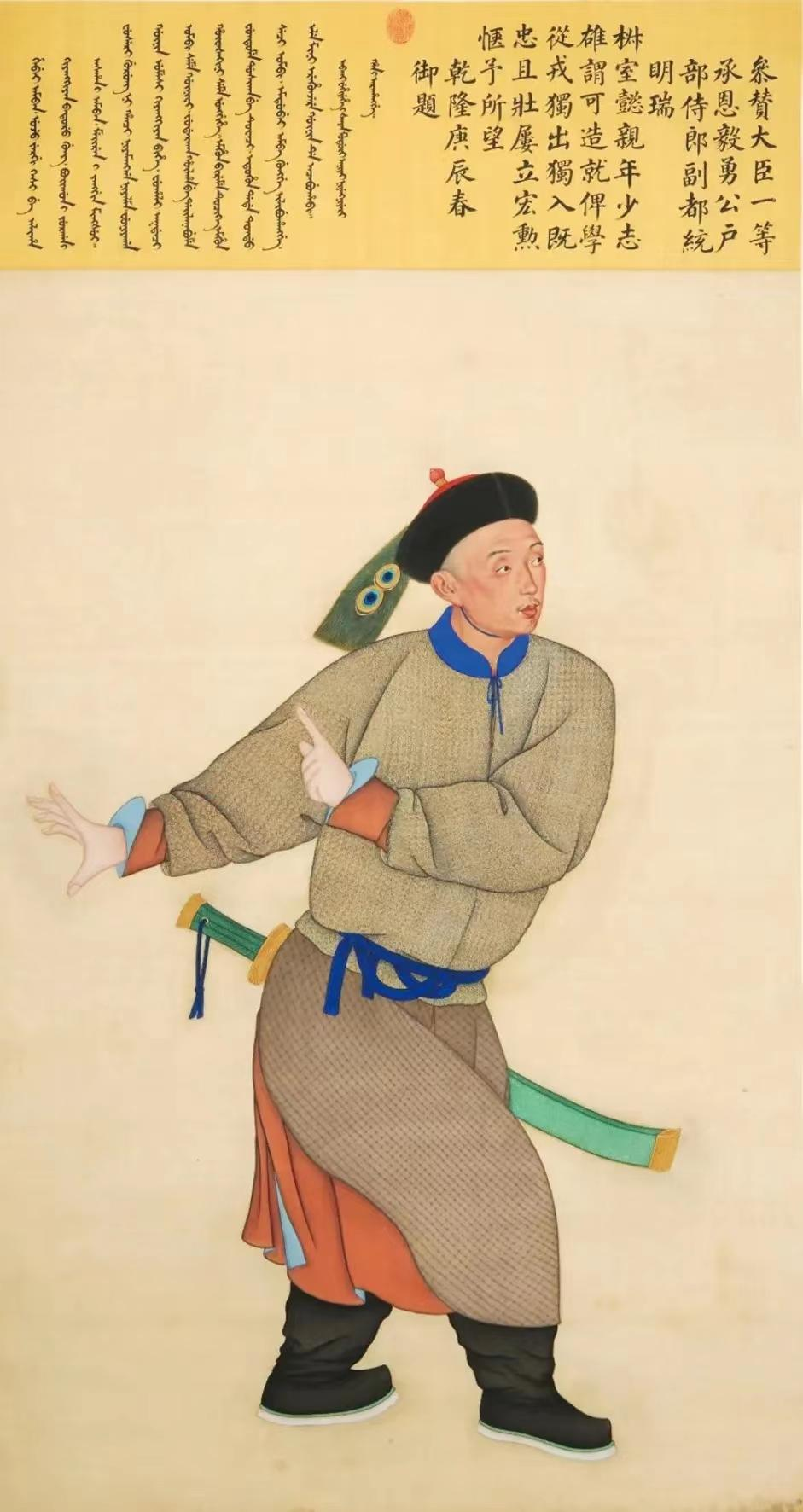
- Portrait of Mingrui in the Ziguang Hall (紫光阁) in Zhongnanhai, Beijing

Minister of War
- In office March 1767 – 27 March 1768 Serving with Lu Zongkai
- Preceded by: Toyong
- Succeeded by: Fulong'an

Viceroy of Yun-Gui
- In office 30 March 1767 – 27 March 1768
- Preceded by: Yang Yingju
- Succeeded by: Oning

General of Ili
- In office October 1762 – March 1767
- Preceded by: Position established
- Succeeded by: Agui

Personal details
- Born: 1730 Shuntian Prefecture, Zhili, Qing China
- Died: 27 March 1768 (aged 37–38) Near Pyinoolwin, Kingdom of Myanmar
- Relations: Empress Xiaoxianchun (paternal aunt); Qianlong Emperor (uncle-in-law); Yonglian (first cousin); Princess Hejing (first cousin); Fuheng (paternal uncle); Fuk'anggan (first cousin); Fuqing (paternal uncle); Mingliang (first cousin)
- Clan: Fuca
- Posthumous name: Guolie (果烈)

Military service
- Allegiance: Qing dynasty
- Branch/service: Bordered Yellow Banner
- Rank: General
- Battles/wars: Amursana's rebellion; Revolt of the Altishahr Khojas; Uqturpan Uprising; Sino-Burmese War (1767–1768)

Mingrui (Manchu: ᠮᡳᠩᡧᡠᡳ, romanized: Mingšui; Chinese: 明瑞; pinyin: Míngruì; Burmese: မင်းယွီ, Burmese pronunciation: [mɪ́ɰ̃ jwì]; 1730 – 27 March 1768), courtesy name Yunting (筠亭), was a Qing dynasty general. He was a nephew of Empress Xiaoxianchun and served as the commander of Qing troops in campaigns in Xinjiang and Burma.

== Biography ==
=== Early years ===
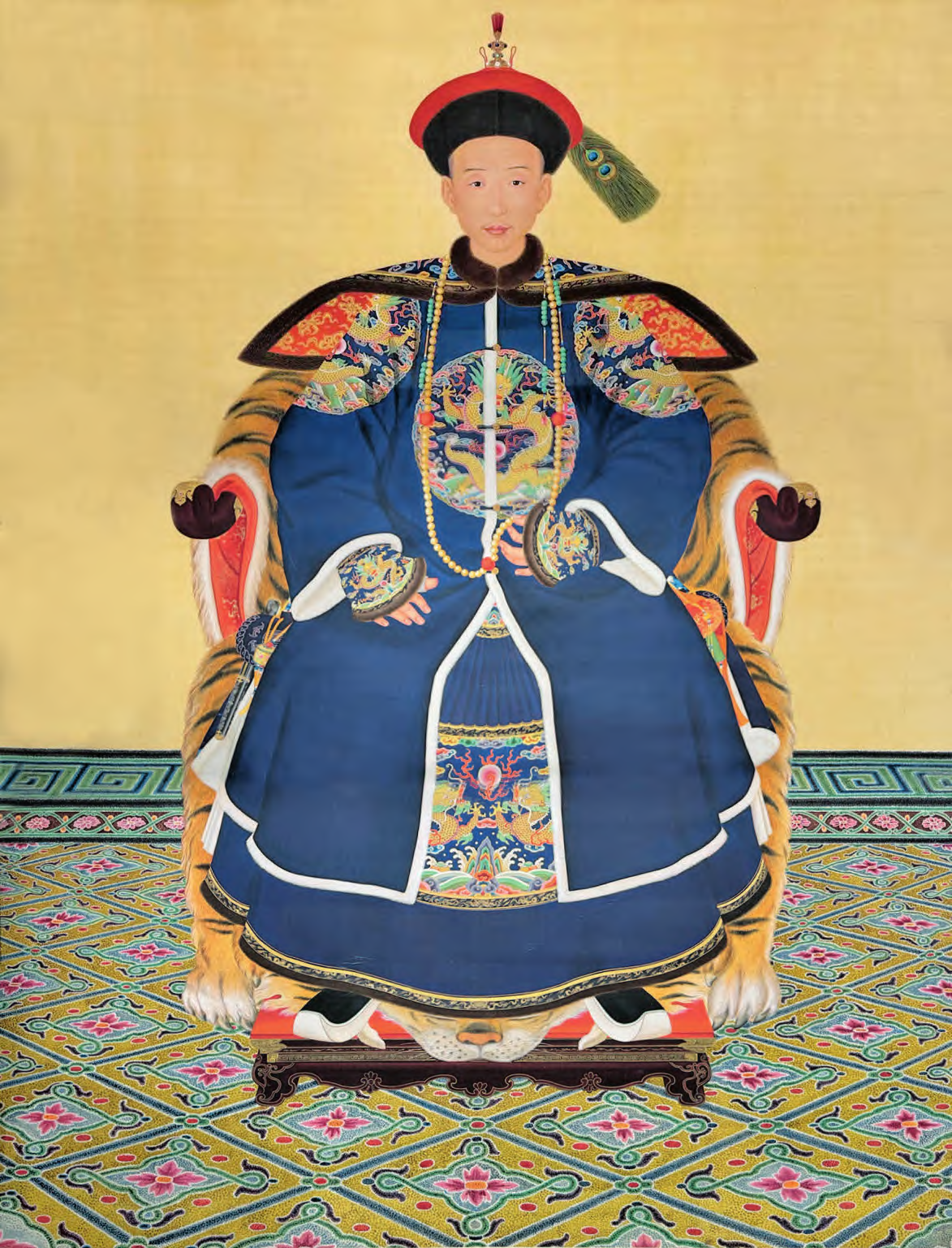
Portrait of Mingrui, now in the National Museum of China

Mingrui belonged to the Fuca clan of the Manchu Bordered Yellow Banner. His father was Fuwen, Duke Cheng'en (承恩公 傅文), his grandfather was Lirongbao (李榮保; 1674–1723), a high official in Kangxi's reign, one of his uncles was Fuheng, and his aunt was Empress Xiaoxianchun, thus the Qianlong Emperor was his uncle.

=== Suppressing Muslim rebellion ===
n 1756, Mingrui was appointed by Qianlong Emperor as a commanding officer (領隊大臣) with the rank of vice commander-in-chief (副都统) to lead the campaign against Amursana. Due to his contributions in quelling the rebellion, he was promoted to vice minister of the Ministry of Revenue (户部) and subsequently granted the title of military advisor (參贊大臣). Additionally, the honorific Duke Yiyong of the First Class ("毅勇", lit. "resolute and brave") was added to his ducal title.

In 1759, Mingrui led the campaign against Khoja Kalan and was rewarded with the privilege of wearing double-eyed peacock feathers for his merits. Upon his triumphant return, the Qianlong Emperor had his portrait displayed in the Ziguang Hall (紫光阁). Shortly afterward, Mingrui was promoted to the position of commander-in-chief (户部) of the Han Bordered White Banner.

In 1762, Mingrui was appointed as the first Military Governor of Ili and granted the additional hereditary title of Qiduwei (骑都尉; a higher hereditary rank). Undeniably, within less than a decade, Mingrui rose rapidly through the ranks, repeatedly assuming key positions and receiving rewards and commendations from the Qianlong Emperor for his military achievements—his ascent was remarkably swift.

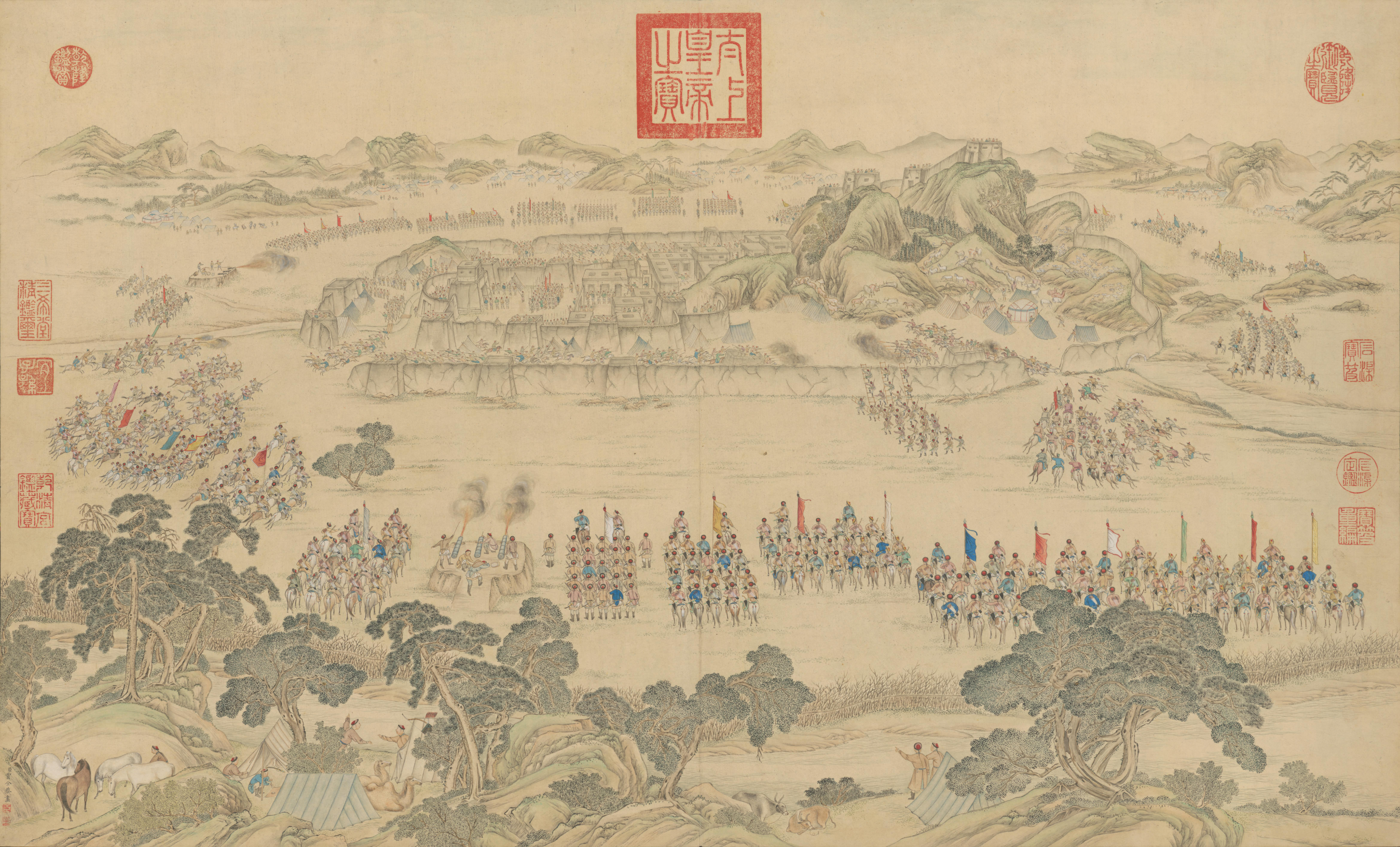
Suppressing the Uqturpan Muslim Rebellion by Jia Quan, now in Palace Museum, Beijing

In 1765, the Muslim Uyghurs in Uqturpan rebelled. The deputy commander-in-chief stationed in Uqturpan, Sucheng, committed suicide, and the rebels elected the Uyghur leader and minor beg (chieftain) Laiheimutula as their commander to resist the Qing forces. Mingrui dispatched the deputy commander-in-chief Guanyinbao to lead the suppression campaign while he himself commanded from the rear. Laiheimutula sent out 2,000 troops to engage the Qing army, but Mingrui and Guanyinbao encircled and ultimately defeated them.

Mingrui was the first General of Ili from October 1762 to March 1767 and then viceroy of Yunnan and Guizhou from April 1767 to March 1768.

=== Burma Campaign ===
In 1765, the border conflict broke out between Konbaung dynasty of Myanmar and China, Governor-General Liu Zao suffered repeated defeats in battle and committed suicide. Grand Secretary Yang Yingju was appointed as his replacement, but after a long and fruitless campaign, he was ordered to take his own life.

In March 1767, Mingrui was appointed as Viceroy of Yun-Gui and concurrently Minister of War, tasked with overseeing military affairs. Mingrui planned for the main force to advance from Yongchang and Tengyue to attack Wanting and Mobang, while ordering Deputy Commander E'erdeng'e to take the northern route, advancing from Mengmi to attack Laoguantun, with the objective of converging on Ava.

His 1767–1768 campaign was the most successful of the four invasions by the Chinese. In the December, Mingrui reached Wanting and advanced to attack Mobang (木邦, now Hsenwi State). The enemy fled, so he left Deputy Commander Zhulu'ne and Provincial Surveillance Commissioner Yang Chongying to guard it. He then led over 10,000 troops across the Xibuo River to attack Manjie (蠻結).

The Burmese troops, numbering 20,000, had constructed 16 fortified stockades. Outside the stockades, they had dug trenches, and beyond the trenches erected wooden palisades, behind which they arranged elephants in formation as ambush troops. Mingrui commanded the central force himself. Commanders Zhalafeng'a and Li Quan occupied the eastern ridge, while Guanyinbao and Changqing took position on the western ridge.

The enemy launched an assault from the west; Guanyinbao and Changqing fought valiantly. Mingrui led the central army forward, killing over two hundred enemies, forcing the remainder to retreat behind the palisades. Mingrui then ordered his forces to divide into twelve units. He personally led a charge into the enemy formation and, though wounded in the eye, continued to command without faltering.

Amid the fighting, the enemy elephants panicked and stampeded back into their own ranks. Mingrui’s troops broke through the palisades and fought fiercely, each soldier displaying the strength of a hundred men. One soldier from Guizhou, Wang Lian, wielding a rattan shield, leapt into the enemy formation, with his comrades following close behind. They fought their way through, killing over 20 enemies and capturing 34.

His army was annihilated at the Battle of Maymyo in March 1768. He committed suicide, and sent in his queue to the emperor as a token of loyalty. The Qianlong Emperor ordered Manchu general Eledeng'e (also spelled E'erdeng'e; 額爾登額) to be sliced to death after his commander Mingrui was defeated at the Battle of Maymyo due to Eledeng'e not being able to help flank Mingrui because he did not arrive at a rendezvous.

The Qianlong Emperor wrote for him:

凡經百余戰, 戰必先眾軍.
不謂世胄家, 而有如此人.
讀書知大義, 挽勁鮮與倫.
In hundred battles he led the line,
A man of merit, not of noble sign.
Well-read, he knew the righteous way,
Strong-armed, unmatched in the fray.

短身既精悍, 謀略兼出群.
功難僂指數, 嘉賫匪因親.
Though short in form, his spirit soared,
His schemes and plans outshone the horde.
His deeds are countless, hard to tell,
No kinship favor—earned them well.

征緬次孟臘, 獨入克捷頻.
恨遇忌功者, 逍遙河上陳.
In Burma’s fields, at Mengla’s wall,
He charged alone and won them all.
But jealous hearts his light did chain,
He lingered idly by the plain.

力戰絕後繼, 終焉捐其身.
於爾無悔怨, 於我增悲辛.
不須讀杜牧, 謂過趙使君.
He fought till none were left behind,
And gave his life with steadfast mind.
No blame from him, yet grief I bear,
No need for Du Mu’s verse to compare.

== See also ==
- Ten Great Campaigns
- Xinjiang under Qing rule
- Empress Xiaoxianchun, wife of Qianlong and paternal aunt of Mingrui
