= Fuheng =

Qing dynasty official (1720–1770)

Duke Zhongyong of the First Class Fuheng
- Portrait of Fuheng in Ziguang Hall, Zhongnanhai, Beijing

Chief Grand Councillor
- In office 26 November 1748 – 2 September 1770
- Preceded by: Necin
- Succeeded by: Yengišan

Grand Councillor
- In office 14 May 1745 – 2 September 1770 (as the Chief Grand Councillor since 1748)

Grand Secretary of the Baohe Hall
- In office 26 November 1748 – 2 September 1770

Assistant Grand Secretary
- In office March 1748 – 26 November 1748

Minister of Revenue
- In office 14 May 1747 – 26 November 1748 Serving with Liang Shizheng
- Preceded by: Haiwang
- Succeeded by: Yengišan

Personal details
- Born: 8 March 1722 Shuntian Prefecture, North Zhili
- Died: 2 September 1770 (aged 48) Shuntian Prefecture, North Zhili
- Relations: Empress Xiaoxianchun (sister); Qianlong Emperor (brother-in-law); Yonglian (nephew); Princess Hejing (niece); Fuqing (brother); Consort Shu (sister-in-law); Yongxing (son-in-law); Princess Hejia (daughter-in-law); Mingliang (nephew); Mingrui (nephew)
- Children: Fulong'an; Fuk'anggan
- Clan: Fuca
- Posthumous name: Wenzhong (文忠)

Military service
- Allegiance: Qing dynasty
- Branch/service: Bordered Yellow Banner
- Years of service: 1740–1770
- Rank: General
- Battles/wars: First Jinchuan Campaign (1747–1749); Dzungar–Qing Wars (1755–1757); Sino-Burmese War (1768–1769)

Fuheng (Manchu: ᡶᡠᡥᡝᠩ, romanized: Fuheng; simplified Chinese: 傅恒; traditional Chinese: 傅恆; pinyin: Fùhéng; Burmese: ဖူဟင်း; 8 March 1722 – 2 September 1770), courtesy name Chunhe (春和), was a Qing dynasty official from the Fuca clan of the Manchu Bordered Yellow Banner, and was a younger brother of the Empress Xiaoxianchun. He served as a senior minister at the court of his brother-in-law, the Qianlong Emperor, from the 1750s to his death in 1770. He is best known for leading the Qing troops in the fourth and last invasion of Burma in the Sino-Burmese War.

Prior to his appointment as the commander-in-chief of the Burma campaign, Fuheng was chief grand councilor to the emperor, and one of the emperor's most trusted advisers. Fuheng was one of the few senior officials that fully backed the Qianlong Emperor's decision to eliminate the Dzungars in the 1750s when most at the court thought war was too risky. His nephew Mingrui led the Burma campaign of 1767–1768. His son Fuk'anggan was a senior general in the Qing military.

Fuheng was unsuccessful in the Burma campaign. In December 1769, he signed a truce with the Burmese, which the emperor did not accept. He died of malaria, which he contracted during his three-month invasion of Burma, when he got back to Beijing.

== Biography ==
=== Born into a distinguished family ===
Fuheng was born into a prestigious family. His ancestor Wangjinu (旺吉努) pledged allegiance to Nurhaci at the outset of his military campaigns, leading his clan in support. His great-grandfather Hashitu (哈什屯) served as a Grand Councillor during the reigns of the Taizong and Shizu emperors of the Qing dynasty, rising to the highest policy-making body of the Qing court. His grandfather Mingsihan earned the favor of the Kangxi Emperor and was promoted to Minister of Revenue and Grand Councillor. He firmly supported the Emperor’s proposal to abolish the regional feudal domains, contributing significantly to the restoration and development of social production and the suppression of the Revolt of the Three Feudatories during Kangxi’s reign. He was highly praised by the Emperor. Fuheng’s uncles Maska, Maqi, and Mawu were all prominent figures during the Kangxi and Yongzheng reigns. His father, Li Rongbao, held the post of Commander-in-Chief of Chahar. Fuheng’s elder sister was none other than Empress Xiaoxianchun.

=== Campaign against Jinchuan ===
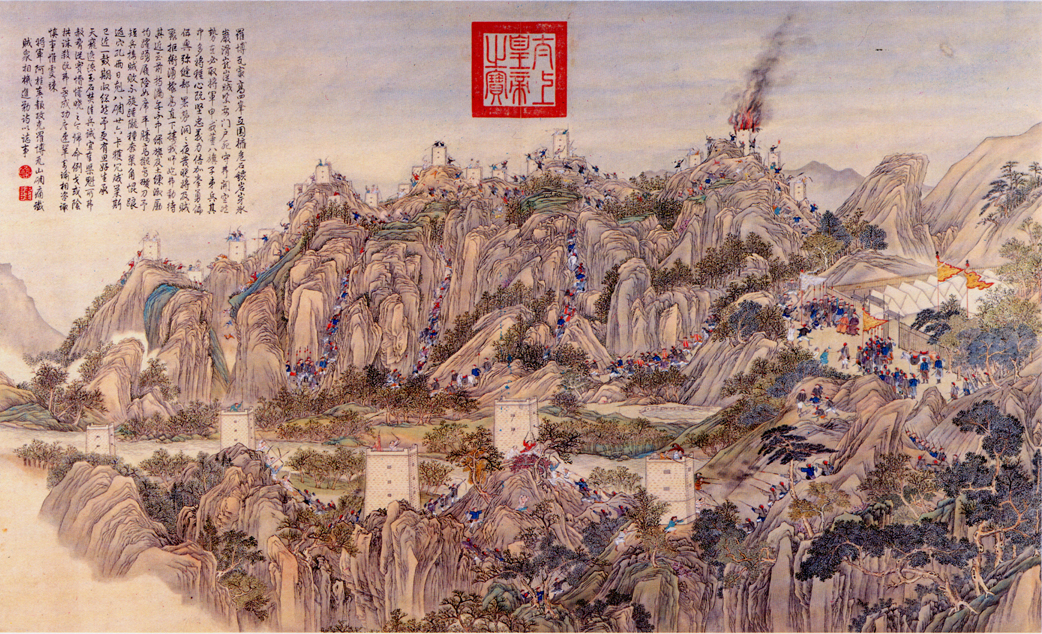
Conquest of fortresses in Jinchuan by Qing troops

At the time, the general Necin was leading the offensive against Jinchuan, but his efforts proved fruitless. In the ninth month, the Qianlong Emperor reassigned Fuheng to temporarily oversee the duties of the Governor-General of Sichuan and Shaanxi and to direct military operations. Shortly thereafter, he was appointed Grand Secretariat of the Hall of Preserving Harmony. Four million taels of silver were allocated from the Ministry of Revenue and various provincial treasuries for military expenses, and an additional 100,000 taels were drawn from the imperial treasury for rewards. In the eleventh month, Fuheng set out. The Emperor hosted a farewell banquet at the Chonghua Palace, personally performed ritual offerings at the Tangzi Hall, and ordered the imperial princes and Grand Secretary Lai Bao to escort him to Liangxiang.

Soon after, due to Fuheng’s swift march and strict discipline, the Emperor ordered a commendation and proposed promoting him to Grand Tutor to the Heir Apparent and further to Grand Guardian. Fuheng declined, but the Emperor refused to accept his refusal.

Previously, the tusi (native chieftain) of Lesser Jinchuan, Liang’erji, had feigned surrender and acted as a spy for Saruoben (莎羅奔). Zhang Guangsi, believing Wang Qiu, allowed Liang’erji to lead ethnic minority troops, and every movement by the Qing army was immediately known to the enemy. On his way, Fuheng submitted a memorial requesting the execution of Liang’erji and his associates. Upon nearing the front, he ordered Vice General Ma Liangzhu to summon Liang’erji under pretenses. When he arrived at Bangga Mountain, Liang’erji’s crimes were publicly denounced, and he was executed. The Qianlong Emperor praised Fuheng’s decisiveness and bestowed upon him the double-eyed peacock feather again, forbidding any refusal.

In December, Fuheng arrived at Kasa and moved the camp to the old fortress, ordering General Ye Daxiong to observe the Jinchuan fortifications. In 1749, Fuheng submitted a memorial analyzing the reasons for previous defeats and proposed a multi-pronged offensive strategy.

Although the Qianlong Emperor initially believed that Jinchuan was not a significant threat, upon learning of its formidable terrain, he ordered a withdrawal by imperial decree through Empress Dowager Xiaoshengxian. However, Fuheng was in the midst of capturing several fortresses with generals Ha Panlong and Ha Shangde. The Emperor, concerned about the harsh conditions, gifted Fuheng three catties of ginseng and repeatedly issued edicts recalling him. Nonetheless, in recognition of his merit, and on Empress Dowager Xiaoshengxian’s decree, Fuheng was ennobled as a First Class Duke Loyal and Brave, and was granted a bejeweled hat top and Four-Clawed Dragon Court Robe. Fuheng firmly opposed the withdrawal and declined the honors, but the Emperor refused to relent.

At this point, Fuheng and Commander-in-Chief Yue Zhongqi planned a deeper incursion. Saruoben sent emissaries to plead for surrender. Fuheng demanded Saruoben personally surrender, bound. Saruoben later dispatched Chuosijia and others to plead for mercy from Yue Zhongqi, who personally entered Leuwuwei and escorted Saruoben and his son Langka to Fuheng’s camp, where they formally surrendered. Saruoben offered a Buddha statue and ten thousand taels of silver; Fuheng declined the silver. Saruoben then requested to use the silver to build a shrine for Fuheng.

The next day, Fuheng led his troops back. The Qianlong Emperor issued a commendation edict, and following the precedent of Yangguli, awarded him two leopard-tail spears and two imperial bodyguards. In the third month, as the troops returned to the capital, the Emperor sent his eldest son Yonghuang and Prince Yu Guanglu to welcome him outside the city. Shortly afterward, the Emperor established an ancestral temple for the Fuca clan to honor Fuheng’s great-grandfather, grandfather, and father. He also granted Fuheng a mansion inside Dong’anmen.

=== Pacification of the Dzungars ===
In 1754, a civil war broke out among the Dzungar tribes. The Qianlong Emperor intended to launch a military campaign and sought the opinions of his ministers; only Fuheng supported the plan. In the twentieth year (1755), the Qing army captured Ili and took Dawachi prisoner. The Qianlong Emperor issued an edict promoting Fuheng once again to First-Class Duke. Fuheng submitted a memorial in firm refusal, weeping as he did so, and the Emperor finally consented. Not long afterward, the Emperor had portraits of one hundred meritorious officials displayed in the Ziguang Pavilion; Fuheng’s portrait was placed in the foremost position.

In 1756, General Celing was tasked with pursuing Amursana. The Qianlong Emperor ordered Fuheng to go out and inspect the army, traveling to Elinhabirga to assemble the Mongol taijis and oversee military organization. Shortly after Fuheng’s departure, a memorial arrived from Celing reporting that he had already led his troops deep into enemy territory. The Emperor then recalled Fuheng.

=== Campaign against Burma ===
In 1768, General Mingrui was defeated in his campaign against Burma. In the second month, the Qianlong Emperor appointed Fuheng as Imperial Commissioner to lead the expedition, with Arigūn and Agui as Deputy Generals, and Shuhede as Associate Minister, to continue the war against Burma.

In the following year, during the second lunar month, Fuheng set out with his troops and entered Yunnan in the third month. In the fourth month, he arrived at the border town Tengyue. Upon reaching the frontier, Fuheng observed that the area of Wengushan contained many towering trees, particularly Zhuangnan and Yehuai, which were ideal for shipbuilding. The nearby area of Niuniuba was cool and free of miasma, making it suitable for construction. He secretly ordered Fu Xian to lead 3,000 Qing troops and over 460 craftsmen from Huguang to begin building warships, while drafting a strategy to advance by both land and water directly toward the Burmese capital, Ava. The Qianlong Emperor highly approved of this plan.

In August 1769, Fuheng departed from Tengyue and launched a surprise attack on Burma, winning initial victories. By the October, the warships at Niuniuba were completed, and the Qing forces advanced by both land and water, routing the Burmese navy. In November, they captured the strategic military post of Xinjie, which had previously fallen to the Burmese. In the eleventh month, they attacked Laokuantun, a critical hub of north-south land and river traffic that was heavily fortified and difficult to capture. The Burmese had established strong wooden and river fortifications and fiercely resisted. The region was plagued by mist and high humidity, and the poor climate adversely affected the Qing troops, particularly the Manchu soldiers who were unaccustomed to such conditions. Many fell ill with tropical diseases.

Originally numbering over 31,000 in both land and naval forces, the Qing army suffered heavy losses, with more than half perishing. Several key commanders—including Grain Transport Commissioner Fu Xian, General Wu Shisheng, Deputy General Arigūn, Vice Commander Yong Rui, and Commanders Wufu and Ye Xiangde—died of illness. Fuheng himself contracted a serious disease and became gravely ill. Upon learning of this, the Qianlong Emperor ordered Agui to assume military command and instructed Fuheng to return immediately to the capital.

At the same time, the Burmese king and military leaders, fearing the might of the Qing army, expressed willingness to end the conflict. Seizing the opportunity, the Qianlong Emperor approved peace talks between the Qing forces and the Burmese.

== Family ==
Sons of Fuheng

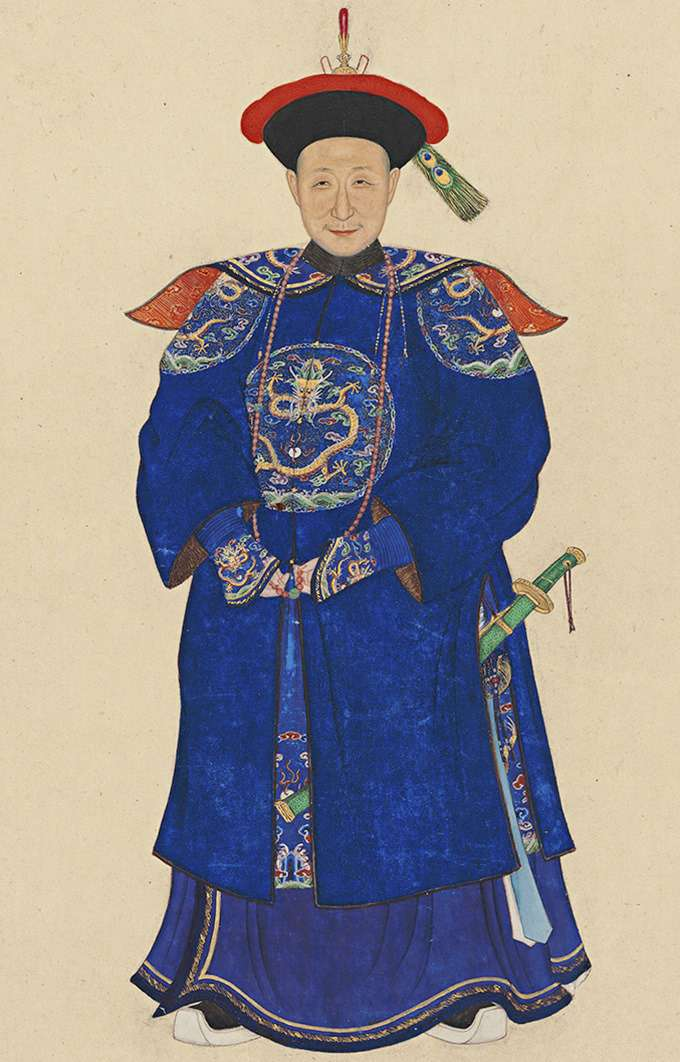
Fuk'anggan (1754–1796)

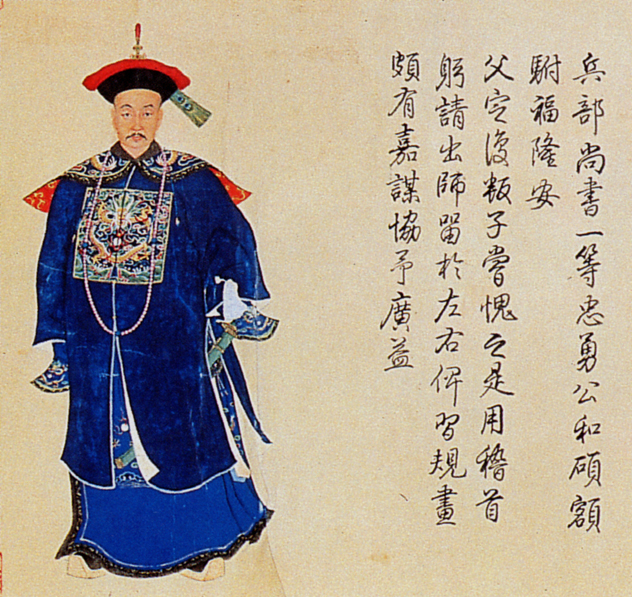
Fulong'an (1746–1784)

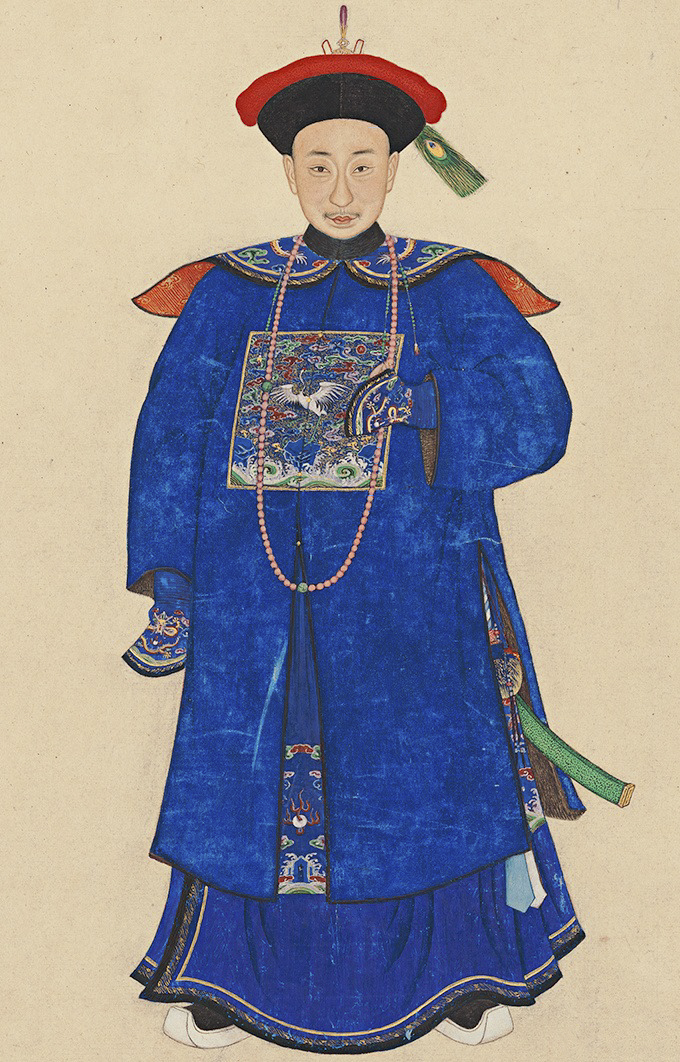
Fuchang'an (1760–1817)

- Consort, of the Yehe-Nara clan (福晋 葉赫那拉氏):
  - Fuling'an, Knight Commandant of the Cloud (雲騎尉 福靈安; ?–1767), 1st son
  - Fulong'an, Duke Zhongyong of the First Class (一等忠勇公 福隆安; 1746–1784), 2nd son; married Princess Hejia, the Qianlong Emperor's 4th daughter by Imperial Noble Consort Chunhui, and had issue (two sons)
  - Fuk'anggan, Prince Jiayong of the Second Rank (嘉勇郡王 福康安; 1753–1796), 3rd son
- Concubine, of the Li clan (李氏):
  - Fuchang'an, Marquis Chengjing (誠靖侯 福長安; 1760–1810), adopted son
- Concubine, of the Sugiya clan (孙佳氏)
- Unknown:
  - Lady Fuca (富察氏; ?–1813), 1st daughter
    - Married Yongxing, Prince Cheng, the Qianlong Emperor's 11th son by Imperial Noble Consort Shujia, and had issue (two sons, two daughters)
  - Lady Fuca (富察氏), 2nd daughter
    - Married Chunying, Prince Rui, and had issue (two sons)

== In fiction and popular culture ==
- Portrayed by Joseph Lee in Take Care, Your Highness! (1985)
- Portrayed by Hung Tak-sing in The Rise and Fall of Qing Dynasty (1988)
- Portrayed by Zhang Wei in My Fair Princess (1998)
- Portrayed by Yang Junyi in Li Wei Resigns from Office (2005)
- Portrayed by Xing Hanqing in New My Fair Princess (2011)
- Portrayed by Xu Kai in Story of Yanxi Palace (2018)
- Portrayed by Jia Tinglong in Ruyi's Royal Love in the Palace (2018)

== See also ==
- Ten Great Campaigns
- Sino-Burmese War (1765–1769)
