= Maci (politician) =

Chinese statesman (1652–1739)

Second Class Count Maci

Grand Secretary of the Baohe Hall
- In office 1723–1735

Grand Secretary of the Wuying Hall
- In office 1699–1709
- In office 1716–1723

Minister of Revenue
- In office 1692–1701 Serving with Wang Zhi (until 1694), Chen Tingjing (1694–1699), Li Zhenyu (since 1699)
- Preceded by: Xilena
- Succeeded by: Kaimbu

Minister of War
- In office 1691–1694 Serving with Du Zhen
- Preceded by: Giltabu
- Succeeded by: Suonuohe

Personal details
- Born: 1652
- Died: 1739 (aged 86–87)
- Parent: Mishan (father)

Military service
- Allegiance: Qing Dynasty
- Branch/service: Manchu Bordered Yellow Banner

Maci

Chinese name
- Traditional Chinese: 馬齊
- Simplified Chinese: 马齐
Transcriptions
Standard Mandarin
- Hanyu Pinyin: Mǎqí

Posthumous name
- Chinese: 文穆
Transcriptions
Standard Mandarin
- Hanyu Pinyin: Wénmù

Manchu name
- Manchu script: ᠮᠠᠴᡳ
- Romanization: maci

Maci (1652–1739) was a Manchu Bordered Yellow Banner court official who lived in the Qing dynasty. He was from the Fuca clan, and was the eldest son of Mishan (米思翰).

Maci served as Minister of War from 1691 to 1694, and Minister of Revenue from 1692 to 1701. He was also a member of the Grand Secretariat during Kangxi Emperor's reign, and was an important supporter of the 8th Prince Yinsi (Yunsi). In 1708, Maci, Tong Guowei (佟國維), Alingga (阿靈阿) and Olondai (鄂倫岱) proposed designating Yinsi as Crown Prince but was refused by the emperor. He was stripped of his official position and forced into house arrest.

Maci returned to politics after Yongzheng Emperor ascended the throne. He sat on the emperor's top advisory board along with Yunsi, Yunxiang, and Longkodo. He retired in 1735, and died in 1739.

Fuheng, Fucing were his nephews, and Empress Xiaoxianchun his niece. His son Fuliang (富良) used to serve as Xi'an (Manchu city) garrison general (西安將軍).
