= Miande =

Miande 綿德
- Prince of the Fourth Rank 固山貝子

Head of the House of Prince Ding peerage
- Tenure: 1750–1776
- Predecessor: Yonghuang
- Successor: Mian'en
- Born: 11 August 1747
- Died: 17 November 1786 (aged 39)
- Spouse: Lady Borjigit (博爾濟吉特氏); Lady Irgen Gioro (伊爾根覺羅氏)
- Issue: Yichun (奕純); Lady of the Second Rank
Names
- Aisin Gioro Miande (愛新覺羅·綿德)
- House: Aisin Gioro
- Father: Yonghuang
- Mother: Lady Ilari (伊拉里氏)

Miande (Chinese: 綿德; 11 August 1747 – 17 November 1786) was an imperial prince of the Qing dynasty of China. He was Yonghuang's eldest son and the Qianlong Emperor's grandson.

== Life ==
Miande was born on 11 August 1747 to lady Ilari, Yonghuang's princess consort. His father died in 1750 and was posthumously honoured as Prince Ding'an of the First Rank. Initially, Miande held a title of the first ranking prince. In 1752, he was demoted to the Prince of the Second Rank. In 1775, Miande took part in the funeral of Empress Xiaoyichun. In 1777, Miande arrived late at the funeral of Consort Shu and was forbidden from return to capital until the end of the mourning period. The prince was stripped of his title after it was revealed that he rewarded a fifth rank official Qin Xiong with a collection of precious calligraphy paintings. After the investigation led by Fuheng's son Fulong'an, Qin Xiong had been involved in hijacking Miande's horse. The scandal didn't disturb the repromotion to the Duke of the First Rank in the following year. His title was passed younger brother, Mian'en. In 1784, Miande was promoted to the Prince of the Fourth Rank. He died on 17 November 1786 and was succeeded by his son Yichun. His descendants became a minor clansmen in comparison to the descendants of his brother, who inherited the peerage as high-ranking princes.

== Family ==
Miande was married to Lady Borjigit, eldest daughter of Princess Hejing of the First Rank and leader of Khorchin Mongols Septeng Baljur. In 1766, he married lady Irgen Gioro as a primary consort.

- Primary consort, of the Khorchin Borjigin clan (嫡福晋博尔济吉特氏; d. 1763)
  郡王嫡福晋
- Primary consort, of the Irgen Gioro clan (1766–1786)
  郡王继福晋-->奉恩镇国公夫人-->贝子夫人
  - Prince of the Fourth Rank Yichun (1767-1816), first son
  - Lady of the Second Rank
