= Mian'en =

- Prince Ding of the First Rank 和碩定親王

Head of the House of Prince Ding peerage
- Tenure: 1776–1822
- Predecessor: Miande
- Successor: Yishao (奕紹)
- Born: 18 September 1747
- Died: 18 July 1822 (aged 74)
- Spouse: Lady Fuca (富察氏)
- Issue: Yishao; Yizhi
Names
- Mian'en (綿恩)
Posthumous name
- Prince Dinggong of the First Rank (定恭親王)
- House: Aisin Gioro
- Father: Yonghuang
- Mother: Lady Irgen Gioro (伊爾根覺羅氏)

Mian'en (Chinese: 綿恩; 18 September 1747 – 18 July 1822), posthumous name Prince Dinggong of the First Rank, was an imperial prince of China's Qing dynasty. He was the second son of Yonghuang and a grandson of the Qianlong Emperor.

== Life ==
Mian'en was born on 18 September 1747 to lady Irgen Gioro, Yonghuang's secondary consort. Mian'en showed high potential in martial arts in the childhood, thus was favoured by the Qianlong Emperor. In 1755, he received a yellow horse-riding jacket at the age of eight. According to the relation of Choson Korean ambassadors, Mian'en had more abilities than his younger uncle, Yongyan. According to the relations of Prince Li, Zhaolian, Mian'en was a specialist in weapons at the age of 50.

He inherited the peerage as the Prince of the Second Rank after the demotion of Miande in 1776. In 1793, he was promoted to the Prince of the First Rank, thus became the earliest promoted imperial grandson. In 1799, Mian'en was one of the initiators of the general control of Heshen's property after the official was denounced. Heshen's relatives contradicted him by defending official's deeds. In 1803, Mian'en gave approval to imperial guards on the Gate of Divine Prowess. His son was granted a title of the fourth-ranking prince shortly after the incident. Mian'en died on 18 July 1822 and was granted posthumous title of Prince Dinggong of the First Rank (定恭亲王， meaning "stable and reverent").

== Family ==
Mian'en's primary princess consort was lady Fuca, daughter of vice-colonel Fujing.

- Primary consort, of the Fuca clan（定恭亲王嫡福晋 富察氏)
  定郡王嫡福晋→定亲王嫡福晋
  - Princess of the First Rank
    - Married Manzhu Bazar (满珠巴咱尔) of the Kharchin league in 1785
- Secondary consort, of the Yougiya clan (侧福晋 尤佳氏；d. 1865)
  定郡王次福晋→定郡王侧福晋→定亲王侧福晋
  - First son
  - Yishao, Prince Dingduan of the First Rank (定端亲王 奕绍; 26 June 1776 – 28 November 1836 ), second son
  - Third son
- Secondary consort, of the Li clan （侧福晋李氏)
  定郡王侧福晋→定亲王侧福晋
  - Yizhi (奕𥾣), fourth son
- Secondary consort, of the Wanyan clan （侧福晋完颜氏)
  定郡王侧福晋→定亲王侧福晋
