= Imperial Noble Consort Zhemin =

Consort of the Qianlong Emperor

- Died: 20 August 1735 (雍正十三年 七月 三日)
- Burial: Yu Mausoleum, Eastern Qing tombs
- Spouse: Qianlong Emperor (before 1735)
- Issue: Yonghuang, Prince Ding'an of the First Rank; Second daughter
Posthumous name
- Imperial Noble Consort Zhemin (哲憫皇貴妃)
- House: Fuca (富察; by birth); Aisin Gioro (by marriage)

Imperial Noble Consort Zhemin
- Traditional Chinese: 哲憫皇貴妃
- Simplified Chinese: 哲悯皇贵妃
Transcriptions
Standard Mandarin
- Hanyu Pinyin: Zhémǐn Huángguìfēi

Imperial Noble Consort Zhemin (died 20 August 1735), of the Manchu Plain Yellow Banner Fuca clan, was a consort of the Qianlong Emperor of the Qing dynasty.

== Life ==
=== Family background ===
Imperial Noble Consort Zhemin's personal name was not recorded in history. She was a member of the Plain Yellow Banner Fuca clan by birth.

- Father: Wengguotu (翁果圖), served as a fourth rank military official (佐領)
- One sister: Wife of Gioro Yongqing (永清)

=== Yongzheng era ===
It is not known when Lady Fuca became a lady-in-waiting of Hongli, the Yongzheng Emperor's fourth son. In 1725, she became his mistress. She gave birth on 5 July 1728 to his first son, Yonghuang, and in May or June 1731 to his second daughter, who would die prematurely in December 1731 or January 1732. Lady Fuca died on 20 August 1735.

=== Qianlong era ===
The Yongzheng Emperor died on 8 October 1735 and was succeeded by Hongli, who was enthroned as the Qianlong Emperor. In November or December 1736, the Qianlong Emperor granted Lady Fuca the posthumous title "Consort Zhe". In May 1745, she was posthumously elevated to "Imperial Noble Consort Zhemin" by virtue of her son being the emperor's first son. In 1752, she was interred in the Yu Mausoleum of the Eastern Qing tombs.

== Titles ==
- During the reign of the Kangxi Emperor (r. 1661–1722):
  - Lady Fuca
- During the reign of the Yongzheng Emperor (r. 1722–1735):
  - Mistress (from 1725)
- During the reign of the Qianlong Emperor (r. 1735–1796):
  - Consort Zhe (哲妃; from November/December 1736), fourth rank consort
  - Imperial Noble Consort (皇貴妃; from 24 February 1745), second rank consort
  - Imperial Noble Consort Zhemin (哲憫皇貴妃; from May 1745)

== Issue ==
- As a mistress:
  - Yonghuang (永璜; 5 July 1728 – 21 April 1750), the Qianlong Emperor's first son, posthumously honoured as Prince Ding'an of the First Rank
  - The Qianlong Emperor's second daughter (1 June 1731 – 6 January 1732)

== See also ==
- Ranks of imperial consorts in China#Qing
- Royal and noble ranks of the Qing dynasty
