= Li Wei Resigns from Office =

- Taiwan DVD cover
- Also known as: The Resignation of Li Wei; Li Wei's Resignation
- Traditional Chinese: 李衛辭官
- Simplified Chinese: 李卫辞官
- Hanyu Pinyin: Lǐ Wèi Cí Guān
- Genre: Historical drama Comedy
- Written by: Yuyue
- Directed by: Kuk Kwok Leung
- Starring: Paul Chun; Yu Bo; Cheng Pei-pei; Deric Wan
- Theme music composer: Xu Jialiang
- Opening theme: “I Laugh Free and Unfettered"
- Ending theme: "Yesterday's Tomorrow"
- Country of origin: China
- Original language: Mandarin
- No. of seasons: 1
- No. of episodes: 42

Related
- Li Wei the Magistrate

Li Wei Resigns from Office (Chinese: 李衛辭官; pinyin: Lǐ Wèi Cí Guān) is a 2005 Chinese television historical comedy drama and the third installment in the Li Wei series. It was directed by Kuk Kwok Leung and written by Yuyue, the series' original writer. It ran for a single season and totaled forty-two episodes.

Set many years after the events of the second installment, Li Wei Resigns from Office depicts fictionalized events in the life of Qing magistrate Li Wei during the early reign of the Qianlong Emperor as Li attempts to resign from the Qing court. Unfortunately, he is continuously impeded by its affairs which force him to continue his reluctant servitude to the young emperor. As a result of the time shift, the main cast from the previous series were replaced by older actors in addition to new characters, including Li's son Xiaowei, being introduced. Veteran Hong Kong actors Paul Chun and Cheng Pei-pei star respectively as an older Li and as Li's mother.

== Plot overview ==
The series consists of five overarching plots, the first beginning in 1735 following the death of the Yongzheng Emperor and his succession by his fourth son, the Qianlong Emperor. Li Wei, aged, widowed, and having served two generations of emperors, submits his resignation which is at first willed by the new emperor, who thoroughly dislikes him. However, news reaches the Forbidden City of a violent murder that took place in which a magistrate named Hai and most of his family and retainers were massacred. His daughter, Haiju, remains the sole survivor while a small jade lion belonging to the late emperor's half-brother and political rival is found at the murder scene, hinting at the true identities of the murderers. Li becomes involved and a potential target when his son, Xiaowei, brings Haiju to his estate seeking refuge.

Later, Li is promised his retirement after he is to investigate a county yamen whereupon he uncovers a dark and complex system of corruption, bribery, and crime amongst its members. The Qianlong Emperor himself is eventually compelled to investigate. Under the guise of an entrepreneur named Tan, he befriends an unaware Xiaowei and witnesses the true extent the corruption of his magistrates have spread. Li Wei and the Qianlong Emperor manage to trace the person at the heart of the decadence, but things are further complicated when they are handed an account book revealing more than half of all the magistrates in the empire have taken bribes, including Li himself.

Xiaowei learns of Tan's true identity and is made a guard at the imperial palace. In an attempt to curry favor, he brings the emperor a group of songstresses, resulting in the latter neglecting his duties and drawing the ire of Empress Xiaoxianchun, who orders them killed. Things worsen when Xiaowei hides the women at his father's estate, causing several misunderstandings to arise. At court, Li Wei wrongfully criticizes the emperor's chief grand councilor and brother-in-law Fuheng as having procured the performers, resulting in the empress and her father plotting to take down Fuheng and his sister, Consort Fu, whom they see as their greatest political threats.

Li Wei eventually helps reveal the ploy and is rewarded with a villa while he is tasked in overseeing the capture and sentencing of any remaining supporters. Strange events begin happening at the villa causing Li's family to believe the place is haunted, a belief further reinforced when they learn it previously belonged to a Ming-loyalist who was executed by the Yongzheng Emperor.

The final arc chronicles the Qianlong Emperor pursuing a sacred jewel for his mother, Empress Dowager Chongqing. For Li Wei, though, his resignation seems assured until he is entrusted with procuring a replacement. Meanwhile, Qing general Ke Le Er, seeing this as a chance to gain favor, steals an indigenous treasure from a Tibetan tribe, intending on presenting it to the emperor and empress dowager. The tribe members happen to hear of Li Wei's task and, mistaking him to be the thief, kidnap Xiaowei as ransom.

== Cast ==
- Paul Chun as Li Wei
- Yu Bo as the Qianlong Emperor
- Cheng Pei-pei as Li Wei's mother
- Deric Wan as Li Xiaowei
- Xie Fang as Empress Dowager Chongqing
- Yang Junyi as Fuheng
- Hu Xiaoting as Shiliu
- Hao Bojie as Yue Xiaoman
- Yang Guang as Empress Xiaoxianchun
- Li Yanbing as Haiju
- Wu Jiahui as Liu Bao
- Tong Xiaohu as chief eunuch Wang Pu
- Liu Sitong as Consort Fu

== Filming ==
Filming began in Jinzhong, Shanxi in October 2004. It was first broadcast in Taiwan on China Television in November 2005.

== Reception ==
The show was positively received. On Douban, it holds an audience score of 8.5 and is the highest rated of the series.
