= Imperial Noble Consort Chunhui =

Consort of Chinese Emperor

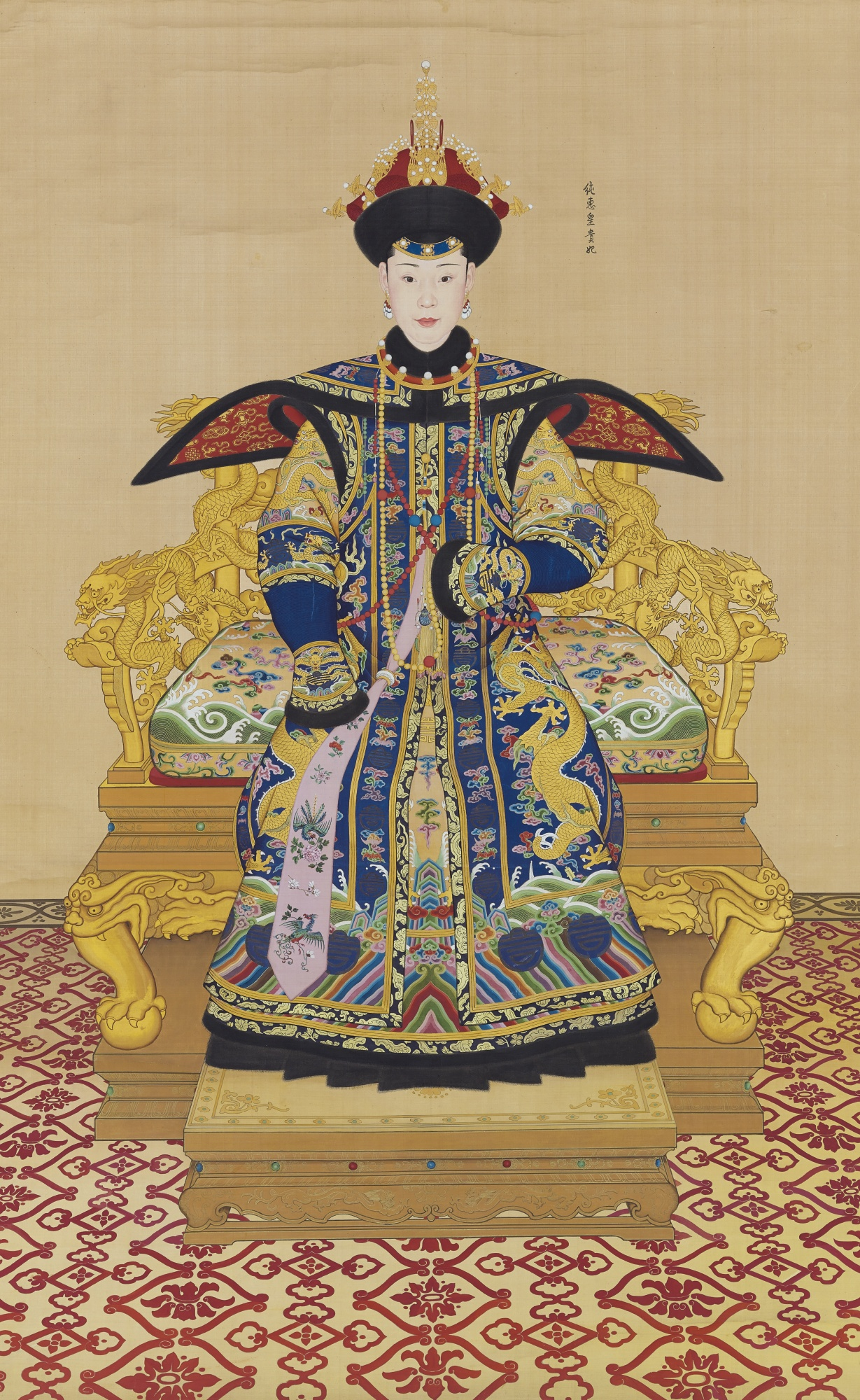
- Born: 13 June 1713 (康熙五十二年 五月 二十一日)
- Died: 2 June 1760 (aged 46) (乾隆二十五年 四月 十九日); Forbidden City
- Burial: Yu Mausoleum, Eastern Qing tombs
- Spouse: Qianlong Emperor (before 1760)
- Issue: Yongzhang, Prince Xun of the Second Rank; Yongrong, Prince Zhizhuang of the First Rank; Princess Hejia of the Second Rank
Posthumous name
- Imperial Noble Consort Chunhui (純惠皇貴妃)
- House: Su (蘇氏; by birth); Aisin Gioro (by marriage)
- Father: Su Zhaonan

Imperial Noble Consort Chunhui
- Traditional Chinese: 純惠皇貴妃
- Simplified Chinese: 纯惠皇贵妃
Transcriptions
Standard Mandarin
- Hanyu Pinyin: Chúnhuì Huángguìfēi

Imperial Noble Consort Chunhui (13 June 1713 – 2 June 1760), of the Su clan of Han ethnicity from the Plain White Banner, was a consort of the Qianlong Emperor of the Qing dynasty. She was two years his junior.

== Life ==
Imperial Noble Consort Chunhui's personal name was not recorded in history. Her father was Zhaonan (召南). Lady Su was born on the 21st day of the fifth lunar month in the 52nd year of the reign of the Kangxi Emperor, which translates to 13 June 1713 in the Gregorian calendar. She grew up in Suzhou.

It is not known when Lady Su was gifted to the Yongzheng Emperor by local government officials, but Yongzheng decided to give her as a concubine to his fourth son, Hongli. On 15 July 1735, she gave birth to his third son, Yongzhang.

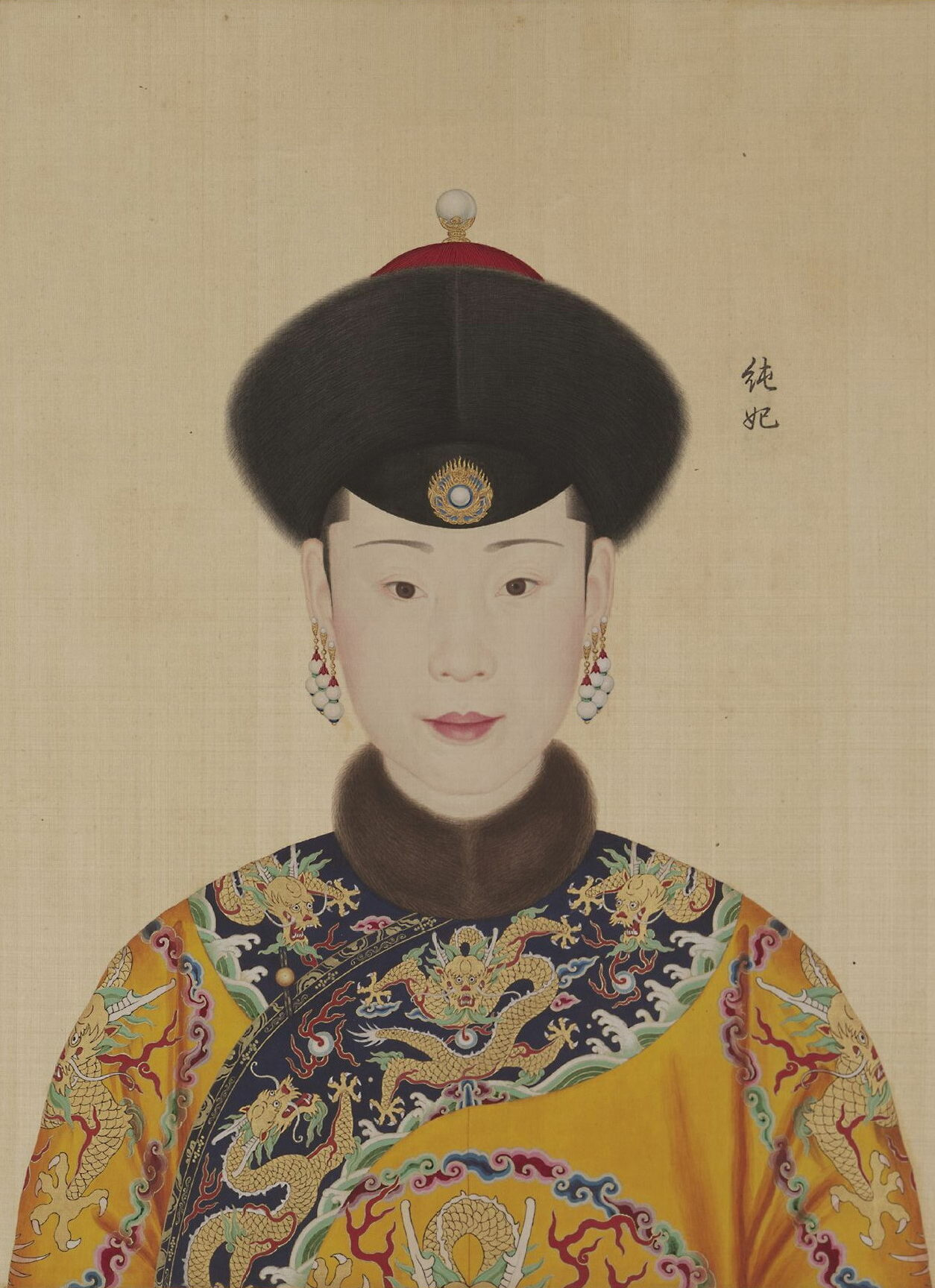
Part of the painting "Qianlong Emperor and his consorts", featuring Consort Chun

The Yongzheng Emperor died on 8 October 1735 and was succeeded by Hongli, who was enthroned as the Qianlong Emperor. On 8 November 1735, Lady Su was granted the title of "Concubine Chun". On 23 January 1738, she was elevated to "Consort Chun", making her the fourth highest ranking consort of the emperor, behind Consort Xian, the Noble Consort, and the Empress. On 28 January 1744, she gave birth to the emperor's sixth son, Yongrong.

On 9 December 1745, Consort Chun was elevated to the rank of "Noble Consort" alongside Consort Xian. This was the first time in the dynasty that there were two noble consorts at the same time. On 24 December 1745, she gave birth to the emperor's fourth daughter, Princess Hejia of the Second Rank. Noble Consort Chun became really ill, on 25 May 1760, she was elevated to "Imperial Noble Consort".

Lady Su died on 2 June 1760 and was granted the posthumous title of "Imperial Noble Consort Chunhui". On 16 December 1762, she was interred in the Yu Mausoleum of the Eastern Qing tombs.

== Error in name ==
The 20th-century historical text Draft History of Qing incorrectly recorded Imperial Noble Consort Chunhui's family name as "Sugiya" (蘇佳). While some Qing dynasty imperial consorts who were of Han Chinese origin changed their family names to Manchu-sounding names after marrying the emperors, Imperial Noble Consort Chunhui never changed hers. This was because she came from a commoner background, and her family was hence not eligible to be placed under a Manchu banner.

== Titles ==
- During the reign of the Kangxi Emperor (r. 1661–1722):
  - Lady Su (蘇氏; from 13 June 1713)
- During the reign of the Yongzheng Emperor (r. 1722–1735):
  - Mistress (格格; date unknown)
- During the reign of the Qianlong Emperor (r. 1735–1796):
  - Concubine Chun (純嬪; from 8 November 1735), fifth rank consort
  - Consort Chun (純妃; from 23 January 1738), fourth rank consort
  - Noble Consort Chun (純貴妃; from 9 December 1745), third rank consort
  - Imperial Noble Consort (皇貴妃; from 25 May 1760), second rank consort
  - Imperial Noble Consort Chunhui (純惠皇貴妃; from June/July 1760)

== Issue ==
- As Mistress:
  - Yongzhang (永璋; 15 July 1735 – 26 August 1760), Prince Xun of the Second Rank (循郡王), the Qianlong Emperor's third son
- As Consort Chun:
  - Yongrong (永瑢; 28 January 1744 – 13 June 1790), Prince Zhizhuang of the First Rank (質莊親王), the Qianlong Emperor's sixth son
- As Noble Consort Chun:
  - Princess Hejia of the Second Rank (和碩和嘉公主; 24 December 1745 – 29 October 1767), the Qianlong Emperor's fourth daughter
    - Married Fulong'an (福隆安; 1746–1784), of the Manchu Fuca clan on 10 May 1760

== In fiction and popular culture ==
- Portrayed by Wang Yuanke in Story of Yanxi Palace (2018).
- Portrayed by Hu Ke in Ruyi's Royal Love in the Palace (2018).

== See also ==
- Imperial Chinese harem system § Qing
- Royal and noble ranks of the Qing dynasty
