= Princess Hejia =

Qing dynasty princess (1745–1767)

Princess Hejia of the Second Rank
- Born: 24 December 1745; Jingren Palace, Forbidden City, Beijing
- Died: 29 October 1767 (aged 21); Beijing
- Spouse: Fulong'an (m. 1760)
- Issue: Fengshenjilun; Fengshenguolemin
- House: Aisin Gioro (by birth); Fuca (by marriage)
- Father: Qianlong Emperor
- Mother: Imperial Noble Consort Chunhui

Princess Hejia
- Traditional Chinese: 和碩和嘉公主
- Simplified Chinese: 和硕和嘉公主
Transcriptions
Standard Mandarin
- Hanyu Pinyin: Héshuò Héjiā Gōngzhǔ

Princess Hejia of the Second Rank (和碩和嘉公主; 24 December 1745 – 29 October 1767) was a Chinese princess of the Qing dynasty. She was the fourth daughter of Qianlong Emperor born by his concubine, Imperial Noble Consort Chunhui.

== Life ==
Princess Hejia of the Second Rank was born on 24 December 1745 (recorded as the second day of the twelfth month of the tenth year of Emperor Qianlong's reign) at the Palace of Great Benevolence (景仁宫; Jǐngréngōng) in the Forbidden City to the then-Noble Consort Chun (純貴妃). The following year, two of the Noble Consort's midwives, Madam Wang and Madam Xu, would also deliver Empress Xiaoxianchun's last child, the short-lived Prince Yongcong.

On March 25, 1760, Princess Hejia married Fulong'an (福隆安), son of Fuheng. In addition to the standard dowry of 10,000 taels, the emperor awarded her another 10,000 more.

In the 28th year of Qianlong (1763), on August 23, Princess Hejia gave birth to her first child, a son, named Fengshenjilun (丰神吉伦). The date of the birth of her second son, named Fengshenguolemin (丰神果勒敏) is not known, but it's likely to be from 1764 onwards.

She became seriously ill and died on 29 October 1767 at the age of twenty-one, leaving Qianlong devasted. She was buried with all honors in an exquisitely made tomb.
