= Prince Ding =

Qing dynasty princely peerage

Prince Ding of the First Rank

Chinese name
- Traditional Chinese: 和碩定親王
- Simplified Chinese: 和硕定亲王
Transcriptions
Standard Mandarin
- Hanyu Pinyin: héshuò dìng qīnwáng
- Wade–Giles: ho-shuo ting ch'in-wang

Manchu name
- Manchu script: ᡥᠣᡧᠣᡳ ᡨᠣᡴᡨᠣᠨ ᠴᡳᠨ ᠸᠠᠩ
- Romanization: hošoi tokton cin wang

Prince Ding of the First Rank, or simply Prince Ding, was the title of a princely peerage used in China during the Manchu-led Qing dynasty (1644–1912). As the Prince Ding peerage was not awarded "iron-cap" status, this meant that each successive bearer of the title would normally start off with a title downgraded by one rank vis-à-vis that held by his predecessor. However, the title would generally not be downgraded to any lower than a feng'en fuguo gong except under special circumstances.

The first bearer of the title was Yonghuang (1728–1750), the Qianlong Emperor's eldest son, who received the title posthumously in 1750. The title was passed down over seven generations and held by eight persons.

== Members of the Prince Ding peerage ==
- Yonghuang (1728–1750), the Qianlong Emperor's eldest son, posthumously honoured as Prince Ding'an of the First Rank (定安親王) in 1750
  - Miande (綿德; 1747–1786), Yonghuang's eldest son, initially a qinwang, demoted to junwang in 1752, stripped of his title in 1776, restored as a feng'en zhenguo gong in 1777, promoted to beizi in 1784
    - Yichun (奕純; 1767–1816), Miande's eldest son, initially a third class fuguo jiangjun, promoted to feng'en zhenguo gong and then to beizi from 1786 to 1816
      - Zaixi (載錫), Yichun's eldest son, initially a third class fuguo jiangjun from 1799 to 1809, promoted to feng'en zhenguo gong in 1809, promoted to beizi in 1816
        - Puxi (溥喜), Zaixi's second son, initially a feng'en zhenguo gong, demoted to buru bafen fuguo gong in 1832, stripped of his title in 1838
        - Puji (溥吉), Zaixi's third son, held the title of a third class zhenguo jiangjun from 1825 to 1838, promoted to feng'en fuguo gong in 1838, had no male heir
      - Zaiming (載銘; 1795–1840), Yichun's third son, held the title of a third class fuguo jiangjun from 1816 to 1840
        - Puxian (溥咸), Zaiming's second son, held the title of a third class fengguo jiangjun from 1843 to 1866, promoted to buru bafen fuguo gong in 1866
          - Yuhou (毓厚), Puxian's eldest son, held the title of a buru bafen fuguo gong from 1868 to 1890, had no male heir
          - Yuxiang (毓祥), Puhe's third son, held the title of a buru bafen fuguo gong from 1891 to 1926
  - Mian'en (綿恩; 1747–1822), Yonghuang's second son, initially a junwang, promoted to qinwang in 1793, posthumously honoured as Prince Dinggong of the First Rank (定恭親王)
    - Yishao (奕紹; 1776–1836), Mian'en's second son, held the title of a buru bafen fuguo gong from 1799 to 1803, promoted to feng'en fuguo gong in 1803, promoted to beizi in 1804, promoted to beile in 1819, succeeded his father as Prince Ding of the First Rank in 1822, posthumously honoured as Prince Dingduan of the First Rank (定端親王)
      - Zaiquan (載銓; 1794–1854), Yishao's eldest son, initially a second class fuguo jiangjun, promoted to second class zhenguo jiangjun in 1823, promoted to buru bafen zhenguo gong in 1831, promoted to feng'en fuguo gong in 1835, held the title of a junwang from 1836 to 1854, posthumously promoted to qinwang and honoured as Prince Dingmin of the First Rank (定敏親王)
        - Puxu (溥煦; 1831–1907), Zaiming's fifth son and Zaiquan's successor, held the title of a junwang from 1854 to 1907, posthumously honoured as Prince Dingshen of the Second Rank (定慎郡王)
          - Yuchang (毓長; 1851–1903), Puxu's eldest son, held the title of a zhenguo jiangjun from 1872 to 1903
            - Hengqi (恆圻; 1887–1956), Yuchang's fifth son, held the title of a fuguo jiangjun from 1903 to 1945
              - Qizu (啟族; 1915–2002), Hengqi's son, adopted the name "Jin Yi'an", calligrapher and poet
              - Qikai (啟凱; 1925–?), Hengqi's son
          - Yulang (毓朗; 1864–1922), Puxu's second son, initially a third class zhenguo jiangjun, held the title of a beile from 1907 to 1922, posthumously honoured as Minda Beile (敏達貝勒)
            - Hengbo (恆馞; 1907–1956), Yulang's second son, held the title of a beizi from 1922 to 1945
              - Qixing (啟星; 1927–1971), Hengbo's son
          - Yuying (毓盈; 1881–1922), Puxu's fourth son, held the title of a third class zhenguo jiangjun from 1903
            - Henglan (恆蘭), Yuying's eldest son, held the title of a fuguo jiangjun

== Family tree ==
adoption
Yonghuang 永璜 (1728–1750); Prince Ding'an of the First Rank 定安親王 (posthumously awarded)
Miande 綿德 (1747–1786); Beizi 貝子 (1784–1786)	Mian'en 綿恩 (1747–1822); Prince Dinggong of the First Rank 定恭親王 (1793–1822)
Yichun 奕純 (1767–1816); Beizi 貝子 (1786–1816)	Yishao 奕紹 (1776–1836); Prince Dingduan of the First Rank 定端親王 (1822–1836)
Zaiming 載銘 (1795–1840); Third Class; Fuguo Jiangjun 三等輔國將軍 (1816–1840)	Zaiquan 載銓 (1794–1854); Prince Dingmin of the First Rank 定敏親王 (posthumously awarded)
Puxu 溥煦 (1831–1907); Prince Dingshen of the Second Rank 定慎郡王 (1854–1907)
Yuchang 毓長 (1851–1903); Zhenguo Jiangjun 鎮國將軍 (1872–1903)	Yulang 毓朗 (1864–1922); Minda Beile 敏達貝勒 (1907–1922)
Hengqi 恆圻 (1887–1956); Fuguo Jiangjun 輔國將軍 (1903–1945)	Hengbo 恆馞 (1907–1956); Beizi 貝子 (1922–1945)
Qizu 啟族 (1915–2002)	Qikai 啟凱 (1925–?)	Qixing 啟星 (1927–1971)

== See also ==
- Royal and noble ranks of the Qing dynasty
