= Consort Shu (Qianlong) =

Consort of the Qianlong Emperor (1728–1777)

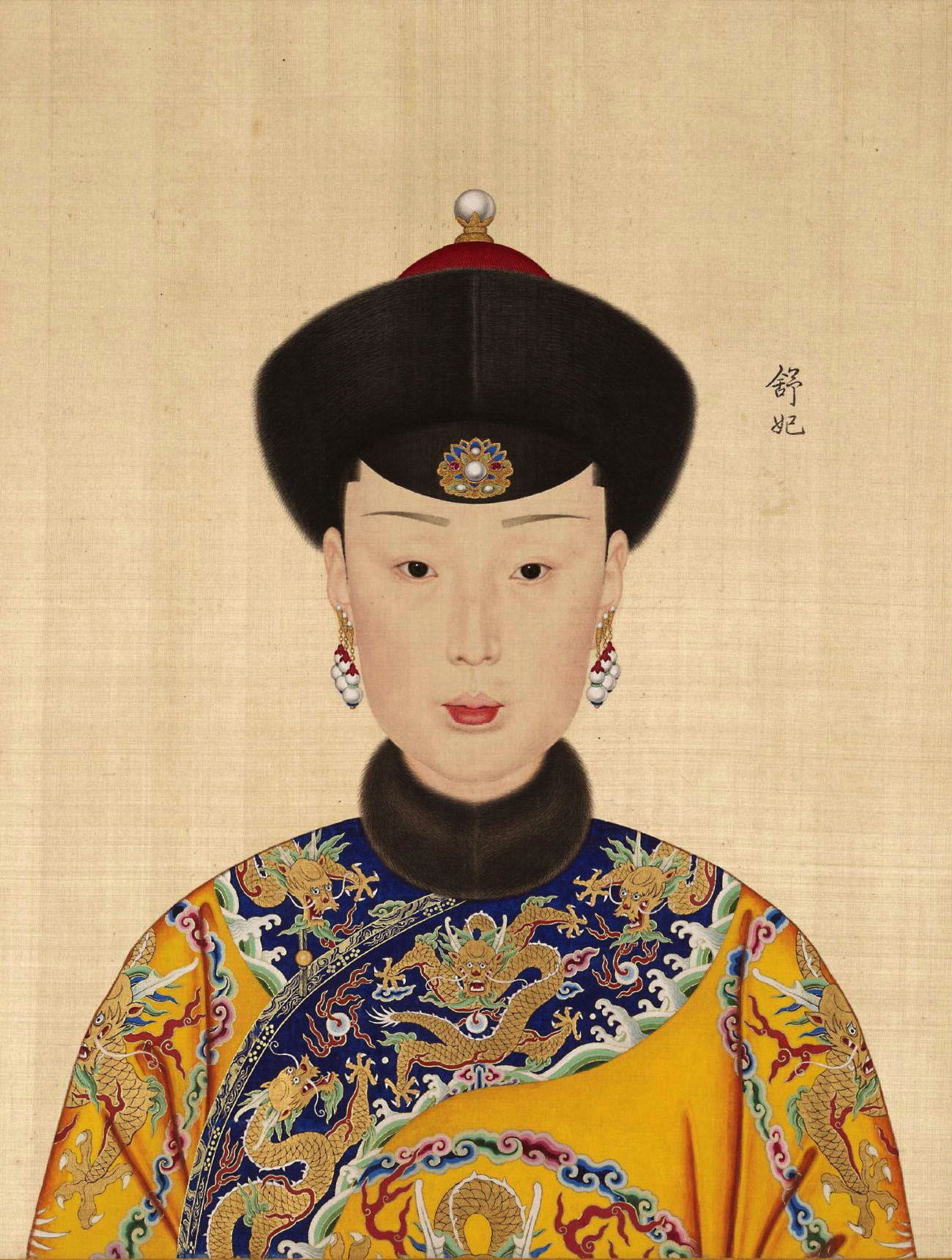
- Qing Dynasty portrait of Consort Shu
- Born: 7 July 1728 (雍正六年 六月 一日)
- Died: 4 July 1777 (aged 48) (乾隆四十二年 五月 三十日); Forbidden City
- Burial: Yu Mausoleum, Eastern Qing tombs
- Spouse: Qianlong Emperor (m. 1741–1777)
- Issue: Yongyue
- House: Yehe Nara (葉赫那拉; by birth); Aisin Gioro (by marriage)

Consort Shu
- Traditional Chinese: 舒妃
- Simplified Chinese: 舒妃
Transcriptions
Standard Mandarin
- Hanyu Pinyin: Shū Fēi

Consort Shu (7 July 1728 – 4 July 1777), of the Manchu Plain Yellow Banner Yehe Nara clan, was a consort of the Qianlong Emperor. She was 17 years younger than him.

== Life ==
=== Family background ===
Consort Shu's personal name was not recorded in history.

- Father: Yongshou (永壽; 1702–1731), served as the Right Vice Minister of War from 1727–1729
  - Paternal grandfather: Kuifang (揆方; 1679–1707), held the title of prince consort (額駙), Mingju's third son
  - Paternal grandmother: Aisin-Gioro Shushen (淑慎; 1681–1706), held the title of third rank princess (郡主), Giyesu's eighth daughter
- Mother: Gūwalgiya Sibai (思柏)
  - Maternal grandfather: Hantai (含太)
- One brother
- Three elder sisters
  - First elder sister: wife of Fuheng, of the Fuca clan
  - Second elder sister: Primary Consort Li of the First Rank, wife of Yongkui, of the Aisin-Gioro clan

=== Yongzheng era ===
The future Consort Shu was born on the first day of the sixth lunar month in the sixth year of the reign of the Yongzheng Emperor, which translates to 7 July 1728 in the Gregorian calendar.

=== Qianlong era ===
On 23 March 1741, Lady Yehe Nara entered the Forbidden City and was granted the title "Noble Lady" by the Qianlong Emperor. She was elevated in December 1741 or January 1742 to "Concubine Shu", and on 20 May 1749 to "Consort Shu". On 12 June 1751, she gave birth to Yongyue, the emperor's tenth son, who would die prematurely on Lady Yehe Nara's twenty-fifth birthday on 7 July 1753. Lady Yehe Nara died on 4 July 1777 and was interred in the Yu Mausoleum of the Eastern Qing tombs.

== Titles ==
- During the reign of the Yongzheng Emperor (r. 1722–1735):
  - Lady Yehe Nara (from 7 July 1728)
- During the reign of the Qianlong Emperor (r. 1735–1796):
  - Noble Lady (貴人; from 23 March 1741), sixth rank consort
  - Concubine Shu (舒嬪; from December 1741 or January 1742), fifth rank consort
  - Consort Shu (舒妃; from 20 May 1749), fourth rank consort

== Issue ==
- As Consort Shu:
  - Yongyue (永玥;12 June 1751 – 7 July 1753), The Qianlong Emperor's tenth son

== In fiction and popular culture ==
- Portrayed by Akina Hong in Happy Ever After (1999)
- Portrayed by Li Chun'ai in Story of Yanxi Palace (2018)
- Portrayed by Chen Haoyu in Ruyi's Royal Love in the Palace (2018)

== See also ==
- Ranks of imperial consorts in China § Qing
- Royal and noble ranks of the Qing dynasty
- Yehe Nara clan
