= Princess Hejing (born 1731) =

Qing dynasty princess

Princess Hejing of the First Rank 固伦和敬公主
- Princess Hejing is standing next to the pillar to the right
- Born: 31 July 1731; Prince Bao's Mansion, Beijing
- Died: 30 September 1792 (aged 61)
- Burial: Cháoyáng Shì, Liaoning, China
- Spouse: Septeng Baljur
- Issue: Eleke Temur Babai; Four daughters
- House: Aisin-Gioro (by birth); Khorchin Borjigin (by marriage)
- Father: Qianlong Emperor
- Mother: Empress Xiaoxianchun
- Religion: Vajrayana Buddhism

Princess Hejing of the First Rank (固倫和敬公主; 31 July 1731 – 30 September 1792), was a princess of the Qing dynasty as the third daughter of the Qianlong Emperor and second by Empress Xiaoxianchun.

In 1735, she was granted the title of Princess Hejing of the First Rank and married her to Septeng Baljur in 1747, a nobleman of the Khorchin Borjigit clan. According to Manchu Qing regulations, princesses were not to live with their parents after marriage. Emperor Qianlong, unwilling to see the princess marry far away, made an exception and allowed her to remain in the capital, ordering the Imperial Household Department to select a site in Beijing for the princess and her husband to build a princess's residence.

== Life ==
The third princess was born on 31 July 1731, when her mother was still a primary consort, and was raised by Dowager Consort Chunyuqin, a consort of the Kangxi Emperor. She was bestowed the title of "Princess Hejing of the First Rank" (固伦和敬公主; hejing meaning "harmonious and respectful"), after the enthronement of the Qianlong Emperor.

In 1746, Ministry of Internal Affairs prepared a dowry worth of 2500 taels, and in April 1747, she married the Mongolian prince Septeng Baljur of the Borjigin clan. Her wedding banquet was held in the Hall of Preserving Harmony in the Forbidden City.

She continued to collect her meals from the palace. This kind of treatment was equal to that of an Imperial Noble Consort, foreshadowing the indulgence later received by her younger half-sisters Princess Hejing and Princess Hexiao.

The Princess gave birth to 4 daughters and 1 son, Eleke Temur Babai (personally named by her father). Her first daughter married Yonghuang's son, Miande, while her fourth daughter married Fengshenhulun, a son of Princess Hejia. After the marriage, the Princess continued lavish lifestyle—her annual expenses reached 15.000 taels, while her allowance was 80.000 taels.

Septeng Baljur died in 1775, leaving her widowed. Princess Hejing didn't remarry and died on 30 September 1792. Her coffin was interred in a tomb in Chaoyang District, Beijing.

== Family ==
Parents

- Father: Aisin-Gioro Hongli (爱新觉罗 弘曆), the Qianlong Emperor (乾隆帝)
- Mother: Empress Xiaoxianchun (孝賢純皇后) of the Fuca clan (富察氏) (28 March 1712 – 8 April 1748)

Consort(s) and issue

- Septeng Baljur (色布腾巴尔珠尔; 28 June 1731 – 15 August 1792) of the Khorchin Borjigin clan (愛新覺羅氏)
  - Eleke Temur Babai (鄂勒哲特穆尔额尔克巴拜; 1747 – 1793), first son
  - Lady Borijigin, first daughter
    - Married Miande (綿德) of the Aisin-Gioro clan (爱新觉罗氏), eldest son of Yonghuang, and had no issue
  - Lady Borjigin, second daughter
  - Lady Borjigin, third daughter
    - Married Prince Aohan of the Fourth Rank (汉固山贝子), a descendant of Princess Aohan of the First Rank, eldest daughter of Hong Taiji
  - Lady Borjigin, fourth daughter
    - Married Fengshenjilun (丰绅济伦) of the Fuca clan (富察氏), eldest son of Princess Hejia of the Second Rank, and had issue (four sons and one daughter)
