= Bordered Yellow Banner =

Part of the Manchu Eight Banners

- Flag of the Bordered Yellow Banner
- Active: 1615 – 1912
- Country: Later Jin; Qing dynasty
- Type: Cavalry; Musketeers
- Part of: Eight Banners
- Commander: Nurhaci The Emperor

Bordered Yellow Banner

Chinese name
- Traditional Chinese: 鑲黃旗
- Simplified Chinese: 镶黄旗
Transcriptions
Standard Mandarin
- Hanyu Pinyin: xiānghuángqí

Mongolian name
- Mongolian Cyrillic: Хөвөөт Шар Хошуу

Manchu name
- Manchu script: ᡴᡠᠪᡠᡥᡝ ᠰᡠᠸᠠᠶᠠᠨ ᡤᡡᠰᠠ
- Romanization: kubuhe suwayan gūsa

The Bordered Yellow Banner (Chinese: 鑲黃旗) was one of the Eight Banners of Manchu military and society during the Later Jin and Qing dynasty of China. The Bordered Yellow Banner was one of Three Upper Banner armies under the direct command of the emperor himself, and one of the four "left wing" banners. The Plain Yellow Banner and the Bordered Yellow Banner were split from each other in 1615, when the troops of the original four banner armies (Yellow, Blue, Red, and White) were divided into eight by adding a bordered variant to each banner's design. The Two Yellow Banners were originally commanded personally by Nurhaci. After Nurhaci's death, his son Hong Taiji became khan, and took control of both Yellow Banners. Later Hong Taiji took the Plain Blue Banner and formed the imperial Upper Three Banners. When Dorgon was regent he switched out the Plain Blue and inserted his Plain White Banner as part of the imperial Upper Three Banners. Later, the Shunzhi Emperor took over the Plain White Banner after the death of his regent, Dorgon, to whom it previously belonged. From that point forward, the emperor directly controlled Three Upper Banners (Plain Yellow, Bordered Yellow, and Plain White), as opposed to the other Five Lower Banners. Because of the direct control of the Three Upper Banners, there was no appointed banner commanders as opposed to the other five. The emperor's personal guards and guards of Forbidden City and maids were also only selected from the upper three banners.

== Notable people ==
- Nurhaci (founding khan of the Jurchen-led Later Jin dynasty)
- Hong Taiji (Manchu Prince, 8th son and heir of Nurhaci)
- Hooge, Prince Su (Manchu Prince, eldest son of Hong Taiji)
- Fulin (Manchu Prince, 9th son and heir of Hong Taiji)
- Eidu (Founding Manchu officer and a member of the Niohuru clan)
- Fiongdon (Founding Manchu officer and a member of the Guwalgiya clan)
- Ebilun (Manchu noble, 16th son of Eidu, 3rd Regent for the young Kangxi Emperor)
- Oboi (Manchu military commander, a member of the Guwalgiya clan, 4th Regent for the young Kangxi Emperor)
- Yuxian (Qing dynasty)
- Fan Wencheng (Qing dynasty scholar-official, prime minister and grand secretary of Han descent)
- Kangxi Emperor (Manchu Prince, 3rd son and heir of Shunzhi Emperor)
- Shi Lang (a Chinese admiral who served the Ming and Qing Dynasty, a former Naval officer for Zheng Chenggong's descendants in the 1660s, it is said that he was falsely accused of defecting to the Qing to which Zheng Chenggong killed Shi's father, brother and son which led to his eventual true defection to the Qing seeking revenge against the Zheng Royal Family in Taiwan.
- Empress Xiaoxianchun
- Fuheng
- Fuk'anggan
- Wenxiu, concubine of the Xuantong Emperor
- Noble Consort Wenxi
- Longkodo
- Empress Xiaodexian
- Empress Xiaoshencheng
- Empress Xiaomucheng
- Empress Xiaozheyi
- Yilibu
- King Pu-tsung
- Nian Gengyao (Han)
- Gao E (Han)
- Empress Xiaoyichun
- Taqibu
- Consort Fang
- Concubine Tian
- Consort Yuan
- Imperial Noble Consort Dunsu
- Imperial Noble Consort Gongshun
- Imperial Noble Consort Qinggong
- Consort Xun (Concubine of Tongzhi Emperor)
- Noble Consort Xin
- Wang Mintong

== Notable clans ==
- Aisingioro
- Fuca clan
- Niohuru
- Tunggiya
- Sakda
- Nian
- Gao
- Erdet
- Zhangjia
- Duola'er
- Zhalali
- Fan
- Wei
- Ma
- Zhao
- Shi
- Gorolo
- Yanzha

== Bibliography ==
- Elliott, Mark C. (2001), The Manchu Way: The Eight Banners and Ethnic Identity in Late Imperial China, Stanford University Press, ISBN 9780804746847
- Wakeman, Frederic Jr. (1985), The Great Enterprise: The Manchu Reconstruction of Imperial Order in Seventeenth-century China, Berkeley: University of California Press, ISBN 0520048040
