= Yonghuang =

Qing dynasty prince (1728–1750)

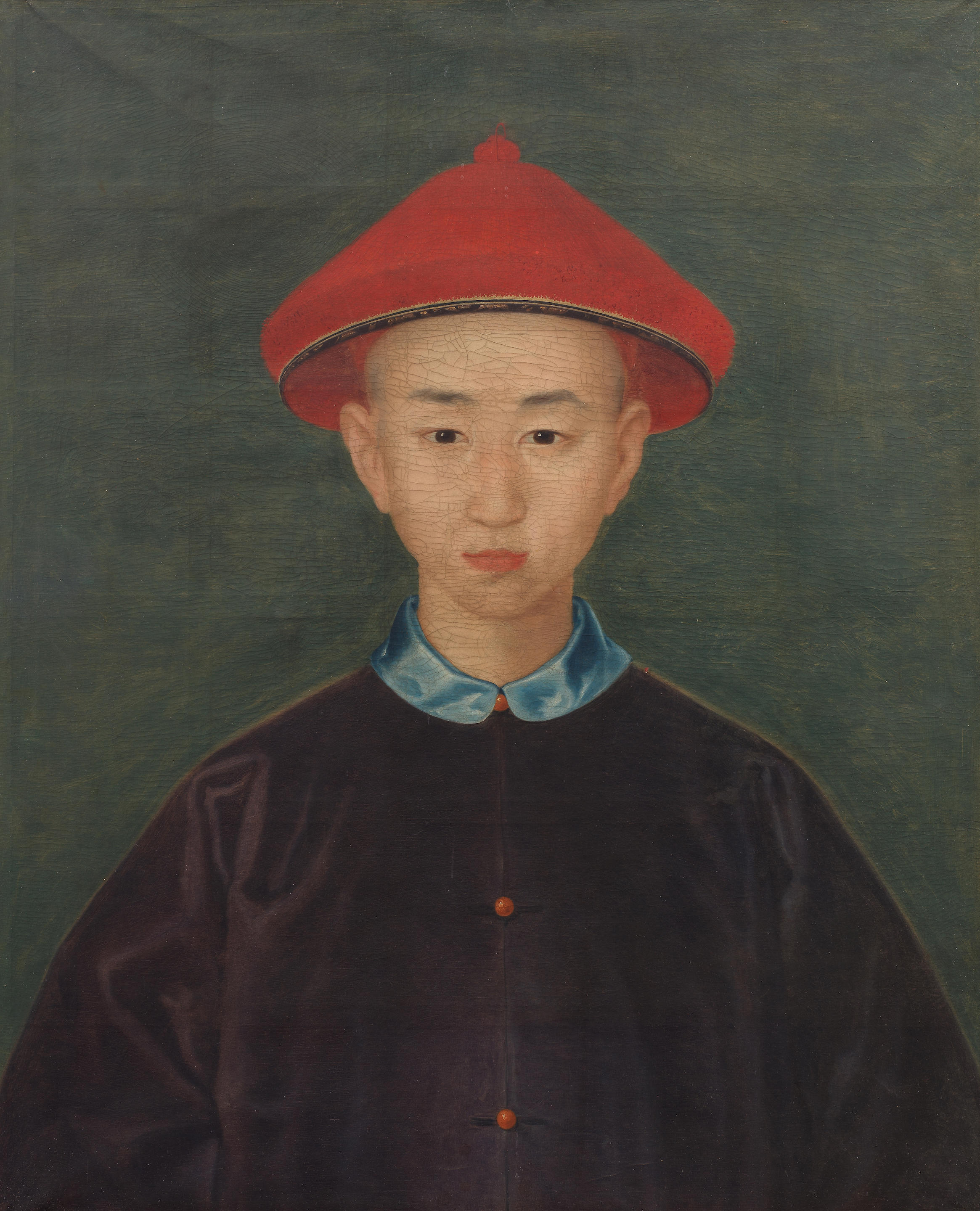
- Portrait thought to be Yonghuang

Prince Ding of the First Rank
- Tenure: Title posthumously awarded
- Predecessor: None
- Successor: Miande
- Born: 5 July 1728
- Died: 21 April 1750 (aged 21)
- Consorts: Lady Ilari (伊拉里氏)
- Issue: Miande; Mian'en
Names
- Aisin Gioro Yonghuang (愛新覺羅·永璜)
Posthumous name
- Prince Ding'an of the First Rank (定安親王)
- House: Aisin Gioro
- Father: Qianlong Emperor
- Mother: Imperial Noble Consort Zhemin

Yonghuang
- Traditional Chinese: 永璜
- Simplified Chinese: 永璜
Transcriptions
Standard Mandarin
- Hanyu Pinyin: Yǒnghuáng

Yonghuang (Manchu: ᠶᠣᠩ
ᡥᡠᠸᠠᠩ Yong huwang; 5 July 1728 – 21 April 1750), posthumous name Prince Ding'an of the First Rank, was an imperial prince of the Manchu-led Qing dynasty of China. He was the eldest son of the Qianlong Emperor. His mother was Imperial Noble Consort Zhemin. He was posthumously accorded the noble title Prince Ding of the First Rank.

== Life ==
His mother Imperial Noble Consort Zhemin died when he was very young. In 1748, while the Qianlong Emperor was on an inspection tour in southern China, his first empress consort, Empress Xiaoxianchun, died. Yonghuang, as the emperor's eldest son, was tasked with overseeing the empress's funeral. Yonghuang and his third brother, Yongzhang (永璋; 1735–1760), did not mourn the empress as deeply as expected. When the Qianlong Emperor found out later, he was extremely displeased, so he reprimanded Yonghuang and Yongzhang and removed them from his list of potential successors.

Yonghuang died in 1750. The Qianlong Emperor deeply regretted his earlier decision but it was too late. He gave Yonghuang the posthumous title "Prince Ding'an of the First Rank".

== Family ==
Primary Consort

- Primary consort, of the Ilari clan (嫡福晉 伊拉里氏)
  - Miande, Prince of the Fourth Rank (貝子 綿德; 11 August 1747 – 17 November 1786), first son

Secondary Consort

- Secondary consort, of the Irgen Gioro clan (側福晉 伊爾根覺羅氏)
  - Mian'en, Prince Dinggong of the First Rank (定恭親王 綿恩; 18 September 1747 – 18 July 1822), second son

== In fiction and popular culture ==
- Portrayed by Ding Qiao in Ruyi's Royal Love in the Palace (2018)

== See also ==
- Prince Ding
- Royal and noble ranks of the Qing dynasty § Male members
- Ranks of imperial consorts in China § Qing
