= Fuca clan =

Manchu clan and family name

Manchu name
- Manchu script: ᡶᡠᠴᠠ

Chinese name
- Chinese: 富察氏
Transcriptions
Standard Mandarin
- Hanyu Pinyin: fù chá shì

Pronunciation respelling name
- Pronunciation respelling: FOO-chah

Fuca was a clan of Manchu nobility. After the demise of the dynasty, some of its descendants sinicized their clan name to the Chinese surnames Fu (富/傅) or Li (李).

== Notable figures ==
=== Males ===
- Arantai (阿蘭泰; d. 1699), served as the Minister of Works from 1687–1688
  - Funingga (富寧安; d. 1728), Arantai's son; political figure
- Maci (1652–1739), political figure
- Fuheng (1720–1770), Maci's nephew; political and military figure
  - Fulong'an (福隆安; 1746–1784), Fuheng's second son
  - Fuk'anggan (1754–1796), Fuheng's son; general
    - Delin, Fuk'anggan's son
- Mingliang (明亮; 1736–1822), Fuheng's nephew
- Mingrui (d. 1768), Fuheng's nephew; general
- Fumin (福敏; 1673–1756), official
- Jingshou (景壽; 1829–1889), served as one of the Eight Regents of the Tongzhi Emperor
  - Zhiduan (志端; d. 1871), Jingshou's son by Princess Shou'en

Prince Consort

Date	Prince Consort	Background	Princess
1753	Mingliang		Yuntao's fourth daughter (1736–1825) by secondary consort Fanggiya
1760	Fulong'an		Princess Hejia (1745–1767), the Qianlong Emperor's fourth daughter by Imperial Noble Consort Chunhui (Su)
1845	Jingshou		Princess Shou'en (1831–1859), the Daoguang Emperor's sixth daughter by Empress Xiaojingcheng (Khorchin Borjigit)
1866	Zhiduan		Princess Rongshou (1854–1924), Yixin's first daughter by primary consort (Gūwalgiya)
1905	Songchun (松椿; d. 1927)		Yixuan's third daughter (1887–1914) by secondary consort (Ligiya)

=== Females ===
Imperial Consort

- Empress
  - Empress Xiaoxianchun (1712–1748), the Qianlong Emperor's first empress, the mother of first daughter (1728–1730), Yonglian (1730–1738), Princess Hejing (1731–1792) and Yongcong (1746–1748)
- Imperial Noble Consort
  - Imperial Noble Consort Zhemin (d. 1735), the Qianlong Emperor's concubine, the mother of Yonghuang (1728–1750) and second daughter (1731–1732)
  - Imperial Noble Consort Shushen (1859–1904), the Tongzhi Emperor's imperial noble consort
- Consort
  - Consort Jin (d. 1823), the Qianlong Emperor's noble lady
- Imperial Concubine
  - Imperial Concubine Tian (1789–1845), the Daoguang Emperor's imperial concubine

Princess Consort

- Primary Consort
  - Gundei (d. 1620), Nurhaci's second primary consort, the mother of Manggūltai (1587–1633), Mangguji (1590–1636) and Degelei (1597–1635)
  - Šurhaci's third primary consort (d. 1620), the mother of E'enzhe (1584 – 1638 or 1639), Amin (1586–1640) and third daughter (b. 1588)
  - Yunki's second primary consort
  - Yuntao's primary consort, the mother of second son (1706–1707) and Hongshi (1707–1710)
  - Yunci's primary consort
  - Yongrong's first primary consort (d. 1772), the mother of Miancong (1766–1780), second daughter (1768), Mian'ai (1769–1771) and fourth daughter (1770–1779)
  - Yongxing's primary consort (d. 1813), the mother of Mianqin (1768–1820), first daughter (1770–1771), Mianyi (1771–1809) and third daughter (1775–1783)
- Secondary Consort
  - Yinxiang's secondary consort, the mother of third daughter (1710 – 1711 or 1712)
- Concubine
  - Daišan's concubine, the mother of tenth daughter (1638–1710)
  - Fuquan's concubine, the mother of Zhansheng (1678–1681)
  - Yunzhi's concubine, the mother of fifth son (1699)
  - Yunyou's concubine, the mother of Princess (1726–1745) and tenth daughter (1728–1730)
  - Yunlu's concubine, the mother of third daughter (1721 – 1722 or 1723)

== See also ==
- List of Manchu clans
