= Yonglian =

Crown Prince of the Qing dynasty (1730–1738)

Aisin Gioro Yonglian 愛新覺羅·永璉

Crown Prince of the Qing dynasty
- Predecessor: Yunreng, Prince Limi of the First Rank
- Successor: Yongcong, Prince Zhe
- Born: 9 August 1730 (雍正八年六月二十六日); Changchun Palace, Forbidden City, Beijing, Qing China
- Died: 23 November 1738 (aged 8) (乾隆三年十月十二日); Ningshou Palace, Forbidden City, Beijing, Qing China
- Burial: Crown Prince Duanhui's Garden
Posthumous name
- Crown Prince Duanhui (端慧皇太子)
- House: Aisin Gioro
- Father: Qianlong Emperor
- Mother: Empress Xiaoxianchun

Yonglian (Chinese: 永璉; 9 August 1730 – 23 November 1738), posthumous name Crown Prince Duanhui (端慧皇太子), was an imperial prince of the Manchu-led Qing dynasty of China. Yonglian was the second son of the Qianlong Emperor by his first wife, Empress Xiaoxianchun.

== Life ==
The prince was named by his grandfather, the Yongzheng Emperor. The character lian (璉) in his name means vessel for holding grain offerings in an ancestral hall, which suggests that he would eventually inherit the imperial throne.

Yonglian was intelligent, noble and was the only legitimate son of the Qianlong Emperor at that time. His father secretly appointed him as his heir. On 8 August 1736, the Qianlong Emperor issued a secret decree to establish Yonglian as the crown prince. The decree was hidden behind a plaque in the Qianqing Palace.

He suffered from smallpox and died on 23 November 1738, while he was staying in Ningshou Palace (宁寿宫). The Qianlong Emperor and Empress Fuca were devastated. The Qianlong Emperor didn't go to court for five days, and he made public the secret appointment of Yonglian as crown prince. The Qianlong Emperor ordered Yonglian's funeral to be treated as that of a crown prince. Yonglian was given the posthumous name Duanhui (端慧) and his father built a garden for his dead son to be buried. The garden is known as Crown Prince Duanhui's Garden.

== In popular culture ==
- Portrayed by Yu Yao in Ruyi's Royal Love in the Palace (2018)

== Ancestry ==
Shunzhi Emperor (1638–1661)
Kangxi Emperor (1654–1722)
Empress Xiaokangzhang (1638–1663)
Yongzheng Emperor (1678–1735)
Weiwu
Empress Xiaogongren (1660–1723)
Lady Saiheli
Qianlong Emperor (1711–1799)
Wulu
Lingzhu (1664–1754)
Lady Qiao
Empress Xiaoshengxian (1692–1777)
Wugong
Lady Peng
Yonglian (1730 – 1738)
Lirongbao
Empress Xiaoxianchun (1712–1748)
