= Empress Xiaoxianchun =

Empress of China from 1738 to 1748

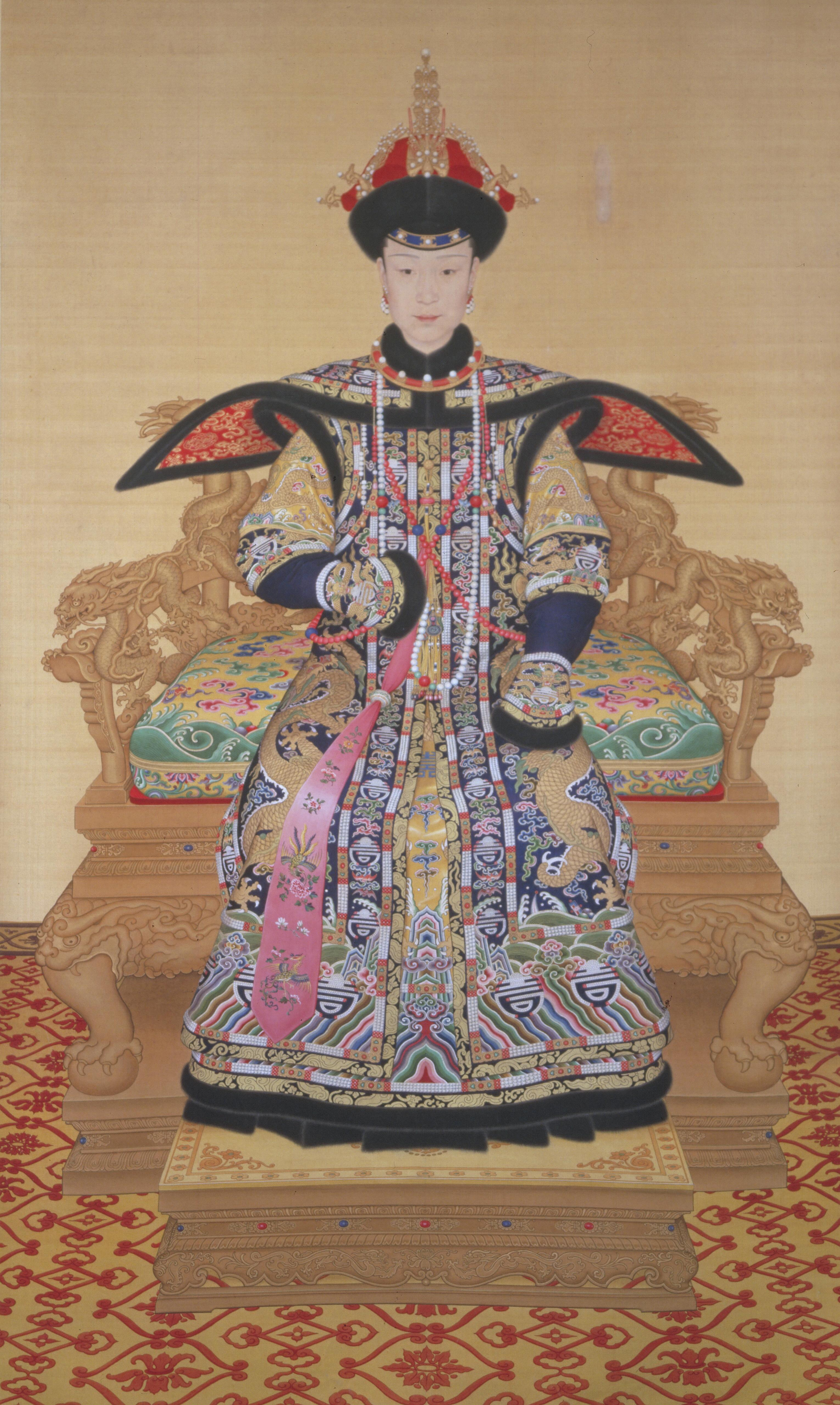

Empress of the Qing dynasty
- Tenure: 23 January 1738 – 8 April 1748
- Predecessor: Empress Xiaojingxian
- Successor: Empress Nara
- Born: 28 March 1712
- Died: 8 April 1748 (aged 36); Forbidden City, Shuntian Prefecture, Qing China
- Burial: Yu Mausoleum, Eastern Qing tombs
- Spouse: Qianlong Emperor (m. 1727)
- Issue Detail: Yonglian, Crown Prince Duanhui; Princess Hejing of the First Rank
Posthumous name
- Empress Xiaoxian Chengzheng Dunmu Renhui Huigong Kangshun Futian Changsheng Chun (孝賢誠正敦穆仁惠徽恭康順輔天昌聖純皇后)
- House: Fuca (by birth); Aisin Gioro (by marriage)
- Father: Lirongbao (李榮保)
- Mother: Lady Gioro (覺羅氏)
- Religion: Vajrayana Buddhism

Chinese name
- Traditional Chinese: 孝賢純皇后
- Simplified Chinese: 孝贤纯皇后
Transcriptions
Standard Mandarin
- Hanyu Pinyin: Xiàoxiánchún Huánghòu

Manchu name
- Manchu script: ᡥᡳᠶᠣᠣᡧᡠᠩᡤᠠ ᡝᡵᡩᡝᠮᡠᠩᡤᡝ ᠶᠣᠩᡴᡳᠶᠠᠩᡤᠠ ᡥᡡᠸᠠᠩᡥᡝᠣ
- Romanization: hiyoošungga erdemungge yongkiyangga hūwangheo

Empress Xiaoxianchun (28 March 1712 – 8 April 1748), of the Manchu Bordered Yellow Banner Fuca clan, was the first empress consort of the Qianlong Emperor of China's Qing dynasty.

== Life ==
=== Family background ===
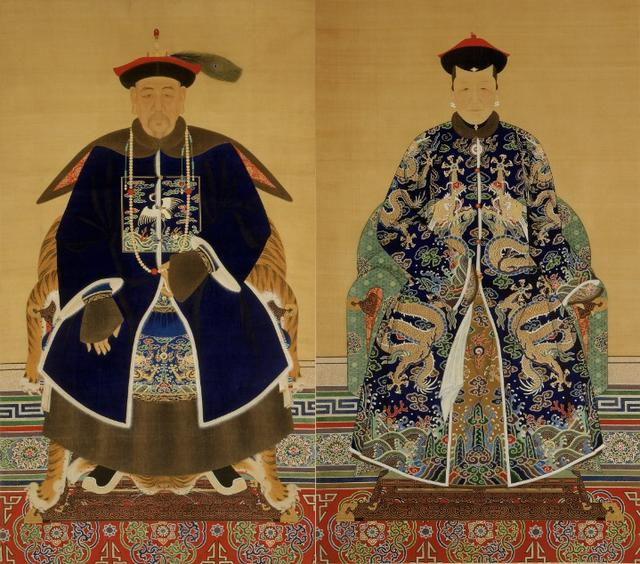
Parents of Empress Xiaoxianchun

Empress Xiaoxianchun's personal name was not recorded in history.

- Father: Lirongbao (李榮保; 1674–1723), served as a third rank military official (總管) of Chahar and held the title of duke of the first class (一等公)
  - Grandfather: Misihan (米思翰; 1633–1675), served as the Minister of Revenue
  - Uncle: Maci (马齐; 1652–1739), a court official who served in the Ministry of War from 1691 to 1694 and in the Ministry of Revenue from 1692 to 1701, as well as in the Grand Secretariat during the reign of the Kangxi Emperor
- Mother: Lady Gioro (覺羅氏)
- Seven elder brothers and two younger brothers:
  - Ninth younger brother: Fuheng (傅恒; 1720–1770), a senior minister who served as the Qianlong Emperor's grand councillor
- One younger sister: wife of Salashan

=== Kangxi era ===
Lady Fuca was born on the 22nd day of the 2nd lunar month in the 51st year of the reign of the Kangxi Emperor, which translates to 28 March 1712 in the Gregorian calendar.

=== Yongzheng era ===
On 3 September 1727, Lady Fuca married Hongli, the Yongzheng Emperor's fourth son, as his primary consort and moved into Changchun Palace in the western part of the Forbidden City. She gave birth on 3 November 1728 to her husband's first daughter, who died prematurely on 14 February 1730. On 9 August 1730, she gave birth to his second son, Yonglian, who died of a chill on 23 November 1738. On 31 July 1731, she gave birth to Hongli's third daughter, Princess Hejing of the First Rank. Over time, Lady Fuca developed a wonderful relationship with Lady Gao, her husband's secondary consort since 1734.

=== Qianlong era ===
The Yongzheng Emperor died on 8 October 1735 and was succeeded by Hongli, who was enthroned as the Qianlong Emperor. On 23 January 1738, Lady Fuca, as the new emperor's primary consort, was instated as empress. She was assisted by Noble Consort Gao in managing the palace at large and caring for Empress Dowager Chongqing.

In the Draft History of Qing, Empress Fuca is described as a respected and virtuous person who looked after the people in the palace, serving her role well. She was praised and favored by her husband. It is also said that she did not like spending money for her own aggrandizement and wore artificial flowers in her hair instead of expensive jewelry. The Qianlong Emperor once told her that their Manchu ancestors were too poor to make their own pouches from cloth and had to settle for simple deer hide instead, so she immediately made one for him. He was touched by the gift.

Empress Fuca took her duties seriously when it came to Confucian rituals. As head of the imperial harem, she supervised the other palace women when performing rituals. One of these was a rite concerning sericulture that was presided over by the empress. This rite, which had been practised since the Zhou dynasty, was gradually restored during the reign of the Qianlong Emperor. For the purpose of the rite, a sericulture altar was completed in 1744, largely at her urging. That year, she became the first Qing empress to personally lead these rituals, making offerings of mulberry. In 1751, the whole rite was painted on four scrolls in her memory.

On 27 May 1746, Empress Fuca gave birth to the Qianlong Emperor's seventh son, Yongcong. Her husband had high hopes for their son and named him crown prince shortly after his birth. However, Yongcong died prematurely on 29 January 1748 due to smallpox.

=== Death ===
In 1748, during one of the Qianlong Emperor's southern tours, Empress Fuca became seriously ill with a malarial fever and eventually died on 8 April, three months after Yongcong's death. Her funeral was lavishly done. Her husband was deeply affected and did not take her death well. When he found out that two of his sons, Yonghuang and Yongzhang, had not mourned for Empress Fuca as much as was expected, he issued an edict removing both of them from his list of potential successors to the throne. In addition, the court officials who shaved their hair, which was considered disrespectful as it was forbidden to do so throughout the mourning period, were either heavily punished or executed.

The bereaved Emperor wrote the poem Expressing My Grief after her death:

When entering her bedroom,

I inhale sadness.

I climb behind her phoenix bed-curtains,

Yet they hang to no avail.

The romance of the spring breeze and autumn moon all ends here.

Summer days and winter nights spent with her will never come again.

== Titles ==
- During the reign of the Kangxi Emperor (r. 1661–1722):
  - Lady Fuca (富察氏)
- During the reign of the Yongzheng Emperor (r. 1722–1735):
  - Primary Consort (嫡福晉; from 3 September 1727)
- During the reign of the Qianlong Emperor (r. 1735–1796):
  - Empress (皇后; from 23 January 1738)
  - Empress Xiaoxian (孝賢皇后; from 16 June 1748)
- During the reign of the Jiaqing Emperor (r. 1796–1820):
  - Empress Xiaoxianchun (孝賢純皇后; from 1799)

== Issue ==
- As primary consort:
  - Unnamed daughter (3 November 1728 – 14 February 1730), the Qianlong Emperor's first daughter
  - Yonglian (永璉), Crown Prince Duanhui (端慧皇太子; 9 August 1730 – 23 November 1738), the Qianlong Emperor's second son
  - Princess Hejing of the First Rank (固倫和敬公主; 31 July 1731 – 30 September 1792), the Qianlong Emperor's third daughter
    - Married Septeng Baljur (色布騰巴爾珠爾; ? – 1775), of the Mongol Khorchin Borjigin clan in April/May 1747
- As empress:
  - Yongcong (永琮), Prince Zhe of First Rank (哲親王; 27 May 1746 – 29 January 1748), the Qianlong Emperor's seventh son

== Gallery ==
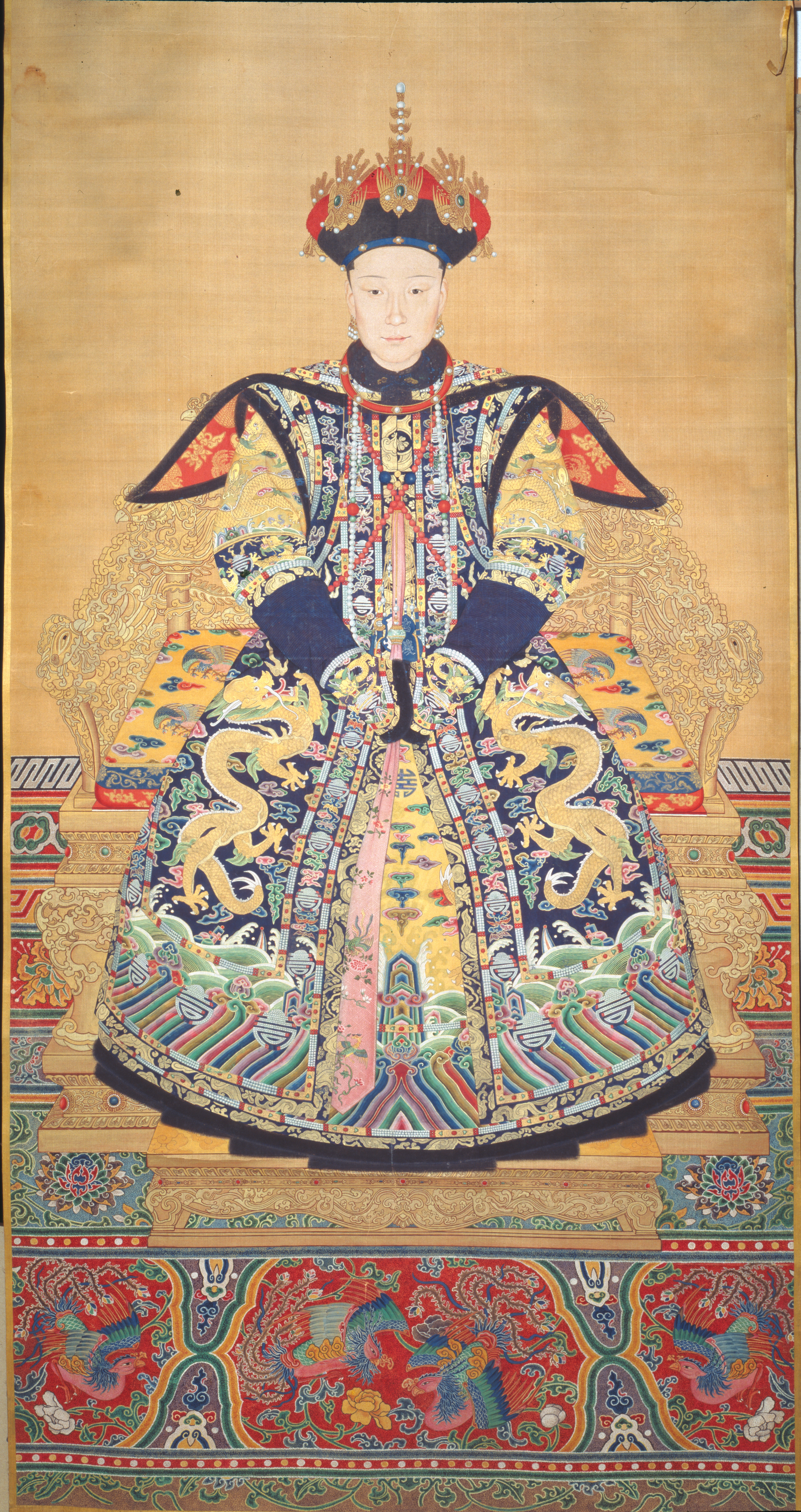
Empress Xiaoxianchun in court dress

The Qianlong Emperor's consorts with children and two court ladies in 1747, by Giuseppe Castiglione

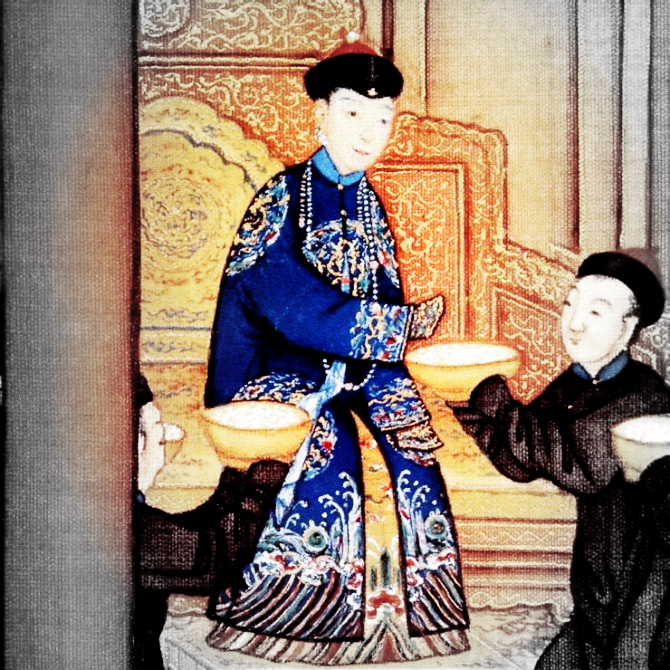
Empress Xiaoxianchun handling silkworms

== In popular culture ==
- Portrayed by Shally Tsang in Take Care, Your Highness! (1985)
- Portrayed by Chan Fuk-sang in The Rise and Fall of Qing Dynasty (1988)
- Portrayed by Chen Yi in Jiangshan Weizhong (2002)
- Portrayed by Joyce Tang in The Prince's Shadow (2005)
- Portrayed by Yuan Yi in Empresses in the Palace (2011)
- Portrayed by Qin Lan in Story of Yanxi Palace (2018)
- Portrayed by Dong Jie in Ruyi's Royal Love in the Palace (2018)

== See also ==
- Imperial Chinese harem system
- Imperial and noble ranks of the Qing dynasty

== Notes ==
Empress Xiaoxianchun Fuca
Chinese royalty
Preceded by Empress Xiaojingxian	Empress of China; 23 January 1738 – 8 April 1748	Succeeded by Empress Nara
