= Fuqing (general) =

Qing-dynasty Manchu soldier (d. 1750)

Fuqing (Chinese: 傅清; Manchu: ᡶᡠᠴᡳᠩ fucing; died 1750) was a Manchu soldier who began his career in the Imperial Guard, and in 1744 was sent as amban to Tibet where he remained until the danger of a Tibetan-Dzungar alliance seemed over. The last king of Tibet would not submit to the tutelage of the Qing dynasty, and having poisoned his elder brother, proceeded to prepare for revolt. Fuqing returned with all speed and slew the king in the Chinese Residency, whither he had lured him. This resulted in the Lhasa riot of 1750, in which Fuqing and his staff perished. The Kashag government system of four Kalön under the Dalai and Panchen Lamas was then established. The amban's guard was raised to 1500 men, and all intercourse with Tibet and Dzungaria was forbidden. The Qianlong Emperor published a special decree defending the treachery of Fuqing, and ennobled his heir as Viscount. He was canonised and included in the Temple of Worthies.
