= Story of Yanxi Palace =

2019 Chinese historical series

- Promotional poster
- Chinese: 延禧攻略
- Hanyu Pinyin: Yánxǐgōnglüè
- Genre: Historical fiction
- Written by: Zhou Mo
- Directed by: Hui Kaidong; Wen Deguang
- Starring: Wu Jinyan; Charmaine Sheh; Qin Lan; Nie Yuan
- Country of origin: China
- Original language: Mandarin
- No. of episodes: 70

Production
- Executive producer: Yu Zheng
- Production location: Hengdian World Studios
- Running time: 45 minutes
- Production companies: Huanyu Film iQIYI

Original release
- Network: iQIYI; Zhejiang Television
- Release: July 19 – August 26, 2018

Related
- Yanxi Palace: Princess Adventure

Story of Yanxi Palace (Chinese: 延禧攻略; pinyin: Yánxǐgōnglüè) is a 2018 Chinese television series created by Yu Zheng for iQIYI. Starring Wu Jinyan, Charmaine Sheh, Qin Lan and Nie Yuan, the series aired on iQIYI from July 19, 2018 to August 26, 2018. The series recounts the struggles of a palace maid in the court of the Qianlong Emperor.

Distributed in more than 70 markets worldwide, Story of Yanxi Palace became a huge hit across Asia, catapulting Wu Jinyan and Xu Kai to stardom and revitalizing the careers of Qin Lan and Charmaine Sheh. It was the most googled TV show in the world in 2018, despite Google being blocked in Mainland China, and was streamed over 15 billion times on iQIYI that year. A spin-off/sequel titled Yanxi Palace: Princess Adventures was released on Netflix on December 31, 2019.

== Plot ==
Embroidery Bureau (Episode 1–7)

During the Qing dynasty, Wei Yingluo enters the court of the Qianlong Emperor as an embroidery maid to secretly investigate her older sister Wei Yingning's mysterious death. Yingluo survives the machinations of other embroidery maids jealous of her skills and impresses Empress Fuca with her wit.

Changchun Palace I (Episode 8–27)

At first believing the imperial guard Fuca Fuheng to be the prime suspect, Yingluo schemes to approach his older sister, the Empress Fuca, and succeeds in getting transferred from the Embroidery Bureau to Changchun Palace, where the Empress resides. Yingluo serves the Empress together with head palace maids Erqing and Mingyu, where she eventually becomes a trusted confidante of the Empress and learns that the Fuca siblings are innocent of the crime. Yingluo and Fuheng also fall for each other in the meantime.

Yingluo eventually catches the attention of the Emperor himself. Although she is not of noble birth and illiterate, the Empress teaches her how to read and write, as well as the proper etiquette and mannerisms for noblewomen. The Empress also saves her several times from punishment for probing too deeply into her sister's death. In turn, Yingluo helps the Empress survive a series of schemes by her rivals. The two develop a close friendship.

Over time, Yingluo discovers that her sister was raped by Prince He, the fifth son of the late Yongzheng Emperor and a younger half-brother of the current Emperor. To cover up the crime, the Prince's mother, Consort Dowager Yu ordered Yingning to be put to death. Yingluo hatches a plot that leads to Consort Dowager Yu's death by a lightning strike.

Hard Labour Department (Episode 28–36)

The Empress feigns anger over Yingluo's actions and banishes her to the Hard Labor Department, allowing her to escape a potentially more severe punishment from the Emperor. There, Yingluo befriends a conniving eunuch, Yuan Chunwang.

Without Yingluo, the Empress falls victim to the machinations of Noble Consort Gao, which puts her in a coma. News reaches Yingluo, who visits the Empress' chamber to care for her. Her devotion, quick wit and defiance attracts the Emperor. Developing an infatuation, he forbids Fuheng and Yingluo from marrying, pointing to Yingluo's lowly origins and cunning character. Despite this, Fuheng persists in his feelings. However, when Yingluo faces a death sentence after being schemed against by the jealous Consort Chun, Fuheng backs down to appease the Emperor and agrees to marry Erqing, breaking Yingluo's heart.

Meanwhile, Consort Xian leverages on Yingluo's plan to avenge the Empress and eventually drives Noble Consort Gao to commit suicide. Consort Chun, scorned by her unrequited longtime infatuation with Fuheng, turns away from Fuheng and Empress Fuca. Instigated by the now Noble Consort Xian, who manages the Imperial Harem while Empress Fuca lies in a coma, Consort Chun successfully strives to become the Emperor's new favourite, and bears the sixth prince, Yongrong. Empress Fuca awakes from her coma, but is unable to walk anymore. She pleads with the Emperor to revoke his decision that Fuheng and Erqing are to marry, but to no avail. The Emperor relents on his tough stance towards Yingluo and allows her to return to Empress Fuca's side.

Changchun Palace II (Episode 37–40)

At the Fuca Manor, the relationship between Fuheng and Erqing, already without mutual affection from the start, quickly deteriorates. Fuheng leaves to lead a military campaign for the Emperor. Under the care of Yingluo and Mingyu, Empress Fuca eventually recovers fully and can walk again. Erqing, now Madame Fuca, returns to Changchun Palace as a guest, and pushes Empress Fuca to become pregnant, against the advice of the Imperial Physicians. Empress Fuca gives birth to the seventh prince (Yongcong), almost dying from difficult labour. The birth of the seventh prince is a setback to Consort Chun. She arranges for a fire to break out in Changchun Palace while Yingluo is away, killing the seventh prince. Adding to Empress Fuca's desperation, Erqing makes the fake confession to the Empress that she was pregnant from the Emperor. The devastated Empress commits suicide.

Summer Palace I (Episode 41–42)

After Empress Fuca's death, Noble Consort Xian is made Emperor Qianlong's second wife, Empress Nara (the Step-Empress). Yingluo is exiled to the Summer Palace to guard over Empress Fuca's tomb and memorial tablet. She stays there with Yuan Chunwang until the Emperor and the imperial consorts arrive for the summer to celebrate the Empress Dowager's birthday. During the celebrations, Yingluo learns that Consort Chun was responsible for the late Empress Fuca's death. She decides to reenter the Forbidden City and avenge Empress Fuca. However, her decision deeply breaks Yuan Chunwang's trust.

Yanxi Palace I (Episode 43–57)

To achieve her goal, Yingluo skillfully charms the Empress Dowager and becomes part of the Imperial Harem, being bestowed the rank of noble lady (five ranks below the empress). With the help of Mingyu, Hailancha and Fuheng after his return, she succeeds in captivating the Emperor, and even though other concubines sabotage her frequently, she rises quickly to the rank of Consort. She exposes Consort Chun's role in the late Empress Fuca's death, and has Erqing killed for her involvement in Empress Fuca's suicide.

The Step-Empress starts to perceive Yingluo as a threat to her position. In secret, she employs Yuan Chunwang, who has returned to Yanxi Palace as Yingluo's head eunuch. Yuan Chunwang bears grudges against Yingluo since she has abandoned him to become an imperial concubine, and on the Step-Empress' orders, he makes it known that Yingluo is secretly taking contraceptives. Yingluo immediately loses the favour of the Emperor, who has fallen for her at this point.

Yingluo allies with the Empress Dowager, whose own relationship with the Emperor has been put to the test after the Step-Empress reveals that the Emperor is not the biological son of the Empress Dowager, but of Lady Qian, a Han Chinese consort of the late Yongzheng Emperor who had died under mysterious circumstances. It is implied that the Empress Dowager had killed Lady Qian to adopt her son.

Summer Palace II (Episode 58)

Yingluo and the Empress Dowager, the two women most dear to the Emperor, go into self-imposed exile in the Summer Palace. The Emperor to feel guilty for doubting his adoptive mother, who undeniably raised and protected him for years.

Yanxi Palace II (Episode 59–70)

Some time later, a new threat in the form of newcomer Concubine Shun calls Yingluo back to the Forbidden City. Yingluo sets out to reclaim the Emperor's favour, but finds herself befriended by her rival. However, the beautiful Concubine Shun has her own agenda and proves to be cunning and dangerous. Teaming up with the Step-Empress Nara, she frames Yingluo for attempted assassination, putting Yingluo under house arrest. This gives Yuan Chunwang the opportunity for revenge by starving and mistreating Yingluo. Nevertheless, Yingluo is able to reverse her situation, reveal Concubine Shun's treachery, and reclaim the Emperor's affections for her. At the same time, Yingluo is discovered to be pregnant with the Emperor's child, much to his happiness. Having reached a stalemate at this point, Yingluo negotiates a truce with the Step-Empress Nara on the condition that neither of them will harm any imperial offspring despite their rivalry.

Over the next ten years, Yingluo goes on to bear two daughters and two sons. Her first son dies in early childhood, and her health slowly deteriorates. She also raises the Fifth Prince Yongqi and is the Emperor's most favoured consort.

Yuan Chunwang, now Step-Empress Nara's trusted servant, betrays his new mistress by causing a series of mishaps in the palace that destabilise her rule. He uses Prince He's affections for the Step-Empress to instigate a rebellion. They plot to sabotage the imperial southern boat tour and seize power, hoping to free each other from their eroding positions. One night during the tour, a group of rebels suddenly storms the imperial ship. Fire breaks out in the Empress Dowager's cabin, prompting the Emperor to charge into the flames to save his mother, seemingly perishing in the process.

The next morning, as Prince He gallantly appears to restore order from the overnight coup, the Emperor and the Empress Dowager emerge safely from a secret passageway designed by Fuheng and expose the treachery. The Step-Empress betrays Prince He, having always loved the Emperor and hoping to use the rebellion to prove her devotion to her husband. Just then, Yingluo emerges from hiding under the protection of the Emperor's guards, being the only consort to have received such protection. This overt favouritism, after all of her years of devotion, causes the Step-Empress to break down into a fit of rage and cut off her hair, a taboo in Manchu tradition.

As the Emperor sentences Prince He to confinement and the Step-Empress is taken away, Yuan Chunwang proclaims his innocence, only for Yingluo to reveal his role in the failed coup and recent chaos. Yuan Chunwang announces that he is the illegitimate son of the late Yongzheng Emperor and the full-brother of the Emperor. Years ago, the late emperor was met with a bandit attack in the Taihang Mountains; Lady Qian happened upon the attack and exchanged clothes with the late emperor to distract the bandits away from him and took him home to recover from the attack. Years later after Lady Qian's death, Lady Qian's family was approached by the Prince Lian, who told Yuan Chunwang of his supposed imperial heritage. Hoping to meet his father and claim his birthright as a prince, Yuan Chunwang allowed himself to be castrated and serve as a eunuch at the Yongzheng Emperor's manor, but was instead met with denial and labor. Feeling wronged, he vowed revenge upon the imperial family.

While the Empress Dowager confirms the Yongzheng Emperor's attack, she denies that Yuan Chunwang is the late emperor's son, implying that he is the child of a bandit who took advantage of the situation and raped the disguised Lady Qian. Realizing he has been misled by a lie and all his scheming was for nothing, Yuan Chunwang is driven into madness. But when the Emperor decides to execute Yuan Chunwang, the Empress Dowager asks the Emperor to spare him. The insane Yuan Chunwang is banished to the Hard Labour Department for life.

Back in the Forbidden City, the Step-Empress Nara is placed under house arrest and stripped of her authority for committing the hair cutting taboo as well as her role in the failed coup, but is permitted to keep her title as well as taken care of at Yingluo's intervention and arrangement. Yingluo visits the Step-Empress, and reveals that she pleaded for leniency to repay an act of kindness the Step-Empress showed her years ago. When Yingluo was working in the Hard Labour Department, the Step-Empress (then known as Consort Xian) had sent for an imperial physician to treat her after she had collapsed, thereby saving her life. Meanwhile, Prince He is given poisoned wine by the Emperor, who has spared him but also arranged for him to die of an illness in the comfort of his manor. With Prince He executed for his crimes, Yingluo's mission to avenge her sister is finally complete.

In the end, Yingluo is elevated to the rank of Imperial Noble Consort, and as the highest ranking consort, she acts as deputy empress and is granted the authority to manage the Inner Palace.

== Cast and characters ==
=== Main ===
Actor	Character	Role
Wu Jinyan	Wei Yingluo	Embroidery Bureau Maid 绣坊宫女 → Changchun Palace Maid 长春宫宫女 → Maid of the Hard Labor Department 辛者库奴婢 → Changchun Palace Maid 长春宫掌事宫女 → Maid of the Old Summer Palace 圆明园宫女 → Noble Lady Wei 魏贵人 → Imperial Concubine Ling 令嫔 → Consort Ling 令妃 → Noble Consort Ling 令贵妃 → Imperial Noble Consort 皇贵妃 An upright and cunning woman who is ahead of her time in terms of knowledge and reasoning. She enters the palace to investigate the murder of her sister and uses her innate skills to rise above the tangles of conventional palace rivalries and defeat her enemies. Rises to be the favoured consort of Emperor Qianlong, adoptive mother of the 5th Prince (Yongqi), and birth mother of the 7th Princess (Zhaohua), 9th Princess (Zhaoyu), 14th Prince (Yonglu), and 15th Prince (Yongyan).
Charmaine Sheh	Hoifa-Nara Shushen	Consort Xian 娴妃 → Noble Consort Xian 娴贵妃 → Imperial Noble Consort 皇贵妃 → Empress Nara 那拉皇后 She is initially a kind-hearted woman who desires only peace, but soon realizes that her kindness only results in her being stepped on. Not after long, she changes her attitude and turns into a Machiavellian, scheming and manipulative character. She becomes the second wife and Step-Empress of the Qianlong Emperor. Birth mother of 12th Prince (Yongji) and 13th Prince (Yongjing). Also adoptive mother of the 4th Prince (Yongcheng).
Nie Yuan	Aisin-Gioro Hongli	Qianlong Emperor 乾隆帝 The fifth emperor of the Qing dynasty, who rules sternly but justly.
Xu Kai	Fuca Fuheng	Imperial Palace Guard 御前侍卫 → Assistant Minister of Revenue 戶部侍郎 → Duke Zhongyong of the First Rank 一等忠勇公 Third young master of the Fuca Clan and younger brother of Empress Fuca. Due to his good looks and outstanding reputation, he is enormously popular among the various palace maids. He falls in love with Yingluo, but in order to protect her, he marries Hitara Erqing under the pressure of circumstances. Nominally the father of Fukangan. Initially head of the Imperial Guards, he later becomes the Emperor's highly regarded court official, minister, military general, and is bestowed the title of a Duke of the first rank.

=== Supporting ===
==== Imperial Harem ====
Actor	Character	Role
Qin Lan	Fuca Rongyin	Empress Fuca 富察皇后 → Empress Xiaoxian 孝贤皇后 The first wife of the Qianlong Emperor. Kind, gentle and virtuous, she mentors Yingluo while the latter serves in Changchun Palace. Living up to her high moral standards, she never schemes against anyone, but is in turn targeted by other consorts, most notably by Noble Consort Gao. Eventually, she commits suicide out of grief for consecutively losing her two sons.
Tan Zhuo	Gao Ningxin	Noble Consort Gao 高贵妃 → Imperial Noble Consort Huixian 慧贤皇贵妃 The highest-ranked imperial consort after Empress Fuca. She is ruthless, sly and manipulative, and will do anything to inflict suffering on anyone who dares to oppose her. Conspires with the elder Lady Jin and Nalan Chunxue against Empress Fuca, Yingluo, and Hoifa-Nara Shushen.
Wang Yuanke	Su Jinghao	Consort Chun 纯妃 → Noble Consort Chun 纯贵妃 → Second Class Attendant Su 蘇答應 Described as gentle and sophisticated by many, she is in truth a supremely intelligent schemer. Having been infatuated with Fuca Fuheng since her youth, she allies herself with Empress Fuca, actively avoids the Emperor's favor, and is an outspoken adversary of Noble Consort Gao. Later, she turns against Empress Fuca and Yingluo. Mother of the sixth prince (Yongrong).
Lian Lian	Keliyete Ayan	Noble Lady Yu 愉贵人 → Imperial Concubine Yu 愉嫔 → Consort Yu 愉妃 Timid and cowardly, she remains reticent about the abuse she suffers under Gao Ningxin until Yingluo and Empress Fuca come to her protection. She allies herself with Su Jinghao in the later half of the series and turns against Yingluo, but sacrifices herself in the end to reveal Su Jinghao's crimes out of gratitude to Yingluo and the late Empress Fuca. She is spared but exiled to a convent for her involvement in Su Jinghao's crimes; before leaving, entrusts her son, the Fifth Prince (Yongqi), to Yingluo.
Xu Baihui	Lady Huang	Imperial Concubine Yi 怡嫔 Keliyete Ayan's closest friend at the beginning of the series who commits suicide after being publicly insulted by Gao Ningxin's personal attendant for making accusations against Gao.
Pan Shiqi	Lady Jin	Imperial Concubine Jia 嘉嫔 → Noble Lady Jia 嘉贵人→ Second Class Attendant Jin 金答應 Elder of the two Jin sisters. She is an ally of Gao Ningxin and takes the fall for their schemes against Empress Fuca and Hoifa-Nara Shushen, the latter of whom kills her to avenge her family and secure fosterhood of her son. Birth mother of the Fourth Prince (Yongcheng).
Pan Shiqi	Lady Jin	Noble Lady Jia 嘉贵人→ Imperial Concubine Jia 嘉嫔 → Consort Jia 嘉妃 Younger of the two Jin sisters, who enters the imperial harem after her sister's demotion and death. She repeatedly sabotages Yingluo, with little success. [In the original script, she is set up by Concubine Shun and loses the Emperor's favour.]
Li Chun'ai	Nalan Chunxue	Noble Lady Shu 舒贵人 → Imperial Concubine Shu 舒嫔 → Consort Shu 舒妃 Determined to succeed early in the series, she sides with Gao Ningxin and repeatedly sabotages Empress Fuca and Yingluo. She is a morally ambiguous figure and develops into a comic relief character as the series progresses.
Li Ruoning	Lu Wanwan	First Class Attendant Qing 庆常在 → Noble Lady Qing 庆贵人 → Imperial Concubine Qing 庆嫔 → Consort Qing 庆妃 Entered the palace at the same time as Noble Lady Shu and is her closest friend early in the series. Quiet but morally self-assured, she is a reserved person who can nevertheless effect big changes. She later becomes Yingluo's confidante and helps raise the Fifteenth Prince (Yongyan).
Jenny Zhang	Niohuru Chenbi	Noble Lady Chang 常貴人 [Noble Lady He 和貴人 in the original script] → Imperial Concubine Shun 顺嫔 [Imperial Concubine Rong 容嫔 in the original script] Beautiful and charming with an air of naivety, she is in truth a single mother kidnapped by Aibida, who held her son hostage to force her to become a lady in the Emperor's harem. After her son dies while trying to escape, Chenbi attempts suicide, but is saved by Fuheng. She decides to exact her vengeance on her captors. She becomes the most favoured consort in Yingluo's absence and gains the trust of Yingluo, while skillfully alienating her from the Emperor and Empress Dowager. She attempts to assassinate the Emperor; although she fails and is placed under house arrest, her revenge against Aibida is successful. [In the original script, she is the holy maiden of a Xinjiang Tribe who is gifted to the Emperor as a peace offering. In the final cut, she is the lost daughter of Niohuru Aibida.]
Liu Lu	Lady Barin	Noble Lady Ying 颖贵人 → Imperial Concubine Ying 颖嫔 → Consort Ying 颖妃
Wang Xinhui	Lady Chen	Noble Lady Wan 婉贵人 → Imperial Concubine Wan 婉嫔
Fu Xiaoyu	Lady Socoro	Noble Lady Rui 瑞贵人

==== Palace Maids ====
Actor	Character	Role
Su Qing	Hitara Erqing	Head Maid of Changchun Palace 长春宫 掌事宫女 → Madame Fuca 富察夫人 → Duchess Zhongyong of the First Rank 一等忠勇公夫人 Personal attendant of Fuca Rongyin and initially well-regarded as the Empress' most trusted confidante, she later grows jealous of Yingluo and resorts to ever more drastic measures to achieve her goals by manipulating Mingyu and the Fuca family. Birth mother of Fuca Fukangan.
Jiang Zixin	Mingyu 明玉	Maid of Changchun Palace 长春宫 宫女 → Head Maid of Changchun Palace 长春宫 掌事宫女 → Maid of Zhongcui Palace 钟粹宫 宫女 → Head Maid of Yanxi Palace 延禧宫 掌事宫女. Personal attendant of Fuca Rongyin. Often lectured for speaking out of place, she remains unreservedly loyal to the Empress. She initially dislikes Yingluo, but becomes her reliable friend and personal attendant. Falls in love with Hailancha, who proposes to marry her in the later part of the series.
Fang Anna	Zhen'er 珍儿	Head Maid of Chengqian Palace 承乾宫 掌事宫女 Personal attendant of Hoifa-Nara Shushen who falls for Yuan Chunwang and unwittingly contributes to the former's downfall.
Yang Xue	Yunxiang 云香	Senior Maid of Chengqian Palace who offended the Step-Empress and was punished.
Shi Yufei	Zhilan 芝兰	Head Maid of Chuxiu Palace 储秀宫掌事宫女 Personal attendant of Gao Ningxin.
Chen Mo	Yuhu 玉壶	Head Maid of Zhongcui Palace 钟粹宫掌事宫女 Personal attendant of Su Jinghao and romantic interest of Wang Zhong, a eunuch from the heating department.
Ren Wanjing	Fangcao 芳草	Senior Maid of Yonghe Palace 永和宫大宫女 Personal attendant of Keliyete Ayan who was bribed by elder Lady Jin.
Liu Sisi	Heye 荷叶	Maid of Yonghe Palace 永和宫宫女 Personal attendant of Keliyete Ayan.
Qian Chenjie	A'shuang 阿双	Senior Maid of Chuxiu Palace 储秀宫大宫女 Personal attendant of the elder Lady Jin.
Liu Shitong	Lan'er 兰儿	Head Maid of Chuxiu Palace 储秀宫掌事宫女 Personal attendant of the younger Lady Jin.
Zhang Jie	Yizhu 遗珠	Head Maid of Lijing Chambers 丽景轩 掌事宫女 Personal attendant of Niohuru Chenbi.
Ma Shunsha	Dongzao 冬枣	Personal attendant of Nalan Chunxue.
Li Jiawei	Aunt Liu 刘姑姑	Head Maid of Shoukang Palace 寿康宫掌事宫女 Personal attendant of Empress Dowager who is well-versed in medicine.
Gao Rui	Bailing 百灵	Senior Maid of Shoukang Palace 寿康宫大宫女 Personal attendant of Dowager Consort Yu.
Yang Jingru	Hupo 琥珀	Maid of Changchun Palace 长春宫宫女 → Maid of Yanxi Palace 延禧宫宫女 → Maid of the Hard Labor Department 辛者库宫女 Served Empress Fuca under Head Maids Erqing, Mingyu, and Yingluo. Sent to annoy Yingluo when she first became an imperial consort and later banished by Qianlong to the Hard Labour Department for disrespecting Yingluo.
Zhang Tianyun	Zhenzhu 珍珠	Maid of Changchun Palace 长春宫宫女 → Maid of Yanxi Palace 延禧宫宫女 → Head Maid of Yanxi Palace 延禧宫掌事宫女 Served Empress Fuca under Head Maids Erqing, Mingyu, and Yingluo. Sent to serve Yingluo when she first became an imperial consort and later Head Maid and personal attendant of Consort Ling.
An An	Manao 玛瑙	Maids of Changchun Palace
Zhao Mengjie	Feicui 翡翠	Maids of Changchun Palace
Xu Gege	Hongluo 红螺	Maids of Changchun Palace

Embroidery Bureau and Hard Labour Department

Actor	Character	Role
Zhang Yixi	Jixiang 吉祥	Embroidery maid close to Yingluo and framed by Linglong for theft.
Gao Yu'er	Jinxiu 锦绣	Embroidery maid jealous of Yingluo and banished to the Hard Labour Department for making untrue accusations towards the former.
Chen Ruoxi	Linglong 玲珑	Embroidery maid jealous of Yingluo, constantly eggs Jinxiu and Aunt Fang to frame Yingluo. Pretends to befriend Yingluo after Jixiang's death.
He Jiayi	Supervisor Zhang 张嬷嬷	Head of the Embroidery Bureau 绣坊掌事宫女 A kind mentor to the embroidery maids.
Yin Xu	Aunt Fang Nizi 方姑姑	Deputy Head of the Embroidery Bureau 绣坊掌事宫女 A mean superior who dislikes Yingluo and banished from the palace after failing to frame Yingluo.
Deng Sha	Wei Yingning / A'man 魏璎宁 / 阿满	Embroidery Maid → Mistress of Prince He of the First Rank 和亲王格格 Yingluo's elder sister who died from alleged suicide at the start of the series. While in the embroidery bureau her name was changed to A'man to avoid the naming taboo with Gao's personal name, Ningxin.
Zhang Tingting	Supervisor Liu 刘嬷嬷	Head of the Hard Labor Department 辛者库掌事宫女 Bribed by Su Jinghao to frame Yingluo for using black magic on the late Gao Ningxin.

Palace Eunuchs

Actor	Character	Role
Liu Enshang	Li Yu 李玉	Head Eunuch of Yangxin Palace 养心殿首领太监 Personal attendant and trusted confidante to Qianlong Emperor and a comic relief for the series.
Chang Cheng	Desheng 德盛	Deputy Head Eunuch of Yangxin Palace 养心殿副首领太监 Personal attendant to Qianlong Emperor and a comic relief for the series.
Wang Maolei	Yuan Chunwang 袁春望	Eunuch of the Hard Labor Department 辛者库太监 → Supervisor of the Hard Labor Department 辛者库管事 → Deputy Supervisor of the Imperial Household Department 内务府副管事 → Eunuch of the Imperial Gardens 圆明园杂役 → Head Eunuch of Yanxi Palace 延禧宫首领太监 → Eunuch of Chengqian Palace 承乾宫太监 Sworn brother of Yingluo at the Hard Labour Department who believes they are two of a kind. Obsessed with Yingluo, he is determined to do whatever it takes to make her see it his way.
Zheng Long	Xiao Quanzi 小全子	Eunuch of Yanxi Palace 延禧宫太监 → Head Eunuch of Yanxi Palace 延禧宫首领太监 Initially bribed by the younger Lady Jin to frame Yingluo, he later pledges loyalty to Yingluo for forgiving his misdeeds.
Sun Di	Wu Shulai 吴书来	Head Eunuch of the Imperial Household Department 内务府总管太监

==== Imperial Guards and Physicians ====
Actor	Character	Role	Ref.
Lawrence Wong	Suolun Hailancha 索伦·海兰察	Imperial Guard and Fuca Fuheng's closest friend who falls in love with Mingyu, and later proposes to her.	
Tan Xuqi	Cigiya Qingxi 齐佳·庆锡	Imperial Guard and Wei Yingning's alleged lover.	
Yong Yi	Ye Tianshi 叶天士	A talented travelling doctor who becomes an imperial physician. Befriends and is trusted by Yingluo.	
Wu Lihua	Imperial Physician Zhang 张院判	Head Imperial Physician.	

==== Imperial Family ====
Actor	Character	Role	Ref.
Wang Huichun	Aisin-Gioro Yinzhen	Yongzheng Emperor, father of Qianlong. Deceased at the start of the series and only seen in flashbacks.	
Ma Chunyan	Lady Ula-Nara	Empress Xiaojingxian, wife of the Yongzheng Emperor and Qianlong's legitimate mother. She chose Fuca Rongyin as his primary consort. Deceased at the start of the series and only seen in flashbacks.	
Song Chunli	Lady Niohuru	Empress Dowager Chongqing 崇庆皇太后 Empress Dowager and one of the late Yongzheng Emperor's high-ranked imperial consorts. She is a pious Buddhist who prizes a stable empire above all and actively pursues a stable Imperial Harem, but also a force to be reckoned with. Adoptive mother to Hongli and birth mother to Princess Hean.	
Bai Shan	Lady Geng	Dowager Noble Consort Yu 裕太妃 One of the Yongzheng Emperor's high-ranked imperial consorts and regarded as a pious and devout Buddhist. Birth mother to Hongzhou.	
Gong Fangmin	Aisin-Gioro Yuntao	Prince Lü of the First Rank, Kangxi Emperor's 12th son and Qianlong Emperor's uncle who is critical of Hongzhou's unruly behavior.	
Zhang Bin	Aisin-Gioro Yunxi	Prince Shen of the Second Rank, Kangxi Emperor's 21st son and Qianlong Emperor's uncle who is young and fond of Hongzhou.	
Gu Tiantian	Aisin-Gioro Hongshi	Yongzheng Emperor's 3rd son and Qianlong's older half-brother who tried to poison Qianlong when they were young.	
Hong Yao / Yan Xinhao	Aisin-Gioro Hongzhou	Prince He of the First Rank Yongzheng Emperor's 5th son and Qianlong Emperor's younger half-brother. He puts on an apathetic, foolhardy demeanor to conceal his ambition and lifelong disappointment of always being second to the Qianlong Emperor.	
–	Aisin-Gioro Yonglian	Second Prince → posthumously Crown Prince Duanhui Second son to Emperor Qianlong by Empress Fuca. Died at age 9 before the start of the series.	
Fang Yangfei	Aisin-Gioro Yongcheng	Fourth Prince → Prince Lü of the First Rank Fourth son of the Qianlong Emperor by elder Lady Jin; raised by Hoifa-Nara Shushen but often insecure when compared to his brothers, allowing Yuan Chuanwang and Zhen'er to sow discord between him and the Step-Empress.	
Chen Youwei	Aisin-Gioro Yongqi	Fifth Prince → Prince Rong of the First Rank Fifth son of the Qianlong Emperor by Keliyete Ayan; raised by Yingluo. Incredibly talented and capable.	
Zhou Yicheng	Aisin-Gioro Yongrong	Sixth Prince → Prince Zhi of the Second Rank Sixth son of the Qianlong Emperor by Su Jinghao.	
–	Aisin-Gioro Yongcong	Seventh Prince → posthumously Prince Zhe of the First Rank Seventh son to Emperor Qianlong by Empress Fuca. Died in infancy due to a fire at Changchun Palace.	
–	Aisin-Gioro Yongyue	Tenth son of the Qianlong Emperor by Nalan Chunxue, died in infancy.	
Sun Ao	Aisin-Gioro Yongji	Twelfth son of the Qianlong Emperor by Step-Empress Nara. A hardworking child who the Step-Empress worries is no match to Yongqi.	
–	Aisin-Gioro Yongjing	Thirteenth son of the Qianlong Emperor by Step-Empress Nara, died in infancy.	
–	Aisin-Gioro Yonglu	Fourteenth son of the Qianlong Emperor by Yingluo, died in infancy.	
Tang Jiatong	Aisin-Gioro Yongyan	Fifteenth Prince → Prince Jia of the First Rank → Future Jiaqing Emperor Fifteenth son of the Qianlong Emperor by Yingluo; raised by Consort Qing and doted on by Consort Shu.	

Others

Actor	Character	Role
–	Qian Zhengyuan 钱正源	Elder brother of Lady Qian and Qianlong Emperor's biological maternal uncle.
Zhou Jianhua	Wang Tianyi 王天一	Personal guard to the late Yongzheng Emperor and mentor to the young Qianlong Emperor. Revealed the truth behind the death of Qianlong's biological mother, Lady Qian.
Shen Baoping	Wei Qingtai	Father of Wei Yingluo and Wei Yingning.
Ru Ping	Old Madame Fuca	Mother of Fuca Rongyin, Fuheng, and two older sons. Legitimate mother to Fuca Fuqian. Mother-in-law to Qianlong Emperor and Hitara Erqing, and paternal grandmother of Fukangan.
Wei Yankan	Fuca Fuqian 富察·傅谦	Fourth young master of the Fuca Clan and half-brother to Fuca Rongyin and Fuheng. Infuatuated with his sister-in-law, Erqing.
Zhuang Zexi	Fuca Fukangan	Erqing's son with disputed paternity – officially Fuheng, allegedly Qianlong, and biologically Fuqian.
Fang Chutong	Qinglian 青莲	Maid of Fuca Manor. A pretty personal attendant and trusted confidante of Fuca Fuheng. Secretly infatuated with Fuheng. Regularly the target of Erqing's fits of jealousy.
Mo Xiaoman	Dujuan 杜鹃	Maid of Fuca Manor. Personal attendant of Erqing as Madame Fuca .
Su Mao	Gao Bin	Father of Gao Ningxin and Gao Heng.
Zheng Xiaodong	Gao Heng	Older brother of Gao Ningxin.
Yao Moping	Hoifa-Nara Naerbu 辉发那拉·那尔布	Father of Hoifa-Nara Shushen and Changshou.
Dai Chunrong	Lady Langiya 郎佳氏	Mother of Hoifa-Nara Shushen and Changshou.
Wang Chenyao	Hoifa-Nara Changshou 辉发那拉·常寿	Younger brother of Hoifa-Nara Shushen.
–	Niohuru Aibida	Father of Niohuru Chenbi and brother of Niohuru Neqin. Executed due to Chenbi's failed assassination attempt.
Sun Yong	Niohuru Neqin 钮祜禄·讷亲	Uncle of Niohuru Chenbi and brother of Niohuru Aibida. Executed due to failure at War of Jinchuan.

== Production ==
Many of the props and costumes were made using traditional Chinese crafts that are dying out, with few experts remaining to pass on their skills to the next generation. The acquisition of these skills requires a lifetime of commitment, since they are unsurprisingly labor-intensive, demanding a sharp eye and tireless hands.

=== Velvet flowers (ronghua) ===
The velvet flower headwears used by the main characters were designed based on historical documents or antiques housed in the Palace Museum. Each adornment was created according to the characteristics of individual women. Zhao Shuxian, one of the few craftsmen still making velvet flowers, created all the pieces in the show. The technique dates back to the Tang dynasty (618–907) and refers to the creation of not only floral displays, but also animal shapes made of silk on a twisted wire frame.

=== Jeweled hairpins (tian-tsui) ===
Worn by the imperial consorts as status symbols of opulence, these are hairpins of a particular vibrant blue hue, made from the preserved feathers of the wings and back of the kingfisher bird. The technique resembles cloisonné, inlaid with pearls and other gemstones.

== Soundtrack ==
Story of Yanxi Palace Original Soundtrack (OST)

Soundtrack album by Various Artists
- Released: July 23, 2018
- Genres: Mandopop; Ballad
- Language: Mandarin
- Label: Dongyang Huanyu Film

The original soundtrack was released as an extended play on July 23, 2018. "Willows of the Palace" by Li Chunai was released independently from the album.

A 70-track studio album titled The Story of Yanxi Palace TV soundtrack (延禧攻略 影视剧配乐) was released on July 19, 2018, containing the instrumental music of the series composed by Chen Guoliang. The music was recorded in J Productions House, and features flute player Tan Baoshuo, violin player Leslie Ryang, pipa player Liu Tuotong, erhu player Huang Leting, and Li Junzhu as the female voice. A total of 129 pieces were used in the show.

No.	Title	Lyrics	Music	Singers	Length
1.	"Look (看)" (Opening theme song)	Yu Zheng; Lu Hu	Lu Hu	Lu Hu	4:03
2.	"Sighs of the Palace Walls (红墙叹)" (Ending theme song)	Wang Yaoguang	Wen Kui	Hu Xia	4:30
3.	"The Sound of Snow Falling (雪落下的声音)" (Ending theme song)	Yu Zheng; Lu Hu	Lu Hu	Lu Hu	5:11
4.	"The Sound of Snow Falling (雪落下的声音)"	Yu Zheng; Lu Hu	Lu Hu	Qin Lan	5:05
5.	"Forgetting About Each Other (相忘)" (Ending theme song)	Wang Xiaoqian	Yang Chengyin	Su Qing	4:13
6.	"Willows of the Palace (宫墙柳)"	Yu Zheng	Tan Xuan	Li Chunai	4:13

In the Philippines, "Aahon" JMKO was released under ABS-CBN Star Music and was the show's theme song.

== Reception ==
The series generated online buzz for its engaging plot of a "Cinderella" tale with Chinese characteristics. It set the single-day online viewership record in China with a total of 530 million views, and had attracted a cumulative 13 billion views as of August 2018. It was streamed more than 15 billion times on iQIYI in 2018, and was the most watched online drama in China for 39 consecutive days over the summer.

Many viewers praised the story, because unlike the amicable heroines they were used to seeing, the main character Wei Yingluo fights fire with fire and outmaneuvers her opponents. It also received praise for its well-developed characters and exciting interpretation by the actors, beautiful cinematography and intricate costume design, as well as its accurate portrayal of the Qing dynasty setting. Owing to its success, there has been an increased number of visitors to the Palace Museum in Beijing.

=== Ratings ===
Zhejiang Television CSM52 City Network 09:30–16:00 ratings
Air date	Ratings (%)	Rank	Audience share (%)	Daily cumulative eps
September 24, 2018	0.253 (AM); 0.498 (PM)	1	—	8
September 25, 2018	0.330	7	3.787	4
September 27, 2018	0.319	6	3.853	4
September 28, 2018	0.354	5	4.316	4
September 29, 2018	0.285	7	3.780	4
October 1, 2018	0.593	—	—	8
October 2, 2018	0.615	—	—	8
October 3, 2018	0.689	1	7.317	8
October 4, 2018	0.694	1	7.474	8
October 5, 2018	0.603	1	6.202	2 + 6 (two rounds)
Re-run
October 6, 2018	0.565	2	5.576	8
October 7, 2018	0.619	2	5.787	8
October 8, 2018	0.403	4	4.894	4
October 9, 2018	0.422	4	4.915	4
October 10, 2018	0.494	2	5.957	4
October 11, 2018	0.442	1	5.546	4
October 12, 2018	0.520	1	6.485	4
October 13, 2018	0.518	1	5.451	8
October 14, 2018	0.588	1	5.848	8
October 15, 2018	0.528	1	6.362	4
October 16, 2018	0.541	1	6.545	4

- Highest ratings are marked in red, lowest ratings are marked in blue

=== Controversy ===
There was outrage in China after a Vietnamese website managed to acquire episodes not yet shown in China and asked visitors to the website to answer questions confirming their Vietnamese identity before the website loads. "This service is for Vietnamese people only. Please answer the following questions: To which country do the Hoàng Sa Islands (Paracel Islands) belong? Vietnam, China, Philippines or Japan?". The only correct answer to the question was "Vietnam". Copies of the episodes were later removed from the platform.

=== Censorship ===
On January 25, 2019, the Beijing Daily, an official government newspaper, criticized the program for failing to promote socialist values. Four days later, on January 29, the Chinese government cancelled the program and similar programs such as Ruyi's Royal Love in the Palace. CNN and other media outlets quickly reported on this incident, calling it Chinese censorship. A Hong Kong professor stated that the show was censored because it became too popular and its content defied social norms.

== Awards and nominations ==
Year	Award	Category	Nominated work	Result	Ref.
2018	5th Hengdian Film and TV Festival of China	Best Television Series	Story of Yanxi Palace	Won	
2018	24th Huading Awards	Best Actress (Ancient Drama)	Wu Jinyan	Won	
2018	24th Huading Awards	Best Supporting Actress	Charmaine Sheh	Nominated	
2018	24th Huading Awards	Best Supporting Actress	Qin Lan	Nominated	
2019	Golden Bud – The Third Network Film and Television Festival	Most Influential Web Series	Story of Yanxi Palace	Won	
2019	Influence of Recreational Responsibilities Awards	Web Drama of the Year	Story of Yanxi Palace	Won	
2019	Asian Academy Creative Awards	Best Telenovela/Soap Opera	Story of Yanxi Palace	Won	

== International broadcast ==
Region	Network	Dates	Notes
(Hong Kong) (Macau) (Singapore) (Malaysia) (Australia) (United States)	TVB Jade	6 August–6 October (Monday–Friday at 20:30). (Two episodes back to back on Saturday & Sunday at 20:30).	Dubbed in Cantonese, 26 August and 22 September was not aired. TVB Jade aired at 20:30 on 1 October.
(Malaysia)	Astro AOD	6 August–6 October (Monday–Friday at 20:30). (Two episodes back to back on Saturday & Sunday at 20:30).	Dubbed in Cantonese, 26 August and 22 September was not aired. TVB Jade aired at 20:30 on 1 October.
(Vietnam)	HTV7 – Ho Chi Minh City Television	9 August–October 2018 (Monday-Friday at 17:00).	Dubbed in Vietnamese.
(Vietnam)	H1 – Hanoi Radio Television	22 November 2018 – 20 February 2019 at 19:50: Monday–Friday and Sunday (before 19 January 2019); Every day (19 January–20 February 2019)	Aired on the Film for fans (Vietnamese: Phim truyện Dành cho người hâm mộ) time slot. Original language with Vietnamese voiceover. Edited to 77 episodes. Delayed on 25 November 2018 and from 4 to 7 February 2019. Episodes 49 to the end aired every day.
(Vietnam)	VTC1	March–13 May 2019 (at 17:00).	Dubbed in Vietnamese.
(Singapore)	Hub VV Drama	20 September–present (weekdays at 17:00).	Original language with subtitles.
(Singapore)	Mediacorp Channel U	8 March–13 June (weekdays at 22:00).	Original language with subtitles.
(Canada)	Fairchild TV 2 HD (FTV2HD)	From 6 August (Monday–Friday). Vancouver (West) 4:30pm, 8:30pm & Toronto (East) 7:30pm, 11:30pm.	Dubbed in Cantonese (TVB Version).
(Philippines)	ABS-CBN (defunct)	27 January–5 May 2020 (cancelled broadcast on free-to-air, due to the network's shutdown because of expired franchise).	Dubbed in Filipino.
(Philippines)	Asianovela Channel (defunct)	1–30 June 2020 (cancelled re-run)	Dubbed in Filipino.
(Philippines)	Kapamilya Channel	November 2, 2020 – February 12, 2021 (complete re-run, via cable and satellite).	Dubbed in Filipino.
(India)	Sony Entertainment Television	TBA	Dubbed in Hindi.
(Indonesia)	RCTI	TBA	Dubbed in Indonesian.
(South Africa)	M-Net	TBA	Dubbed in English.
(United States)	CTI America	From 3 September 2018 (weekdays) at 7:00 PM. Repeat at next day 3:00 PM.	Original language with subtitles.
(Japan)	Eigeki	From 18 February 2019 (Monday–Friday at 21:00).	Original language with subtitles.
(Cambodia)	PPCTV Drama 10	From 10 March 2019 (Monday–Sunday at 11:30 & 19:30).	Dubbed in Khmer.
(Malaysia)	8TV	16 September–22 December 2019 (Monday–Friday at 19:00).	Original language with subtitles.
(Malaysia)	Astro Prima	TBA	Dubbed in Malay.
(Poland)	Polsat 1	TBA	Dubbed in Polish.
(Romania)	TVR 1	9 October 2019 – 28 January 2020 (Monday–Friday at 17:35) & 24 March–13 July 2020 (Monday–Friday at 17:00).	Original language with subtitles.
(Lithuania)	LNK	4 January–30 August 2020 (Saturday–Sunday at 17:45).	Dubbed in Lithuanian.
(Portugal)	RTP1	TBA	Original language with subtitles.
(Mongolia)	Asian Box (Mongolia)	5 June–10 July 2019 (Monday–Friday at 22:00).	Dubbed in Mongolian.
(Turkey)	TRT 1	TBA	Dubbed in Turkish.

== Sequel ==
On December 31, 2019, Netflix released the six-episode spinoff Yanxi Palace: Princess Adventures, which covers the marriage of Wei Yingluo's daughter, Zhaohua.

Main Cast

- Wang Herun as Princess Zhaohua
- Wang Yizhe as Fuca Fuk’anggan
- Wang Yuwei as Lhawang Dorji, Prince Chaoyong
- Xu Xiaonuo as Princess Siwan
- Wu Jinyan as Wei Yingluo, Imperial Noble Consort Ling
- Nie Yuan as Aisin-Gioro Hongli, Qianlong Emperor

Recurring & Guest Cast

- Zhang Tianyun as Zhenzhu, personal maid to Imperial Noble Consort Ling
- Xu Yuan as Chisu, personal maid to Princess Zhaohua
- Wang Chenyixian as Dingxiang, personal maid to Princess Siwan
- Liu Enshang as Li Yu, Head Eunuch
- Chang Cheng as Desheng, eunuch in service to the Qianlong Emperor
- Zheng Long as Xiao Quanzi, eunuch in service to Imperial Noble Consort Ling
- Wei Yankan as Fuca Fuqian, uncle of Fuk'anggan
