= Empress Xiaoyichun =

Empress of the Qing dynasty (1727–1775)

- Empress of the Qing dynasty (posthumously)
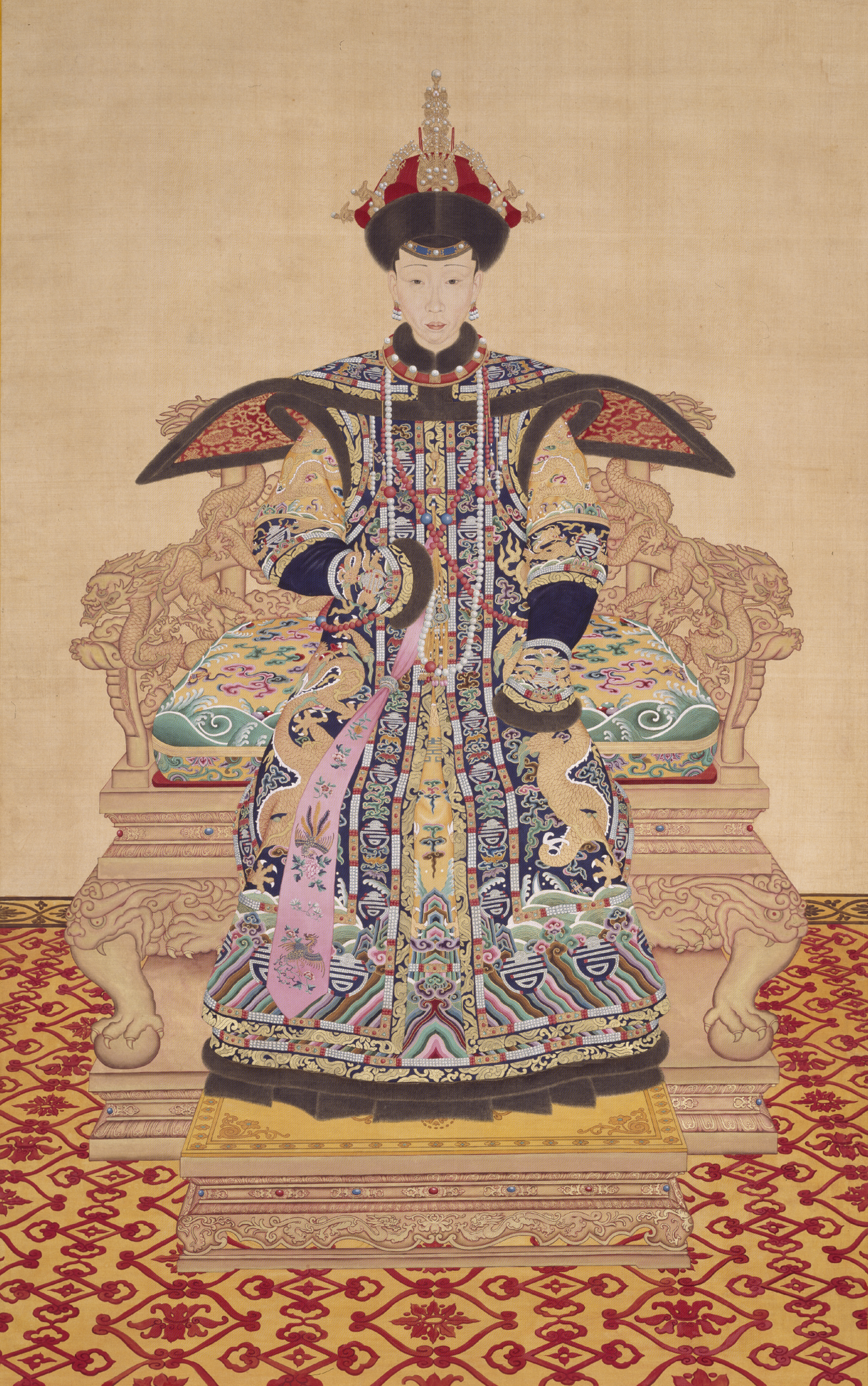
- Portrait attributed to Giuseppe Castiglione
- Born: 23 October 1727
- Died: 28 February 1775 (aged 47); Forbidden City, Shuntian Prefecture, Zhili (in present-day Beijing)
- Burial: Yu Mausoleum, Eastern Qing tombs
- Spouse: Qianlong Emperor (m. 1745)
- Issue Detail: Princess Hejing of the First Rank; Princess Heke of the Second Rank; Jiaqing Emperor; Yonglin, Prince Qingxi of the First Rank
Posthumous name
- Empress Xiaoyi Gongshun Kangyu Ciren Duanke Minzhe Yitian Yusheng Chun (孝儀恭順康裕慈仁端恪敏哲翼天毓聖純皇后)
- House: Wei, later Weigiya (魏佳; by birth); Aisin-Gioro (by marriage)
- Father: Wei Qingtai
- Mother: Lady Yanggiya

Chinese name
- Traditional Chinese: 孝儀純皇后
- Simplified Chinese: 孝仪纯皇后
Transcriptions
Standard Mandarin
- Hanyu Pinyin: Xiàoyíchún Huánghòu

Manchu name
- Manchu script: ᡥᡳᠶᠣᠣᡧᡠᠩᡤᠠ ᠶᠣᠩᠰᠣᠩᡤᠣ ᠶᠣᠩᡴᡳᠶᠠᡥᠠ ᡥᡡᠸᠠᠩᡥᡝᠣ
- Romanization: hiyoošungga yongsonggo yongkiyaha hūwangheo

Empress Xiaoyichun (23 October 1727 – 28 February 1775), of the Manchu Bordered Yellow Banner Weigiya clan, was an imperial consort of the Qing dynasty. She was one of the most favored consorts of the Qianlong Emperor, with whom she conceived seven children.

== Life ==
=== Family background ===
Empress Xiaoyichun's personal name was not recorded in history. She was a Han Chinese Booi Aha of the Bordered Yellow Banner by birth.

- Father: Wei Qingtai (魏清泰), who served as a fifth rank official (內管領) in the Imperial Household Department and held the title of duke of the third class (三等公)
  - Grandfather: Wei Jiuling (魏九齡)
- Mother: Lady Yanggiya (楊佳氏)
- One elder sister

Lady Wei was born on the 9th day of the 9th lunar month in the 5th year of the reign of the Yongzheng Emperor, which translates to 23 October 1727 in the Gregorian calendar.

It is not known when Lady Wei entered the Forbidden City, but the Draft History of Qing described her as "from the Weigiya family, daughter of Qingtai, a bondservant manager in the Imperial Household Department". Firstly, the surname "Weigiya" is the Manchu adaptation of the Han Chinese surname "Wei". Historical sources explain that her family was elevated to the Manchu Banner system and granted the character "giya", transforming their family name into "Weigiya". This indicates that Consort Ling was originally Han Chinese, not Manchu by ethnicity.

Next, examining her father's role as a bondservant manager in the Imperial Household Department, it is understood that this was a managerial position, but limited to bondservants. Consequently, her family belonged to the bondservant class and was not part of the Eight Banners. Since bondservant families were excluded from the imperial draft system, Consort Ling could not have entered the imperial harem directly as a consort. Instead, her entry into the palace was likely through a selection process for daughters of bondservant households. This process primarily involved selecting palace maids (gōngnǚ) and female officials (guānnǚzǐ).

In 1745, she was granted the rank of noble lady. On 9 December 1745, she was elevated to concubine, with the honorific title "Ling" (令; "excellent", "virtuous").

On 20 May 1749, she was promoted to consort, and although at this point she still had no children with the Qianlong Emperor, he doted on her and described her as "gentle and beautiful". On 10 August 1756, when she was almost 29 years old, she gave birth to his 7th daughter, Princess Hejing. Consort Ling later gave birth to his 14th son, Yonglu, on 31 August 1757 (though he would die prematurely on 3 May 1760) and to his 9th daughter, Princess Heke, on 17 August 1758. On 3 February 1760, she was elevated to noble consort. On 13 November 1760, she gave birth to his 15th son, Yongyan.

On 13 January 1763, Consort Ling gave birth to the Qianlong Emperor's 16th son, who died prematurely on 6 May 1765. That same year, while on a tour to Hangzhou, Empress Nara fell out of favor and was sent back to the Forbidden City to be confined. The real reason behind her downfall remains the subject of debate. Whatever happened, when the imperial entourage returned to the Forbidden City, Empress Nara was stripped of her power and, on 28 July, Consort Ling was promoted to imperial noble consort. On 17 June 1766, she gave birth to Qianlong's 17th son, Yonglin.

On 19 August 1766, Empress Nara died of illness, but a new empress was not designated. However, Consort Ling, who held the highest rank among all of the consorts, was placed in charge of the palace and served competently. Her duties as the de facto empress were guiding rites at the ancestral altar, evaluating the personnel, approving budgets, supervising the education of the princes, and planning all imperial marriages. She also regularly met with eunuchs, female officials, the emperor's other consorts, imperial princesses (including her two daughters), and emperor Qianlong, whom she accompanied on his excursions to Mount Tai, Jehol and the areas south of the Yangtze River.

In 1773, Qianlong decided to secretly select the crown prince. Seven of his sons were living at the time, but he decided to choose Yongyan, who was hard-working, though not outstanding, and displayed humility. Despite these favorable circumstances, Consort Ling became increasingly ill over the years. On 9 February 1775, Princess Hejing died; the news worsened Consort Ling's condition.

=== Death ===
Consort Ling died at the age of 47 on 28 February of 1775, less than a month after her elder daughter's death. On 12 March of that same year, she was granted the posthumous name "Imperial Noble Consort Lingyi". On 19 November, her coffin was interred in the Yu Mausoleum of the Eastern Qing tombs after a grand funeral far more regal than that of an imperial noble consort.

On 9 February 1796, Qianlong posthumously elevated her to "Empress Xiaoyi", announced Yongyan as the new emperor, and became a retired emperor. After Qianlong's death on 7 February 1799, Jiaqing honoured his mother with the posthumous title "Empress Xiaoyichun" and had her reburied at the right side of Qianlong's burial place, while his first primary wife, Empress Xiaoxianchun, was buried on his left side.

After the Yu Mausoleum's grave robbery occurred in 1928, it was revealed that Empress Xiaoyichun's remains were well-preserved during inspection.

== Titles ==
- During the reign of the Yongzheng Emperor (r. 1722–1735):
  - Lady Wei (魏氏)
- During the reign of the Qianlong Emperor (r. 1735–1796):
  - Noble Lady (貴人; from 1745), sixth rank imperial consort
  - Concubine Ling (令嬪; from 9 December 1745), fifth rank imperial consort
  - Consort Ling (令妃; from 20 May 1749), fourth rank imperial consort
  - Noble Consort Ling (令貴妃; from 3 February 1760), third rank imperial consort
  - Imperial Noble Consort (皇貴妃; from 28 July 1765), second rank imperial consort
  - Imperial Noble Consort Lingyi (令懿皇貴妃; from 12 March 1775)
  - Empress Xiaoyi (孝儀皇后; from 1796)
- During the reign of the Jiaqing Emperor (r. 1796–1820):
  - Empress Xiaoyichun (孝儀純皇后; from 1799)

== Issue ==
- As Consort Ling:
  - Princess Hejing of the First Rank (固倫和靜公主; 10 August 1756 – 9 February 1775), the Qianlong Emperor's seventh daughter
    - Married Lhawang Dorji (拉旺多爾濟; 1754–1816), of the Mongol Khalkha Borjigin clan in August/September 1770
  - Yonglu (永璐; 31 August 1757 – 3 May 1760), the Qianlong Emperor's 14th son
  - Princess Heke of the Second Rank (和碩和恪公主; 17 August 1758 – 14 December 1780), the Qianlong Emperor's ninth daughter
    - Married Jalantai (札蘭泰; ? – 1788), of the Manchu Uya clan in August/September 1772
  - Stillbirth at eight months (13 November 1759)
- As Noble Consort Ling:
  - Yongyan (顒琰), Emperor Renzong of Qing (清仁宗; 13 November 1760 – 2 September 1820), the Qianlong Emperor's 15th son; enthroned on 9 February 1796 as the Jiaqing Emperor (嘉慶帝)
  - Unnamed son (13 January 1763 – 6 May 1765), the Qianlong Emperor's 16th son
- As the Imperial Noble Consort:
  - Yonglin (永璘), Prince Qingxi of the First Rank (慶僖親王; 17 June 1766 – 25 April 1820), the Qianlong Emperor's 17th son

== Gallery ==
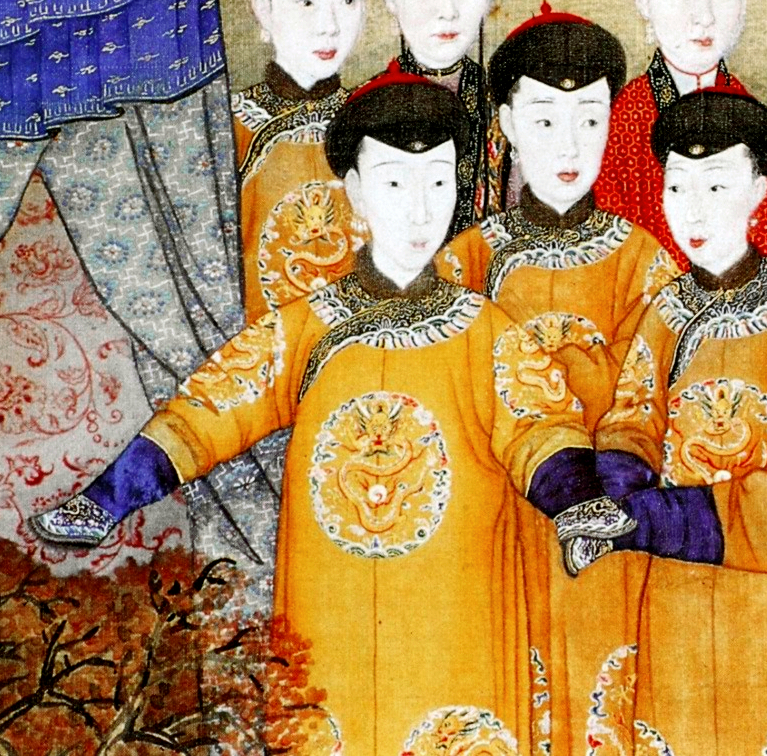
In ceremonial dress

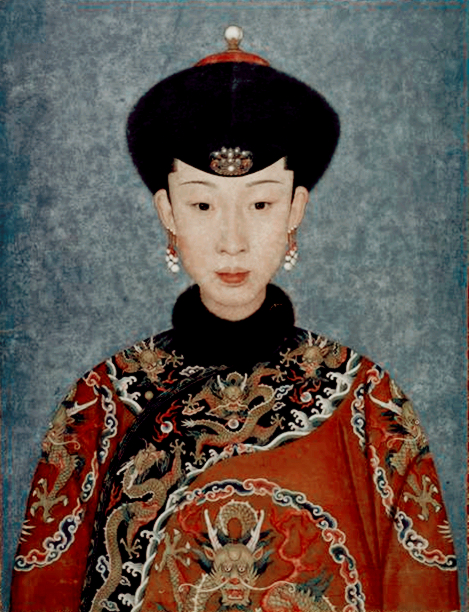
In ceremonial dress

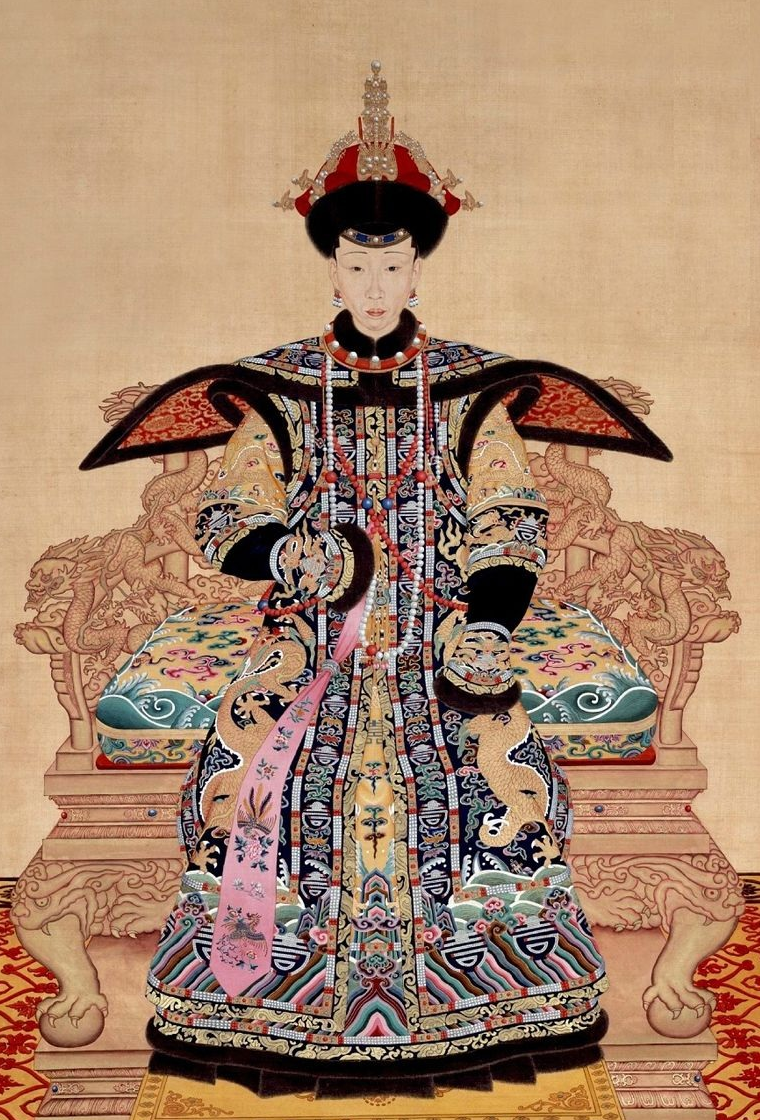
In court dress

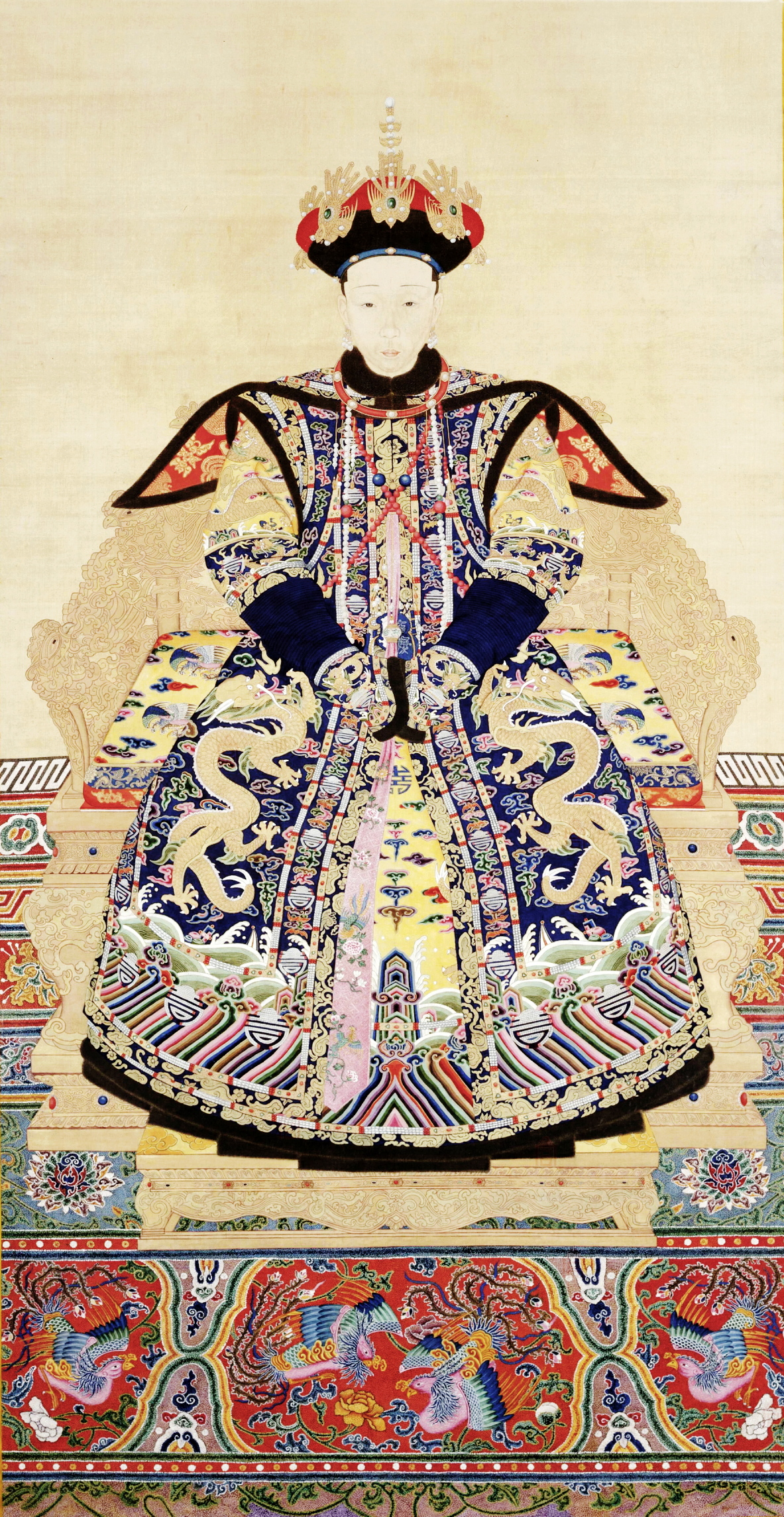
In court dress

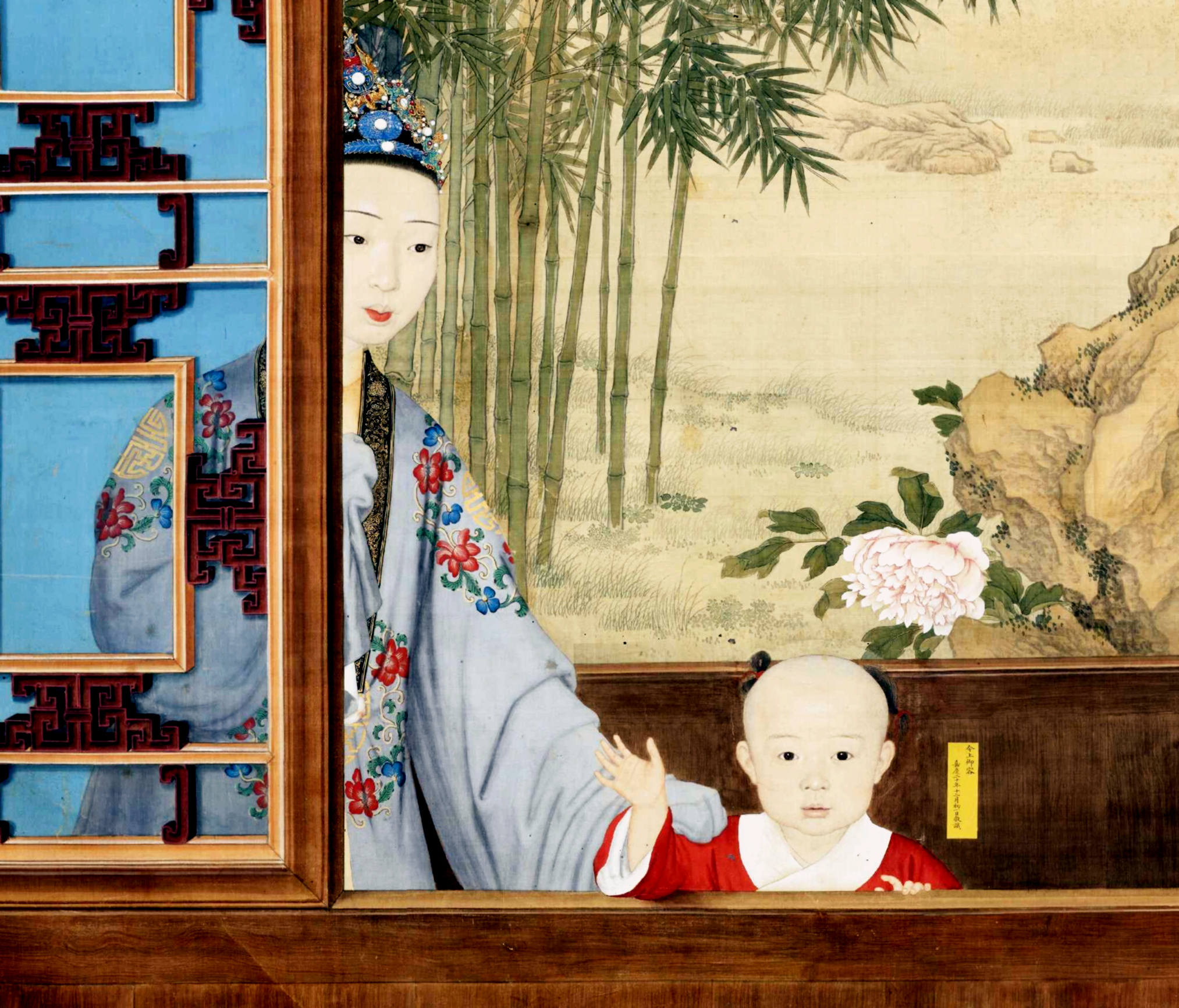
In daily dress, with the young Jiaqing Emperor. Debates about the identity of the lady are still ongoing and it has been suggested that she might be Imperial Noble Consort Qinggong, one of the Qianlong Emperor's childless concubines who raised Yongyan.

== In popular culture ==
- Portrayed by Chan Tik-wah in The Rise and Fall of Qing Dynasty (1988)
- Portrayed by Zhao Lijuan in My Fair Princess (1998)
- Portrayed by Chen Li in My Fair Princess III (2003)
- Portrayed by Sharon Chan in Word Twisters' Adventures (2007)
- Portrayed by Liu Xiaoye in New My Fair Princess (2011)
- Portrayed by Wu Jinyan in Story of Yanxi Palace (2018) and Yanxi Palace: Princess Adventures (2019)
- Portrayed by Li Chun in Ruyi's Royal Love in the Palace (2018)

== See also ==
- Imperial Chinese harem system
- Imperial and noble ranks of the Qing dynasty
