= Concubine Yi (Qianlong) =

Consort of Qianlong Emperor (died 1736)

- Died: 1 November 1735; Forbidden City, Beijing
- Spouse: Qianlong Emperor (m. 1727)
Posthumous name
- Concubine Yi
- House: Huang (黄氏; by birth); Aisin-Gioro (by marriage)
- Father: Daimin

Concubine Yi
- Traditional Chinese: 儀嬪
- Simplified Chinese: 仪嫔
Transcriptions
Standard Mandarin
- Hanyu Pinyin: Yí Pín

Concubine Yi (? – 1 November 1736), of the Han Chinese Plain Yellow Banner, was a consort of Qianlong Emperor.

== Life ==
=== Family background ===
Concubine Yi was a Han Chinese Booi Aha of Plain Yellow Banner. Her ancestral home was in Suzhou.

- Father: Daimin, a seventh rank military official in Imperial Gardens (七品圆明园额外副总领)
  - Paternal grandfather: Fogongbao (佛公保), a fifth rank literary official (郎中)
    - Paternal uncle: Alin, a third rank military official

=== Yongzheng era ===
In 1727, Lady Huang entered Prince Bao's Mansion, the residence of Hongli, as a mistress. She was versed in embroidery, weaving and Confucian philosophy ("Rules of a Woman" and "The Principles of Self-Discipline").

=== Qianlong era ===
After Hongli's ascension as the Qianlong Emperor, Lady Huang was granted the rank of concubine (嫔) and her family's status was raised from xinzheku (辛者庫) to booi aha. In October 1735, Lady Huang fell ill while Empress Fuca, Noble Consort Gao and other imperial consorts visited the Tiancun Funeral Palace. Lady Huang died on 1 November 1736. She was posthumously honoured as "Concubine Yi" (仪嫔; "yi" meaning "righteous").

== Titles ==
- During the reign of the Kangxi Emperor (r. 1661–1722):
  - Lady Huang (黄氏)
- During the reign of the Yongzheng Emperor (r. 1722–1735):
  - Mistress (格格; from 1727)
- During the reign of the Qianlong Emperor (r. 1735–1796):
  - Concubine (嫔; from 1735), fifth rank imperial consort
  - Concubine Yi (仪嫔; from 1736)

== In popular culture ==
- Portrayed by Xu Baihui in Story Of Yanxi palace (2017)
- Portrayed by Han Dantong in Ruyi's Royal Love in the Palace (2018)

== See also ==
- Imperial Chinese harem system#Qing
- Royal and noble ranks of the Qing dynasty
