= Princess Hejing =

Princess Hejing may refer to:

- Princess Hejing (1731–1792) (Chinese: 固倫和敬公主), Qianlong Emperor's third daughter
- Princess Hejing (1756–1775) (Chinese: 固倫和靜公主), Qianlong Emperor's seventh daughter
