= Praise to Tara in Twenty One Verses =

Traditional prayer in Tibetan Buddhism

Praise to Tara in Twenty One Verses is a traditional prayer in Tibetan Buddhism to the female Bodhisattva Tara (Sanskrit: तारा, tārā; Tibetan སྒྲོལ་མ, Drolma) also known as Ārya Tārā, or Jetsun Dolma (Wylie: rje btsun sgrol ma). The text is originally a Sanskrit Indian Buddhist work, and it is the most popular prayer to Tara in Tibetan Buddhism.

The Praise appears in the Derge Kangyur as "“Offering Praise to Tara through Twenty-One [verses] of Homage” (Wylie: sgrol ma la phyag 'tshal ba nyi shu gcig gis bstod pa)." The prayer is found in all four traditions of Tibetan Buddhism.

== Translations ==
An early manuscript version, titled Twenty-One Hymns to the Rescuer Mother of Buddhas (二十一種救度佛母贊), described as an "Imperially commissioned translation of the hymn to the rescuer mother of Buddhas ... in Manchu, Tibetan, Mongolian, and Chinese scripts", was created in the late 18th century by calligrapher Yongrong 永瑢 (1744–1790). It is held by the National Library of China.

== Commentaries ==
Modern English language commentaries include 2007 works by Palden Sherab, and by Adeu Rinpoche and Urgyen Rinpoche a 2005 work by Thubten Chodron, a 1999 work by Bokar Rinpoche, and a 1992 work by Martin Willson.

Online commentaries include a 1997 commentary by Khempo Yurmed Tinly Rinpoche, a 2004 commentary by Palden Sherab, and a 2013 commentary by Geshe Dawö.

Extensive descriptions of traditional rituals associated with Tara, including the "Twenty-One Praises", can be found in Steven V. Beyer's 1978 book, The cult of Tārā: magic and ritual in Tibet.

In the commentarial literature, each of the verses is associated with different emanations of Tara, which have a specific mantra with which she is associated, offering protection from various types of fears, harm, and calamities.
