= Yongrong =

Qing dynasty prince and calligrapher (1744–1790)

Yongrong 永瑢
- Prince Zhi of the First Rank (和碩質親王)
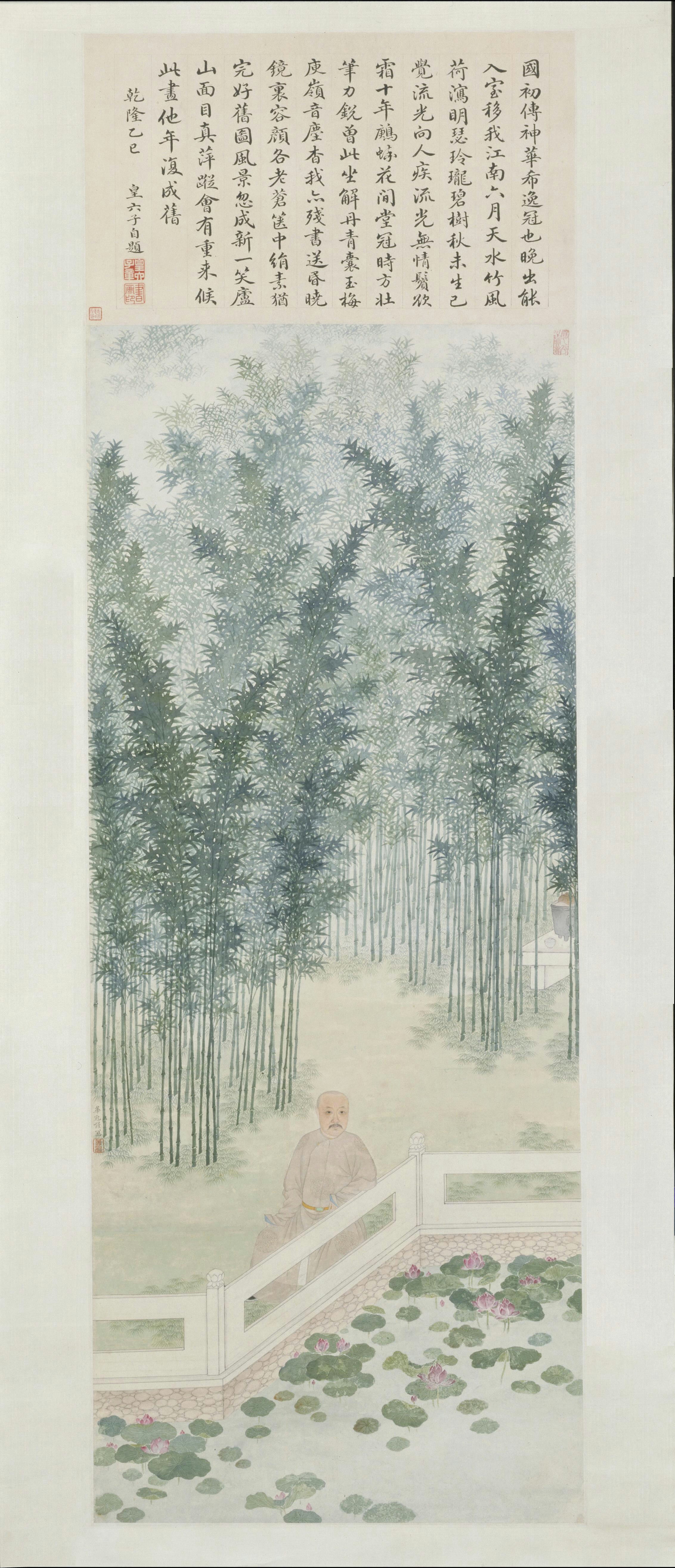
- Portrait by Hua Guan, 1785

Prince Zhi of the First Rank
- Tenure: 21 December 1789 – 13 June 1790
- Predecessor: Yunxi
- Successor: Mianqing
- Born: 28 January 1744
- Died: 13 June 1790 (aged 46)
- Consorts: Lady Fuca; Lady Niohuru
- Issue: Miancong; Mianqing, Prince Zhike of the Second Rank; Princess of the Fourth Rank
Names
- Aisin Gioro Yongrong (愛新覺羅·永瑢)
Posthumous name
- Prince Zhizhuang of the First Rank (質莊親王)
- House: Aisin Gioro
- Father: Qianlong Emperor
- Mother: Imperial Noble Consort Chunhui

Yongrong
- Chinese: 永瑢
Transcriptions
Standard Mandarin
- Hanyu Pinyin: Yǒngróng
- Wade–Giles: Yung-jung

Yongrong (28 January 1744 – 13 June 1790) was a Manchu prince and calligrapher of the Qing dynasty in China. He was born in the Aisin Gioro clan as the sixth son of the Qianlong Emperor; his mother was Imperial Noble Consort Chunhui.

== Biography ==
In 1759, he was adopted into the lineage of his granduncle Yunxi (允禧; 1711–1758) as Yunxi's grandson, because Yunxi had no son to inherit his Prince Shen peerage. Yongrong was made a beile in the same year. In 1772, he was promoted to junwang (second-rank prince) as "Prince Zhi of the Second Rank" (質郡王). In 1789, he was further promoted to qinwang (first-rank prince), as "Prince Zhi of the First Rank" (質親王). He died in 1790 and was posthumously honoured as "Prince Zhizhuang of the First Rank" (質莊親王).

He was succeeded by his fifth son, Mianqing.

=== Artist ===
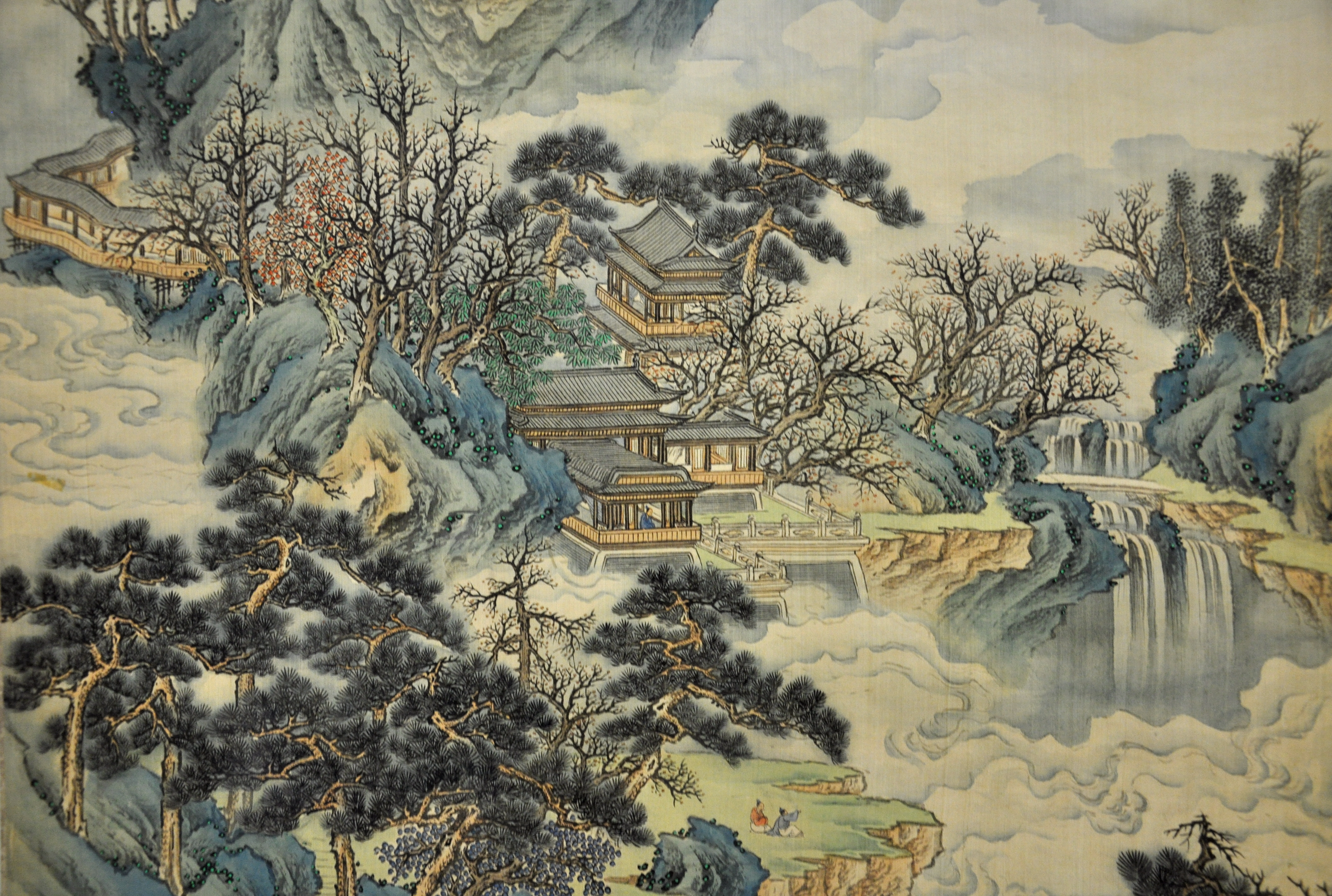
Detail of a painting "Paradisiacal Landscape", 18th century, dedicated to his father the Qianlong Emperor

Yongrong is best known for his work as a general editor of the Siku Quanshu, and for his calligraphy in the manuscript Twenty-One Hymns to the Rescuer Mother of Buddhas (二十一種救度佛母贊). He was also a poet and painter of Chinese paintings with landscape painting as his focus, with knowledge of astronomy and mathematics.

== Family ==
Primary Consort

- Imperial Princess Consort Zhizhuang, of the Fuca clan (質莊亲王福晋 富察氏, d. March 1772)
  - Miancong (綿聰; 22 March 1766 – 15 August 1780), first son
  - Second daughter (5 February 1768 – 8 February 1768)
  - Mian'ai (綿愛; 22 February 1769 – 8 September 1771), second son
  - Fourth daughter (3 October 1770 – 20 September 1779)
- Step Imperial Princess Consort Zhizhuang, of the Niohuru clan (質莊亲王继福晋 鈕祜祿氏)
  - Mianxin (綿信; 14 August 1775 – 25 November 1777), fourth son
  - Princess of the Fourth Rank (縣主; b. 1 September 1776), fifth daughter
    - Married Deqin (德欽) of the Aohan in January/February 1793
  - Mianqing, Prince Zhike of the Second Rank (質恪郡王 綿慶; 17 June 1779 – 27 November 1804), fifth son

Secondary Consort

- Secondary consort, of the You clan (側福晉 尤氏)
  - First daughter (20 March 1766 – 27 November 1769)
  - Third daughter (23 July 1769 – 7 July 1770)
  - Mianci (綿慈; 21 December 1770 – 23 May 1773), third son

Concubine

- Mistress, of the Geng clan (耿氏)
  - Mianyi (綿意; 12 May 1787 – 12 June 1792), sixth son

== In fiction and popular culture ==
- Portrayed by Zhou Yicheng in Story of Yanxi Palace (2018)
- Portrayed by Zhang Jinze in Ruyi's Royal Love in the Palace (2018)

== See also ==
- Prince Shen
- Royal and noble ranks of the Qing dynasty § Male members
- Ranks of imperial consorts in China § Qing
