= Mianqing =

- Prince Zhi of the Second Rank (多羅質郡王)

Prince Zhi of the Second Rank
- Tenure: 13 June 1790 – 27 November 1804
- Predecessor: Yongrong
- Successor: Yiqi
- Born: 17 June 1779
- Died: 27 November 1804 (aged 25)
- Spouse: Lady Niohuru
- Issue: Yiqi
Posthumous name
- Prince Zhike of the Second Rank (質恪郡王)
- House: Aisin Gioro
- Father: Yongrong
- Mother: Lady Niohuru

Mianqing (綿慶; 17 June 1779 – 27 November 1804) was Yongrong's fifth son and Qianlong Emperor's grandson. Mianqing was the third in Prince Shen peerage and the second holder of Prince Zhi of the Second Rank title.

== Life ==
Mianqing was born on 17 June 1779 to second primary princess consort Zhizhuang of the First Rank, lady Niohuru. Mianqing also had one biological sister, Princess of the Fourth Rank.

Mianqing was talented since young and showed interest for art, especially for music. He was taught archery by his grandfather personally. His talent for archery was shown off during the imperial hunt in Rehe in 1793. Mianqing killed a wild boar with only 3 arrows. Although Mianqing was injured, Qianlong Emperor was pleased having been informed about Mianqing's action and granted him three-eyed peacock feathers and yellow horse-riding jacket.

Mianqing succeeded his father as Prince Zhi of the Second Rank in 1790, being barely 11 years old. In 1802, prince consort Fengshenyinde described the relationship of Helin and Mianqing, largely concerning the long-lasting colligation between the clans. Alternative view of the colligation presented Heshen, commenting that before Helin died of malaria in 1796, he had been reciting the memorials to a group consisting of 15 people expressing deep grievance through "unclearly pronounced words" comparable to "slightly falling brush, song becoming crying cloud (Note: The interpretation of "哭云" is rain)".

Mianqing died on 27 November 1804 because of progressing effects of his injury. Jiaqing Emperor was deeply saddened by his death and therefore gave his descendants 5000 taels of silver for a funeral.

Mianqing was posthumously honoured as Prince Zhi Ke of the Second Rank (質恪郡王, meaning: "talented and respectful") and succeeded by his sole son, Yiqi.

== Family ==
Mianqing was married to lady Niohuru, daughter of Helin (和琳) and niece of Heshen, infamous late Qianlong era official.

- Princess Consort Zhike of the Second Rank, of the Niohuru clan (質恪郡王福晋 钮祜禄氏)
  - Princess of the Fourth Rank (县主, b. 1799)
    - Married Salashen (萨拉神) in 1819
- Secondary consort, of the Irgen Gioro clan (侧福晋伊 尔根觉罗氏)
  - Prince of the Third Rank Yiqi (多罗贝勒奕绮; 20 June 1802 - 3 July 1842)
