= Jiangshan Weizhong =

- Also known as: The Great Qing Empire
- 江山为重 / 大清帝国
- Genre: Historical drama
- Written by: Jing Quan
- Directed by: Jing Quan
- Starring: Wu Jing; Fan Bingbing; Chen Yi; Fu Chong; Xu Huanshan; Liu Guanxiong; Wei Zongwan
- Country of origin: China
- Original language: Mandarin
- No. of episodes: 31

Production
- Producer: Zhao Ruiyong
- Production location: China
- Running time: ≈45 minutes per episode

Original release
- Release: 2 December 2002

Jiangshan Weizhong (江山为重; "Prioritise the Interests of the Empire"), also known as The Great Qing Empire (大清帝国), is a 2002 Chinese historical television series based on legends about the Yongzheng and Qianlong Emperors of the Qing dynasty. The series was first broadcast in mainland China in December 2002.

== Synopsis ==
The series is set in 18th-century China during the reign of the Yongzheng Emperor of the Qing dynasty. The emperor's harsh and brutal policies lead to widespread discontent and dissension. Meanwhile, a secret death squad, named after their dreaded weapon — the flying guillotine — goes around assassinating the emperor's enemies.

The crown prince, Hongli, travels incognito to Jiangnan, where he evades assassination attempts orchestrated by nobles plotting to seize the throne, and uncovers a shocking truth about his birth and origin. Besides, he meets and befriends two maidens, Lü Siniang and Yuniang, who turn out to be seeking revenge on the Yongzheng Emperor. Lü Siniang is the granddaughter of Lü Liuliang, whose family was executed by the emperor. She has trained under Princess Changping, a princess of the fallen Ming dynasty.

== Cast ==
- Wu Jing as Hongli / Chen Bangguo
- Fan Bingbing as Lü Siniang
- Chen Yi as Lady Fuca
- Fu Chong as Yuniang
- Xu Huanshan as the Kangxi Emperor
- Liu Guanxiong as the Yongzheng Emperor
- Yang Hongwu as Yinti
- Wei Zongwan as Chen Shiguan
- Zhou Xianzhen as Chen Shiguan's wife
- Li Li as Lady Niohuru
- Lou Yonghuan as Zhaohui
