= Princess Hejing (born 1756) =

Qing dynasty princess

Princess Hejing of the First Rank 固倫和靜公主
- Born: 10 August 1756; Old Summer Palace, Imperial City, Beijing
- Died: 9 February 1775 (aged 18); Beijing
- Burial: Chaoyang District, Beijing
- Spouse: Lhawang Dorji
- House: Aisin-Gioro (by birth); Khalkha Borjigin (by marriage)
- Father: Qianlong Emperor
- Mother: Empress Xiaoyichun

Princess Hejing
- Traditional Chinese: 固倫和靜公主
- Simplified Chinese: 固伦和静公主
Transcriptions
Standard Mandarin
- Hanyu Pinyin: Gúlùn Héjìng Gōngzhǔ

Princess Hejing of the First Rank (固倫和靜公主; 10 August 1756 – 9 February 1775), was a princess of the First Rank of the Qing dynasty. A member of royal family of Qing Dynasty, she was the 1st daughter and 1st child of her mother, the then Consort Ling and later, posthumously Empress Xiaoyichun, and was the 7th daughter and 20th child of her father Qianlong Emperor.

== Early years ==
Princess Hejing was the Qianlong Emperor's 7th daughter. Her mother was Consort Ling, posthumously Empress Xiaoyichun. She was born in the Hall of Five Fortunes, inside the Old Summer Palace.

She temporarily resided in the Xichun Garden because her manor had not been completely finished. Her residence used to be the mansion of the minister Gao Heng, a brother of the Imperial Noble Consort Huixian.

== Marriage and Title ==
In 1761, when the Eight Banners army captured the Mongolian Dzungars, Lhawang Dorji was chosen as Princess Hejing's prince consort (额驸; pinyin: efu) and sent to Beijing. He was the 7th grandson of Princess Chunque of the First Rank, the Kangxi Emperor's 10th daughter, and her husband Celing. His father, Chenggunzhabu, participated in military campaigns of Qing and held the title of jasagh. On August 1770, at the age of 14, Princess Heijing was bestowed the title "Princess Hejing of the First Rank" and married Lhawang Dorji. Their wedding ceremony took place at the Palace of Brightness and Justice inside the Old Summer Palace.

According to the imperial tradition, only the daughters of the empress could be given a title of 1st-ranking princess (gurun), but an exception was made for two reasons. At that time, her mother was an imperial noble consort who served as the de facto empress because she held the highest rank among the emperor's consorts. Moreover, Princess Hejing was Imperial Noble Consort Ling's 1st daughter, and Qianlong wanted to show his friendship with Lhawang Dorji.

== Life in Mongolia ==
After the wedding, Princess Hejing and Lhawang Dorji relocated to Mongolia, a common practice for Qing princesses married to Mongolian nobles. This move was part of the Qing strategy to integrate Mongolian elites into the empire through marital alliances. In November 1771, Hejing traveled to Tamir, accompanied by a consort of Chenggunzhab, possibly her mother-in-law. The journey was planned to return to Beijing in the spring, as the harsh winter conditions in Khalkha (a region in Mongolia) made prolonged stays challenging.

== Death ==
She died on 9 February 1775 at the age of 18, likely in Mongolia, although the exact cause of her death is not known.

== In popular culture ==
- Portrayed by Wang Herun in the Netflix series Yanxi Palace: Princess Adventures (2019), a sequel to Story of Yanxi Palace (2018).
- Portrayed by Jin Ziqi in the Chinese television series Ruyi's Royal Love in the Palace (2018)
