= Tan Zhuo =

Chinese actress

- Born: Changchun, China
- Occupation: Actress

Chinese name
- Traditional Chinese: 譚卓
- Simplified Chinese: 谭卓
Transcriptions
Standard Mandarin
- Hanyu Pinyin: Tán Zhuó

Tan Zhuo (simplified Chinese: 谭卓; traditional Chinese: 譚卓; pinyin: Tán Zhuó) is a Chinese television and film actress. She appeared in the films Spring Fever (2009, banned in China), Dying to Survive (2018, one of the highest-grossing films in China) and the 2018 TV series Story of Yanxi Palace.

== Filmography ==
=== Film ===
Year	English title	Chinese title	Role	Notes
2009	Spring Fever	春风沉醉的晚上	Li Jing	
2011	Hello! Mr. Tree	树先生	Xiao Mei	
2018	Dying to Survive	我不是药神	Liu Sihui	
2018	Last Letter	你好，之华	Ji Hong	
2018	The Kiss Addict			
2018	End of Summer	西小河的夏天	Huifang	
2018	Wrath of Silence			
2019	The Bravest	烈火英雄	Li Fang	
2019	Gone with the Light	被光抓走的人		
2019	Sheep Without a Shepherd	误杀	Ayu	

=== Television series ===
Year	English title	Chinese title	Role	Notes
2018	Story of Yanxi Palace	延禧攻略	Noble Consort Gao	
2019	The Legend of Haolan	皓镧传	Lady Huayang	
2020	Together	在一起		
