= Prince Shen =

Chinese aristocratic title

Prince Shen of the Second Rank
- Traditional Chinese: 多羅慎郡王
- Simplified Chinese: 多罗慎郡王
Transcriptions
Standard Mandarin
- Hanyu Pinyin: duōluó shèn jùnwáng
- Wade–Giles: to-lo shen chün-wang

Prince Zhi of the First Rank
- Traditional Chinese: 和碩質親王
- Simplified Chinese: 和硕质亲王
Transcriptions
Standard Mandarin
- Hanyu Pinyin: héshuò zhì qīnwáng
- Wade–Giles: ho-shuo chih ch'in-wang

Prince Shen of the Second Rank (Manchu: ᡩᠣᡵᠣᡳ
ᡤᡳᠩᡤᡠᠯᡝᡥᡝ
ᡤᡳᠶᡡᠨ
ᠸᠠᠩ; doroi ginggulehe giyūn wang), or simply Prince Shen, was the title of a princely peerage used in China during the Manchu-led Qing dynasty (1644–1912). It was renamed to "Prince Zhi of the Second Rank" in 1772 and upgraded to Prince Zhi of the First Rank (or simply Prince Zhi) in 1789.

Since the peerage was not awarded "iron-cap" status, this meant that each successive bearer of the title would normally start off with a title downgraded by one rank vis-à-vis that held by his predecessor. However, the title would generally not be downgraded to any lower than a feng'en fuguo gong except under special circumstances.

The first bearer of the title was Yunxi (允禧; 1711–1758), the 21st son of the Kangxi Emperor. In 1735, Yunxi was granted the title "Prince Shen of the Second Rank" by his nephew, the Qianlong Emperor. As his two sons died early, Yunxi adopted the Qianlong Emperor's sixth son, Yongrong (1744–1790), as his grandson. Yongrong inherited the peerage in 1772 as "Prince Zhi of the Second Rank" and was promoted to a qinwang (first-rank prince) in 1789. The title was passed down over eight generations and held by eight persons.

== Members of the Prince Shen peerage ==
=== Main line ===
Main line
- Yunxi (允禧; 1711 – 1758), the Kangxi Emperor's 21st son, initially a beizi (4th-rank prince), promoted to beile (3rd-rank prince), held the title Prince Shen of the Second Rank from 1735 to 1758, posthumously honoured as Prince Shen Jing of the Second Rank (慎靖郡王)
  - Hong'ang (弘昴; 1728 – 1742), Yunxi's first son
  - Hongxun (弘旬; 1731 – 1749), Yunxi's second son
  - (adoption)
    - Yongrong (1744 – 1790), the Qianlong Emperor's sixth son and adopted as Yunxi's grandson & heir, initially a beile (3rd-rank prince), promoted to second-rank prince in 1772, held the title Prince Zhi of the First Rank from 1789 to 1790, posthumously honoured as Prince Zhi Zhuang of the First Rank (質莊親王)
      - Mianqing (綿慶; 1779 – 1804), Yongrong's fifth son, succeeded & held the title as Prince Zhi of the Second Rank from 1790 to 1804, posthumously honoured as Prince Zhi Ke of the Second Rank (質恪郡王)
        - Yiqi (奕綺; 1802 – 1842), Mianqing's eldest son, succeeded & held the title of a beile (3rd-rank prince) from 1809 to 1839, stripped of his title in 1839, posthumously restored of his title in 1842
          - Zaihua (載華; 1829 – 1888), Yilun's (from Prince Cheng's peerage & adoptive Prince Lü's peerage) 11th son and adopted as Yiqi's heir & son, succeeded & held the title of a beizi (4th-rank prince) from 1845 to 1865, stripped of his title in 1865
            - Putai (溥泰; born 1848), Zaigang's eldest son and adopted as Zaihua's heir & son, initially a first class bulwark general from 1868 to 1882, promoted & succeeded as a grace defender duke in 1882, stripped of his title in 1883
            - Puling (溥齡; 1849 – 1897), Zaigang's second son and Putai's younger brother & successor, initially a first class bulwark general from 1872 to 1883, promoted & succeeded as a grace defender duke in 1883
              - Yuheng (毓亨; 1875–?), Puling's eldest son, succeeded & held the title of a grace defender duke from 1897

== Family tree ==
Family tree

Xuanye 玄燁 (1654–1722); Kangxi Emperor 康熙帝 (1661–1722)
Yinzhen 胤禛 (1678–1735); Yongzheng Emperor 雍正帝 (1722–1735)	Yunxi 允禧 (1711–1758); Prince Shenjing of the Second Rank 慎靖郡王 (1730–1758)
Hongli 弘曆 (1711–1799); Qianlong Emperor 乾隆帝 (1735–1796)
Yongrong 永瑢 (1744–1790); Prince Zhizhuang of the First Rank 質莊親王 (1789–1790)	Yongxing 永瑆 (1752–1823); Prince Chengzhe of the First Rank 成哲親王 (1789–1823)
Mianqing 綿慶 (1779–1804); Prince Zhike of the Second Rank 質恪郡王 (1790–1804)	Mianqin 綿懃 (1768–1820); Prince Cheng of the Second Rank 成郡王 (posthumously awarded)
Yiqi 奕綺 (1802–1842); Beile 貝勒 (1809–1839)	Yilun 奕綸 (1790–1836); Beile 貝勒 (1809–1835)
Zaihua 載華 (1829–1888); Beizi 貝子 (1845–1865) (stripped of his title)	Zaigang 載鋼 (1823–1882); Feng'en Zhenguo Gong 奉恩鎮國公 (1865–1882)
Putai 溥泰 (1848–?); Feng'en Zhenguo Gong 奉恩鎮國公 (1882–1883)	Puling 溥齡 (1849–1897); Feng'en Zhenguo Gong 奉恩鎮國公 (1883–1897)	Pulin 溥霖 (1852–1884); First Class Fuguo Jiangjun 一等輔國將軍 (1872–1884)	Puliang 溥量 (1866–?); Fuguo Jiangjun 輔國將軍 (1887–?)
Yuheng 毓亨 (1875–?); Feng'en Zhenguo Gong 奉恩鎮國公 (1897–?)

Legend:

adoption

== See also ==
- Royal and noble ranks of the Qing dynasty
