= Princess Heke =

Qing dynasty princess (1758–1780)

Princess Heke of the Second Rank
- Born: 17 August 1758; Beijing, Forbidden City
- Died: 14 December 1780 (aged 22); Beijing
- Burial: Chaoyang District, Beijing
- Spouse: Jalantai
- Issue: 1 daughter
- House: Aisin-Gioro (by birth); Uya (by marriage)
- Father: Qianlong Emperor
- Mother: Empress Xiaoyichun

Princess Heke
- Traditional Chinese: 和碩和恪公主
- Simplified Chinese: 和硕和恪公主
Transcriptions
Standard Mandarin
- Hanyu Pinyin: Héshuò Hékè Gōngzhǔ

Princess Heke of the Second Rank (和碩和恪公主; 17 August 1758 – 14 December 1780) was a Chinese princess of the second of the Qing dynasty, and the 9th daughter and 22nd child of Qianlong Emperor and the 2nd daughter and 3rd child of her mother, Empress Xiaoyichun.

== Early years ==
Princess Heke was born on 17 August 1758 in the Forbidden City Beijing. She was born as the 9th daughter and the 20th child of her father Qianlong Emperor and to the then Consort Ling, and later, posthumously Empress Xiaoyichun , but was raised by her foster mother Consort Shu of the Yehe-Nara clan.

== Marriage and Imperial Favor ==
Princess Heke married Jalantai (扎兰泰) of the Uya clan in 1771, when she was 14 and had one daughter who married Rinchen Dorji (林沁多尔济).

It seems that the Qianlong Emperor did not favor Princess Heke very much, as:

1. Heke's dowry upon marrying Jalantai (扎兰泰) of the Uya clan in 1771 was smaller than that of any of her sisters including her foster sister.
2. Heke never received the title of Princess of the First Rank, even though her mother was posthumously made Empress Xiaoyichun. According to tradition, Heke, as the daughter of an empress, should have been granted the title of Princess of the First Rank. Instead, she became the only princess in Qing dynasty who didn't die in infancy and whose biological mother was the empress but did not receive the title.

== Death ==
Heke died on 14 December 1780, aged 22 in Beijing and was buried in Chaoyang District, Beijing.

== In popular culture ==
- Portrayed by Chen Yuan'er in the Chinese television series Ruyi's Royal Love in the Palace (2018)
