= Imperial Noble Consort Qinggong =

Consort of the Qianlong Emperor (1724–1774)

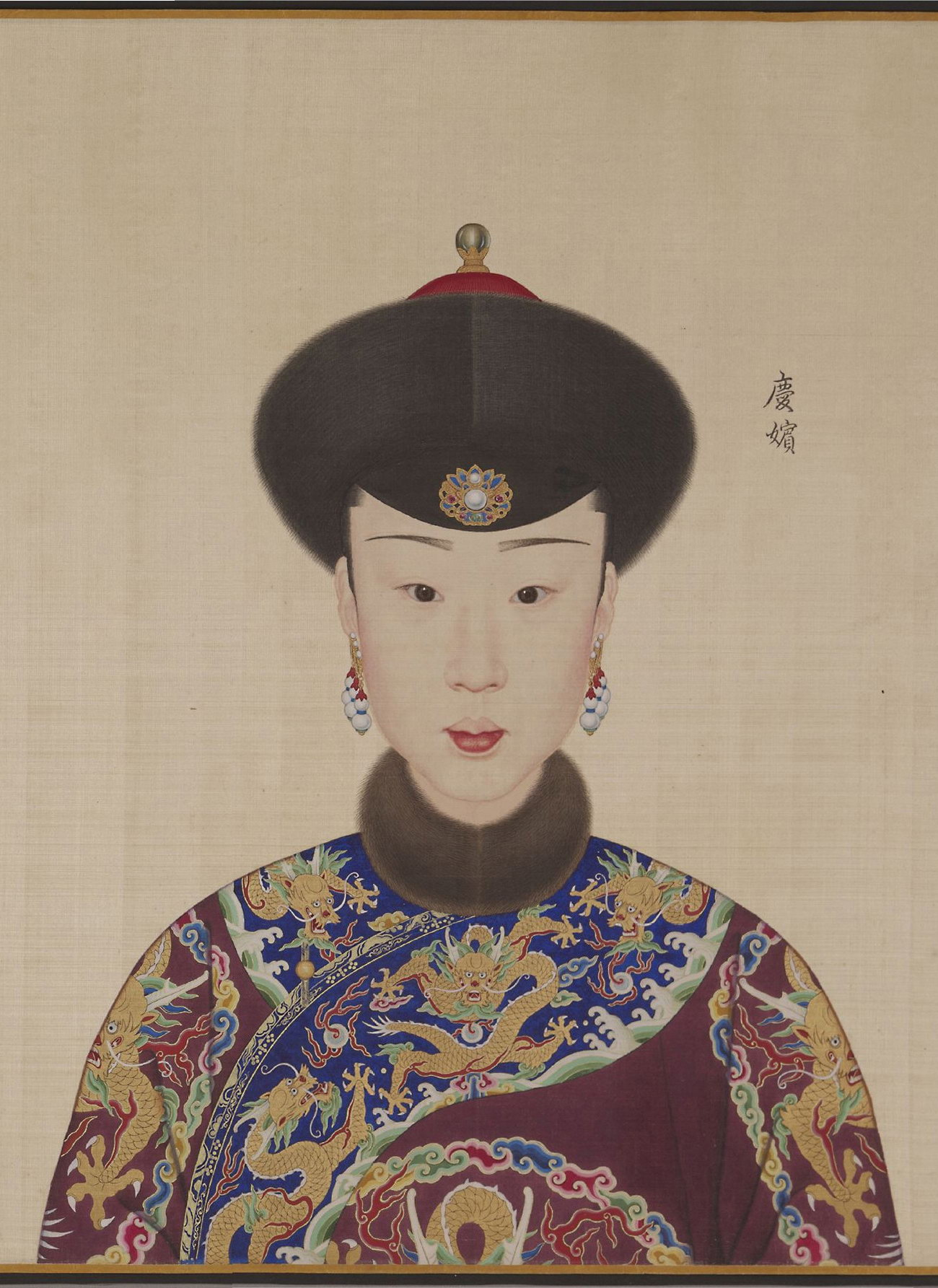
- Born: 12 August 1724 (雍正二年 六月 二十四日)
- Died: 21 August 1774 (aged 50) (乾隆三十九年 七月 十五日); Forbidden City
- Burial: Yu Mausoleum, Eastern Qing tombs
- Spouse: Qianlong Emperor (before 1774)
Posthumous name
- Imperial Noble Consort Qinggong (慶恭皇貴妃)
- House: Lu (陸; by birth); Aisin Gioro (by marriage)

Imperial Noble Consort Qinggong
- Traditional Chinese: 慶恭皇貴妃
- Simplified Chinese: 庆恭皇贵妃
Transcriptions
Standard Mandarin
- Hanyu Pinyin: Qìnggōng Huángguìfēi

Imperial Noble Consort Qinggong (12 August 1724 – 21 August 1774), of the Lu clan of Han ethnicity from the Bordered Yellow Banner, was a consort of the Qianlong Emperor of the Qing dynasty. She was 13 years his junior. Although her family was not a very prominent one, she rose to Noble Consort in her lifetime. Imperial Noble Consort Qinggong had no children of her own, but raised Prince Yongyan, the future Jiaqing Emperor.

== Life ==
=== Family background ===
Imperial Noble Consort Qinggong's personal name was not recorded in history.

- Father: Shilong (士隆)
- Four brothers

=== Yongzheng era ===
The future Imperial Noble Consort Qinggong was born on the 24th day of the sixth lunar month in the second year of the reign of the Yongzheng Emperor, which translates to 12 August 1724 in the Gregorian calendar.

=== Qianlong era ===
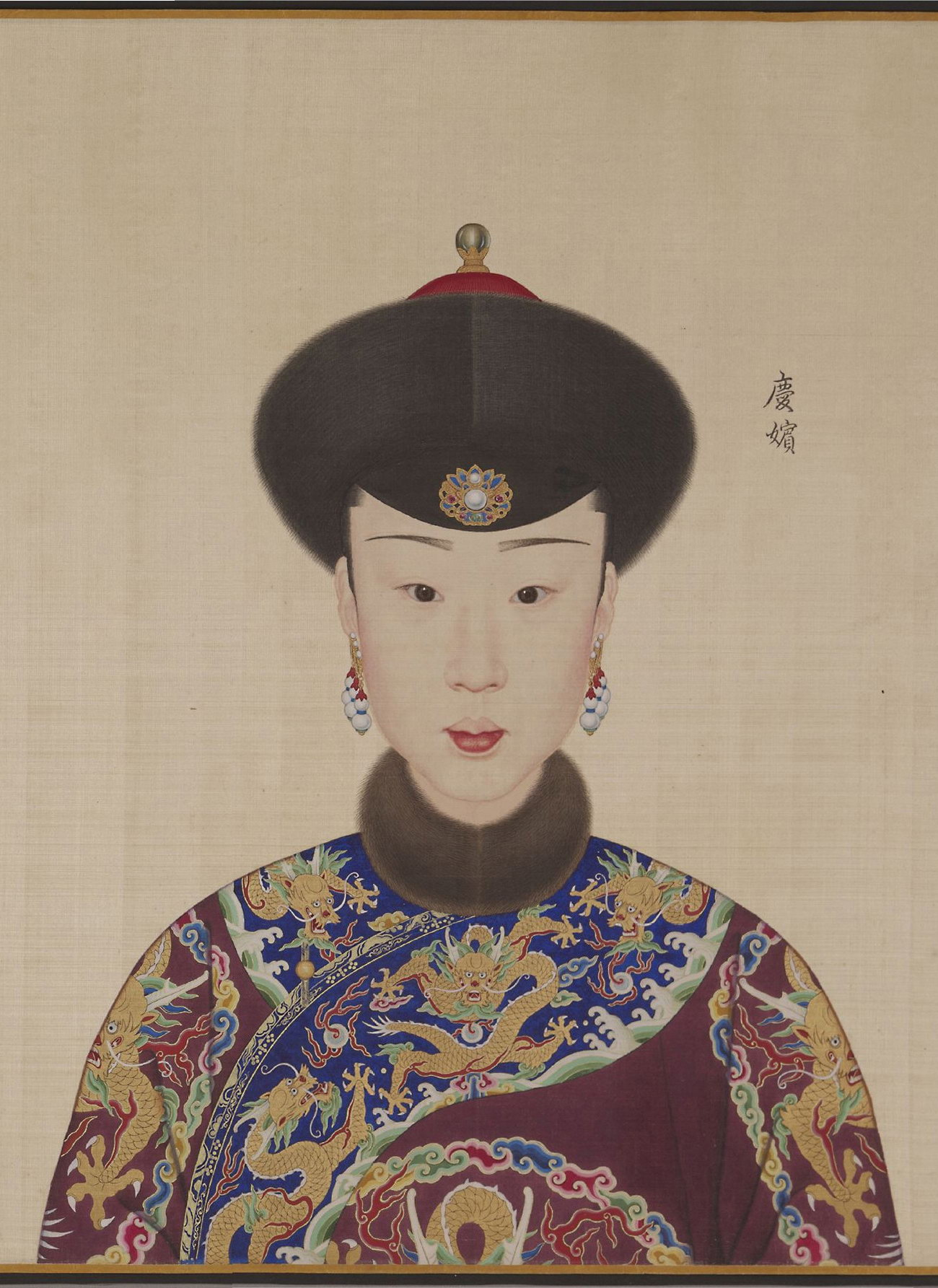
Imperial Noble Consort Qinggong

It is not known when Lady Lu entered the Forbidden City and was granted the title "First Attendant" by the Qianlong Emperor. She was elevated on 8 May 1748 to "Noble Lady", on 30 July 1751 to "Concubine Qing", and on 4 February 1760 to "Consort Qing".

In 1765, she joined the Qianlong Emperor and his other consorts on an inspection tour to the southern Yangtze delta region. On 14 November 1768, she was elevated to "Noble Consort Qing". She died on 21 August 1774 and was interred in the Yu Mausoleum of the Eastern Qing tombs.

=== Jiaqing era ===
On 9 February 1796, the Qianlong Emperor abdicated in favour of his 15th son, Yongyan, and became a Retired Emperor. As the Jiaqing Emperor was raised by Lady Lu in his childhood, he felt grateful to her, so after the Qianlong Emperor died on 7 February 1799, he posthumously elevated her to "Imperial Noble Consort Qinggong".

== Titles ==
- During the reign of the Yongzheng Emperor (r. 1722–1735):
  - Lady Lu (from 12 August 1724)
- During the reign of the Qianlong Emperor (r. 1735–1796):
  - First Attendant Lu (陸常在), seventh rank consort
  - Noble Lady Lu (陸貴人; from 8 May 1748), sixth rank consort
  - Concubine Qing (慶嬪; from 30 July 1751), fifth rank consort
  - Consort Qing (慶妃; from 4 February 1760), fourth rank consort
  - Noble Consort Qing (慶貴妃; from 14 November 1768), third rank consort
- During the reign of the Jiaqing Emperor (r. 1796–1820):
  - Imperial Noble Consort Qinggong (慶恭皇貴妃; from 8 February 1799), second rank consort

== In fiction and popular culture ==
- Portrayed by Au Oi-ling in The Rise and Fall of Qing Dynasty (1988).
- Portrayed by Yu Yang in Ruyi's Royal Love in the Palace (2018). Her maiden name is Lu Muping.
- Portrayed by Li Ruoning in Story of Yanxi Palace (2018). Her maiden name is Lu Wanwan.

== See also ==
- Ranks of imperial consorts in China § Qing
- Royal and noble ranks of the Qing dynasty
