= Khempo Yurmed Tinly Rinpoche =

Nyingma scholar, teacher, and lineage holder

Khempo Yurmed Tinly Rinpoche (1950–2005): Nyingma scholar, teacher, and lineage holder.

Khempo was born in 1950 in Kham, Eastern Tibet and was recognized as a reincarnate tulku by Nyoshul Lungtok Tulku. He received his training from the Mindrolling, Dzogchen, Palyul, and Tsopema monasteries in India under teachers such as Khochhen Rinpoche, Khenpo Tsuundru Rinpoche, Khenpo Rabgye Rinpoche, Dzongnang Rinpoche, and Mindrolling Trichen Rinpoche. Upon completion of his monastic training, Khempo received his master's degree from the Sanskrit University in Varanasi, India. Dudjom Rinpoche then appointed Khempo to lead the Nyingma studies program at Benares University in India. Khempo subsequently became Abbot of Bhutan's Gangteng Monastery shedra as well as Abbot of the Zilnon Kagyeling Monastery in Dharamsala, India. In 2000, Khempo was selected to represent the Nyingma school of Tibetan Buddhism at the United Nations Millennium World Peace Summit. He died in January 2005 while visiting his family in India.

== Bibliography ==
- Portraits of Tibetan Buddhist Masters by Don Farber
