= Yunxi (prince) =

- Prince Shen of the Second Rank 多羅慎郡王
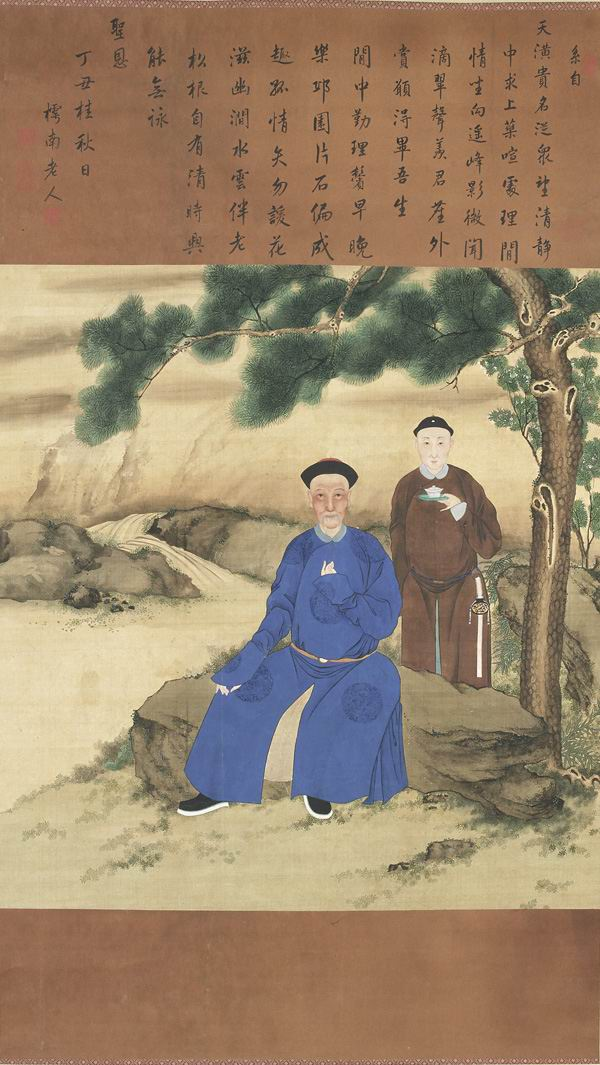

Prince Shen of the Second Rank
- Tenure: 14 November 1735 – 26 June 1758
- Predecessor: peerage created
- Successor: Yongrong
- Born: Yinxi (胤禧); 27 February 1711
- Died: 26 June 1758 (aged 47)
- Spouse: Lady Zugiya
- Issue: Hong'ang, Hongxun
Posthumous name
- Prince Shenjing of the Second Rank (慎靖郡王)
- House: Aisin Gioro
- Father: Kangxi Emperor
- Mother: Concubine Xi, lady Chen

Yunxi (允禧; 27 February 1711 – 26 June 1758) was Kangxi Emperor's 21st surviving son and the first Prince Shen of the Second Rank. Due to his age, Yunxi was not embroiled in the succession war among Kangxi Emperor's sons. Yunxi belonged to the most notable artists of the Qing dynasty.

== Life ==
=== Early years ===
Yunxi was born on 27 February 1711 to lady Chen, Noble Lady Qian (倩贵人). Due to vast disproportion in the age of the representatives of his generation, he would normally belong to "hong" generation as he was born on the same year as Qianlong Emperor. In 1722, his mother was promoted to concubine Xi (熙嫔).

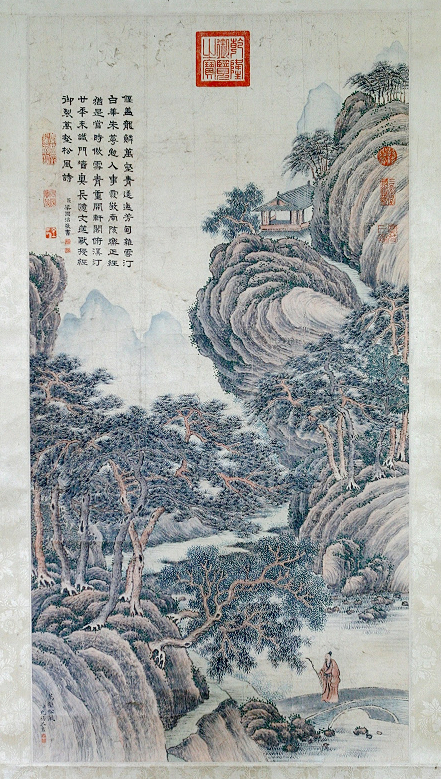
“Wind in Ten Thousand Pine gully"

=== Affiliation with art ===
Yunxi was one of the most excellent Kangxi Emperor's sons due to his talent for arts and diligence in studies. Most of Yunxi's paintings used Gongbi technique following the school of Dong Yuan and Wen Zhengming, one of the most renowned Ming dynasty artists. Actually, Yunxi's artworks exceed from the definition of monochromy using great palette of colours, as shown on the painting "Wind in Ten Thousand Pine gully" ("万壑松风"). Therefore, Yunxi was considered the best painter of the Kangxi-Qianlong eras imperial court. Yunxi was befriended with imperial court artists, such as Giuseppe Castiglione and Zheng Xie. Moreover, he associated himself with numerous taoist priests and buddhist monks and pursued meditation. That relationship with monks was exposed on his paintings by the depiction of taoist monk in purple clothes. Yunxi was also known to engage himself in poetry. Apart from writing poems on art works, Yunxi wrote a cycle of poems "Poetry from Huajian hall".

=== Political career ===
Yunxi kept low profile during succession brawl among his brothers largely due to his young age (barely 11 years). In 1730, Yunxi was granted a title of Prince of the Fourth Rank. He was promoted to Prince of the Third Rank on the same year. In 1735, Qianlong Emperor gave him a title of Prince Shen of the Second Rank, appointed as a commander of Han Chinese Plain Yellow Banner forces and praised him in his decree:

幼好读书, 识见明晰, 办理旗物亦属妥协, 朕意欲封为郡王. "Versed in literature since young, adequately reasoning, properly managing the affairs of his banner, therefore deserving a title of the Prince of the Second Rank in Our opinion"

Yunxi kept neutrality during Coup of Hongxi, despite one of his brothers was implicated in the case. He held an official position in the Ministry of Revenue

In 1748, Yunxi's princely seal was stolen and sold by merchant in Jiangxi. According to Mr. Mark Peter St. Nicholas, this accident was one of the numerous cases of forgery in Qing dynasty.

Yunxi died on 26 June 1758 and was posthumously honoured as Prince Shenjing of the Second Rank (多罗慎靖郡王, meaning "prudent and tranquil").

== Names ==
=== Courtesy name ===
- Qianzhai (谦斋), meaning "amiable student"

=== Art name ===
- Ziqiong daoren (紫琼道人), meaning "purple jade monk"
- Chunfu Jiushi (春浮居士), meaning "Spring-like pure scholar"

== Family ==
Yunxi was married to lady Zugiya, daughter of fourth rank military official Jianqi (建器). His primary consort had undergone selection together with future Empress Xiaoxianchun, lady Fuca, Primary Princess Consort Hegong, lady Ujaku. Lady Zu was initially reluctant to marry him so the proper marriage was finally held in 1732, five years after the selection.

Yunxi was succeeded by his adoptive grandson Yongrong as his sons died childless. After the adoption of Yongrong, the peerage was renamed to Prince Zhi of the Second Rank (质郡王) and later promoted to the first rank.

Primary Consort

- Imperial Princess Consort Shenjing, of the Zugiya clan (慎靖郡王妃 祖佳氏)
  Titles: Princess Consort of the Fourth Rank (贝子夫人) → Princess Consort of the Third Rank (贝勒夫人) → Princess Consort Shen of the Second Rank (慎郡王妃) → Imperial Princess Consort Shenjing of the Second Rank (慎靖郡王妃)
  - Princess of the Fourth Rank (县主, 24 February 1733 – 19 February 1795), third daughter
    - Married Jaisang Dorji of the Khalkha Borjigin clan

Secondary Consort

- Secondary consort, of the Zhao clan (侧福晋 赵氏)
  - First daughter (14 May 1727 – 26 December 1731)
  - Hongxun (弘旬, 15 April 1731 – 7 September 1749), second son
  - Fourth daughter (21 October 1733 – 18 May 1741)
- Secondary consort, of the Wu clan (侧福晋 吴氏)
  - Hong'ang (弘昂, 21 March 1728 – 24 October 1742), first son
- Secondary consort, of the Guan clan (侧福晋 关氏)
  - Lady of the Second Rank, second daughter (县君, 23 August 1727 – 2 March 1794)
    - Married Gumu (古穆) of the Khorchin Borjigin clan
