= Imperial Noble Consort Huixian =

Chinese imperial consort

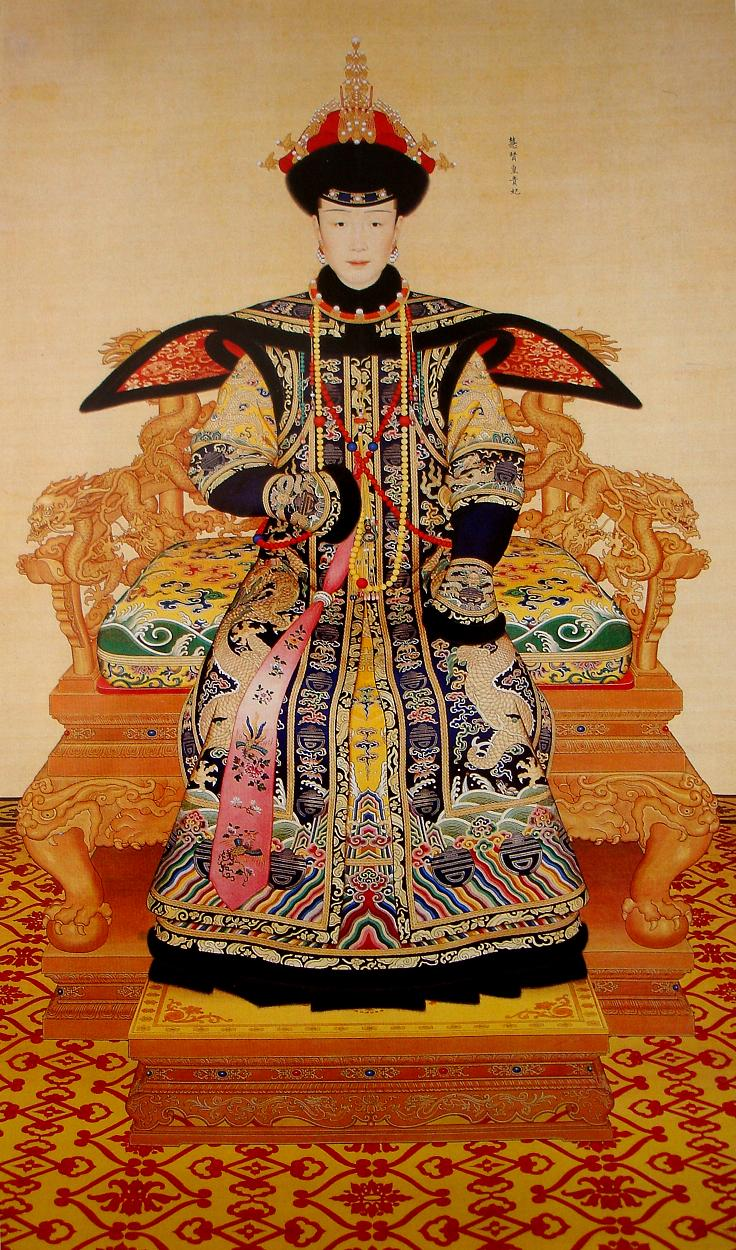
- Qing Dynasty portrait of Imperial Noble Consort Huixian
- Born: 1711 (康熙五十年)
- Died: 25 February 1745 (aged 33–34) (乾隆十年 正月 二十五日); Forbidden City, Beijing
- Burial: Yu Mausoleum, Eastern Qing tombs
- Spouse: Qianlong Emperor (before 1745)
Posthumous name
- Imperial Noble Consort Huixian (慧賢皇貴妃)
- House: Gao, later Gaogiya (高佳; by birth); Aisin-Gioro (by marriage)
- Father: Gao Bin
- Mother: Lady Magiya

Imperial Noble Consort Huixian
- Traditional Chinese: 慧賢皇貴妃
- Simplified Chinese: 慧贤皇贵妃
Transcriptions
Standard Mandarin
- Hanyu Pinyin: Huìxián Huángguìfēi

Imperial Noble Consort Huixian (1711 – 25 February 1745) of the Manchu Bordered Yellow Banner Gaogiya clan, was a consort of the Qianlong Emperor of the Qing dynasty.

== Life ==
=== Family background ===
Imperial Noble Consort Huixian's personal name was not recorded in history. She was a Han Chinese by birth and came from the Gao family, who were originally Han baoyi of the Imperial Household Department's Bordered Yellow Banner. It was Qing court protocol to put any non-Manchu consort and her close male relatives like brothers and cousins into a Manchu banner if they were a Han bannermen. Imperial Noble Consort Huixian and her brothers and cousins were put into the Manchu Yellow Bordered Banner effectively changing their ethnicity from Han to Manchu in the eyes of the Qing court. Their surname was Manchurized from Gao to Gaojia (高佳).

- Father: Gao Bin (高斌; 1683–1755), served as the Minister of Personnel from 1745–1747 and a Grand Secretary in the Wenyuan Library from 1747–1748. His first wife was Lady Chen, the daughter of Chen Alin, an Imperial Household Department staff captain belonging to Bordered Yellow Banner and a relative of Consort Chunyuqin (純裕勤太妃) hence the Chen family were also put into the Manchu Bordered Yellow Banner. His second wife was Lady Qi. His third wife was Lady Ma.
  - Paternal Grandfather: Gao Yanzhong 高衍中, served as an Imperial Household Department staff captain (zuoling) belonging to Bordered Yellow Banner.
  - Paternal Grandmother: Lady Li
  - Paternal Uncles: Gao Shuming 高述明 (a regional commander in Gansu) and Gao Yu 高鈺 (a regional commander in Jiangsu)
- Mother: Gao Bin's third wife. She was the daughter of Ma Weifan, an Imperial Household Department army officer belonging to Plain White Banner.
- One younger brother: Gao Heng (高恆), served as the Lianghuai Administrator of Salt Business, a Minister of the Imperial Household Department. He married an ethnic Manchu woman from the Nara clan of the Manchu Bordered Yellow Banner.
- Three younger sisters: Gao-jia-shi (Gaogiya), two of whom married respectively to an Eight Banners army commander E Shi of the Xilinjueluo (Sirin Gioro) family belonging to Bordered Blue Banner and an Imperial Household Department officer Han Jin belonging to Plain Yellow Banner.
- Cousin Gao Jin (高晉; father Gao Shuming), served as the Liangjiang Governor, Minister of Rites, and a Grand Secretary in the Wenhua Library. Gao Jin married Lady Wang of the Manchu Plain Blue Banner.
- Two cousin sisters: Gao-jia-shi (Gaogiya; father Gao Shuming), married respectively to Hu Zhao, an imperial senior bodyguard (shiwei) belonging to Plain Blue Banner (probably changed from the Imperial Household Department's Bordered Yellow Banner), and Li Weiping, an Imperial Household Department staff captain (zuoling) belonging to the Imperial Household Department's Plain White Banner.

=== Yongzheng era ===
Lady Gao was considered to be "a beautiful and well-educated woman with a great personality and many capabilities". It is not known when she become a lady-in-waiting, and then a concubine, of Aisin-Gioro Hongli, the Yongzheng Emperor's fourth son. On 4 April 1734, she was elevated to the rank of secondary consort. She was greatly favored by her husband all her life and developed a wonderful relationship with his principal wife, Lady Fuca.

=== Qianlong era ===
The Yongzheng Emperor died on 8 October 1735 and was succeeded by Hongli, who was enthroned as the Qianlong Emperor. Around this time, Gao Bin wrote a memorial to the Yongzheng Emperor, thanking him for a bunch of lychees, but it was too late as the emperor had already died when the memorial reached the palace, so the Qianlong Emperor replied in place of his father:

My father recognised your talent and promoted you to a high position. You should do your utmost to repay his grace. Even though your daughter is waiting on me, you should not be harbouring any ill intentions. This will not be tolerated by national law. If you serve the nation well with sincerity and integrity, I will not refrain from giving rewards to avoid being criticised for showing favouritism.

Lady Gao directly assisted Empress Fuca in managing the palace at large and caring for Empress Dowager Chongqing. On 23 January 1738, Lady Gao was granted the title of "Noble Consort". As she was the only woman in the imperial harem holding said rank at the time, she did not receive any special title to distinguish her from the emperor's other consorts.

On 23 February 1745, when Noble Consort Gao became critically ill, she was elevated to "Imperial Noble Consort Gao" by the Qianlong Emperor. However, she never managed to attend the promotion ceremony because she died 2 days after the emperor announced his decision. In 1752, she was interred in the Yu Mausoleum of the Eastern Qing tombs.

== Titles ==
- During the reign of the Kangxi Emperor (r. 1661–1722):
  - Lady Gao (高氏; from 1711)
- During the reign of the Yongzheng Emperor (r. 1722–1735):
  - Mistress (格格; date unknown)
  - Secondary Consort (側福晉; from 4 April 1734)
- During the reign of the Qianlong Emperor (r. 1735–1796):
  - Noble Consort (貴妃; from 23 January 1738), third rank consort
  - Imperial Noble Consort (皇貴妃; from 23 February 1745), second rank consort
  - Imperial Noble Consort Huixian (慧賢皇貴妃; from 26 February 1745)

== In fiction and popular culture ==
- Portrayed by Fu Chong in Jiangshan Weizhong (2002)
- Portrayed by Tan Zhuo in Story of Yanxi Palace (2018)
- Portrayed by Tong Yao in Ruyi's Royal Love in the Palace (2018)

== See also ==
- Ranks of imperial consorts in China § Qing
- Royal and noble ranks of the Qing dynasty
