= Necin (Qing dynasty) =

First Class Duke Necin

Chief Grand Councillor
- In office 14 May 1745 – 19 November 1748
- Preceded by: Ortai
- Succeeded by: Fuheng

Grand Councillor
- In office 28 December 1733 – 19 November 1748

Grand Secretary of the Baohe Hall
- In office 15 June 1745 – 19 November 1748

Assistant Grand Secretary
- In office 2 May 1739 – 14 May 1745

Deliberative Minister
- In office 10 February 1737 – 10 November 1738

Minister of Personnel
- In office 10 January 1739 – 16 June 1745
- Preceded by: Xinggui
- Succeeded by: Gao Bin

Minister of War
- In office 10 February 1737 – 10 November 1738
- Preceded by: Nasutu
- Succeeded by: Ošan

Personal details
- Born: Necin; 1708
- Died: 19 January 1749 (aged 40–41)
- Relations: Ebilun (grandfather), Alingga (uncle), Empress Xiaozhaoren (aunt), Noble Consort Wenxi (aunt), Ts'ereng (elder brother), Arigūn (younger brother)
- Parent: Yende (father)
- Occupation: politician
- Clan name: Niohuru

Military service
- Allegiance: Qing dynasty
- Branch/service: Manchu Plain Yellow Banner
- Battles/wars: First Jinchuan campaign

Necin (Manchu: ᠨᡝᠴᡳᠨ, Chinese: 訥親, 1708 – 19 January 1749), born in Niohuru clan, was a Qing dynasty official from the Manchu Plain Yellow Banner.

== Life ==
Necin was the second son of Yende. In 1727, he inherited the hereditary dukedom and appointed as the Junior Assistant Chamberlain of the Imperial Guard (Chinese: 散秩大臣, Manchu: sula amban). He was favored by Yongzheng Emperor, and appointed the Grand Councillor in 1728. He had served as lieutenant-general of the Manchu Bordered White Banner (鑲白旗滿洲都統), commander of the imperial bodyguard (領侍衛內大臣), lieutenant-general of the Manchu Bordered Yellow Banner (鑲黃旗滿洲都統), Minister of War (兵部尚書), Minister of Personnel (吏部尚書) and other positions. He was one of the officials whom Qianlong Emperor relied on, described as a "hard-working, cautious, capable and honest" official.

In 1748, during the First Jinchuan campaign, Necin was made the Military Commissioner (經略大臣) and sent to Sichuan to put down the rebellion. It was soon deprived of his post because of his failure to advance. He and Zhang Guangsi, whom was the Viceroy of Chuan-Shaan, quarreled over military strategy, mutually blamed each other. In the next year, Zhang was escorted to Beijing and later executed. Meanwhile, Necin was also condemned to death for cowardly conduct, for abusing his trust, and for making dishonest reports to the emperor. He was beheaded in full view of the army, making use of Ebilun's sword. His dukedom was given to his elder brother, Tsereng.
