= Yun'e =

Qing Dynasty prince (1683-1741)

- Fuguo Gong
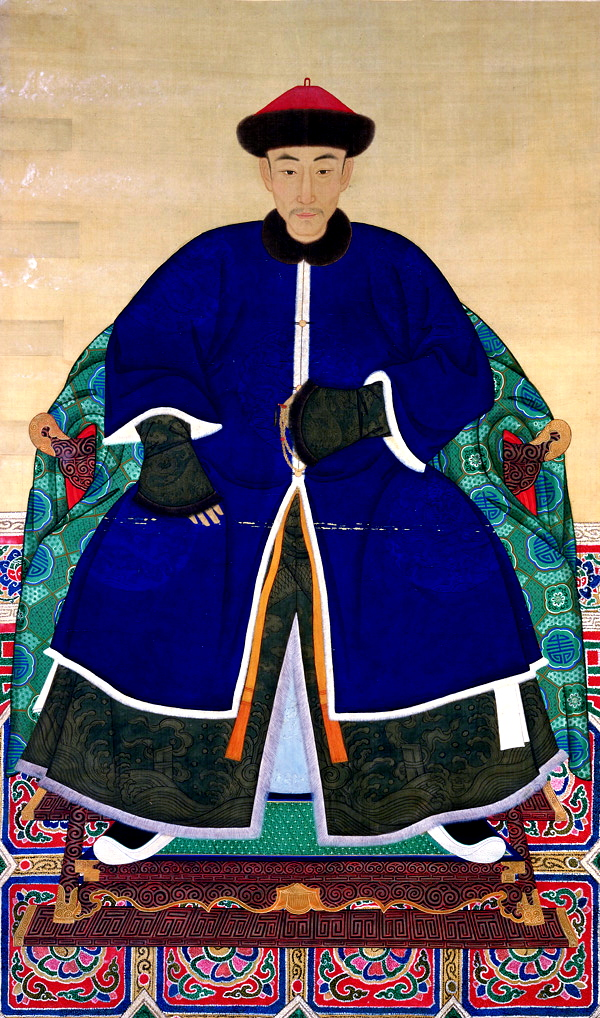

Prince Dun of the Second Rank
- Tenure: 24 April 1709 – 18 May 1724
- Born: Aisin Gioro Yin'e (愛新覺羅·胤䄉); 28 November 1683
- Died: 18 October 1741 (aged 57)
- Consorts: Lady Borjigit (博爾濟吉特氏); Lady Hešeri (赫舍里氏)
- Issue: Hongxu (弘旭); Hongxuan (弘暄); Hongjun (弘晙)
Names
- Aisin Gioro Yun'e (愛新覺羅·允䄉)
- House: Aisin Gioro
- Father: Kangxi Emperor
- Mother: Noble Consort Wenxi

Yun'e
- Chinese: 允䄉
Transcriptions
Standard Mandarin
- Hanyu Pinyin: Yǔn'é

Yin'e
- Chinese: 胤䄉
Transcriptions
Standard Mandarin
- Hanyu Pinyin: Yìn'é

Yun'e (28 November 1683 – 18 October 1741), born Yin'e, was an imperial prince of the Qing dynasty of China. He was a son of the Kangxi Emperor and a younger brother of the Yongzheng Emperor. He was a relatively unremarkable prince who was primarily known to be a crony of his older brother Yunsi.

== Life ==
Born in the Aisin Gioro clan, Yin'e was the tenth son of the Kangxi Emperor. His mother was Noble Consort Wenxi (溫僖貴妃) from the Niohuru clan. Apart from the Crown Prince Yinreng, Yin'e had the most prestigious maternal family background among the Kangxi Emperor's sons. His maternal grandfather, Ebilun, served as one of the Four Regents to the Kangxi Emperor when the emperor was still underage. Besides, Yin'e's maternal aunt, Empress Xiaozhaoren, was the second empress consort of the Kangxi Emperor. Despite his background, Yin'e was not one of the most outstanding among the Kangxi Emperor's sons.

In 1709, Yin'e was made a junwang (second-rank prince) under the title "Prince Dun of the Second Rank" (多羅敦郡王).

In 1722, the Kangxi Emperor died and was succeeded by his fourth son, Yinzhen, who became historically known as the Yongzheng Emperor. To avoid the naming taboo, the emperor's brothers had to change the character Yin (胤) in their names to Yun (允). Yin'e was thus renamed "Yun'e". In 1724, the Yongzheng Emperor accused Yun'e of siding with his eighth brother, Yunsi, who was one of the emperor's rivals in the power struggle over the succession to their father's throne. Yun'e was stripped of his princely title and placed under house arrest.

Yun'e was released after the Qianlong Emperor came to the throne in 1735. The emperor rehabilitated Yun'e and restored him as a fuguo gong. Yun'e died of illness in 1741 and was given a funeral befitting a beizi.

== Former residence ==
Yun'e's former residence, known as the "Prince Dun Mansion" (敦郡王府) or "Tenth Prince Mansion" (十王府), is located near the west entrance of Nanguanfang Hutong in the Shichahai area of Xicheng District, Beijing. It is located immediately due east of the Prince Gong Mansion. It is not clear if the buildings from the era still exist. It seems that the vicinity consists of commercial properties and a noodle shop.

== Family ==
Primary Consort

- Duchess of the Second Rank, of the Abaga Borjigit clan (奉恩国公夫人 博爾濟吉特氏)
  Titles: Primary Consort to the Eighteenth Prince (十八皇子嫡福晋), Primary Consort to Prince Dun of the Second Rank (多郡王福晋), Princess Consort Dun of the Second Rank (多郡王妃), Madame of the Duke of the Second Rank (奉恩国公夫人)
  - Hongxuan (弘暄; 18 June 1708 – 11 February 1735), 5th son
- Step Duchess of the Second Rank, of the Hešeri clan (奉恩国公夫人 赫舍里氏)
  Titles: Step Primary Consort to Prince Dun of the Second Rank (多郡王继福晋), Step Madame of the Second Rank (奉恩国公夫人)

Concubine

- Mistress, of the Gorolo clan (郭絡羅氏)
  - First son (12 September 1701 – 18 September 1701)
  - Hongxu (弘旭; 6 January 1703 – 25 February 1708), second son
  - Third son (1 February 1704 – 29 July 1709)
  - First daughter (20 September 1706 – 1 August 1743)
    - Married Lalida (拉里達) of the Khorchin Borjigit clan in November/December 1734
  - Hongjun (弘晙; 11 January 1711 – 29 September 1771), 6th son
- Mistress, of the Wang clan (王氏)
  - Fourth son (17 November 1706 – 23 November 1706)
  - Second daughter (11 June 1707 – 24 April 1727)
  - Third daughter (12 January 1712 – June/July 1719)

== In fiction and popular culture ==
- Portrayed by Liu Ke in Yongzheng Dynasty (1999)
- Portrayed by Liu Bin in Palace (2011)
- Portrayed by Ye Zuxin in Scarlet Heart (2011)
- Portrayed by Tian Xiping in Empresses in the Palace (2011)
- Portrayed by Matthew Ko in Gilded Chopsticks (2014)

== See also ==
- Royal and noble ranks of the Qing dynasty
