= Empress Niohuru =

Empress Niohuru may refer to:

- Empress Xiaozhaoren (1659–1678), wife of the Kangxi Emperor
- Empress Xiaoshengxian (1692–1777), concubine of the Yongzheng Emperor who became an empress dowager
- Empress Xiaoherui (1776–1850), wife of the Jiaqing Emperor
- Empress Xiaoquancheng (1808–1840), wife of the Daoguang Emperor
- Empress Dowager Ci'an (1837–1881), wife of the Xianfeng Emperor

== See also ==
- Empress Xiaomucheng (1781–1808), wife of the Daoguang Emperor before he took the throne
