= Concubine Cheng (Qianlong) =

Concubine of the Qianlong Emperor

Imperial Concubine Cheng
- Died: 29 May 1784
- Burial: Yu Mausoleum, Eastern Qing tombs
- Spouse: Qianlong Emperor (m. 1757–1784)
- House: Niohuru (鈕祜祿; by birth); Aisin Gioro (by marriage)
- Father: Mukedeng

Concubine Cheng
- Traditional Chinese: 誠嬪
- Simplified Chinese: 诚嫔
Transcriptions
Standard Mandarin
- Hanyu Pinyin: Chéng Pín

Imperial Concubine Cheng (died 29 May 1784), of the Manchu Plain Red Banner Niohuru clan, was a consort of Qianlong Emperor.

== Life ==
=== Family background ===
Imperial Concubine Cheng was a member of Manchu Plain Red Banner Niohuru clan.

- Father: Mukedeng (穆克登), a second class imperial guard and a commander of Niru (Chinese: 左领; pinyin: Zuǒ lǐng)
  - Paternal grandfather: A'ersong'a (阿尔松阿), Alingga's son and Ebilun's grandson, held a title of second-class duke (二等公)

=== Qianlong era ===
Lady Niohuru entered the Forbidden City as "Noble Lady Lan" (兰贵人; "lan" meaning "orchid") in 1757. Her residence in the Forbidden City was Yongshou palace. She lived under the supervision of Consort Shu. In 1759, Lady Niohuru punished a eunuch who stole her clothes and sold them; a common practice in the Imperial Palace. The servant was exiled to Ningguta. After the incident, she was demoted to "First Class Female Attendant Lan" (兰常在). In 1768, she was restored as "Noble Lady Lan". In 1777, Lady Niohuru was promoted to "Imperial Concubine Cheng" (诚嫔; "cheng" meaning "sincere"), but the ceremony was delayed until 1779 because of the mourning period after Empress Xiaoshengxian. She began to live together with Noble Lady Shun. Imperial Concubine Cheng died on 29 May 1784 during Qianlong Emperor's southern tour. She was interred in Yu mausoleum in the Eastern Qing tombs.

== Titles ==
- During the reign of the Qianlong Emperor (r. 1735–1796):
  - Lady Niohuru (from unknown date)
  - Noble Lady Lan (兰贵人; from 1757), sixth rank consort
  - First Class Female Attendant Lan (兰常在; from 1758), seventh rank consort
  - Noble Lady Lan (兰贵人; from 1768), sixth rank consort
  - Imperial Concubine Cheng (诚嫔; from 1777), fifth rank consort

== See also ==
- Ranks of imperial consorts in China § Qing
- Royal and noble ranks of the Qing dynasty
