= Succession War (TV series) =

Hong Kong historical drama

- Also known as: Mandate of Heaven; Heaven's Will
- 天命
- Genre: Historical drama
- Created by: Chong Wai-kin
- Written by: Yip Tin-shing; Lam Lai-mei
- Starring: Ruco Chan; Shaun Tam; Selena Lee; Natalie Tong; Elaine Yiu; Joel Chan; Jonathan Cheung; Matthew Ho
- Ending theme: "Regrets of Separation" (悔別離) by Ruco Chan
- Country of origin: Hong Kong
- Original languages: Cantonese; Mandarin
- No. of episodes: 28

Production
- Executive producer: Chong Wai-kin
- Production locations: Hong Kong; Beijing, China; Hengdian World Studios
- Running time: 45 minutes
- Production company: TVB

Original release
- Network: TVB Jade
- Release: 25 June – 29 July 2018

Related
- Flying Tiger; The Stunt

Succession War
- Chinese: 天命
- Literal meaning: "heaven's mandate"
Transcriptions
Standard Mandarin
- Hanyu Pinyin: Tiānmìng
Yue: Cantonese
- Jyutping: Tin1 Ming6

Succession War (Chinese: 天命; Jyutping: Tin1 Ming6) is a Hong Kong historical drama created and produced by Chong Wai-kin for TVB, starring Ruco Chan, Shaun Tam, Selena Lee, Natalie Tong and Elaine Yiu as the main leads. The show is a fictional biography story about the last 28 days of the life of Qing dynasty court official Heshen, who is known for being the most corrupt court official in Chinese history. Succession War premiered on 25 June 2018 on TVB Jade.

== Premise ==
Succession War stars Ruco Chan as Heshen of the Niohuru clan, a Qing dynasty official who came into power under the reign of the Qianlong Emperor. The drama depicts the last 28 days of his life, with each episode covering the course of one day. Succession War details the events and characters of the time that ultimately lead to Heshen's death.

== Cast and characters ==
Some names are romanized based on historical ethnic romanizations, while others may be romanized in either Mandarin or Cantonese romanization.

=== Qing Imperial Family ===
- Lily Leung as Lady Niohuru, the Empress Dowager Chongqing (崇慶皇太后), Qianlong's late mother and Jiaqing's late grandmother
- KK Cheung (張國強) as Qianlong (乾隆帝), the Retired Emperor (太上皇), Jiaqing's father who favors Heshen
  - Episode 4: Succumbs to poisoning by Jiaqing
- Angelina Lo as Lady Barin, the Dowager Noble Consort Ying (穎貴太妃), Qianlong's consort
- Shaun Tam (譚俊彥) as Jiaqing Emperor (嘉慶帝), Qianlong's fifteenth son and successor who is intimidated by Heshen's power
- Jess Sum as Hitara Shuk-yung (喜塔臘·淑容), the Empress Xiaoshurui (孝淑睿皇后), Jiaqing's late empress
- Selena Lee as Niohuru Ling-yee (鈕祜祿·鈴兒), the Empress Xiaoherui (孝和睿皇后), Jiaqing's empress, first introduced as his Imperial Noble Consort (皇貴妃)
- Yoyo Chen as Liugiya Ching-yee (劉佳．晴兒), the Noble Consort Xian (諴妃), Jiaqing's consort
- Siu Hoi Yan as Lady Hougiya, the Consort Hua (華妃), Jiaqing's consort
- Katherine Ho as Lady Niohuru, the Concubine Ru (如嬪), Jiaqing's concubine
- Kathy Fung as Concubine Hui (惠嬪), Jiaqing's concubine
- Aliya Fan as Jiaqing's concubine
- Hebe Chan as Jiaqing's concubine
- Wingto Lam as Jiaqing's concubine
- Yu Chi Ming as Hongxiao, Prince Yi of the First Rank (怡親王弘曉), Qianlong's cousin
- Savio Tsang as Yongxuan, Prince Yi of the First Rank (儀親王永璇), Qianlong's eighth son, leaves the ranks in episode 27 over distraught and depression
- David Do as Yongxing, Prince Cheng of the First Rank (成親王永瑆), Qianlong's eleventh son
- Jonathan Cheung as Yonglin, the Seventeenth Imperial Prince (十七貝勒永璘), Qianlong's seventeenth son and Jiaqing's younger brother
- Stephanie Ho as Gurun Princess Hexiao (固倫和孝公主), personal name: Sheung-sheung (雙雙), Qianlong's tenth daughter and the wife of Fengshen Yinde
- Nono Yeung as Mianning (綿寧), Jiaqing's son

=== Niohuru Household ===
- Ruco Chan as Niohuru Heshen (鈕祜祿·和珅), the most powerful and corrupt official in the Qing Court
- Natalie Tong as Tau Kau (豆蔻), Heshen's lover and trusted aide, whom he has proposed to many times
- Kimmy Kwan as Fung Tzs-man (馮霽雯), Heshen's late wife
- Elaine Yiu as Cheung Mei (長媚), Heshen's second wife, who was educated in Europe
- Michelle Wong as Ng Hing-lin (吳卿憐), Heshen's concubine
- Lena Wong as Nalan (納蘭), Heshen's concubine
- Eddie Pang as Niohuru Helin (鈕祜祿·和琳), Heshen's younger brother and a general
  - Episode 14: Commits suicide
- Matthew Ho as Niohuru Fengshen Yinde (鈕祜祿·豐紳殷德), the Prince Consort (固倫額駙), Heshen's eldest son and the husband of Gurun Princess Hexiao
- Stephanie Ho as Gurun Princess Hexiao (固倫和孝公主), Qianlong's daughter and the wife of Fengshen Yinde
- Lau Chong Hei as Niohuru Fu'en (鈕祜祿·福恩), Heshen's grandson and the son of Fengshen Yinde and Gurun Princess Hexiao
- Henry Lo as Lau Chuen (劉全), Heshen's steward and most loyal to Heshen. He is killed by an army raid after Tau Kau betrays him by talking to Janggiya Nayancheng in Episode 27.
- Leo Kwan as Yuen Po (元寶), Heshen's servant
- Apple Chan as Mau Tan (牡丹), Cheung Mei's personal maid

=== Qing Court ===
- Ruco Chan as Niohuru Heshen (鈕祜祿·和珅); Grand Secretary, Senior Grand Councillor, Nine Gates Infantry Commander (九門提督), & Grand Minister Supervisor of the Imperial Household Department (內務府總管)
  - Episode 5: Dismissed from duties as the Nine Gates Infantry Commander & Grand Minister Supervisor of the Imperial Household Department
- Lee Shing-cheong as Lau Yung (劉墉), Grand Secretary
- Henry Yu as Kei Hiu-lam (紀曉嵐), Grand Councillor and Minister of Rites (禮部上書)
- Law Lok Lam as Chu Kwai (朱珪), Grand Councillor and Minister of Personnel (吏部尚書
- To Yin-gor as Janggiya Agui (章佳·阿桂), Grand Councillor
  - Episode 1: Commits suicide after failing to assassinate Heshen (through a sword duel) and Qianlong (through a burning cloak)
- Kwan Wai Lun as Tatara Suringga (他塔拉·蘇凌阿), Minister of Justice (刑部尚書)
  - Episode 14: Sentenced to death for hiding Helin
- Eddie Li as Pang Yuen-shui (彭元瑞), Minister of Works (工部尚書)
- Kong Fu Keung as Kam Shi-chung (金士松), Minister of War (兵部尚書)
- Lee Hoi Sang as Shum Chor (沈初), Minister of Revenue (戶部尚書)
  - Episode 13: Assassinated by Tau Kau and Lam Kan
- Leo Tsang as Lee Si-yiu (李侍堯), Viceroy of Minzhe (閩浙總督)
- Joel Chan as Fuca Fuchang'an (富察·福長安), Viceroy of Grain Transport (漕運總督)
- Benny Tsang as Ng Sang-lan (吳省蘭), Senior Deputy Minister of Rites (禮部左侍郎)
- Terrence Huang as Lee Wong (李潢), Senior Deputy Minister of War (兵部左侍郎)
- Joe Tang as Chan Tsang-hei (陳曾希), Senior Deputy Minister of Justice (刑部左侍郎)
  - Episode 7: Executed on charges of corruption
- Kings Wong as Murca Chengshu (穆爾查·成書), Junior Deputy Minister of Revenue (戶部右侍郎)
- Ray Lo as Lee Kwong-wan (李光雲), Minister of the Court of the Imperial Stud (太僕寺卿)
- Tony Chui as Tai Kui-hang (戴衢亨)
- William Chan as Hada Nara Yulin (哈達納喇·玉麟), Chief Supervisor of Instruction (詹事)
- George Ng as Siu Yat-hong (蕭一航), Deputy Director-General of the Intelligence Bureau
- Kenneth Fok as Fuca Fuk'anggan (富察·福康安), a general and Fuchang'an's late older brother
- Matthew Ho as Niohuru Fengshen Yinde (鈕祜祿·豐紳殷德), Director-General of the Intelligence Bureau (密寄署總裁) & Grand Minister Supervisor of the Imperial Household Department (內務府總管)
- Andrew Yuen as Borjigit Lavan Dorji (博爾濟吉特·拉旺多爾濟), the Prince Jasagh of the First Rank (札薩克親王), a prince of the Khalkha Mongols
- Eddie Pang as Niohuru Helin (鈕祜祿·和琳), General of Shandong
- Kelvin Yuen as Pok Tok-ngok (博托鄂), Deputy General and Fuchang'an's subordinate
- Frankie Choi as Lau Wan-chi (劉鐶之), Prefect of Shuntian (順天府尹); and Lau Yung's adopted son and nephew
  - Episode 7: Executed on charges of corruption
- Ricky Wong as Fuca Mingliang (富察·明亮), Deputy General of Shandong and Helin's subordinate; cousin of Fuchang'an
- Willie Lau as Kei Chun (耆津), Regimental Commander of the Vanguard Battalion (前鋒營參領)

=== Imperial Servants ===
- Chan Wing Chun as Cho Tsun-hei (曹進喜), Head Eunuch and Qianlong's personal eunuch
- Sunny Dai as Little Eunuch Tak (小德子), Jiaqing's personal eunuch
- Samantha Chuk as Granny Fong (方嬤嬤), Dowager Noble Consort Ying's personal maid
- GoGo Cheung as Suet Ying (雪瑩), Noble Consort Xian's personal maid
- Clevis Tam as Sheung Chun (常春), a eunuch who is murdered by Jiaqing after becoming accidentally poisoned in Jiaqing's scheme to kill Qianlong
- Jonathan Lee as Sheung Tung (常冬), a eunuch who is forced by Jiaqing to frame Yongxuan for poisoning the late Retired Emperor. He commits suicide by poison when Heshen captures him and attempts to make him be reframed.

=== White Lotus Sect ===
- Wong Wai Tong as Chai Lam (齊林), Sect Leader
  - Episode 5: Commits suicide
- Candice Chiu as Wong Chung-yi (王聰兒), wife of Chai Lam and later Sect Leader
- Oscar Li as Yiu Tsz-fu (姚之富), Branch Commander
- Lena Li as Yip Ching-ching (葉青青), a sect disciple
- Jack Wu as Janggiya Nayancheng (章佳·那彥成), Agui's grandson who infiltrates the White Lotus Sect on orders from Jiaqing

=== Others ===
- Pinky Cheung as Tip Yee (蝶依), a Tibetan woman and Heshen's informant
- Alan Tam as Lam Kan (林根), Tau Kau's friend and assistant
- Osanna Chiu as Wo Wo Tau (窩窩頭), Tau Kau's maid
- Chan Min Leung as Chui King-wan (徐景雲), the Head Imperial Physician
- Dolby Kwan as Sha Wai-yat (沙惟一), an Imperial Physician
- Andy Sui as Chin King (錢景), an Imperial Physician
- Mok Wai Man as Nyima Tseten (尼瑪次旦), a highly skilled Tibetan physician
- Forest Chan as Yuen Tsan (玄珍), a blind fortune teller

== Awards and nominations ==
=== TVB Anniversary Gala ===
Favourite TVB Actress (Singapore)
Nominees	Category	Result
Selena Li	Favourite TVB Actress (Singapore)	Nominated
Elaine Yiu	Favourite TVB Actress (Singapore)	Nominated

Favourite TVB Actor (Singapore)
Nominees	Category	Result
Ruco Chan	Favourite TVB Actor (Singapore)	Top 3
Shaun Tam	Favourite TVB Actor (Singapore)	Nominated
Joel Chan	Favourite TVB Actor (Singapore)	Nominated

Favourite TVB Actress (Malaysia)
Nominees	Category	Result
Selena Li	Favourite TVB Actress (Malaysia)	Nominated
Elaine Yiu	Favourite TVB Actress (Malaysia)	Nominated

Favourite TVB Actor (Singapore)
Nominees	Category	Result
Ruco Chan	Favourite TVB Actor (Malaysia)	Top 3
Shaun Tam	Favourite TVB Actor (Singapore)	Nominated
Joel Chan	Favourite TVB Actor (Malaysia)	Nominated
