= Empress Xiaozhao =

Empress Xiaozhao may refer to:

- Grand Empress Dowager Shangguan (89BC – 37BC), wife of Emperor Zhao of Han
- Empress Xiaozhaoren (1653–1678), wife of the Kangxi Emperor during the Qing dynasty
