= Chia Ching =

Chia Ching or Jiajing or Jiaqing may refer to the following Chinese emperors:

- Jiajing Emperor of the Ming dynasty
- Jiaqing Emperor of the Qing dynasty
