= Xiang Jianzhang =

- 項繭章
- Occupation: Poet, painter
- Spouse(s): Hsu Nai-pu
- Parent(s): Xiang Fudi

Xiang Jianzhang (Chinese: 項絸章; fl. early 19th century), also known by the personal name Xun, the courtesy name Pingshan (屏山) and the art name Jianqing (繭卿), was a Qing Dynasty painter and poet.

Xiang Jianzhang, a native of Qiantang (present-day Hangzhou), was the daughter of Xiang Fudi. She became the second wife of Xu Naipu, an imperial official who served as Minister of War. He was also an accomplished painter and calligrapher.

She published a collection of poetry, Collected Works from the Brush-and-Ink Harmony Hall (Hanmo heming guan ji 翰墨和鳴館集), which is no longer extant. Two of her poems were included in poet and painter Li Junzhi's anthology History of Poetry by Qing Dynasty Painters (Qing huajia shishi 清畫家詩史). In one of them she expresses a preference for the "boneless" technique of painting without outlines.

Shi Shuyi recounts an anecdote about when the Jiaqing Emperor gave Xu Naipu four pieces of tributary paper and instructed him to have flowers and birds painted on them. Xiang Jianzhang painted orchids and bamboo on three of them but the fourth piece of paper was stained thanks to a household guest. Xu Naipu feared reproachment from the emperor, but Xiang Jianzhang concealed the stain by painting a rock and some stalks of withered bamboo.
