= Manggong cake =

Chinese dessert

Manggong cake (simplified Chinese: 盲公饼; traditional Chinese: 盲公餅; pinyin: mánggōngbǐng; Jyutping: maang4 gung1 beng2) is a well-known speciality in Foshan City, Guangdong Province.

== History ==
The cake was initiated in the Jiaqing period of the Qing Dynasty by a blind old man named He who lived in Jiaoshan Fang, Heyuan Street, Foshan City, and established the "Qianqiantang" divination hall to tell people about their fortune.

One day, trying to be different, he baked a kind of cake with abraded rice crust, oil, sugar, peanut and sesame on charcoal fire, because of its high quality called this famous cake made by him, the blind man, "Manggong Cake" and Foshan Manggong Cake has therefore named after it. Because of its characteristics of golden colour and being sweet, appetizing and crisp, Manggong Cake, made by inherited method of production, has become a well-known local speciality in Foshan City.
