= Consort Hua =

Consort of Jiaqing Emperor

- Born: Hougiya Liuniu; Shenyang
- Died: 3 August 1804; Forbidden City
- Burial: Chang Mausoleum, Western Qing tombs
- Spouse: Jiaqing Emperor (before 1804)
- Issue: Sixth daughter
- House: Hougiya (by birth); Aisin Gioro (by marriage)
- Father: Taozhu

Consort Hua
- Traditional Chinese: 華妃
- Simplified Chinese: 华妃
Transcriptions
Standard Mandarin
- Hanyu Pinyin: Huá Fēi

Consort Hua (simplified Chinese: 华妃; traditional Chinese: 華妃; pinyin: Huá Fēi; died 3 August 1804), of the Han Chinese Hougiya clan belonging to the Bordered Yellow Banner, was a consort of Jiaqing Emperor.

== Life ==
=== Family background ===
Consort Hua was a booi of Han Chinese Hougiya clan belonging to the Bordered Yellow Banner. Her personal name was Liuniu (六妞). Her ancestral home was located in Shenyang.

Father: Taozhu, a Minister of Imperial Stables (Chinese: 上驷院; pinyin: Shangpiyuan)

- First paternal uncle: Changshu (常舒), served as third rank military official (参领)
- Paternal grandfather: Liuge (六格).

One elder sister: Wife of grace general Fuming'a (福明阿) from the Prince Keqin peerage.

=== Qianlong era ===
It is not known when Lady Hougiya entered the residence of Prince Jia of the First Rank as a servant (Chinese: 管女子; pinyin: Guǎn nǚzǐ) and was promoted to concubine (Chinese: 格格; pinyin: gege). On 2 August 1789, she gave birth to Jiaqing Emperor's 6th daughter who would die prematurely in 1790.

=== Jiaqing era ===
On 22 January 1796, Lady Hougiya was granted a title "Concubine Ying" (莹嫔, "ying" meaning "luster of gems") comparing her beauty to the reflection of gemstones. In January 1797, she attended court session conducted by Empress Xiaoshurui together with all consorts of the Jiaqing Emperor. In 1801, Concubine Ying was promoted to "Consort Hua" (华妃). That year, a secretary of Inner Court Jilun wrote two poems about the promotion of Consort Hua. According to "Swangoose sees through needs"(Chinese: 鸿称通用; pinyin: Hongchentongyong), "hua" means "elegant and beautiful", while "ying" means "sparkling like gemstones". Hougiya Liuniu died on 3 August 1804. Her coffin was temporarily placed at the Antian Grieving Palace and later interred in Chang Mausoleum in Western Qing tombs.

== Titles ==
- During the reign of the Qianlong Emperor (r. 1735–1796):
  - Lady Hougiya (from unknown date)
  - Servant (管女子; from unknown date)
  - Mistress (格格; from unknown date)
- During the reign of the Jiaqing Emperor (r. 1796–1820):
  - Concubine Ying (莹嫔; from 22 January 1796), fifth rank consort
  - Consort Hua (华妃; from 1801), fourth rank consort

== Issue ==
- As mistress:
  - Sixth daughter (2 August 1789 – June/July 1790)

== In fiction and popular culture ==
- Portrayed by Siu Hoi Yan in Succession War (2018)

== See also ==
- Ranks of imperial consorts in China § Qing
- Royal and noble ranks of the Qing dynasty
