= British attempted occupation of Macau =

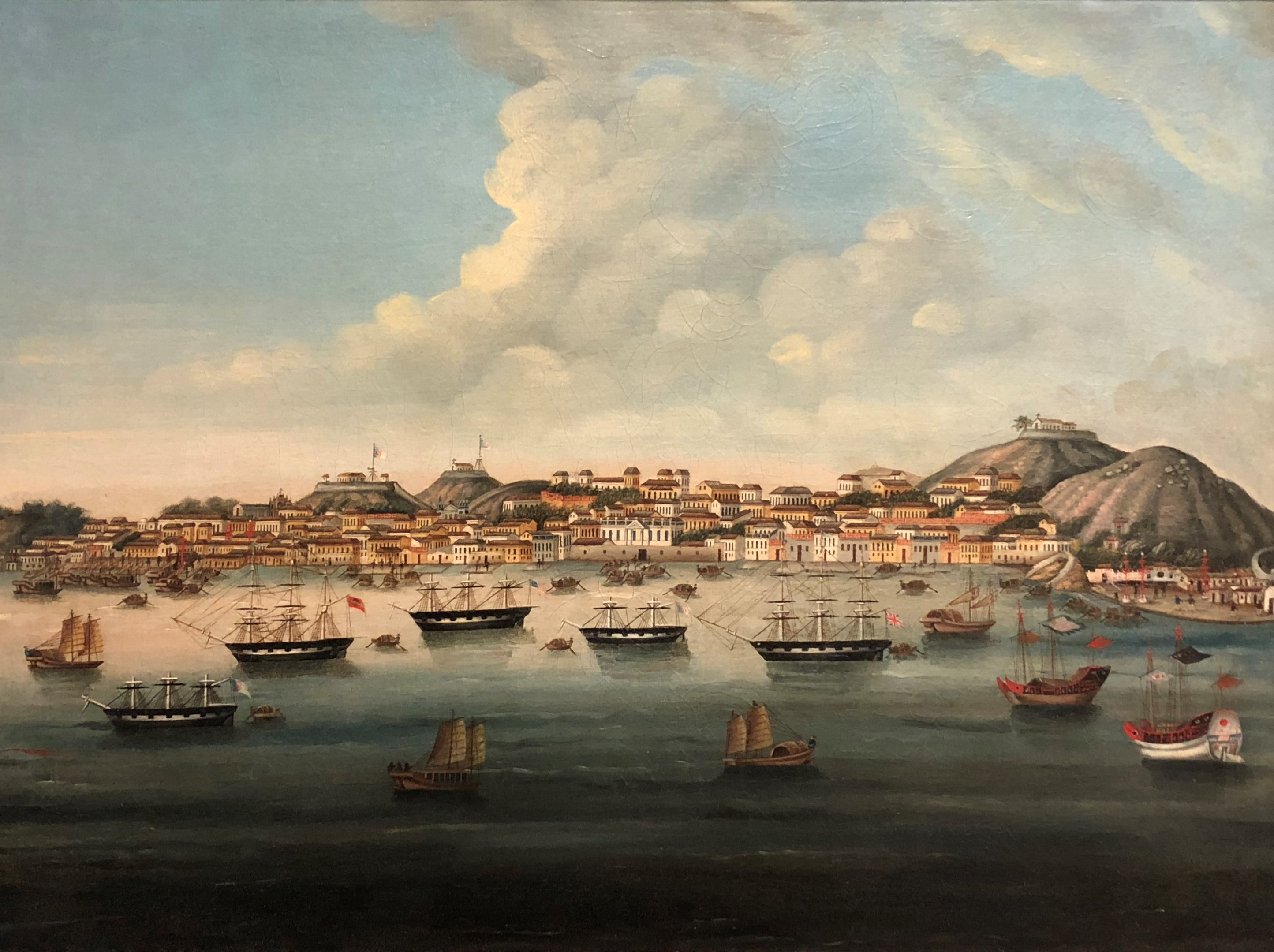
Macau in the early 19th century

The British attempted occupation of Macau (Portuguese: Tentativa inglesa de ocupar Macau) refers to the military operations carried out by the United Kingdom to occupy Macau in the early 19th century. Although Britain was a long-term ally of Portugal, conflicts existed between the two sides regarding colonization and trade. Consequently, when Portugal was entangled in the French Revolutionary Wars and the Napoleonic Wars, Britain twice attempted to occupy Macau under the pretext of "joint defense" in 1802 and 1808. In 1808, Britain successfully occupied Macau for a time, but was ultimately forced to withdraw its troops due to the intervention of the Jiaqing Emperor of the Qing dynasty.
