= Imperial Noble Consort Heyu =

- Born: 9 January 1761
- Died: 27 April 1834 (aged 73); Forbidden City, Beijing, Qing dynasty
- Burial: Chang Mausoleum, Western Qing tombs
- Spouse: Jiaqing Emperor (m. 1776; died 1820)
- Issue: Prince Mu of the Second Rank; Princess Zhuangjing of the Second Rank
Posthumous name
- Imperial Noble Consort Heyu (和裕皇貴妃)
- House: Liugiya (劉佳; by birth); Aisin Gioro (by marriage)
- Father: Liu Mingfu (劉明福)

Imperial Noble Consort Heyu
- Traditional Chinese: 和裕皇貴妃
- Simplified Chinese: 和裕皇贵妃
Transcriptions
Standard Mandarin
- Hanyu Pinyin: Héyù Huángguìfēi

Imperial Noble Consort Heyu (Chinese: 和裕皇貴妃; pinyin: Héyù Huángguìfēi; 9 January 1761 – 27 April 1834), of the Bordered White Banner Liu clan of Han ethnicity, was a consort of the Jiaqing Emperor of China's Qing dynasty.

== Life ==
=== Family background ===
Imperial Noble Consort Heyu's personal name wasn't recorded in history. She came from Han Chinese Bordered White Banner Liu clan, later manchurised to Liugiya (刘佳).

Father: Mingfu (明福), served as baitangga.

=== Qianlong era ===
Lady Liugiya was born on the 21st day of 12th lunar month of 26th year of the Qianlong era, which translates to 9 January 1761 in the Gregorian calendar. In 1776, she married Yongyan, Qianlong Emperor's fifteenth son and became his mistress (Chinese: 格格; pinyin: gege). On 4 February 1779, she gave birth to Yongyan's first son, Prince Mu of the Second Rank (穆郡王), who would die prematurely in 1780. On 30 January 1782, she gave birth to Princess Zhuangjing of the Second Rank (庄敬和硕公主), Yongyan's third daughter.

=== Jiaqing era ===
After the coronation of Jiaqing Emperor, Lady Liu was granted a title "Consort Xian"(咸妃; "xian" meaning "truthful"). On 24 December 1801, Consort Xian's daughter married Mongolian prince Sodnamdorji of the Khorchin Borjigit clan. In January 1808, Lady Liu was elevated to "Noble Consort Xian" (諴贵妃). Her residence in the Forbidden City was Palace of Earthly Honour.

=== Daoguang era ===
After the enthronement of Daoguang Emperor in 1820, Noble Consort Xian was promoted to "Dowager Imperial Noble Consort Xianxi" (𫍯禧皇贵太妃; "xianxi" meaning "truthful and happy"). Lady Liu died on 27 April 1834 at the age of 73. She was posthumously bestowed a title "Imperial Noble Consort Heyu" (和裕皇贵妃; "heyu" meaning "harmonious and prosperous"). The son of Princess Zhuangjing of the Second Rank, Sengge Rinchen (僧格林沁), was ordered to wear mourning garment for his maternal grandmother's funeral. In 1835, she was interred at the Chang Mausoleum in the Western Qing Tombs.

== Titles ==
- During the reign of the Qianlong Emperor (r. 1735–1796):
  - Lady Liugiya (from 9 January 1761)
  - Mistress (格格; from 1776)
- During the reign of the Jiaqing Emperor (r. 1796–1820):
  - Consort Xian (諴妃; from 1796), fourth rank consort
  - Noble Consort Xian (諴貴妃; from 1808), third rank consort
- During the reign of the Daoguang Emperor (r. 1820–1850):
  - Dowager Imperial Noble Consort Xianxi (諴禧皇貴太妃; from 1820), third rank consort
  - Imperial Noble Consort Heyu (和裕皇貴妃; from 1834)

== Issue ==
- As mistress:
  - Prince Mu of the Second Rank (穆郡王; 4 February 1780 – 10 June 1780)
  - Princess Zhuangjing of the Second Rank (莊敬和碩公主; 30 January 1782 – 4 April 1811)
    - Married Sodnamdorji (索特納木多布濟/索特纳木多尔济, pinyin: Suotenamudo'erji; d. 1825) of the Khorchin Borjigit clan on 24 December 1801

== In fiction and popular culture ==
- Portrayed by Yoyo Chen in Succession War (2018)

== See also ==
- Ranks of imperial consorts in China § Qing
- Royal and noble ranks of the Qing dynasty
