= Concubine Xun =

Chinese consort

Concubine Xun 遜嬪
- Born: Unknown; Qing dynasty
- Died: 31 December 1786; Forbidden City, Beijing, Qing dynasty
- Burial: Western Qing tombs
- Spouse: Jiaqing Emperor (before 1786)
- Issue: Princess Hui'an
- House: Shen (by birth); Aisin Gioro (by marriage)
- Father: Shen Yonghe

Concubine Xun (Chinese: 遜嬪, Pinyin: Xùn pín ) of the Manchu Plain Yellow Banner Shen clan (沈氏; d. 31 December 1786), was one of the Han Chinese wives of Jiaqing Emperor.

== Life ==
=== Family background ===
Concubine Xun was born into the Shen clan of the Manchu Plain Yellow Banner. Her ancestral home was located in Shenyang. Her personal name was not recorded.

- Father: Shen Yonghe (沈永和), Governor of Rehe (热河总管) and Minister of Imperial Household (总管内务)

=== Qianlong era ===
During the 47th year of Qianlong, Lady Shen was chosen to be Yongyan's mistress. She entered the Prince Jia's manor. On 31 December 1786, Mistress Shen gave birth to the fifth daughter of her husband, Princess Hu'an, who would die prematurely in 1795, at the age of 8. Lady Shen died soon after giving birth to her daughter. She was later posthumously awarded the title of Concubine Xun, meaning The Modest Concubine.

== Titles ==
- During the reign of the Qianlong Emperor (r. 1735–1796):
  - Lady Shen (遜氏, from unknown date)
  - Mistress (格格: from 1782)
- During the reign of the Jiaqing Emperor (r. 1796–1820):
  - Concubine Xun (遜嬪, from 22 April 1797)

== Issue ==
As a Mistress:

- Princess Hui'an of the Second Rank (慧安和碩公主; 31 December 1786 – June/July 1795), Jiaqinq's fifth daughter
