= Noble Lady Shun =

Consort of China's Qianlong Emperor from 1766 to 1788

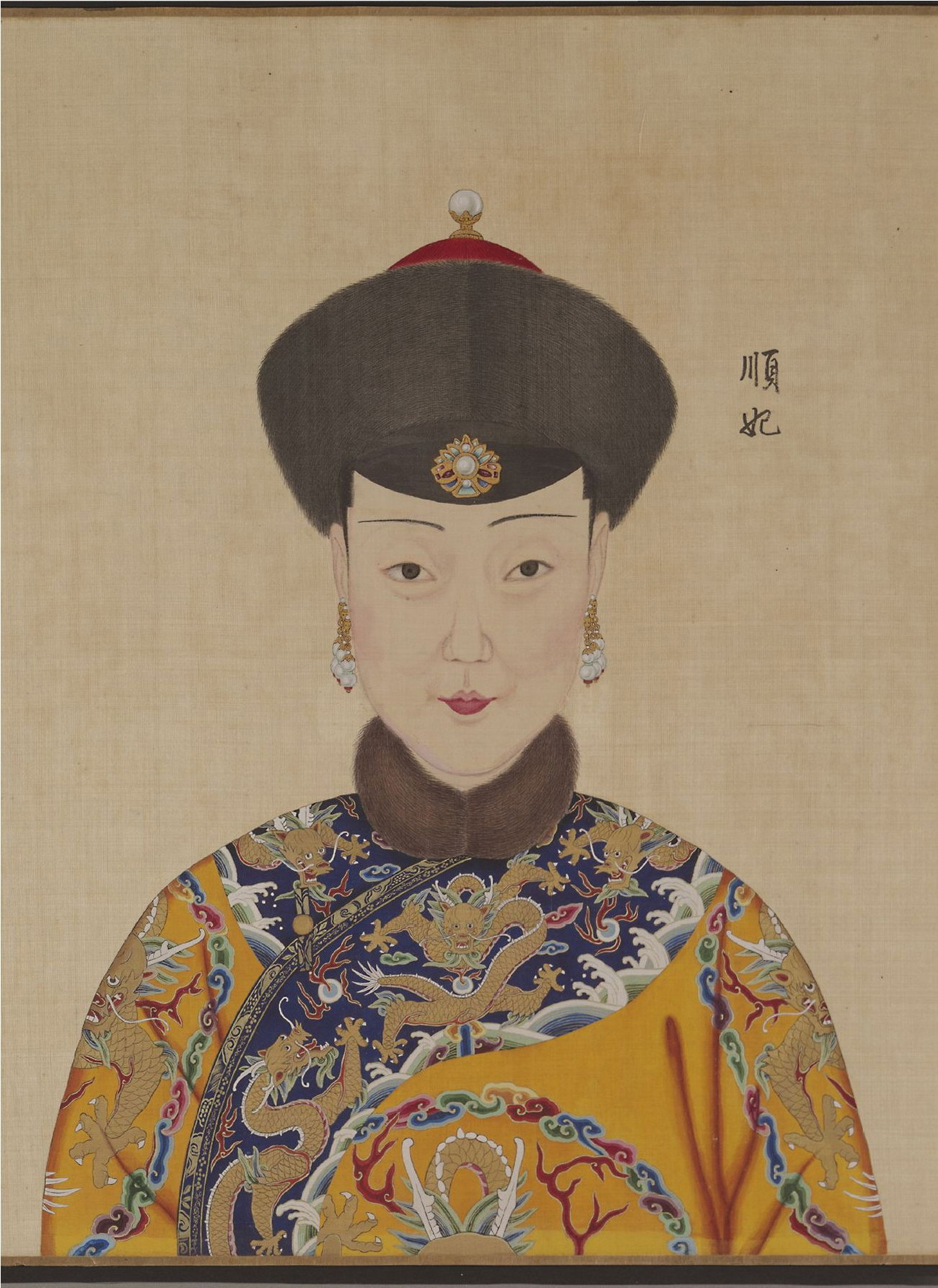
- Portrait of Noble Lady Shun
- Born: 3 January 1748
- Died: 9 September 1790 (aged 42)
- Spouse: Qianlong Emperor (m. 1766–1788)
- House: Niohuru (by birth); Aisin Gioro (by marriage)
- Father: Aibida

Noble Lady Shun
- Traditional Chinese: 順貴人
- Simplified Chinese: 顺贵人
Transcriptions
Standard Mandarin
- Hanyu Pinyin: Shùn Guìrén

Noble Lady Shun (3 January 1748 – 9 September 1790), of the Manchu Niohuru clan, was a consort of the Qianlong Emperor of the Qing dynasty.

== Life ==
=== Family background ===
Noble Lady Shun was born in the Manchu Niohuru clan. Her personal name is unknown. Her father was Aibida (愛必達), a governor (總督) and grandson of Ebilun. Her great-aunt was Empress Xiaozhaoren, the second empress of the Kangxi Emperor. Lady Niohuru's ancestry and family was filled with prestigious officials and respectable individuals.

=== Qianlong era ===
Lady Niohuru was born on 3 January 1748 during the reign of the Qianlong Emperor. She entered the Forbidden City in 1766 and was granted the rank of "Noble Lady Chang" (常貴人). Originally, Empress Dowager Chongqing suggested that she be selected as empress, as the previous empress had died that same year and the only one leading the imperial harem was Imperial Noble Consort Ling, a Han woman who could never legally marry the emperor. Qianlong rejected Lady Niohuru, stating that he would never promote anyone to the position of empress again, and continued to leave palace affairs to the Imperial Noble Consort.

In 1768 Lady Niohuru was promoted to "Imperial Concubine Shun" (順嬪). In 1771, the Emperor took a southern tour of the country, bringing only six consorts with him. Among them was Lady Niohuru. In 1776 she became pregnant, but suffered a miscarriage. That same year, the emperor elevated her to the status of "Consort Shun" (順妃), perhaps to comfort her. A similar occurrence happened to Consort Yu in 1759. The promotion ceremony was set to be held in the following year but was delayed by two years because of the death of the empress dowager in 1777.

In 1780 Consort Shun lead the Silkworm Worship Ceremony, which was usually held by the empress herself.

The Qianlong Emperor was said to have a great relationship with Consort Shun. There is a record that the emperor personally hunted two ducks and gave them to her as a gift. She was one of the twelve consorts out of Qianlong's fifty to be drawn in the painting "Portraits of the Qianlong Emperor and His Twelve Consorts" by Giuseppe Castiglione.

In 1788 Lady Niohuru was demoted to "Imperial Concubine Shun" (順嬪) for unknown reasons. 16 days later she was demoted to "Noble Lady Shun" (順貴人).

She died on 9 September 1790 at the age of forty-two and was interred in the Yuling Mausoleum for imperial consorts in the Eastern Qing Tombs.

== Titles ==
- During the reign of the Qianlong Emperor (r. 1735–1796):
  - Lady Niohuru (鈕祜祿氏; from 1748)
  - Noble Lady Chang (常貴人; from 1766), sixth rank consort
  - Imperial Concubine Shun (順嬪; from 1768), fifth rank consort
  - Consort Shun (順妃; from 1776), fourth rank consort
  - Imperial Concubine Shun (順嬪; from 1788), fifth rank consort
  - Noble Lady Shun (順貴人; from 1788), sixth rank consort

== In popular culture ==
- Portrayed by Jenny Zhang in 2018 Chinese TV series Story of Yanxi Palace.

== See also ==
- Imperial Chinese harem system § Qing
- Royal and noble ranks of the Qing dynasty
