= Mianxin =

Prince Duanhuai of the First Rank

- Prince Rui of the First Rank 和碩瑞親王

Prince Rui of the First Rank
- Tenure: 14 April 1819 – 27 September 1828
- Successor: Yizhi
- Born: 9 March 1805
- Died: 27 September 1828 (aged 23)
- Burial: Tomb of 2 Princes Rui, Haidian, Beijing
- Spouse: Lady Feimo; Lady Baidu
- Issue: Yizhi; Lady of the Second Rank
Posthumous name
- Prince Ruihuai of the First Rank (瑞懷親王)
- Father: Jiaqing Emperor
- Mother: Empress Xiaoherui

Mianxin (綿忻; 9 March 1805 – 27 September 1828) was an imperial prince of the Qing dynasty and the fourth son of the Jiaqing Emperor. Mianxin was made the first holder of the Prince Rui of the First Rank title in 1819. In contrary to existing iron-cap Prince Rui of the First Rank peerage, the first character in the title was translated into Manchu as "sabingga". (Note: meaning "auspicious") The peerage was not extinct as Mianxin had a legitimate male heir and the peerage was not granted perpetual inheritability, which meant that his successors would hold diminished ranks.

== Life ==
Mianxin was born to Empress Xiaoherui on 9 March 1805 during the latter's reign. In his childhood, Mianxin shared a close relationship with his elder brother, Miankai and Minning, the future Daoguang Emperor who had been adopted by the empress in 1797. In the late Jiaqing era, Mianxin was intended to succeed the weakening Jiaqing Emperor. However, Mianxin was granted a title of the Prince Rui of the First Rank with the character "瑞" at the age of 14 (15 sui).

In 1820, he accompanied his father at the Chengde Mountain Resort. After the death of the emperor the successor was not appointed, leaving a final decision to the Empress Dowager, Lady Niohuru. Lady Niohuru did not appoint Mianxin as a successor, which earned a praise from Minning for avoiding to pursue self-interest into the succession list although the decision was influenced by Minning's report about the secret imperial decree dating back to 1800.

During the national mourning in 1821, Mianxin performed sacrificial rites at the Chang Mausoleum of the Western Qing tombs for 25 days. Before the grand sacrifices at the tomb, Mianxin had been so overwhelmed by grievance that did not attend the rites. In February 1823, Mianxin and Miankai redistributed the meal and monetary aid to the victims of the flood. In 1823, Mianxin gained control over the Ministry of War and Ministry of Personnel. In November 1824, Mianxin presided over the grand sacrifices at the Changling. Due to mismanagement of the printing house of the Hall of Martial Valor in the Forbidden City, Mianxin had his salary decreased, while his assistants received various forms of punishment.

Mianxin died on 27 September 1828 of illness and was posthumously honoured as Prince Ruihuai of the First Rank (和硕瑞怀亲王, meaning "propitious and affectionate"). He was succeeded by his only son, Yizhi.

== Family ==
Mianxin was married to Lady Feimo, daughter of first-class marquis Weiqin, Lebao (一等威勤侯勒保). The wedding banquet was organised on 21 March 1819 at the Hall of Lacking Selfishness (无私殿). The list of operas presented at the banquet included "Distant pair of stairs bringing eternal joy". The princess consort died on 11 April 1827 and was interred at the family mausoleum located in Haidian District, near the Tomb of the Futian duke.

In 1827, Mianxin promoted his secondary consort, lady Baidu, daughter of Master Commandant of Cloud Cavalry Dexing, to second primary consort. Lady Baidu died on 7 June 1853.

Primary Consort

- First primary consort, of the Feimo clan (嫡福晋 费莫氏, d. 11 April 1827)
- Second primary consort, of the Baidu clan (继福晋, d. 7 June 1853)
  瑞亲王侧福晋-->瑞亲王继福晋

Secondary Consort

- Secondary consort, of the Xu clan (侧福晋 徐氏)
  - Lady of the Second Rank (县君, b. 1826–1827), first daughter
    - The marriage was held in 1841.
  - Prince Ruimin of the Second Rank Yizhi (瑞敏郡王奕志, 30 October 1827 – 27 June 1850), first son

Concubine

- Mistress, of the Liu clan (庶福晋 刘氏)

== In fiction and popular culture ==
- Portrayed by Joel Chan in Curse of the Royal Harem (2011)
- Portrayed by Li Zeduo in Beauty at War (2013)
