= Miankai =

Prince Dunke of the First Rank

Prince Dun
- Successor: Yicong
- Born: 6 August 1795; Forbidden City, Beijing, China, Qing dynasty
- Died: 18 January 1838
- Burial: Haidian, Beijing
- Spouse: Lady Niohuru
- Issue: Yizuan
- Father: Jiaqing Emperor
- Mother: Empress Xiaoherui

Miankai (綿愷; 6 August 1795 – 18 January 1838), was a prince of the Qing Dynasty. He was the third son of the Jiaqing Emperor and was made the first holder of Prince Dun of the First Rank peerage. He was the elder brother of Mianxin born by the same consort, Empress Xiaoherui.

== Life ==
In August in the 60th year of Qianlong's reign Miankai was born to Aisin Gioro Yongyan, Prince Jia of the First Rank, and his secondary consort Lady Niohuru. In the eighteenth year of Jiaqing, Miankai followed Mianmin to arrest Cang Zhenmen.

In the twenty-fourth year of Jiaqing, he was appointed as "Prince of The Second Rank" with the designation Dun. A year later, when Minning ascended the throne, he was raised to a prince of the first degree.

In 1823, Miankai's wife, Lady Niohuru, entered the palace through the central gate, instead of the lateral doorways. Miankai tried to deny the charge and to evade. He was reprimanded for insolence, and several of his posts, were taken from him.

In 1826, he was appointed presiding controller of the Imperial Clan and was put in charge of other bureaus and places among which it counts the Imperial Printing Press and of the Summer Palace.

In 1827, he helped a eunuch hiding from the Imperial household and for this his offices were taken from him. Miankai loved music and like watching the theater and never took an interest in study or in archery. His elder half-brother always gave Miankai important posts hoping to help him. Miankai still didn't care much about study and Daoguang Emperor finally punished him and downgraded his title to "Prince of the Second Rank". A year later Miankai was reinstated as "Prince of the First Rank". In 1836 he became, again, the controller of the Imperial clan court. These posts didn't help Miankai to change, he still kept actors in his estate and would often abuse his status as a prince. Anybody who offended him was put in confinement. The Empress Dowager Gongci, his mother, ordered the people to be released and have the actors sent away from his estate. He complied with his mother’s orders but after a while he brought the actors back. In 1838 the wife of one of his prisoners exposed his illegal conduct to the Censorate and an investigation was conducted which disclosed the presence of more than ninety prisoners in his manor. Both the prisoners and actors were sent back to their homes. He was only downgraded again to "Prince of the Second Rank" and was deprived of some privileges of the royal house due to interventions of his mother. He died in 1839 and his title was posthumously restored.

Miankai had no surviving sons to succeed him, Daoguang made his son, Yicong, heir to his princedom.

== Family ==
Primary Consort

- Primary Consort, of the Niohuru clan (嫡福晋 钮祜禄氏)
  - Yizuan, Duke of the Fourth Rank (奕纘; 3 February 1818 – 1 August 1821), first son

Secondary Consort

- Secondary Consort, of the Gao clan (侧福晋 高佳氏)
- Secondary Consort, of the Niohuru Clan (侧福晋 钮祜禄氏)

== See also ==
- Prince Dun
- Royal and noble ranks of the Qing dynasty#Male members
- Ranks of imperial consorts in China#Qing
