= Empress Xiaoshurui =

Empress of China from 1796 to 1797

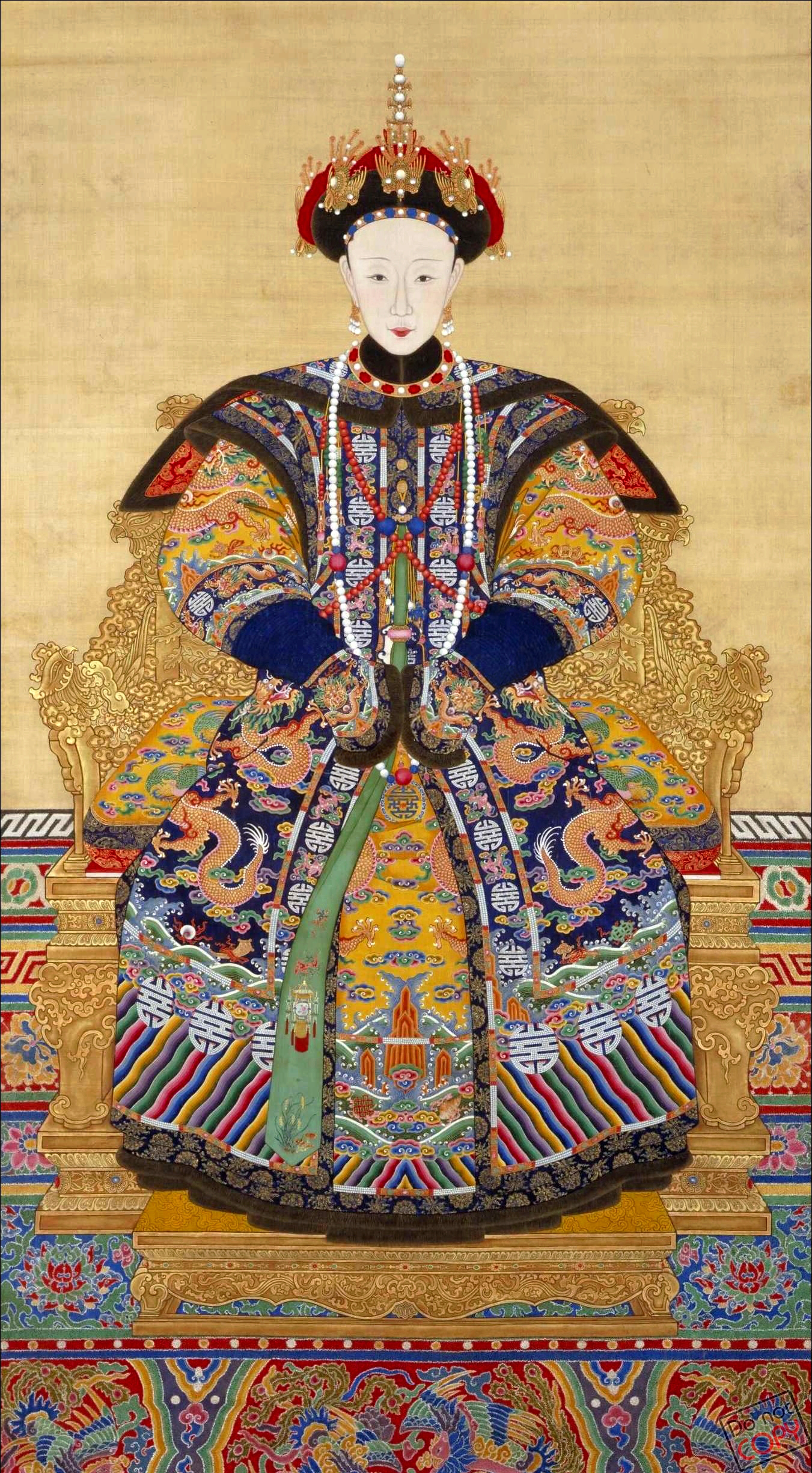
- Qing dynasty portrait of Empress Xiaoshurui, probably late 18th century

Empress consort of the Qing dynasty
- Tenure: 12 February 1796 – 5 March 1797 (1 year, 21 days)
- Predecessor: Empress Nara
- Successor: Empress Xiaoherui
- Born: 2 October 1760 (乾隆二十五年 八月 二十四日)
- Died: 5 March 1797 (aged 36) (嘉慶二年 二月 七日); Forbidden City, Beijing, Qing dynasty
- Burial: Chang Mausoleum, Western Qing tombs
- Spouse: Jiaqing Emperor (m. 1774)
- Issue: Second daughter Daoguang Emperor; Princess Zhuangjing of the First Rank
Posthumous name
- Empress Xiaoshu Duanhe Renzhuang Ciyi Dunyu Zhaosu Guangtian Yousheng Rui (孝淑端和仁莊慈懿敦裕昭肅光天佑聖睿皇后)
- House: Hitara (喜塔臘)
- Father: He'erjing'e (和爾經額)
- Mother: Lady Wanggiya (王佳氏)

Empress Xiaoshurui

Chinese name
- Traditional Chinese: 孝淑睿皇后
- Simplified Chinese: 孝淑睿皇后
Transcriptions
Standard Mandarin
- Hanyu Pinyin: Xiàoshūruì Huánghòu

Manchu name
- Manchu script: ᡥᡳᠶᠣᠣᡧᡠᠩᡤᠠ ᠨᡝᠮᡤᡳᠶᠠᠨ ᠰᡠᠩᡤᡳᠶᡝᠨ ᡥᡡᠸᠠᠩᡥᡝᠣ
- Romanization: hiyoošungga nemgiyan sunggiyen hūwangheo

Empress Xiaoshurui (Chinese: 孝淑睿皇后; 2 October 1760 – 5 March 1797), of the Manchu Plain White Banner Hitara clan was the first empress consort of the Jiaqing Emperor of China's Qing dynasty. She was empress consort from 1796 until her death in 1797, having been empress for barely a year.

== Life ==
=== Family background ===
Empress Xiaoshurui's personal name was not recorded in history.

- Father: He'erjing'e (和爾經額), served as a second rank literary official (總管) in the Imperial Household Department and a second rank military official (副都統), and held the title of a third class duke (三等公)
  - Paternal grandfather: Chang'an (常安)
  - Paternal grandmother: Lady Ligiya
- Mother: Lady Wanggiya
- Siblings: One elder brother (Shengzhu 盛柱) and two younger brother (Mengzhu 孟柱, Lingzhu 齡柱)

=== Qianlong era ===
The future Empress Xiaoshurui was born on the 24th day of the eighth lunar month in the 25th year of the reign of the Qianlong Emperor, which translates to 2 October 1760 in the Gregorian calendar.

On 5 June 1774, Lady Hitara married Yongyan, the 15th son of the Qianlong Emperor, and became his primary consort. She gave birth on 2 June 1780 to his second daughter, who would die prematurely on 6 September 1783, on 16 September 1782 to his second son, Minning, and on 20 October 1784 to his fourth daughter, Princess Zhuangjing of the First Rank. According to Qing dynasty imperial medical records, Empress Xiaoshurui was of good health, but after giving consecutive birth of child, her body started having health problems.

=== Jiaqing era ===
On 9 February 1796, the Qianlong Emperor abdicated in favour of Yongyan and became a Retired Emperor, while Yongyan was enthroned as the Jiaqing Emperor. On 12 February 1796, Lady Hitara, as the emperor's primary consort, was instated as empress consort. The Empress died of illness on 5 March 1797, having been empress for barely a year. On 12 March 1797, cabinet drafted her posthumous title and submitted to Emperor Qianlong for approval. With the following approval of the title, she is honoured with the posthumous title "Empress Xiaoshu".

=== Daoguang era ===
The Jiaqing Emperor died on 2 September 1820 and was succeeded by Minning, who was enthroned as the Daoguang Emperor. In April or May 1821, he extended his mother's posthumous title to "Empress Xiaoshu Duanhe Renzhuang Ciyi Guangtian YouSheng Rui". In his last reign year, he extended the posthumous title with "Dunyu".

Xianfeng era

Her posthumous title is extended with "Zhaosu"

== Titles ==
- During the reign of the Qianlong Emperor (r. 1735–1796):
  - Lady Hitara (from 2 October 1760)
  - Primary consort (嫡福晉; from 5 June 1774)
- During the reign of the Jiaqing Emperor (r. 1796–1820):
  - Empress (皇后; from 12 February 1796)
  - Empress Xiaoshu (孝淑皇后; from 20 May 1797)
- During the reign of the Daoguang Emperor (r. 1820–1850):
  - Empress Xiaoshurui (孝淑睿皇后; from 15 May 1821)

== Issue ==
- As primary consort:
  - The Jiaqing Emperor's second daughter (2 June 1780 – 6 September 1783)
  - Minning (旻寧; 16 September 1782 – 26 February 1850), the Jiaqing Emperor's second son, enthroned on 3 October 1820 as the Daoguang Emperor
  - Princess Zhuangjing of the First Rank (莊靜固倫公主; 20 October 1784 – 27 June 1811), the Jiaqing Emperor's fourth daughter
    - Married Manibadala (瑪尼巴達喇; d. 1832) of the Tumed Borjigit clan in November/December 1802
  - Miscarriage at three months (18 August 1785)

== In fiction and popular culture ==
- Portrayed by Yuen Yi-ling in The Rise and Fall of Qing Dynasty (1988)
- Portrayed by Natalie Wong in Wars of In-laws (2005)
- Portrayed by Sarah Song in Curse of the Royal Harem (2011)
- Portrayed by Jess Sum in Succession War (2018)

== See also ==
- Ranks of imperial consorts in China § Qing
- Royal and noble ranks of the Qing dynasty

== Notes ==
Empress Xiaoshurui Hitara Clan
Chinese royalty
Preceded by Empress of the Nara clan	Empress consort of China; 12 February 1796 – 5 March 1797	Succeeded by Empress Xiaoherui of the Niohuru clan
