= Niohuru =

Manchu clan and family name

Manchu name
- Manchu script: ᠨᡳᠣᡥᡠᡵᡠ

Chinese name
- Traditional Chinese: 鈕祜祿氏
- Simplified Chinese: 钮祜禄氏
Transcriptions
Standard Mandarin
- Hanyu Pinyin: niǔ hù lù shì

Pronunciation respelling name
- Pronunciation respelling: NEE-oh-HOO-roo

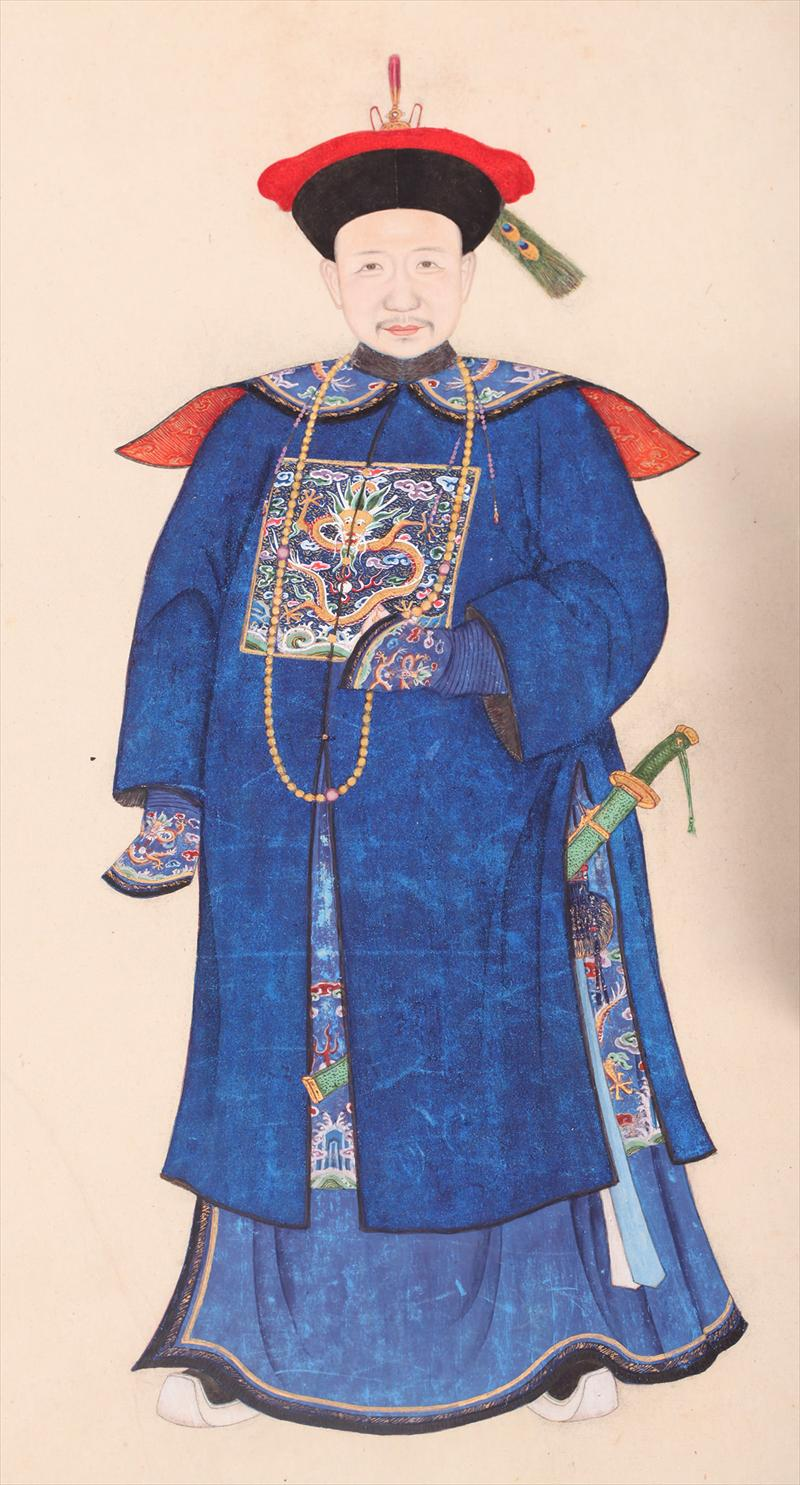
Heshen, a powerful official of the Qianlong era in the Qing dynasty, was of the Niohuru clan

The Niohuru was a prominent Manchu clan during the Qing dynasty. The clan had inhabited the Changbai Mountains since as early as the Liao dynasty. The clan was well known during the Qing dynasty for producing a variety of consorts of all ranks for emperors, several of whom went on to become mothers to reigning emperors. Prominent people who belonged or trace heritage to the Niohuru clan including famed Manchu warrior Eidu, his son the high official Ebilun, the Empress Dowager Ci'an, the infamous corrupt official Heshen and the contemporary concert pianist Lang Lang.

== Distribution ==
Written records of the Niohuru clan dates back to the Liao dynasty (907–1125), when it was known as the Dilie clan (敌烈氏) by Chinese transliteration. The current transliteration Niohuru came into being during the Ming dynasty. The Niohuru clan inhabited the Changbai mountains region of present-day Jilin province in northeast China (otherwise known as "Manchuria"), and also on the banks of the Songhua River and Mudan River.

According to members of the clan who attempted to re-trace their genealogy, the common primogenitor of the vast tribe date back to one Sohoji Bayan (honorific Su Gung), who was six generations removed from Eidu, the first eminent Niohuru clan member in recorded Qing history. The Niohuru were widely distributed throughout the territory of the Manchu empire, and each of the Eight Banners had some Niohurus among their ranks.

Towards the end of the Qing dynasty and particularly after the founding the Republic of China in 1912, many Manchus adopted single-character Chinese surnames based on their clan origin. The Niohuru were known to have adopted to two versions, "Niu" (钮), which could be found in the modern province of Jiangxi in addition to Manchuria; and "Lang" (郎). Lang sounded like "wolf" in Chinese (狼), roughly corresponding to the Manchu root word Niohe for Niohuru meaning "wolf".

Niu 钮 is on the Hundred Family Surnames poem.

== Notable figures ==
=== Males ===
- Eidu (1562–1621), Manchu noble, close associate of Nurhaci
  - Daqi (達啟/达启), Eidu's second son
  - Turgei (圖爾格/图尔格，pinyin:Tu'erge; 1594–1645), Eidu's eighth son; officer of Manchu armies during the reign of Hong Taiji
  - Ebilun (d. 1673), Eidu's 16th son by Mukushen; served as one of the Four Regents of the Kangxi Emperor
    - Necin (訥親/讷亲，pinyin: Neqin; d. 1749), Ebilun's grandson; Manchu overseer of the Board of War during the Qianlong era
    - Alingga (1670–1716), Ebilun's seventh son; official at the court of the Kangxi Emperor
- Heshen (1750–1799), infamous official of the late Qianlong era
  - Fengšeninde (丰绅殷德; 1775–1810), Heshen's first son
- Mukdembu (穆克登布; d. 1803), grandfather of Empress Xiaoquancheng
  - Yiling (頤齡/颐龄), served as a first rank military official (駐防將軍/驻防将军，pinyin:zhufangjiangjun) in Suzhou, and held the title of a third class duke (三等公)
- Sihung Lung (1930–2002), Taiwan actor
- Niu Maosheng (born 1939), Governor of Hebei
- Larry Hsien Ping Lang (born 1956), Hong Kong economist
- Doze Niu (born 1966), Taiwan director
- Lang Lang (born 1982), internationally renowned concert pianist

Prince Consort

Date	Prince Consort	Background	Princess
1608	Daqi		Nurhaci's fifth daughter (1597–1613) by mistress (Giyamuhut Gioro Zhenge)
	Eidu		Nurhaci's fourth daughter (Mukushen; 1595–1659) by mistress (Giyamuhut Gioro Zhenge)
1621	Turgei		Nurhaci's fourth daughter (Mukushen; 1595–1659) by mistress (Giyamuhut Gioro Zhenge)
1790	Fengšeninde		Princess Hexiao (1775–1823), the Qianlong Emperor's tenth daughter by Consort Dun (Wang)
1863	Jalafungga (扎拉豐阿; d. 1898)		Princess Shouxi (1842–1866), the Daoguang Emperor's eighth daughter by Noble Consort Tong (Šumuru)

=== Females ===
Imperial Consort

- Empress
  - Empress Xiaozhaoren (1659–1678), the Kangxi Emperor's second empress
  - Empress Xiaoshengxian (1692–1777), the Yongzheng Emperor's noble consort, the mother of the Qianlong Emperor (1711–1799)
  - Empress Xiaoherui (1776–1850), the Jiaqing Emperor's second empress, the mother of seventh daughter (1793–1795), Miankai (1795–1838) and Mianxin (1805–1828)
  - Empress Xiaomucheng (1781–1808), the Daoguang Emperor's first primary consort
  - Empress Xiaoquancheng (1808–1840), the Daoguang Emperor's second empress, the mother of Princess Duanshun (1825–1835), Princess Shou'an (1826–1860) and the Xianfeng Emperor (1831–1861)
  - Empress Xiaozhenxian (1837–1881), the Xianfeng Emperor's empress
- Imperial Noble Consort
  - Imperial Noble Consort Gongshun (1787–1860), the Jiaqing Emperor's consort, the mother of eighth daughter (1805–1806), Princess Huimin (1811–1815) and Mianyu (1814–1865)
- Noble Consort
  - Noble Consort Wenxi (1661–1694), the Kangxi Emperor's noble consort, the mother of Yun'e (1683–1741) and 11th daughter (1685–1686)
  - Noble Consort Cheng (1813–1888), the Daoguang Emperor's noble lady
- Consort
  - Consort Xiang (1808–1861), the Daoguang Emperor's noble lady, the mother of second daughter (1825), Princess Shouzang (1829–1856) and Yicong (1831–1889)
- Imperial Concubine
  - Imperial Concubine Cheng (d. 1784), the Qianlong Emperor's imperial concubine
- Noble Lady
  - Noble Lady Shun (1749–1780), the Qianlong Emperor's noble lady

Princess Consort

- Primary Consort
  - Hong Taiji's first primary consort (1593–1612), the mother of Lobohoi (1611–1617)
  - Yunli's primary consort
  - Yongrong's second primary consort, the mother of Mianxin (1775–1777), Princess (b. 1776) and Mianqing (1779–1804)
  - Yonglin's first primary consort (d. 1801), the mother of Mianheng (1790), second son (1793–1795) and second daughter (1796–1801)
  - Miankai's primary consort, the mother of Yizuan (1818–1821)
  - Yihe's primary consort (d. 1871)
- Secondary Consort
  - Yunbi's secondary consort, the mother of Lady (b. 1738) and Hongkang (1747–1814)
- Concubine
  - Nurhaci's concubine, the mother of Tanggūdai (1585–1640) and Tabai (1589–1639)
  - The Kangxi Emperor's concubine, the mother of 20th daughter (1708 – 1708 or 1709)
  - Changning's concubine, the mother of sixth daughter (1684–1712)
- Lang Tsuyun 郎祖筠, Taiwanese entertainment personality, famous for TV, movie and stage acting, singer, writer and producer.
- Niohuru X, Chinese American drag artist and winner of the Boulet Brother's Dragula competition

== Gallery ==
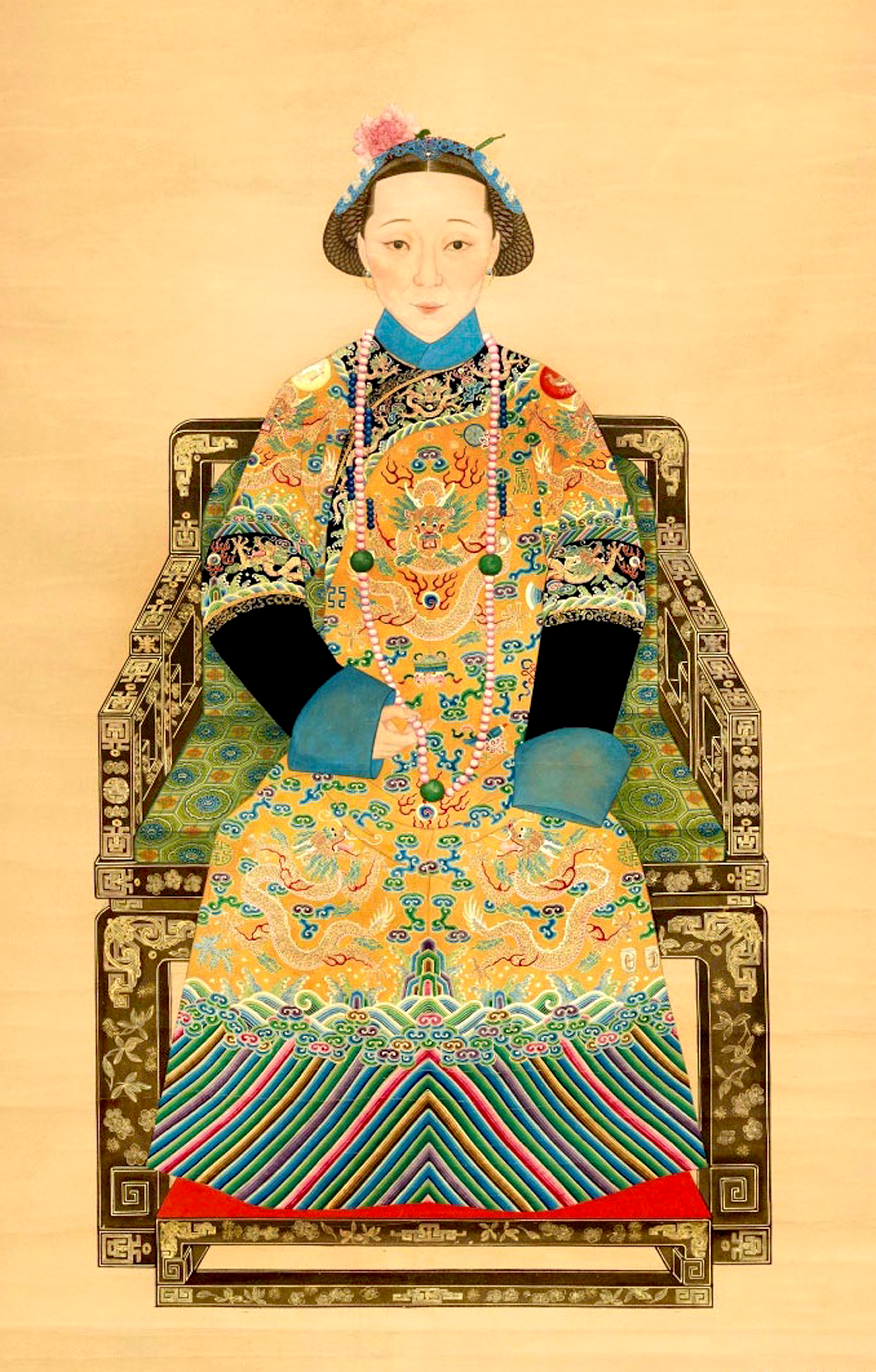
Empress Dowager Ci'an

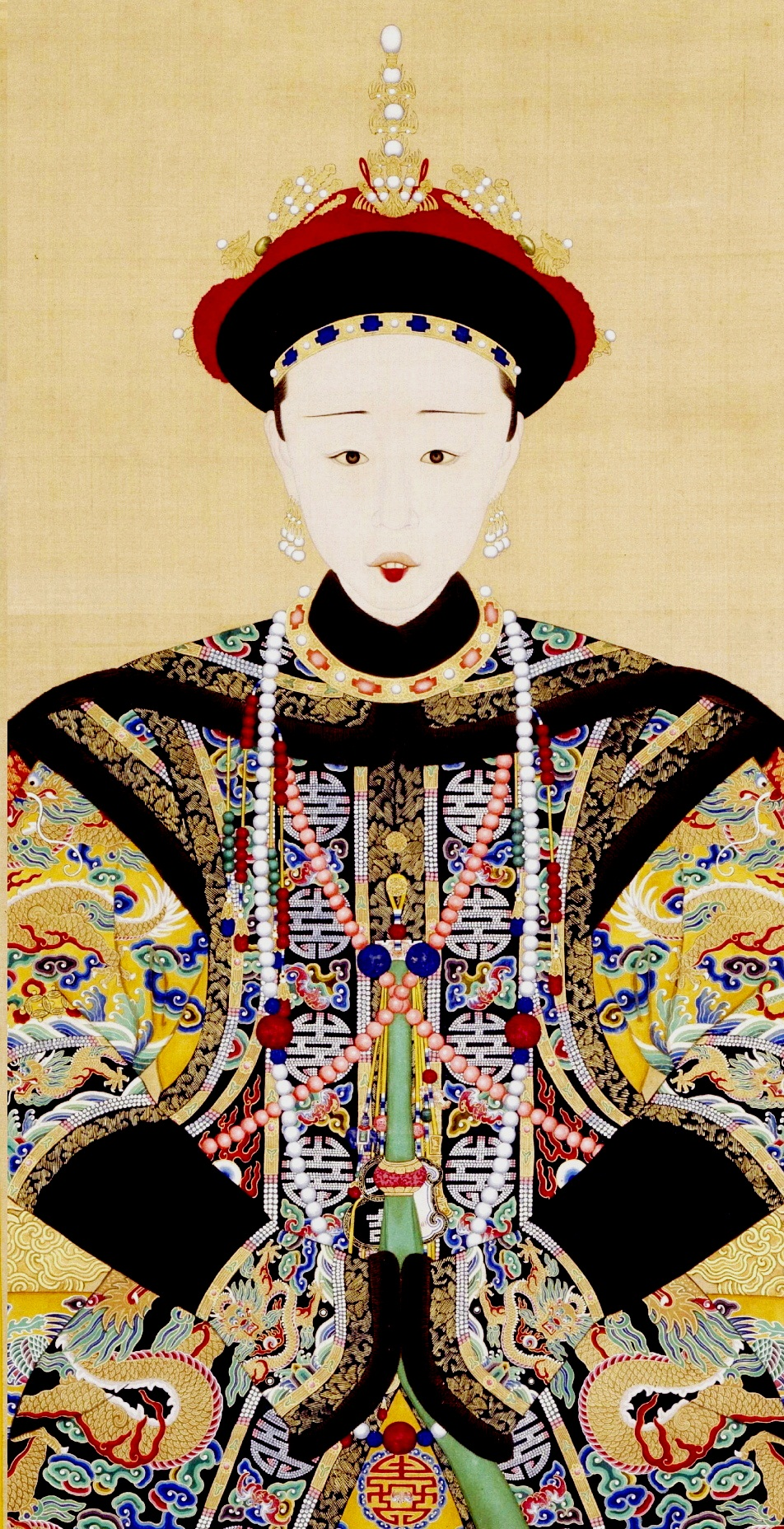
Empress Xiaoquancheng in court dress

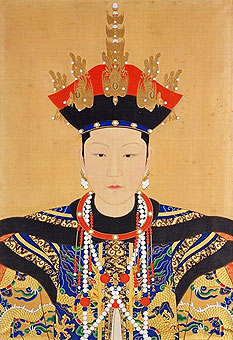
Empress Xiaozhaoren in court dress

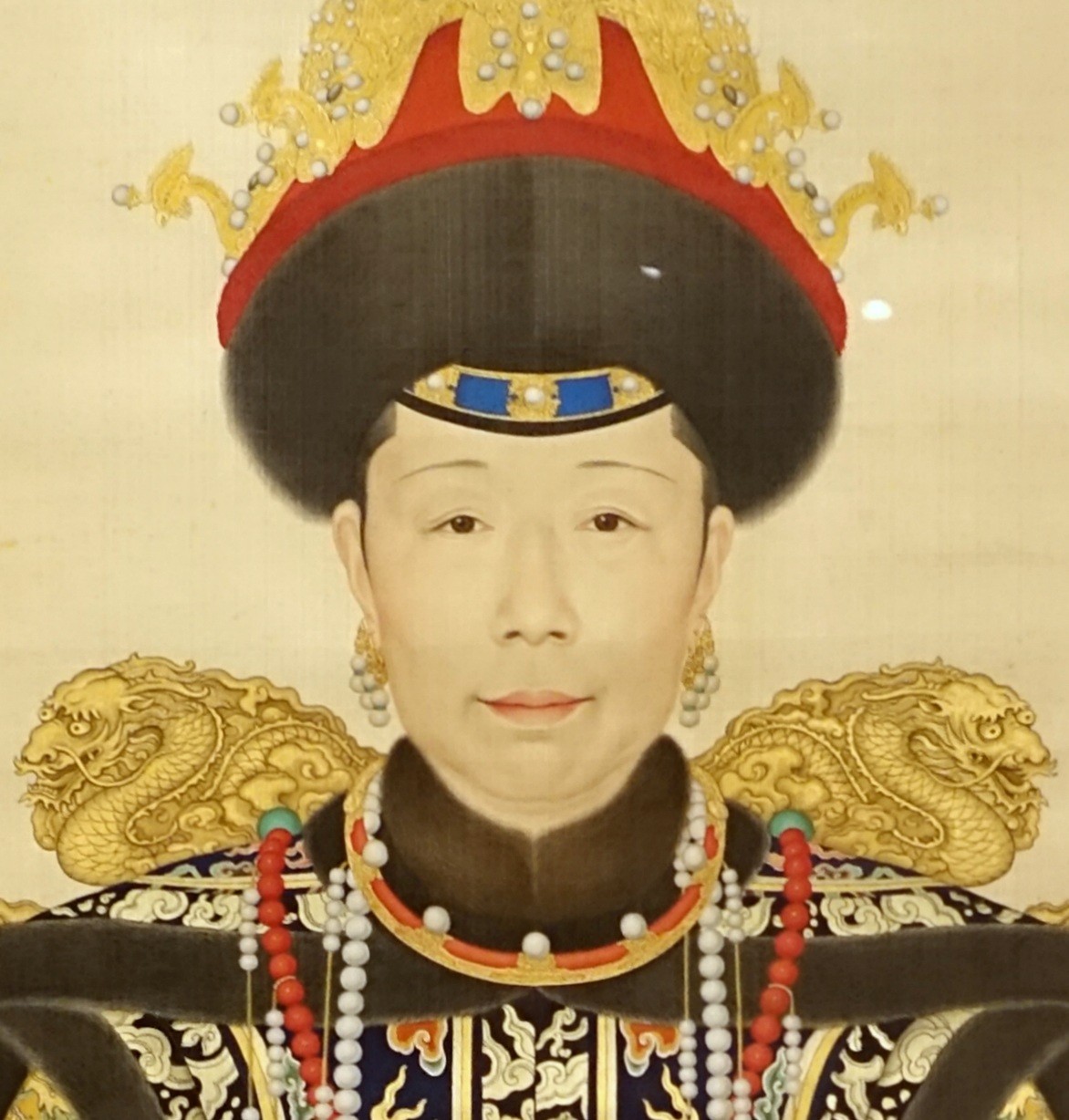
Empress Xiaoshengxian in court dress, by Giuseppe Castiglione

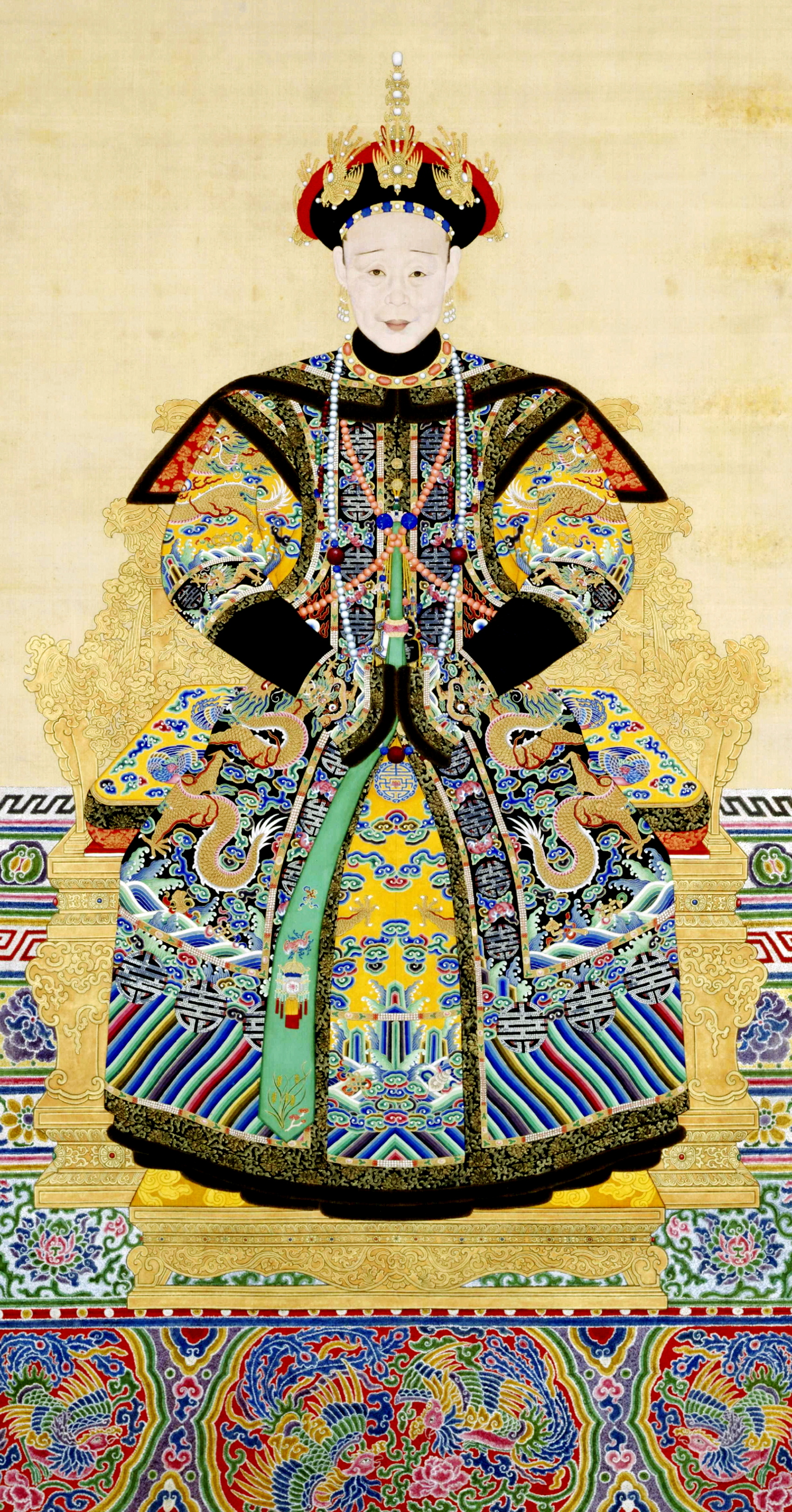
Empress Xiaoherui in court dress

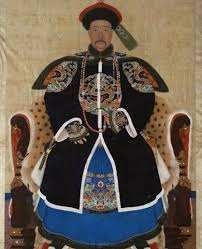
An imperial portrait of Ebilun

== See also ==
- List of Manchu clans
