= Empress Xiaoherui =

Empress of China from 1801 to 1820

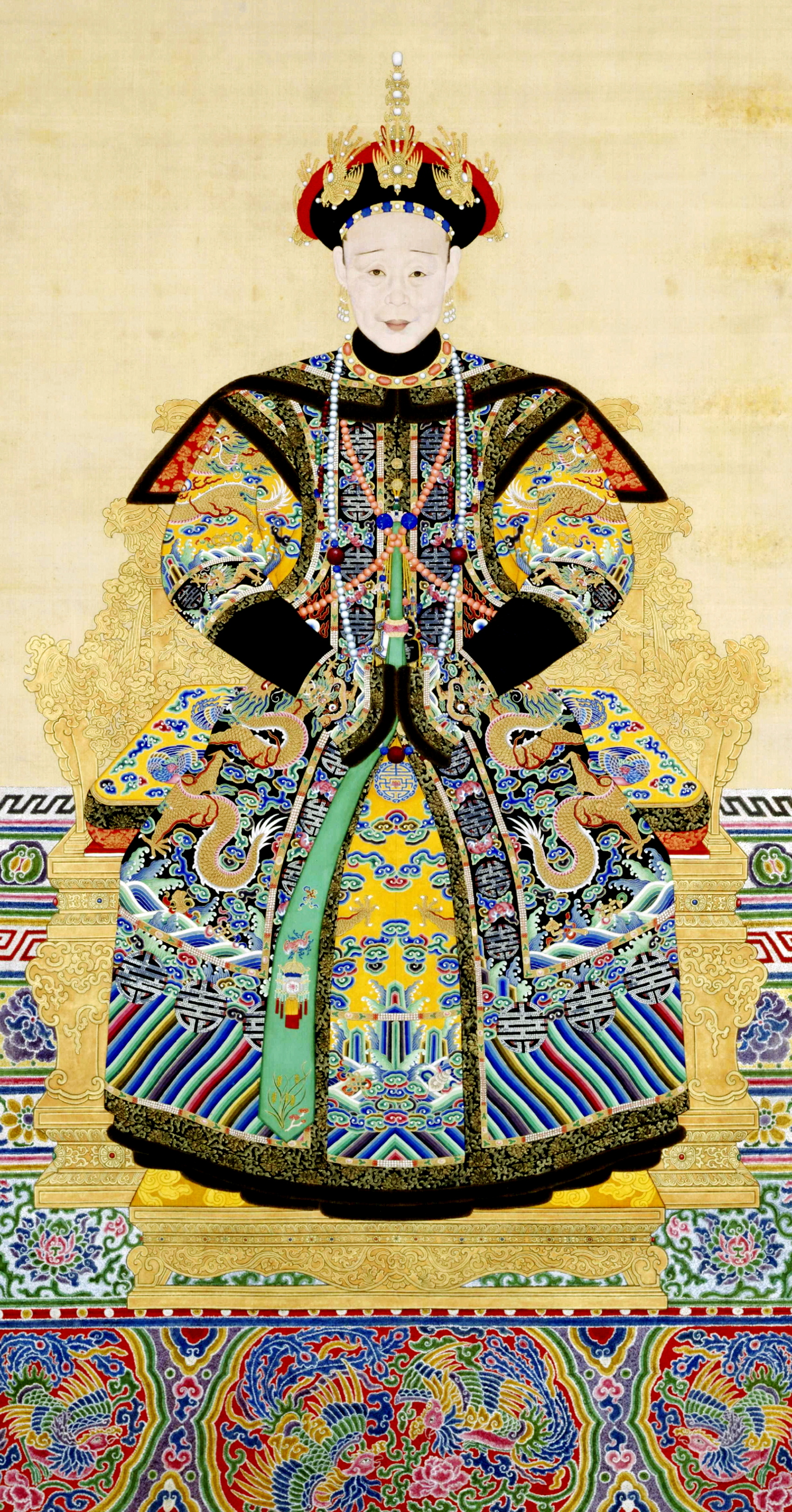
- Qing Dynasty portrait of Empress Xiaoherui

Empress consort of the Qing dynasty
- Tenure: 27 May 1801 – 2 September 1820 (19 years, 98 days)
- Predecessor: Empress Xiaoshurui
- Successor: Empress Xiaoshencheng

Empress dowager of the Qing dynasty
- Tenure: 2 September 1820 – 23 January 1850 (29 years, 143 days)
- Predecessor: Empress Dowager Chongqing
- Successor: Empress Dowager Kangci
- Born: 20 November 1776 (乾隆四十一年 十月 十日)
- Died: 23 January 1850 (aged 73) (道光二十九年 十二月 十一日); Shoukang Palace, Forbidden City, Beijing, Qing China
- Burial: Chang Mausoleum, Western Qing tombs
- Spouse: Jiaqing Emperor (m. 1790; died 1820)
- Issue: Seventh daughter Miankai, Prince Dunke of the First Rank; Mianxin, Prince Ruihuai of the First Rank
Posthumous name
- Empress Xiaohe Gongci Kangyu Ancheng Qinshun Renzheng Yingtian Xisheng Rui (孝和恭慈康豫安成欽順仁正應天熙聖睿皇后)
- House: Niohuru (鈕祜祿)
- Father: Gūnggala (恭阿拉)
- Mother: Lady Yehe Nara

Empress Xiaoherui

Chinese name
- Traditional Chinese: 孝和睿皇后
- Simplified Chinese: 孝和睿皇后
Transcriptions
Standard Mandarin
- Hanyu Pinyin: Xiàohéruì Huánghòu

Manchu name
- Manchu script: ᡥᡳᠶᠣᠣᡧᡠᠩᡤᠠ ᡥᡡᠸᠠᠯᡳᠶᠠᠰᡠᠨ ᠰᡠᠩᡤᡳᠶᡝᠨ ᡥᡡᠸᠠᠩᡥᡝᠣ
- Romanization: hiyoošungga hūwaliyasun sunggiyen hūwangheo

Empress Xiaoherui (20 November 1776 – 23 January 1850), of the Manchu Bordered Yellow Banner Niohuru clan, was the second empress consort of the Jiaqing Emperor of the Qing dynasty of China. She was empress consort from 1801 until her husband's death in 1820, after which she was honoured as Empress Dowager Gongci during the reign of her step-son, the Daoguang Emperor. She was the longest-serving empress consort in the Qing dynasty's history.

== Life ==
=== Family background ===
Empress Xiaoherui's personal name was not recorded in history.

- Father: Gūnggala (恭阿拉), served as the Minister of Works from 1810 to 1811, the Minister of War from 1811 to 1812 and the Minister of Rites from 1804 to 1810 and from 1812 to 1813, and held the title of a first class duke (一等公)
  - Paternal grandfather: Gongbao (公寶/公宝)
  - Paternal grandmother: Lady Nara
- Mother: Lady Yehe Nara
  - Maternal grandfather: Baiming (白明)
- One elder brother and two younger brothers
  - First elder brother: Ningwutai (宁武泰)
  - First younger brother: Heshitai (和世泰), served as a Minister of Works in 1819
  - Second younger brother: Jiluntai (吉伦泰)
- Two younger sisters
  - First younger sister: Primary Princess Consort Ruiqin of the First Rank (wife of Duan'en)
  - Second younger sister

=== Qianlong era ===
The future Empress Xiaoherui was born on the tenth day of the tenth lunar month in the 41st year of the reign of the Qianlong Emperor, which translates to 20 November 1776 in the Gregorian calendar.

In 1790, Lady Niohuru became a secondary consort of Yongyan, the 15th son of the Qianlong Emperor. She gave birth on 2 August 1793 to his seventh daughter, who would die prematurely in July or August 1795, and on 6 August 1795 to his third son, Miankai.

=== Jiaqing era ===
On 9 February 1796, the Qianlong Emperor abdicated in favour of Yongyan and became a Retired Emperor, while Yongyan was enthroned as the Jiaqing Emperor. On 12 February 1796, Lady Niohuru was granted the title "Noble Consort".

When the Jiaqing Emperor's primary consort, Empress Xiaoshurui, died of illness on 5 March 1797, the Noble Consort was placed in charge of the imperial harem as the highest rank concubine in that time, and was elevated to "Imperial Noble Consort". The Jiaqing Emperor wanted to make the Imperial Noble Consort his new empress consort but had to wait until the mourning period for Empress Xiaoshurui was over. The Qianlong Emperor died on 7 February 1799 so the Imperial Noble Consort's promotion to empress was delayed until 27 May 1801.

The Empress was put in charge of the upbringing of Minning, the Jiaqing Emperor's second son who was born to Empress Xiaoshurui. She took care of Minning and treated him well, and they shared a close and harmonious relationship.

On 9 March 1805, The Empress gave birth to the emperor's fourth son, Mianxin.

=== Daoguang era ===
When the Jiaqing Emperor died on 2 September 1820 before designating one of his sons as Crown Prince, the decision on the succession was left to Lady Niohuru, who became Empress dowager. The Empress dowager proclaimed Minning the new emperor before an imperial edict was officially issued. She ordered her servants to deliver the message to Minning, who was away in Chengde at the time. Minning rushed back to the Forbidden City and was enthroned as the Daoguang Emperor.

The Daoguang Emperor was extremely pleased with the Empress dowager's decision to make him emperor, claiming that she was broad-minded because she did not misuse her power to name either of her two sons as the new emperor. The Daoguang Emperor also granted her the title "Empress Dowager Gongci". She moved to the Forbidden City's Palace of Longevity and Health, which was traditionally a residence of the emperor's mother.

In 1836, Empress Dowager Gongci celebrated her 60th birthday. The Daoguang Emperor donned his formal court regalia for the occasion. He first went to the Hall of Central Harmony, where he read a memorial for the Empress dowager to wish her well. He then mounted a cart and rode through the right Wing Gate to the left Gate of Eternal Health, where he disembarked. Carrying the memorial in his hands, the Emperor was accompanied by an entourage of nobles and high-ranking officials. After the Emperor delivered his message and birthday gifts, the retinue jointly presented Empress Dowager Gongci with a court scepter.

On 10 April 1838, Empress Dowager Gongci and the Daoguang Emperor visited the Western Qing tombs for 13 days.

Empress Dowager Gongci died on 23 January 1850. She was posthumously granted the title "Empress Xiaoherui", and was interred in a separate tomb near the Chang Mausoleum of the Western Qing tombs.

== Titles ==
- During the reign of the Qianlong Emperor (r. 1735–1796):
  - Lady Niohuru (from 20 November 1776)
  - Secondary consort (側福晉; from 1790)
- During the reign of the Jiaqing Emperor (r. 1796–1820):
  - Noble Consort (貴妃; from 12 February 1796), third rank consort
  - Imperial Noble Consort (皇貴妃; from 14 June 1797), second rank consort
  - Empress (皇后; from 27 May 1801)
- During the reign of the Daoguang Emperor (r. 1820–1850):
  - Empress Dowager Gongci (恭慈皇太后; from 2 September 1820)
  - Empress Xiaoherui (孝和睿皇后; from 12 April 1850)

== Issue ==
- As secondary consort:
  - The Jiaqing Emperor's seventh daughter (2 August 1793 – 16 July 1795)
  - Miankai (綿愷; 6 August 1795 – 18 January 1838), the Jiaqing Emperor's third son, granted the title Prince Dun of the Second Rank in 1819, elevated to Prince Dun of the First Rank in 1821, posthumously honoured as Prince Dunke of the First Rank
- As Empress:
  - Mianxin (綿忻; 9 March 1805 – 27 September 1828), the Jiaqing Emperor's fourth son, granted the title Prince Rui of the First Rank in 1819, posthumously honoured as Prince Ruihuai of the First Rank

== Ancestry of Xiaoherui ==
Ancestry of Empress Xiaoherui

Xiyuan
Gongbao
Lady Guwalgiya
Gong'ala
Zhulong'a
Lady Nara
Empress Xiaoherui
Baiming
Lady Yehe Nara

== In fiction and popular culture ==
- Portrayed by Poon Sin-yi in The Rise and Fall of Qing Dynasty (1988)
- Portrayed by Rebecca Chan in War and Beauty (2004)
- Portrayed by Sun Yifei in Legend of Jiaqing (2005)
- Portrayed by Gigi Wong in Curse of the Royal Harem (2011)
- Portrayed by Selena Lee in Succession War (2018)

== See also ==
- Ranks of imperial consorts in China#Qing
- Royal and noble ranks of the Qing dynasty

== Notes ==
Empress Xiaoherui Niohuru Clan Born: 1776 Died: 1850
Chinese royalty
Preceded by Empress Xiaoshurui of the Manchu Hitara clan	Empress consort of China; 27 May 1801 – 2 September 1820	Succeeded by Empress Xiaoshencheng of the Tunggiya clan
Preceded by Empress Dowager Chongqing (Xiaoshengxian) of the Niohuru clan	Empress dowager of China; 2 September 1820 – 23 January 1850	Succeeded by Empress Dowager Kangci (Xiaojingcheng) of the Niohuru clan
