= Noble Consort Wenxi =

- Died: 19 December 1694 (康熙三十三年 十一月 三日); Forbidden City, Beijing, Qing China
- Burial: Jing Mausoleum, Eastern Qing tombs
- Spouse: Kangxi Emperor (before 1694)
- Issue: Yun'e; Unnamed daughter
Posthumous name
- Noble Consort Wenxi (溫僖貴妃)
- House: Niohuru (鈕祜祿氏; by birth); Aisin Gioro (by marriage)
- Father: Ebilun
- Mother: Lady Šušu Gioro (舒舒覺羅氏)

Noble Consort Wenxi
- Traditional Chinese: 溫僖貴妃
- Simplified Chinese: 温僖贵妃
Transcriptions
Standard Mandarin
- Hanyu Pinyin: Wēnxī Guìfēi

Noble Consort Wenxi (? – 19 December 1694), of the Manchu Bordered Yellow Banner Niohuru clan, was a consort of the Kangxi Emperor of China's Qing dynasty.

== Life ==
Noble Consort Wenxi's personal name was not recorded in history.

=== Family background ===
Noble Consort Wenxi's family was much more prestigious when compared to the maternal families of the other sons of the Kangxi Emperor, apart from Yinreng. Her paternal grandmother, Mukushen, was Nurhaci's daughter, which would make the Kangxi Emperor and Noble Consort Wenxi second cousins. When she died in 1694, her younger brother, Alingga, represented her family in mourning.

- Father: Ebilun (遏必隆; ? – 1673), served as one of the Four Regents of the Kangxi Emperor, and held the title of a first class duke (一等公)
  - Paternal grandfather: Eidu (額亦都; 1562–1621)
  - Paternal grandmother: Mukushen (穆庫什; 1595–1659), Nurhaci's fourth daughter
- Mother: Lady Šušu-Gioro (舒舒觉罗氏), a secondary wife
- Seven brothers
  - First elder brother: Sailin (塞林), third class imperial guard (三等侍卫)
  - Second elder brother : unnamed
  - Third younger brother: Faka (法喀; 17 May 1664 – 9 February 1713), first class duke (一等公)
  - Fourth younger brother: Yanzhu (颜珠; ? – 1665), first class imperial guard (一等侍卫)
  - Fifth younger brother: Fubao (富保; ? – 1678), second class imperial guard (任二等侍卫)
  - Sixth younger brother: Yinde (尹德), First Class Duke (一等公)
  - Seventh younger half-brother: Alingga (阿靈阿; 1670–1716)
- Five sisters
  - First elder sister: Princess Consort, wife of Zhashen (扎什) of the Mongol Barin clan (巴林氏)
  - Second elder sister: Empress Xiaozhaoren (1653 – 18 March 1678)
  - Fourth younger half-sister: Duchess of the Fourth Rank, wife of Yunsheng (云升) of the Aisin-Gioro clan (愛新覺羅氏)
  - Fifth younger sister: First Class Viscountess, wife of Ayushen (阿玉什)
  - Sixth younger sister: Mistress of Kangxi (咯咯), mother of 20th daughter

=== Kangxi era ===
It is not known when Lady Niohuru entered the Forbidden City and became a mistress of the Kangxi Emperor. She was first mentioned in official histories on 28 January 1682 when the Kangxi Emperor granted ranks and titles to his consorts. She was granted the title of "Noble Consort". As she was the only one among the imperial consorts to hold that rank, she did not receive a title to distinguish her from the others.

She gave birth on 28 November 1683 to the emperor's tenth son, Yun'e, and on 24 October 1685 to his 11th daughter, who would die prematurely in June or July 1686.

On 17 December 1694, Lady Niohuru became critically ill. She died two days later and was interred in the Jing Mausoleum of the Eastern Qing tombs. She was granted the posthumous title "Noble Consort Wenxi".

== Titles ==
- During the reign of the Shunzhi Emperor (r. 1643–1661) or the Kangxi Emperor (r. 1661–1722):
  - Lady Niohuru (鈕祜祿氏)
- During the reign of the Kangxi Emperor (r. 1661–1722):
  - Noble Consort (貴妃; from 28 January 1682), third rank imperial consort
  - Noble Consort Wenxi (溫僖貴妃; from 29 December 1694)

== Issue ==
- As Noble Consort:
  - Yun'e (輔國公 允䄉; 28 November 1683 – 18 October 1741), the Kangxi Emperor's 18th (10th) son
  - Unnamed daughter (24 October 1685 – June/July 1686), the Kangxi Emperor's 11th daughter

== Media ==
- Noble Consort Wenxi is briefly mentioned by the Empress Dowager in the 2011 Chinese television series Empresses in the Palace. She is described as a superior woman who obtained the former Emperor's favor in a conversation between the Empress Dowager and Longkodo.

== See also ==
- Imperial Chinese harem system#Qing
- Royal and noble ranks of the Qing dynasty
