= Ebilun =

Regent of China from 1661 to 1667

First Class Duke Ebilun
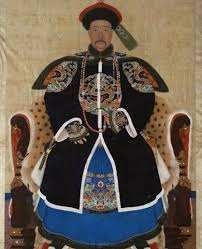
- Portrait of Ebilun, 17th century

Regent of the Qing Dynasty
- In office 5 February 1661 – 12 August 1667 Serving with Sonin, Suksaha, Oboi
- Monarch: Kangxi Emperor

Personal details
- Died: 1673
- Spouse(s): Ladi Aisin Gioro; Lady Aisin Gioro; Lady Bayara; Lady Susu Gioro
- Children: 6 daughter and 7 sons
- Parent(s): Eidu (father); Princess Mukushen (mother)
- Relatives: Nurhaci (maternal grandfather); Empress Xiaozhaoren (daughter); Noble Consort Wenxi (daughter); Alingga (son)
- Clan name: Niohuru
- Posthumous name: Kexi (恪僖)

Military service
- Allegiance: Qing dynasty
- Branch/service: Manchu Bordered Yellow Banner

Ebilun (Manchu:ᡝᠪᡳᠯᡠᠨ, Möllendorff: ebilun; Chinese: 遏必隆; pinyin: Èbìlóng; died 1673) was a Manchu noble and warrior of the Niohuru clan, most famous for being one of the Four Regents assisting the young Kangxi Emperor from 1661 to 1667, during the early Qing dynasty (1644–1912). A largely passive figure during the regency, Ebilun was disgraced following the ouster of the far more powerful regent Oboi and considered a political supporter of the latter. He was stripped of his positions by the emperor but later regained his noble rank. Many of his descendants became influential figures in the Qing imperial government.

== Biography ==
Ebilun was from the Niohuru clan, which lived north of the Korean border and belonged to the Bordered Yellow Banner. He was the sixteenth of the seventeen sons of Eidu (1562–1621), who had been a close associate of Manchu patriarch Nurhaci. Ebilun's mother was herself a daughter of Nurhaci.

In 1634, the second Qing emperor Hong Taiji (r. 1626 – 1643) gave Eidu a posthumous rank of viscount, which Ebilun immediately inherited but lost in 1637 after he tried to interfere in a trial involving his niece. In 1643 Ebilun followed Nurhaci's seventh son Abatai in forays inside North China and was credited with the capture of several towns. In 1645 and 1646, after the Qing had defeated the Ming dynasty and made Beijing their capital, Ebilun served under Lekedehun in campaigns to dislodge Ming loyalist He Tengjiao from Hubei and was rewarded with a minor hereditary rank. Yet his position was not assured. Because he belonged to the Yellow Banners, Ebilun was treated with suspicion by Dorgon (the Prince Regent of the young Shunzhi Emperor), whose power base was in the White Banners.

In 1648, during the persecution of Hooge, Dorgon's main rival, Ebilun's nephew accused Ebilun of having opposed Dorgon during the 1643 succession. Ebilun was sentenced to death, but his penalty was commuted. Half of his property was nonetheless confiscated and his minor nobility title was revoked.

The Shunzhi emperor restored Ebilun's titles after Dorgon's death, and eventually entrusted Ebilun with three others to assist the rule of his son (the Kangxi Emperor), who ascended the throne in 1661 at the age of seven. Of the four regents, Ebilun was ranked third, after Sonin and Suksaha, and before Oboi. In practice Ebilun acquiesced to Oboi on nearly all decisions, as the latter gained increasing power. Ebilun also played a role in the ouster of Suksaha, which, after the infirm Sonin died, left Oboi the unchallenged top political figure at court. In 1667, after the Kangxi Emperor assumed personal rule, Ebilun was given the title of a first-class duke. In 1669, Manchu noble Giyesu memorialized the Kangxi Emperor listing 21 crimes supposedly committed by Ebilun shortly after the emperor had moved against Oboi. Ebilun was then sentenced to death. The sentence was later commuted, and Ebilun retained his title, which could be inherited by his descendants.

== Family and descendants ==
Ebilun belonged to the Eidu line of Niohuru clan nobles, many of whom would go on to serve with distinction in the imperial service. He had five sons. The eldest, Faka, inherited Ebilun's title of duke in 1667, only to lose it several years later.

Ebilun's sixth son, Yende, served as an official under the Yongzheng Emperor (r. 1722–1735), and in turn Yende's own son, Tsereng, served as Viceroy of Huguang; Yende's second son, Necin, served on the Grand Council of the Qianlong Emperor (r. 1735–1796). Three of Ebilun's daughters became imperial consorts of the Kangxi Emperor, one becoming his empress consort.

Ebilun's seventh son, Alingga, was a main figure in the succession battle among the sons of the Kangxi Emperor.

Parents

- Father: Eidu (額亦都; 1562 – 1621) close associate of Nurhaci
- Mother: Princess of the Second Rank (和碩公主; 1595 – June/July 1659), personal name Mukushen (穆庫什), Nurhaci's fourth daughter

Consort and Issue:

- Wife, of the Aisin-Gioro clan (嫡妻愛新覺羅氏)
- Second Wife, of the Aisin-Gioro clan (繼妻愛新覺羅氏)
- Third Wife, of the Bayara clan (三繼妻巴雅拉氏)
  - Lady Niohuru, Duchess of the Fourth Rank (钮祜禄氏; d.1725), 4th daughter
    - Married Yunsheng, Duke of the Fourth Rank (雲升輔國公), of the Aisin-Gioro clan; son of Gose (高塞), Duke Quehou of the First Rank (鎮國愨厚公)
  - Alingga, First Class Duke (阿靈阿一等公;1670–1716), 7th son
    - Arsungga
      - Lady Niohoru, Concubine Cheng (誠嬪; died 29 May 1784)
        - Married Emperor Qianlong of Qing
- Secondary Wife, of the Šušu-Gioro clan (側室舒舒覺羅氏)
  - Lady Niohuru, Empress Xiaozhaoren (钮祜禄氏 孝昭仁皇后; 1653 – 18 March 1678), 2nd daughter
    - Married Emperor Kangxi of Qing
  - Lady Niohuru, Noble Consort Wenxi (钮祜禄氏溫僖貴妃; d. 19 December 1694), 3rd daughter
    - Married Emperor Kangxi of Qing and had issues ( 1 son and 1 daughter)
  - Faka, First Class Duke (一等公法喀; 17 May 1664 – 9 February 1713), 3rd son
  - Yanzhu, First Class Imperial guard (一等侍衛顔珠; d. 1665), 4th son
  - Fubao, Second Class Imperial guard (二等侍衛富保; d. 1678), 5th son
  - Yende, First Class Duke (一等公尹德), 6th son
    - Aibida
      - Lady Niohoru, Noble Lady Shun (順貴人; 3 January 1748 – 9 September 1790)
- Unknown
  - Lady Niohuru, Princess Consort (钮祜禄氏), 1st daughter
    - Married Zhashi (札什), of the Mongol Barin clan (巴林氏)
  - Sailin, Third Class Imperial Guard (塞林三等侍衛), 1st son
  - Second son
  - Lady Niohuru, First Class Viscountess (钮祜禄氏), 5th daughter
    - Married Ayushi, First Class Viscount (一等子阿玉什)
  - Lady Niohuru, Mistress (钮祜禄氏), 6th daughter
    - Married Kangxi Emperor and had issues (1 daughter)

== Bibliography ==
- Fang, Chao-ying (1943). "Lekedehun" . In Hummel, Arthur W. Sr. (ed.). Eminent Chinese of the Ch'ing Period. United States Government Printing Office. pp. 443–444.
- Kennedy, George A. (1943). "Ebilun" . In Hummel, Arthur W. Sr. (ed.). Eminent Chinese of the Ch'ing Period. United States Government Printing Office. pp. 219–21.
- Kennedy, George A. (1943). "Eidu" . In Hummel, Arthur W. Sr. (ed.). Eminent Chinese of the Ch'ing Period. United States Government Printing Office. pp. 221–22.
- Oxnam, Robert B. (1975), Ruling from Horseback: Manchu Politics in the Oboi Regency, 1661–1669, Chicago and London: University of Chicago Press.
- Rawski, Evelyn S. (1998), The Last Emperors: A Social History of Qing Imperial Institutions, Berkeley, Los Angeles, and London: University of California Press, ISBN 9780520926790.

== See also ==
- Breaking the Chains
- University of Southern California: Chinese History
