= Alingga =

Alingga (Chinese: 阿靈阿; pinyin: Ēlíng'ē, Manchu: ᠠᠯᡳᠩᡤᠠ; c.1670–1716), of the Niohuru clan, was a Manchu noble of the Bordered Yellow Banner. An official at court during the late reign of the Kangxi Emperor, Alingga played a major role in the succession struggle between the sons of the emperor. Born into a prominent imperial family as the son of Ebilun, Alingga's sister was one of the Kangxi Emperor's highly ranked consorts, and his daughter married Yunli, the Prince Guo.

== Biography ==
Alingga's birthdate is unknown. He was the seventh son of Ebilun, one of the main advisors to the Kangxi Emperor in the latter's early reign, Alingga grew up in a prominent household. He initially was an imperial bodyguard, then niru (佐領). Alingga became a top officer of the emperor's personal protection unit and the Manchu head of the Bordered Yellow Banner military force. His elder sister was Noble Consort Wenxi (溫僖貴妃), a highly ranked imperial consort of the Kangxi Emperor. After she died, Alingga represented his family in mourning her.

Alingga did not get along with his older brother Faka (法喀) and frequently attempted to cast sorcery spells against him. Alingga had inherited the first-class duke title originally bestowed upon Faka after the death of their father. Faka complained about Alingga's behavior to the emperor. The emperor, incensed at Alingga, dismissed him from his posts but retained his noble title. He was later restored as a first-class bodyguard and a leader of the Plain Blue Banner Mongol forces. He later was named an officer of the imperial guard, and minister responsible for Lifan Yuan. In 1708, the 47th year of Kangxi's reign, Alingga became one of the most vocal supporters of Yunsi for the position of crown prince, and was criticized by the emperor, as Yunsi was not in imperial favor. Alingga died in 1716, the 55th year of Kangxi's reign. His daughter Lady Niohuru became wife to Yunli, the Prince Guo. He was also father of Arsungga, a major official during the reign of the Yongzheng Emperor.

The Yongzheng Emperor reserved particular scorn for Alingga, possibly as a result of the latter's endorsement of Yunsi during the battle for succession. In 1735, the Yongzheng Emperor said to his assembled officials, "in today's court, the most treacherous, most selfishly bent on seeking their own gain; the worst of them are Alingga and Kuiju". The emperor accused Alingga of spreading rumors in order to support the cause of Yunsi assuming the position of crown prince. Additionally, the emperor placed on Alingga's tombstone the remarks "he was not a good subject, not a good younger brother, violent, and mediocre."

== In popular culture ==
Alingga appeared as a character in numerous Chinese television series, including Yongzheng Dynasty, Scarlet Heart, and Palace II. Contemporary understandings of Alingga are basically derived from two sources - the Draft History of Qing, which features a short biography of him, and various edicts issued by the Yongzheng Emperor, who despised him. It is therefore difficult to ascertain what kind of life he truly led or his personal character, as the Yongzheng Emperor's opinions were likely affected by Alingga's allegiance to the emperor's political rivals.

== References and notes ==
- Draft History of the Qing, Chapter 287, Biographies, 74
