= Empress Xiaozhaoren =

Empress of China from 1677 to 1678

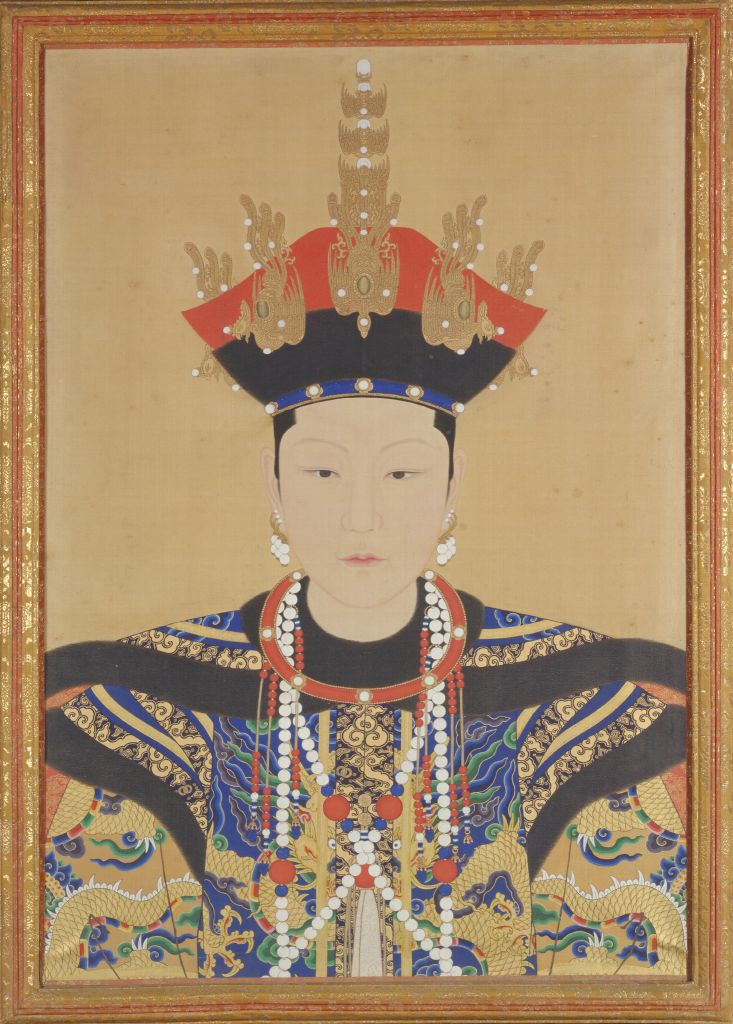
- A portrait of Empress Xiaozhaoren in court dress

Empress consort of the Qing dynasty
- Tenure: 18 September 1677 – 18 March 1678
- Predecessor: Empress Xiaochengren
- Successor: Empress Xiaoyiren
- Born: 1653 (順治十年)
- Died: 18 March 1678 (aged 24–25) (康熙十七年 二月 二十六日); Kunning Palace, Forbidden City, Beijing, Qing dynasty
- Burial: Jing Mausoleum, Eastern Qing tombs
- Spouse: Kangxi Emperor (m. 1665)
Posthumous name
- Empress Xiaozhao Jingshu Minghui Zhenghe Anyu Duanmu Qintian Shunsheng Ren (孝昭靜淑明惠正和安裕端穆欽天順聖仁皇后)
- House: Niohuru (鈕祜祿氏; by birth); Aisin Gioro (by marriage)
- Father: Ebilun
- Mother: Lady Šušu Gioro

Empress Xiaozhaoren

Chinese name
- Traditional Chinese: 孝昭仁皇后
- Simplified Chinese: 孝昭仁皇后
Transcriptions
Standard Mandarin
- Hanyu Pinyin: Xiàozhāorén Huánghòu

Manchu name
- Manchu script: ᡥᡳᠶᠣᠣᡧᡠᠩᡤᠠ ᡤᡝᠩᡤᡳᠶᡝᠨ ᡤᠣᠰᡳᠨ ᡥᡡᠸᠠᠩᡥᡝᠣ
- Romanization: hiyoošungga genggiyen gosin hūwangheo

Empress Xiaozhaoren (1653 – 18 March 1678), of the Manchu Bordered Yellow Banner Niohuru clan, was the second empress consort of the Kangxi Emperor of China's Qing dynasty from 1677 until her death in 1678.

Her father was the regent Ebilun, and she was originally an imperial concubine until her promotion to empress in 1677.

== Life ==
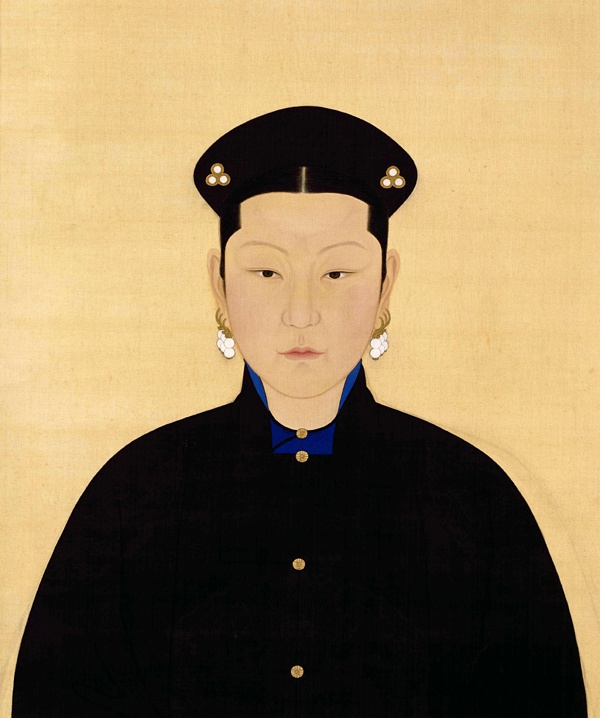
A portrait of Empress Xiaozhaoren in daily dress

Empress Xiaozhaoren's personal name was not recorded in history.

=== Family background ===
- Father: Ebilun (遏必隆; ? – 1673), served as one of the Four Regents of the Kangxi Emperor, and held the title of a first class duke (一等公)
  - Paternal grandfather: Eidu (額亦都; 1562–1621)
  - Paternal grandmother: Mukushen (穆庫什; 1595–1659), Nurhaci's fourth daughter
- Mother: Lady Šušu-Gioro (舒舒觉罗氏), a secondary wife
- Seven brothers
  - First elder brother: Sailin (塞林), third class imperial guard (三等侍卫)
  - Second elder brother: unnamed
  - Third younger brother: Faka (法喀; 17 May 1664 – 9 February 1713), first class duke (一等公)
  - Fourth younger brother: Yanzhu (颜珠; 1665 – ?), first class imperial guard (一等侍卫)
  - Fifth younger brother: Fubao (富保; 1678 – ?), second class imperial guard (任二等侍卫)
  - Sixth younger brother: Yinde (尹德), first class duke ( 一等公)
  - Seventh younger brother: Alingga (阿靈阿; 1670–1716)
- Five sisters
  - First elder sister: Princess Consort, wife of Zhashen (扎什) of the Mongol Barin clan (巴林氏)
  - Third younger sister: Noble Consort Wenxi (? – 1694)
  - Fourth younger sister: Duchess of the Fourth Rank, wife of Yunsheng (云升) of the Aisin-Gioro clan (愛新覺羅氏)
  - Fifth younger sister: First Class Viscountess, wife of Ayushen (阿玉什)
  - Sixth younger sister: Mistress of Kangxi (咯咯), mother of 20th daughter

=== Kangxi era ===
In 1665, Lady Niohuru entered the Forbidden City and became a mistress (格格) of the Kangxi Emperor. She did not receive any rank or title initially. After the Kangxi Emperor's first wife, Empress Xiaochengren, died on 6 June 1674, the Emperor did not elevate any of his imperial consorts to the position of empress to replace her. On 18 September 1677, Lady Niohuru was first mentioned in official histories when the Kangxi Emperor instated her as the new empress. She died on 18 March 1678 and was interred in the Jing Mausoleum of the Eastern Qing tombs alongside Empress Xiaochengren.

== Titles ==
- During the reign of the Shunzhi Emperor (r. 1643–1661):
  - Lady Niohuru (鈕祜祿氏)
- During the reign of the Kangxi Emperor (r. 1661–1722):
  - Mistress (格格; from 1665)
  - Empress (皇后; from 18 September 1677)
  - Empress Xiaozhao (孝昭皇后; from 11 May 1678)
- During the reign of the Yongzheng Emperor (r. 1722–1735):
  - Empress Xiaozhaoren (孝昭仁皇后; from July 1723)

== See also ==
- Imperial Chinese harem system#Qing
- Royal and noble ranks of the Qing dynasty

== Notes ==
Empress Xiaozhaoren House of Niohuru
Chinese royalty
| Preceded by Empress Xiaochengren of the Hešeri clan | Empress consort of China; 18 September 1677 – 18 March 1678 | Succeeded by Empress Xiaoyiren of the Tunggiya clan |
