= Jiaqing Emperor =

Emperor of China from 1796 to 1820

Jiaqing Emperor 嘉慶帝
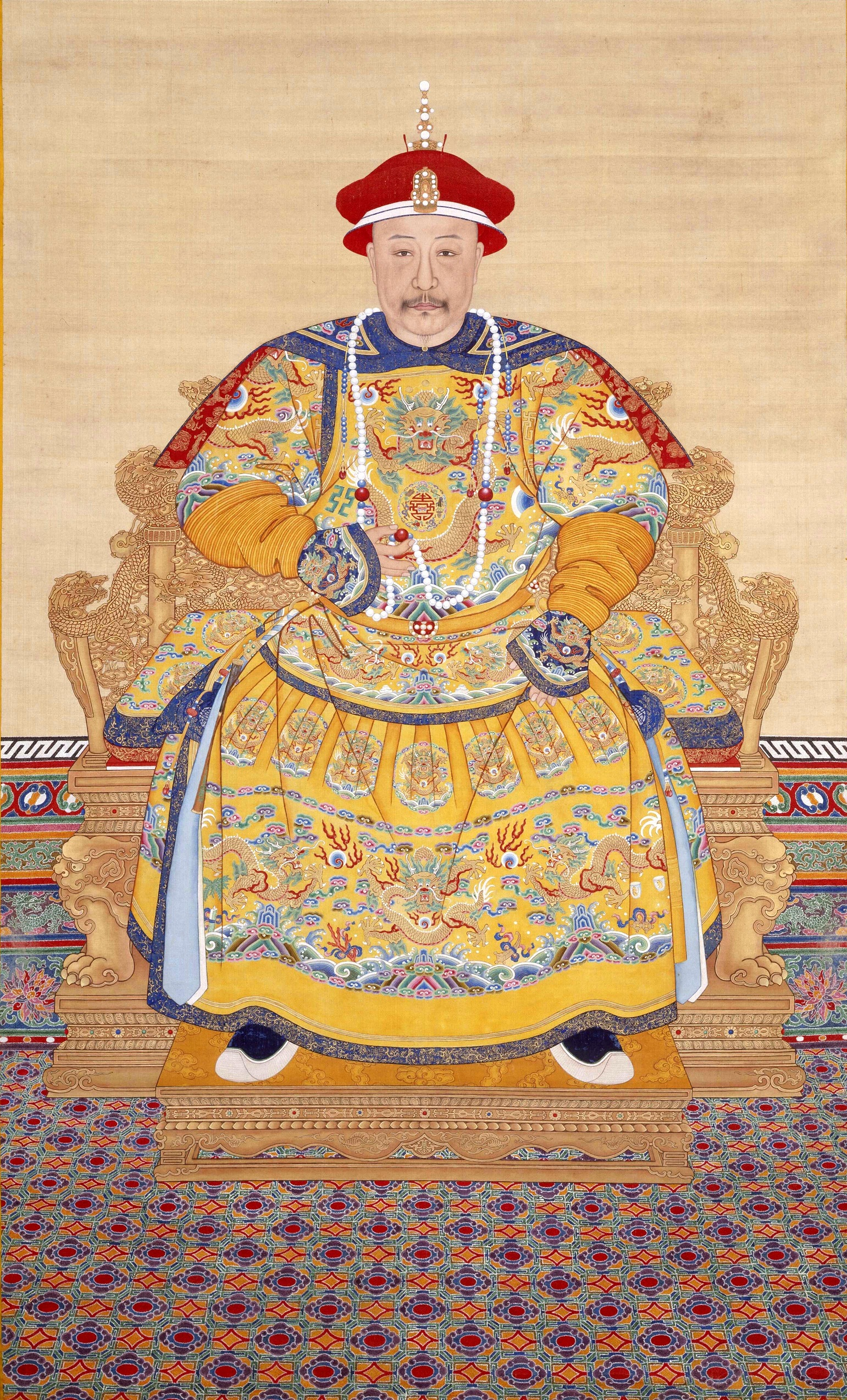
- Portrait of the Jiaqing Emperor in court dress, by anonymous painter, late 18th or early 19th century

Emperor of the Qing dynasty
- Reign: 9 February 1796 – 2 September 1820 (24 years, 206 days)
- Predecessor: Qianlong Emperor
- Successor: Daoguang Emperor
- Regent: Qianlong Emperor (1796–1799)

Prince Jia of the First Rank
- Tenure: 16 November 1789 – 9 February 1796 (6 years, 85 days)
- Born: 13 November 1760; Imperial Gardens (in present-day Beijing)
- Died: 2 September 1820 (aged 59); Mountain Estate (in present-day Chengde)
- Burial: Chang Mausoleum, Western Qing tombs
- Consorts: Empress Xiaoshurui (m. 1774; died 1797) Empress Xiaoherui (m. 1790)
- Issue Detail: Daoguang Emperor; Miankai, Prince Dunke of the First Rank; Mianxin, Prince Ruihuai of the First Rank; Mianyu, Prince Huiduan of the First Rank
Names
- Yongyan (顒琰); Manchu: Yong yan (ᠶᠣᠩ ᠶᠠᠨ)
Era dates
- Jiaqing (嘉慶): 9 February 1796 – 2 February 1821; Manchu: Saicungga fengšen (ᠰᠠᡳᠴᡠᠩᡤᠠ ᡶᡝᠩᡧᡝᠨ); Mongolian: Сайшаалт ерөөлт (ᠰᠠᠶᠢᠰᠢᠶᠠᠯᠲᠤ ᠢᠷᠦᠭᠡᠯᠲᠦ)
Posthumous name
- Emperor Shoutian Xingyun Fuhua Suiyou Chongwen Jingwu Guangyu Xiaogong Qinjian Duanmin Yingzhe Rui (受天興運敷化綏猷崇文經武光裕孝恭勤儉端敏英哲睿皇帝); Manchu: Abka be Aliha, Forgon be Yendebuhe, Wen be Selgiyehe, Doro be Toktobuha, Šu be Wesihulehe, Horon be Algimbuha, Hiyoošungga Gungnecuke, Kicebe Boljonggo, Tob Ulhisu Dacun Sultungga, Sunggiyen Hūwangdi (ᠠᠪᡴᠠ ᠪᡝ ᠠᠯᡳᡥᠠ᠈ ᡶᠣᡵᡤᠣᠨ ᠪᡝ ᠶᡝᠨᡩᡝᠪᡠᡥᡝ᠈ ᠸᡝᠨ ᠪᡝ ᠰᡝᠯᡤᡳᠶᡝᡥᡝ᠈ ᡩᠣᡵᠣ ᠪᡝ ᡨᠣᡴᡨᠣᠪᡠᡥᠠ᠈ ᡧᡠ ᠪᡝ ᠸᡝᠰᡳᡥᡠᠯᡝᡥᡝ᠈ ᡥᠣᡨᠣᠨ ᠪᡝ ᠠᠯᡤᡳᠮᠪᡠᡥᠠ᠈ ᡥᡳᠶᠣᠣᡧᡠᠩᡤᠠ ᡤᡠᠩᠨᡝᠴᡠᡴᡝ᠈ ᡴᡳᠴᡝᠪᡝ ᠪᠣᠯᠵᠣᠩᡤᠣ᠈ ᡨᠣᠪ ᡠᠯᡥᡳᠰᡠ ᡩᠠᠴᡠᠨ ᠰᡠᠯᡨᡠᠩᡤᠠ᠈ ᠰᡠᠩᡤᡳᠶᡝᠨ ᡥᡡᠸᠠᠩᡩᡳ)
Temple name
- Renzong (仁宗); Manchu: Žindzung (ᡰᡳᠨᡯᡠᠩ)
- House: Aisin-Gioro
- Dynasty: Qing
- Father: Qianlong Emperor
- Mother: Empress Xiaoyichun
- Seal (Note: Chenhan (宸翰, Chénhàn) seal used for calligraphy and handwritten works.)

Chinese name
- Traditional Chinese: 嘉慶帝
- Simplified Chinese: 嘉庆帝
Transcriptions
Standard Mandarin
- Hanyu Pinyin: Jiāqìng Dì
- Wade–Giles: Chia^{1}-ch'ing^{4} Ti^{4}
- IPA: [tɕjátɕʰîŋ tî]

The Jiaqing Emperor (13 November 1760 – 2 September 1820), also known by his temple name Emperor Renzong of Qing, personal name Yongyan, was the sixth emperor of the Qing dynasty and the fifth Qing emperor to rule over China proper. He was the 15th son of the Qianlong Emperor. During his reign, he prosecuted Heshen, the corrupt favorite of his father, and attempted to restore order within the empire while curbing the smuggling of opium into China. Assessments of his reign are mixed, either seen as the "beginning of the end" of the Qing dynasty, or as a period of moderate reform that presaged the intellectual movements of the 1860s.

== Early years ==
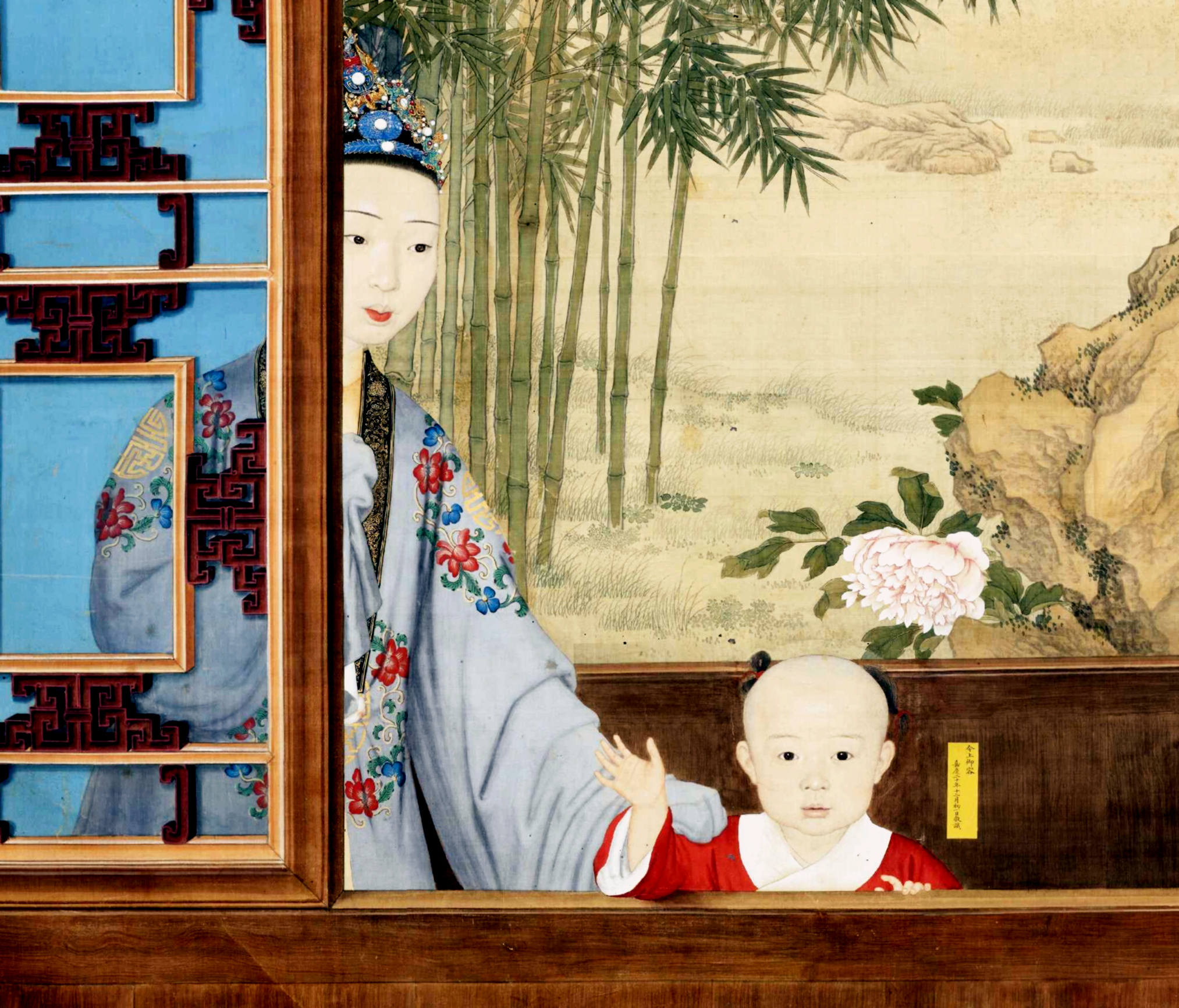
Jiaqing as a child with Empress Xiaoyichun

Yongyan was born in the Old Summer Palace, 8 km (5 mi) northwest of the walls of Beijing. His personal name, "Yongyan" (永琰), was later changed to "Yongyan" (顒琰) when he became the emperor. The Chinese character for yong in his name was changed from the more common 永 to the less common 顒. This novelty was introduced by the Qianlong Emperor, who believed that it was not proper to have a commonly used Chinese character in an emperor's personal name due to the longstanding practice of naming taboo in the imperial family since the time of ancient China.

Yongyan was the 15th son of the Qianlong Emperor. His mother was Noble Consort Ling, the daughter of Wei Qingtai (魏清泰), an ethnic Han Chinese official whose family had been long integrated into the Manchu Eight Banners as part of a Han Banner.

The Qianlong Emperor originally had two other sons in mind for succeeding him, but both of them died early from diseases, hence in December 1773 he secretly chose Yongyan as his successor. On 16 November 1789, the Qianlong Emperor instated Yongyan as "Prince Jia of the First Rank" (嘉親王; or simply "Prince Jia").

== Accession to the throne ==
In October 1795, the 60th year of his reign, the Qianlong Emperor announced his intention to abdicate in favour of Prince Jia. He made this decision because he felt that it was disrespectful for him to rule longer than his grandfather, the Kangxi Emperor, who was on the throne for 61 years. Prince Jia ascended the throne and adopted the era name "Jiaqing" in February 1796, hence he is historically known as the Jiaqing Emperor. For the next three years, however, the Jiaqing Emperor was emperor in name and rite only because decisions were still made by his father, who became a Taishang Huang (emperor emeritus) after his abdication.

After the death of the Qianlong Emperor in the beginning of February 1799, the Jiaqing Emperor took control of the government and prosecuted Heshen, a favourite official of his father. Heshen was charged with corruption and abuse of power, stripped of his titles, had his property confiscated, and ordered to commit suicide. Heshen's daughter-in-law, Princess Hexiao, a half-sister of the Jiaqing Emperor, was spared from punishment and given a few properties from Heshen's estates. The Jiaqing Emperor commuted the death sentence of the scholar Hong Liangji who had criticised the policies of the Qianlong Emperor and Heshen, instead exiling him to a remote part of northern China and pardoning him altogether in 1800.

Heshen was described as the 'primary evil' effecting the Empire, and after his removal the Emperor pursued a series of reforms of the court, civil service and treasury. He was a traditionalist in terms of his role as an ethnic Manchu leader, taking parts in imperial hunts, inspection tours, and upholding strict court protocol. As part of this traditionalist approach, the Jiaqing Emperor promoted ministers on the basis of their commitment to a 'purist' approach to Confucian rule.

The impact of the Jiaqing Emperor's reforms are questionable, with the Emperor described by Jonathan Spence as having 'relied on rhetoric more than specific policies to cleanse his empire', with Heshen's clique soon replaced by other bureaucratic factions.

At the time, the Qing Empire faced internal disorder, most importantly the large-scale White Lotus (1796–1804) and Miao (1795–1806) rebellions, as well as an empty imperial treasury. The Jiaqing Emperor engaged in the pacification of the empire and the quelling of rebellions, although this came at a steep fiscal cost. He endeavored to bring China back to its 18th-century prosperity and power.

In 1813, the Jiaqing Emperor also faced the threat of the Eight Trigrams uprising, led by a millenarian Buddhist sect that launched a failed attack on the Forbidden City, with the intention of assassinating the Emperor upon his return from a hunting trip. The Jiaqing Emperor was intrigued by the leader of the rising, Lin Qing, and summoned him to a private interrogation. Lin was later executed by slicing.

=== Foreign relations ===
In 1816, William Amherst, 1st Earl Amherst was sent as ambassador extraordinary to the court, intending to establish more satisfactory commercial relations between China and Great Britain. The Amherst Embassy proved a failure as a result of Amherst's refusal to perform a kowtow to the Emperor, but would prove to have a significant impact on British views of China and the Qing dynasty.

The Jiaqing Emperor refused the Vietnamese ruler Gia Long's request to change his country's name to Nam Việt, but agreed that it could be changed to Việt Nam instead. Gia Long's Đại Nam thực lục contains the diplomatic correspondence over the naming.

=== Opposition to Christianity ===
The Great Qing Legal Code includes one statute titled "Prohibitions Concerning Sorcerers and Sorceresses" (禁止師巫邪術). In 1811, a clause was added to it with reference to Christianity. It was modified in 1815 and 1817, settled in its final form in 1839 under the Daoguang Emperor, and repealed in 1870 under the Tongzhi Emperor. It sentenced Europeans to death for spreading "the religion of the Lord of Heaven" among Han Chinese and Manchus. While "the Lord of Heaven" (天主, Tiānzhǔ) was primarily used as a translation of the name of the Christian God by Catholic missionaries and this could be taken to imply that the statute was primarily directed against Catholicism, it became clear in the 1830s that the Qing government considered the ban to apply to other forms of Christianity as well. Christians who would not repent their conversion were sent to Muslim cities in Xinjiang, to be given as slaves to Muslim leaders and beys.

=== Chinese nobility ===
The Jiaqing Emperor granted the title Wujing Boshi (五經博士; Wǔjīng Bóshì) to the descendants of Tang essayist Han Yu.

== Personal life and interests ==
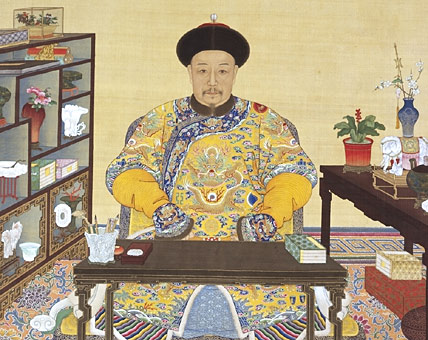
Emperor Jiaqing in court dress

The Jiaqing Emperor commissioned printed compendia of courtly collections, which are an important source for our present understanding of Qing court art. He was a keen scholar of the Confucian classics (to which he devoted much of his time in the early years of his reign when the Qianlong Emperor remained de facto ruler), with 15,267 poems attributed to him.

== Death and burial ==
On 2 September 1820, the Jiaqing Emperor died at the Rehe (Jehol) Traveling Palace (熱河行宫), 230 km (140 mi) northeast of Beijing, where the imperial court was in summer quarters. The Draft History of Qing did not record a cause of death. Some have alleged that he died after being struck by lightning, but others prefer the theory that he died of a stroke, as the emperor was quite obese. He was succeeded by his second son, Mianning, who became known as the Daoguang Emperor.

The Jiaqing Emperor was interred amidst the Western Qing Tombs, 120 km (75 mi) southwest of Beijing, in the Chang (昌; lit. "splendid") mausoleum complex.

== Legacy ==
In Taiwan, a popular though apocryphal legend claims that Prince Jia, or Lord Jiaqing, travelled to Taiwan and went on a number of adventures there shortly before ascending to the throne. It has been adapted numerous times into literature, Taiwanese opera, films and television.

== Family ==
- Empress Xiaoshurui (孝淑睿皇后), of the Hitara clan (喜塔臘氏; 2 October 1760 – 5 March 1797)
  - Second daughter (2 June 1780 – 6 September 1783)
  - Minning (旻寧), the Daoguang Emperor (道光帝; 16 September 1782 – 26 February 1850), second son
  - Princess Zhuangjing of the First Rank (莊靜固倫公主; 20 October 1784 – 27 June 1811), fourth daughter
    - Married Manibadala (瑪尼巴達喇; d. 1832), of the Tumed Borjigin clan, in November/December 1802
  - Miscarriage at three months (18 August 1785)
- Empress Xiaoherui (孝和睿皇后), of the Niohuru clan (鈕祜祿氏; 20 November 1776 – 23 January 1850)
  - Seventh daughter (2 August 1793 – 16 July 1795)
  - Miankai (綿愷), Prince Dunke of the First Rank (惇恪親王; 6 August 1795 – 18 January 1838), third son
  - Mianxin (綿忻), Prince Ruihuai of the First Rank (瑞懷親王; 9 March 1805 – 27 September 1828), fourth son
- Imperial Noble Consort Heyu (和裕皇貴妃), of the Liugiya clan (劉佳氏; 9 January 1761 – 27 April 1834)
  - Prince Mu of the Second Rank (穆郡王; 4 February 1780 – 10 June 1780), first son
  - Princess Zhuangjing of the Second Rank (莊敬和碩公主; 30 January 1782 – 4 April 1811), third daughter
    - Married Sodnamdorji (索特納木多布濟; d. 1825), of the Khorchin Borjigin clan, on 24 December 1801, and had issue (one daughter)
- Imperial Noble Consort Gongshun (恭順皇貴妃), of the Niohuru clan (鈕祜祿氏; 28 May 1787 – 23 April 1860)
  - Eighth daughter (8 March 1805 – 14 January 1806)
  - Princess Huimin of the First Rank (慧愍固倫公主; 18 February 1811 – 28 June 1815), ninth daughter
  - Mianyu (綿愉), Prince Huiduan of the First Rank (惠端親王; 8 March 1814 – 9 January 1865), fifth son
- Consort Shu (恕妃), of the Wanyan clan (完顏氏; d. 1792)
- Consort Hua (華妃), of the Hougiya clan (侯佳氏; d. 3 August 1808), personal name Liuniu (六妞)
  - Sixth daughter (2 August 1789 – June/July 1790)
- Consort Zhuang (莊妃), of the Wanyan clan (王佳氏; d. 9 March 1811)
- Consort Xin (信妃), of the Liugiya clan (劉佳氏; 26 April 1783 – 26 November 1822)
- Concubine Jian (簡嬪), of the Gūwalgiya clan (關佳氏; d. 14 May 1780)
  - First daughter (14 May 1780 – 24 November 1783)
- Concubine Xun (遜嬪), of the Shen clan (沈氏; d. 31 December 1786)
  - Princess Hui'an of the Second Rank (慧安和碩公主; 31 December 1786 – June/July 1795), fifth daughter
- Concubine Chun (淳嬪), of the Donggiya clan (董佳氏; d. 30 November 1819)
- Concubine En (恩嬪), of the Uya clan (烏雅氏)
- Concubine Rong (榮嬪), of the Liang clan (梁氏)
- Concubine An (安嬪), of the Gūwalgiya clan (瓜爾佳氏; 1 March 1785 – 29 July 1837)
- Noble Lady Yun (芸贵人), of a certain clan (某氏; d. 1805)
- Noble Lady Yu (玉贵人), of a certain clan (某氏)
- First Class Attendant Hui (慧常在), of a certain clan (某氏)

== See also ==
- Chinese emperors family tree (late)

== Notes ==
Jiaqing Emperor House of Aisin-Gioro Born: 13 November 1760 Died: 2 September 1820
Regnal titles
Preceded by The Qianlong Emperor	Emperor of China; 9 February 1796 – 2 September 1820	Succeeded by The Daoguang Emperor
