= Consorts of the Daoguang Emperor =

The Daoguang Emperor of the Qing dynasty of China had fifteen imperial consorts, including four empresses, one imperial noble consort, three noble consorts, three consorts, and four concubines.

== Empresses ==
1. Empress Xiaomucheng, of the Niohuru clan (1807 – 17 February 1808)
2. Empress Xiaoshencheng, of the Tunggiya clan (1820 – 16 June 1833)
3. Empress Xiaoquancheng, of the Niohuru clan (17 June 1833 – 13 February 1840)
4. Empress Xiaojingcheng, of the Khorchin Borjigin clan (14 February 1840 – 1850)

== Imperial Noble Consort ==
1. Imperial Noble Consort Zhuangshun

== Noble Consorts ==
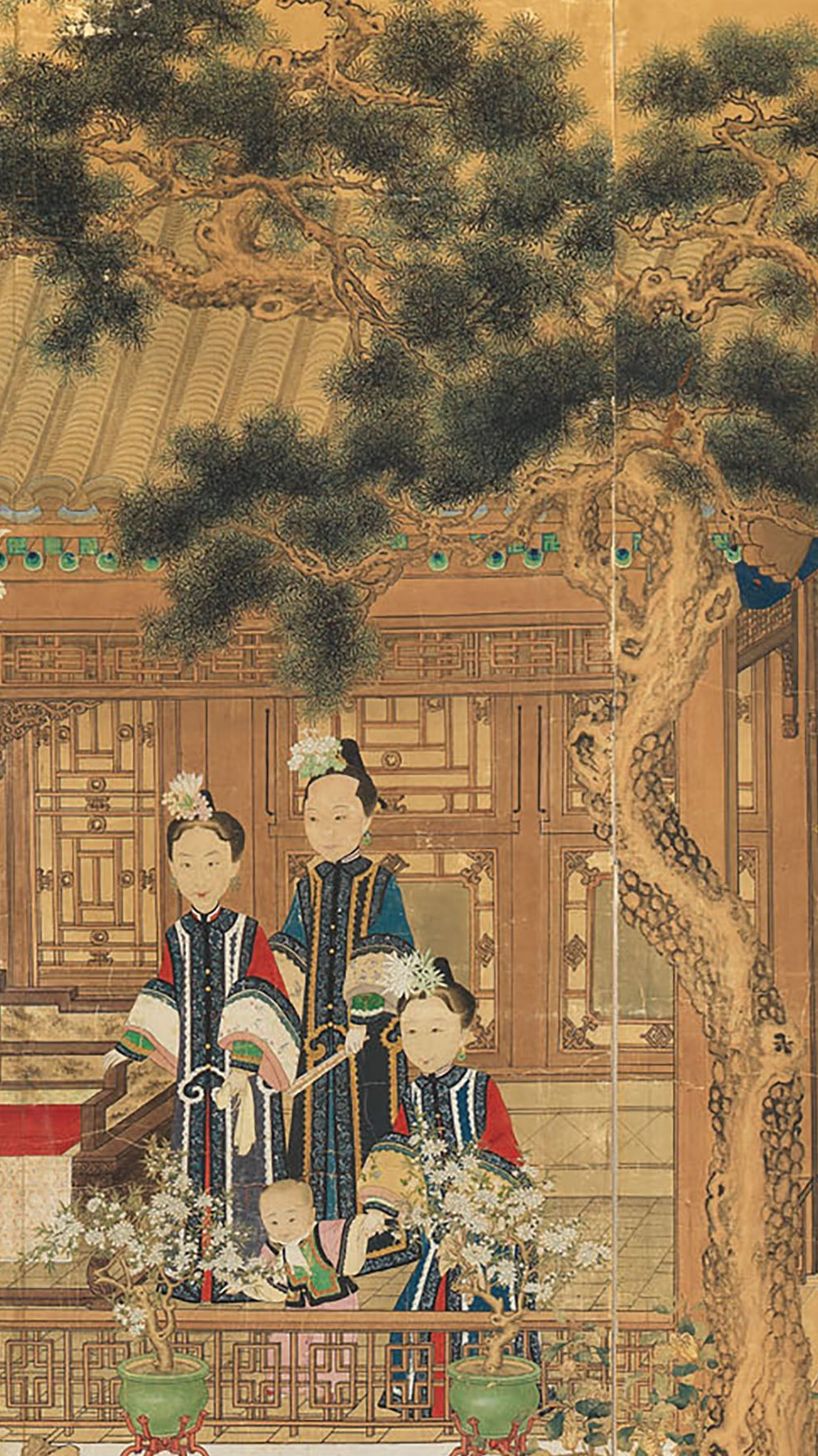
Consort Chang, Noble Consort Cheng and Consort Xiang

1. Noble Consort Tong, of the Šumuru clan
2. Noble Consort Jia, of the Gogiya clan
3. Noble Consort Cheng, of the Niohuru clan

== Consorts ==
1. Consort He, of the Hoifa-Nara clan
2. Consort Xiang, of the Niohuru clan
3. Consort Chang, of the Hešeri clan

== Concubines ==
=== 1. Concubine Tian ===
Concubine Tian was a member of the prominent Manchu Bordered Yellow Banner Fuca clan. Her personal name was not recorded in history.

Father: Chaqing'a (查清阿), served as a magistrate of Guangdong

- Grandfather: Mujing'an (穆靖安), served as fifth rank literary official (员外郎); Maci's grandson

Mother: Lady Aisin-Gioro

- Grandfather: Keling'a (科灵阿), served as second class body guard (二等侍卫)

One younger sister: wife of Gioro Chunpei, Master Commandant of Cavalry

Two younger brothers:

- First younger brother: Chengduan (诚端), served as a fourth rank literary official in the Ministry of Works (侍郎)
- Second younger brother: Chengchun (诚春), a secretary of the Inner Court (内阁中书)

==== Qianlong era ====
Concubine Tian was born on 15 April 1789.

==== Jiaqing era ====
Lady Fuca entered the residence of Prince Zhi of the First Rank in 1806 as a secondary consort (侧福晋). At that time, she didn't give birth to any child.

==== Daoguang era ====
In 1820, after the coronation of the Daoguang Emperor, Lady Fuca was granted a title "Concubine Tian" (恬嫔; "tian" meaning "peaceful" in Chinese, but ”composed" in Manchu). Concubine Tian initially resided in the Palace of Heavenly Grace. She moved to the Palace of Prolonging Happiness in 1825, which was under the jurisdiction of Consort Chang.

She was described as a benevolent and virtuous person and praised by palace staff. When her head palace maid fell ill, Concubine Tian sent her to recuperate. In 1843, she participated in banquet after a court session by Empress Dowager Gongci in the Palace of Compassion and Tranquility together with other imperial consorts. Every New Year's Day, she burned incenses in the back hall of the Palace of Gathering Elegance for Empress Xiaoshencheng. However, Lady Fuca never rose above the rank of concubine despite her earlier status of secondary consort. On 21 August 1845, when the Palace of Prolonging Happiness caught fire, Concubine Tian failed to escape from the raging flames and died at the age of 58. Her head eunuch was beaten 100 times and exiled to the Amur region. Her coffin was interred at Mu Mausoleum of the Western Qing tombs.

== Residences in the Forbidden City of the imperial consorts ==
Year	Imperial consort	Palace	Notes
1821–1833	Empress Xiaoshencheng	Palace of Gathering Elegance (储秀宫; Chǔxiù gōng)	
1845–1850	Concubine Yu	Palace of Gathering Elegance (储秀宫; Chǔxiù gōng)	
1821–1840	Empress Xiaoquancheng	Palace of Accumulated Purity (锺粹宫; Zhōngcuì gōng)	
1835–1836	Noble Consort Jia	Palace of Accumulated Purity (锺粹宫; Zhōngcuì gōng)	
1840–1850	Empress Xiaojingcheng	Palace of Accumulated Purity (锺粹宫; Zhōngcuì gōng)	
1821–1840	Empress Xiaojingcheng	Palace of Eternal Harmony (永和宫; Yǒnghé gōng)	
1821–1836	Consort He	Palace of Prolonging Happiness (延禧宫; Yánxǐ gōng)	
1825–1845	Concubine Tian	Palace of Prolonging Happiness (延禧宫; Yánxǐ gōng)	Palace of Prolonging Happiness burnt down in August 1845
1828–1845	Noble Consort Cheng	Palace of Prolonging Happiness (延禧宫; Yánxǐ gōng)	Palace of Prolonging Happiness burnt down in August 1845
1834–1845	Concubine Yu	Palace of Prolonging Happiness (延禧宫; Yánxǐ gōng)	Palace of Prolonging Happiness burnt down in August 1845
1822–1825	Consort Chang	Palace of Prolonging Happiness (延禧宫; Yánxǐ gōng)	She lived there under supervision and moved out to the Palace of Heavenly Grace
1825–1827	Consort Chang	Palace of Heavenly Grace (承乾宫; Chéngqián gōng)	
1836–1850	Noble Consort Jia	Palace of Heavenly Grace (承乾宫; Chéngqián gōng)	
1842–1850	Imperial Noble Consort Zhuangshun	Palace of Heavenly Grace (承乾宫; Chéngqián gōng)	
1827–1850	Consort Chang	Palace of Universal Happiness (咸福宫; Xíanfú gōng)	
1845–1850	Noble Consort Cheng	Palace of Universal Happiness (咸福宫; Xíanfú gōng)	
1831–1850	Noble Consort Tong	Palace of Universal Happiness (咸福宫; Xíanfú gōng)	
1837–1842	Imperial Noble Consort Zhuangshun	Palace of Universal Happiness (咸福宫; Xíanfú gōng)	
1821–1850	Consort Xiang	Palace of Earthly Honour (翊坤宫; Yìkūn gōng)	
