= Palace of Universal Happiness =

Residence of imperial consorts in the Forbidden City

Coordinates: 39°55′11″N 116°23′20″E

The Palace of Universal Happiness (simplified Chinese: 咸福宫; traditional Chinese: 咸福宮; pinyin: Xiánfúgōng), also known as Xianfu Palace, is one of the Six Western Palaces in the inner court of the Forbidden City. It is situated north of the Palace of Eternal Spring, east of the Palace of Gathering Elegance and northwest of the Palace of Earthly Honour.

== History ==
This residence was built in 1420 as the "Palace of Peaceful Longevity" (寿安宫; Shòu'āngōng) and received its current name in 1535, during the reign of the Jiajing Emperor. It underwent renovations in 1683 and in 1897.

In 1741, when court painters created a series of paintings depicting virtues of ancient imperial consorts, the palace was decorated with the painting "Feng Yuan fighting a bear", which symbolises courage.

Although it was mainly reserved for imperial consorts, several emperors lived here occasionally.

The back hall, Tongdao Hall (同道堂), became a storage of imperial seals for Empress Dowager Ci'an and Empress Dowager Cixi, who were acting as regents during the reigns of emperors Tongzhi and Guangxu.

The palace has a hip roof covered with yellow glazed tiles and a square layout, similar to the Palace of Great Brilliance on the eastern side of inner court.

== Residents ==
=== Ming dynasty ===
Year	Emperor	Imperial consort	Note
	Wanli	Grand Empress Dowager Xiaojing	

=== Qing dynasty ===
Year	Emperor	Imperial consort	Note
1735–1799	Qianlong		He lived here occasionally
1799	Jiaqing		He mourned his father here
1827–1850	Daoguang	Consort Chang	She was twice demoted and moved out from the Palace of Prolonging Happiness and the Palace of Heavenly Grace, her former residences
1831–1850	Daoguang	Noble Consort Tong	
1837–1842	Daoguang	Imperial Noble Consort Zhuangshun	She moved to the Palace of Heavenly Grace
1845–1850	Daoguang	Noble Consort Cheng	Her former residence, the Palace of Prolonging Happiness, burnt down
1850–1853	Daoguang	Empress Xiaojingcheng	She lived here before moving to the Palace of Longevity and Good Health
1850	Xianfeng		He mourned his father here

== See also ==
- Imperial Chinese harem system
- Forbidden City
