= Concubine Tian =

Concubine of the Daoguang Emperor (1789–1845)

- Born: 15 April 1789
- Died: 21 August 1845 (aged 56); Yanxi Palace, Forbidden City
- Burial: Mu Mausoleum, Western Qing tombs
- Spouse: Daoguang Emperor (m. 1806)
- Father: Chaqing'a (查清阿)

Concubine Tian
- Traditional Chinese: 恬嬪
- Simplified Chinese: 恬嫔
Transcriptions
Standard Mandarin
- Hanyu Pinyin: Tián Pín

Concubine Tian (simplified Chinese: 恬嫔; traditional Chinese: 恬嬪; pinyin: Tián Pín; 15 April 1789 – 21 August 1845), of the Manchu Bordered Yellow Banner Fuca clan, was a consort of the Daoguang Emperor.

== Life ==
=== Family background ===
Concubine Tian was a member of the prominent Manchu Bordered Yellow Banner Fuca clan. Her personal name was not recorded in history.

Father: Chaqing'a (查清阿), served as a magistrate of Guangdong

- Paternal grandfather: Mujing'an (穆靖安), served as fifth rank literary official (员外郎), Maci's grandson

Mother: Lady Aisin-Gioro

- Maternal grandfather: Keling'a (科灵阿), served as second class body guard (二等侍卫)

One younger sister: primary wife of Gioro Chunpei, Master Commandant of Cavalry

Two younger brothers:

- First younger brother: Chengduan (诚端), served as a fourth rank literary official in the Ministry of Works (侍郎)
- Second younger brother: Chengchun (诚春), a secretary of Inner Court (内阁中书)

==== Qianlong era ====
Concubine Tian was born on 15 April 1789.

==== Jiaqing era ====
Lady Fuca entered the residence of Prince Zhi of the First Rank in 1806 as a secondary consort (侧福晋).

==== Daoguang era ====
In 1820, after the coronation of the Daoguang Emperor, lady Fuca was granted a title "Concubine Tian" (恬嫔; "tian" meaning "peaceful" in Chinese, but ”composed" in Manchu). Concubine Tian initially resided in Chengqian Palace. She moved to Yanxi palace in 1825 which was under the jurisdiction of Consort Zhen.

She was described as a benevolent and virtuous person and praised by palace staff. When her head palace maid fell ill, concubine Tian sent her to recuperate. In 1843, she participated in banquet after a court session by Empress Dowager Gongci in Cining palace together with another imperial consorts. Every New Year's Day, she burned incenses in the back hall of Chuxiu palace for Empress Xiaoshencheng. However, lady Fuca never rose above the rank of concubine despite her earlier status of secondary consort. On 21 August 1845, when Yanxi palace was set on fire, Concubine Tian failed to escape from raging flame and died at the age of 58. Her head eunuch was beaten 100 times and exiled into Amur region. Her coffin was interred at Mu Mausoleum of the Western Qing tombs.

== Titles ==
- During the reign of the Qianlong Emperor (r. 1735–1796)
  - Lady Fuca (from 15 April 1789)
- During the reign of the Jiaqing Emperor (r. 1796–1820):
  - Secondary Consort (侧福晋; from 1806)
- During the reign of the Daoguang Emperor (r. 1820–1850):
  - Concubine Tian (恬嫔; from 1820), fifth rank consort

== See also ==
- Ranks of imperial consorts in China#Qing
- Royal and noble ranks of the Qing dynasty
