= Concubine Yu (Daoguang) =

Concubine of the Daoguang Emperor (1816–1897)

- Born: 20 December 1816
- Died: 24 September 1897; Forbidden City
- Burial: Mu Mausoleum, Western Qing tombs
- Spouse: Daoguang Emperor (m. 1834; died 1850)
- House: Shang (尚; by birth); Aisin Gioro (by marriage)
- Father: Ruqing (如慶)

Concubine Yu
- Traditional Chinese: 豫嬪
- Simplified Chinese: 豫嫔
Transcriptions
Standard Mandarin
- Hanyu Pinyin: Yù Pín

Concubine Yu (simplified Chinese: 豫嫔; traditional Chinese: 豫嬪; pinyin: Yù Pín; 20 December 1816 – 24 September 1897), of the Han Chinese Plain White Banner Shang clan, was a consort of Daoguang Emperor.

== Life ==
=== Family background ===
Concubine Yu was a member of Han Chinese Plain White Banner Shang clan.

- Father: Ruqing (如慶)
  - Paternal grandfather: Fuhai (福海)
  - Paternal grandmother: Lady Uya, a grand niece of Empress Xiaogongren
- One younger brother: Yingqi (英启)

==== Jiaqing era ====
The future Concubine Yu was born on 20 December 1816.

==== Daoguang era ====
Lady Shang entered the Forbidden City in 1834, and was given the title of "First Class Female Attendant Ling" (玲常在). She lived in Yanxi palace together with Noble Consort Cheng and Concubine Tian. In 1839, her palace maid Daniu was beaten forty times for stealing white silk satin. The palace maid also received a corporal punishment from her mistress for killing her cat. Later, Daniu was punished for stepping into a plate in 1840. That same year, lady Shang was demoted to "Second Class Female Attendant Shang" (尚答应). On 21 August 1845, the Palace of Prolonging Happiness burnt down, causing her to move out to Chuxiu palace.

==== Xianfeng era ====
In 1850, Lady Shang was restored as "First Class Female Attendant Shang" (尚常在). In 1860, she was rewarded during the celebration of Chinese New Year together with dowager concubines. Unlike Imperial Noble Consort Zhuangshun, Noble Consort Cheng, Noble Consort Jia, Consort Xiang, and First Attendant Cai, she was left in the Forbidden City.

==== Tongzhi era ====
In 1861, Lady Shang was promoted to "Noble Lady Shang" (尚貴人).

==== Guangxu era ====
In 1874, Lady Shang was promoted to "Concubine Yu" (豫嫔; "yu" meaning “comfortable"). Concubine Yu died on 24 September 1897 at the age of eighty-one. She was longest living consort of the Daoguang Emperor. Her coffin was interred at Mu Mausoleum of the Western Qing tombs.

== Titles ==
- During the reign of the Jiaqing Emperor (r. 1796–1820):
  - Lady Shang (from 20 December 1816)
- During the reign of the Daoguang Emperor (r. 1820–1850):
  - First Class Female Attendant Ling (玲常在; from 1834), seventh rank consort
  - Second Class Female Attendant Shang (尚答应; from 1840), eighth rank consort
- During the reign of the Xianfeng Emperor (r. 1850–1861):
  - First Class Female Attendant Shang (尚常在; from 1850), seventh rank consort
- During the reign of the Tongzhi Emperor (r. 1861–1875):
  - Noble Lady Shang (尚貴人; from 1861), sixth rank consort
- During the reign of the Guangxu Emperor (r. 1875–1908):
  - Concubine Yu (豫嫔; from 1874), fifth rank consort

== See also ==
- Ranks of imperial consorts in China#Qing
- Royal and noble ranks of the Qing dynasty
