= Consort Xin (Jiaqing) =

Concubine of Chinese Emperor

- Born: 26 April 1783
- Died: 26 November 1822 (aged 39); Forbidden City
- Burial: Chang Mausoleum, Western Qing tombs
- Spouse: Jiaqing Emperor (before 1820)
- House: Liugiya (by birth); Aisin Gioro (by marriage)
- Father: Benzhi (本智)

Consort Xin (Chinese: 信妃; pinyin: Xìn Fēi; 26 April 1783 – 26 November 1822), of the Manchu Bordered White Banner Liugiya clan, was a consort of Jiaqing Emperor.

== Life ==
=== Family background ===
Consort Xin was a member of Manchu Bordered White Banner Liugiya clan. Her personal name wasn't recorded in history.

Father: Benzhi, served as General of Jiangning, commander of Eight Banners in Jiangnan.

- Paternal grandfather: Baozhu, held a title of third class master commandant of light chariot.

One brother: Chenghui, served as literary official .

=== Qianlong era ===
Lady Liugiya was born on 26 April 1783.

=== Jiaqing era ===
She entered Forbidden city after the triennial Elegant Women Selection in April 1798. Upon the entry, she was given a title "Noble Lady Xin". A poem "Swangoose sees through needs" written by the secretary of Inner Court Jilun also mentions Noble Lady Xin. According to the poem, "xin" means "faithful". In 1808, Noble Lady Xin was promoted to "Concubine Xin" (信嫔). Her residence in the Forbidden City was Yanxi Palace. Concubine Xin remained childless during Jiaqing era.

=== Daoguang era ===
According to the imperial tradition, Concubine Xin was promoted to "Dowager Consort Xin" (信太妃) by Daoguang Emperor in January 1821. Lady Liugiya died on 26 November 1822. She was interred in the Chang Mausoleum in Western Qing tombs.

== Titles ==
- During the reign of the Qianlong Emperor (r. 1735–1796):
  - Lady Liugiya (from 26 April 1783)
- During the reign of the Jiaqing Emperor (r. 1796–1820):
  - Noble Lady Xin (信贵人; from April 1798), sixth rank consort
  - Concubine Xin (信嫔; from 1808), fifth rank consort
- During the reign of the Daoguang Emperor (r. 1820–1850):
  - Dowager Consort Xin (信太妃; from January 1821)

== In fiction and popular culture ==
- Portrayed by Elena Kong in Curse of the Royal Harem as Dowager Consort Xin, Liujia Fuxin (劉佳馥馨)

== See also ==
- Ranks of imperial consorts in China § Qing
- Royal and noble ranks of the Qing dynasty
