= Empress Xiaomucheng =

Consort of the Daoguang Emperor (1781–1808)

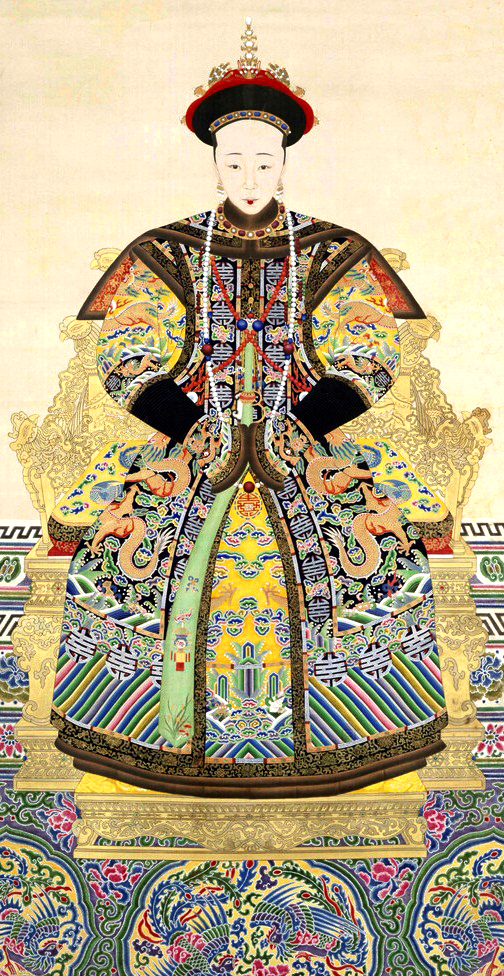
- Qing Dynasty portrait of Empress Xiaomucheng
- Born: 1781 (乾隆四十六年)
- Died: 17 May 1808 (aged 26–27) (嘉慶十三年 正月 二十一日)
- Burial: Mu Mausoleum, Western Qing tombs
- Spouse: Daoguang Emperor (m. 1796)
Posthumous name
- Empress Xiaomu Wenhou Zhuangsu Duancheng Kehui Kuanqin Futian Yusheng Cheng (孝穆溫厚莊肅端誠恪惠寬欽孚天裕聖成皇后)
- House: Niohuru (鈕祜祿; by birth); Aisin Gioro (by marriage)
- Father: Buyandalai

Empress Xiaomucheng

Chinese name
- Traditional Chinese: 孝穆成皇后
- Simplified Chinese: 孝穆成皇后
Transcriptions
Standard Mandarin
- Hanyu Pinyin: Xiàomùchéng Huánghòu

Manchu name
- Manchu script: ᡥᡳᠶᠣᠣᡧᡠᠩᡤᠠ ᠴᡳᠪᠰᡠᠩᡤᠣ ᡧᠠᠩᡤᠠᠨ ᡥᡡᠸᠠᠩᡥᡝᠣ
- Romanization: hiyoošungga cibsunggo šanggan hūwangheo

Empress Xiaomucheng (1781 – 17 February 1808), of the Manchu Bordered Yellow Banner Niohuru clan, was a consort of the Daoguang Emperor.

== Life ==
=== Family background ===
Empress Xiaomucheng's personal name was not recorded in history.

- Father: Buyandalai (布彥達賚/布彦达赉; d. 1801), served as the Minister of Revenue from 1799–1801, and held the title of a third class duke (三等公)
  - Paternal grandfather: Arigūn (阿里袞; d. 1769), Ebilun's grandson
  - Paternal great uncle: Necin (訥親; d. 1749), served as Minister of War until 1749
  - Paternal uncle: Fengšengge (豐昇額, d.1777), served as the Minister of War in 1770 and Minister of Revenue in 1773

=== Jiaqing era ===
On 22 December 1796, Lady Niohuru married Minning, the second son of the Jiaqing Emperor, and became his primary consort. She died on 17 February 1808 and was interred in the Eastern Qing tombs.

=== Daoguang era ===
The Jiaqing Emperor died on 2 September 1820 and was succeeded by Minning, who was enthroned as the Daoguang Emperor. Lady Niohuru was granted the posthumous title "Empress Xiaomu".

In 1828, there was a leak in the Eastern Qing tombs, resulting in flooding. In 1829, Lady Niohuru's casket was temporarily moved to the Baohua Ravine Hall (寶華峪正殿). In 1835, her casket was transferred to the Mu Mausoleum of the Western Qing tombs.

== Titles ==
- During the reign of the Qianlong Emperor (r. 1735–1796):
  - Lady Niohuru (from 1781)
- During the reign of the Jiaqing Emperor (r. 1796–1820):
  - Primary consort (嫡福晉; from 22 December 1796)
- During the reign of the Daoguang Emperor (r. 1820–1850):
  - Empress Xiaomu (孝穆皇后; from 1820)
- During the reign of the Xianfeng Emperor (r. 1850–1861):
  - Empress Xiaomucheng (孝穆成皇后; from 26 October 1850)

== See also ==
- Ranks of imperial consorts in China#Qing
- Royal and noble ranks of the Qing dynasty

== Notes ==
Empress Xiaomucheng House of Aisin-Gioro Died: 1808
Chinese royalty
| Preceded by Empress Xiaoherui | Empress of China title granted posthumously | Succeeded by Empress Xiaoshencheng |
