= Noble Consort Tong =

Consort of the Daoguang Emperor (1817–1877)

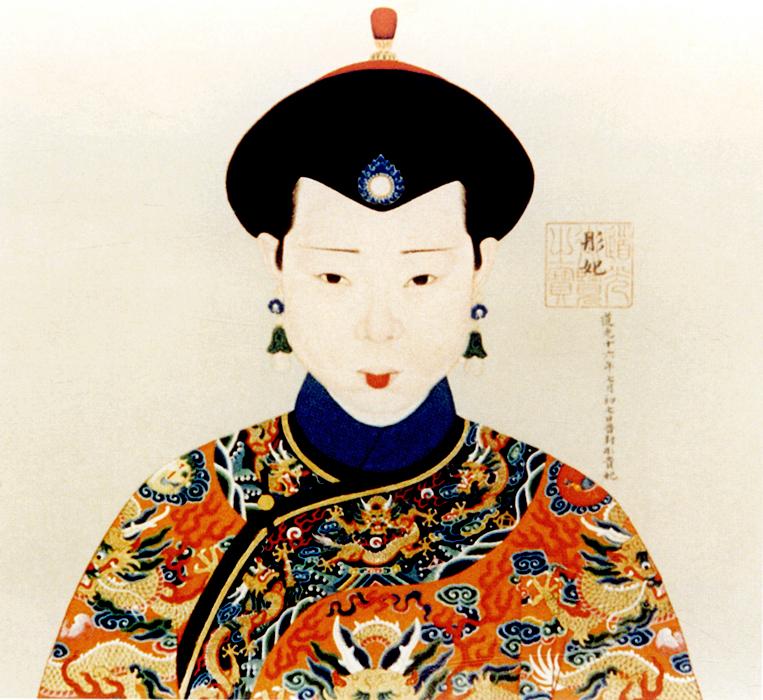
- Qing Dynasty portrait of Noble Consort Tong
- Born: 3 June 1817 (嘉慶二十二年 四月 十九日)
- Died: 1877 (aged 59–60) (光緒三年); Forbidden City
- Burial: Mu Mausoleum, Western Qing tombs
- Spouse: Daoguang Emperor (m. 1831; died 1850)
- Issue: Seventh daughter Princess Shouxi of the Second Rank; Tenth daughter
- House: Šumuru (舒穆祿; by birth); Aisin Gioro (by marriage)

Noble Consort Tong
- Traditional Chinese: 彤貴妃
- Simplified Chinese: 彤贵妃
Transcriptions
Standard Mandarin
- Hanyu Pinyin: Tóng Guìfēi

Noble Consort Tong (3 June 1817 – 1877), of the Manchu Šumuru clan, was a consort of the Daoguang Emperor. She was 35 years his junior.

== Life ==
Very little is known about Lady Šumuru's life before she entered the Forbidden City.

=== Family background ===
Noble Consort Tong's personal name was not recorded in history.

- Father: Yuzhang (玉彰), served as fifth rank literary official (郎中)
- One sister: Wife of Fuca Heshun (和顺), a first class imperial guard

=== Jiaqing Era ===
Lady Šumuru was born on the 3rd day of the fourth lunar month in the twenty-first year of the reign of the Jiaqing Emperor, which translates to 3 June 1817 in the Gregorian calendar.

=== Daoguang Era ===
Lady Šumuru entered the palace somewhere in 1831, at the age of fourteen or fifteen. She was given an honorary name along with her rank, "Noble Lady Mu" (睦貴人). Her residence became Xianfu palace on the west side of Forbidden City. In December 1832 or January 1833 Lady Šumuru was promoted to "Concubine Tong" (彤嬪). On 3 December 1834, she was promoted to "Consort Tong" (彤妃). On 26 January 1837, Lady Šumuru was given the prestigious promotion to "Noble Consort Tong" (彤貴妃), now twenty or twenty one, and having been in the palace for just six years. On 30 July 1840, Noble Consort Tong gave birth to the seventh princess, who would die prematurely on 27 January 1845. On 7 January 1842, she gave birth to the eighth princess, Princess Shouxi of the Second Rank. On 4 May 1844, Lady Šumuru, gave birth to tenth princess, who would die prematurely on 26 February 1845. Lady Šumuru was demoted to "Noble Lady Tong" (彤貴人) on 21 October 1844 after she had given her gifts to an eunuch, Li Dexi. It was a serious offense; in 1778, Consort Dun was demoted one rank for killing a servant, while Lady Šumuru was demoted three ranks. In 1845 she lost two daughters in the span of a month: The seventh Princess in January, and the tenth Princess in February.

=== Xianfeng Era ===
Lady Šumuru had held in her new rank for about nearly six years when the Xianfeng Emperor established her as "Dowager Imperial Concubine Tong" (彤嬪), in February or March 1850, following the Emperor's passing. In 1860, she received New Year gifts together with Imperial Noble Consort Zhuangshun, Noble Consort Cheng, First Class Attendant Cai and Consort Xiang. At that time, her residence in the Forbidden City was Central Longevity Palace. She stayed in the Forbidden City with First Class Attendant Shang and another dowager concubines, while five of them fled to Rehe together with Xianfeng Emperor.

=== Tongzhi Era ===
In 1863, her second daughter, princess Shouxi of the Second Rank married Niohuru Jalafungga. In December 1874 or January 1875, Lady Šumuru was finally restored as "Noble Consort Tong" (彤貴妃). She died shortly after in 1877, and was interred in Mu Mausoleum of the Western Qing tombs.

== Titles ==
- During the reign of the Jiaqing Emperor (r. 1796–1820):
  - Lady Šumuru (from 3 June 1817)
- During the reign of the Daoguang Emperor (r. 1820–1850):
  - Noble Lady Mu (睦貴人; from 1831), sixth rank consort
  - Concubine Tong (彤嬪; from December 1832 or January 1833), fifth rank consort
  - Consort Tong (彤妃; from 3 December 1834), fourth rank consort
  - Noble Consort Tong (彤貴妃; from 26 January 1837), third rank consort
  - Noble Lady Tong (彤貴人; from 21 October 1844), sixth rank consort
- During the reign of the Xianfeng Emperor (r. 1850–1861):
  - Concubine Tong (彤嬪; from February/March 1850), fifth rank consort
- During the reign of the Tongzhi Emperor (r. 1861–1875):
  - Noble Consort Tong (彤貴妃; from December 1874 or January 1875), third rank consort

== Issue ==
- As Noble Consort Tong:
  - The Daoguang Emperor's seventh daughter (30 July 1840 – 27 January 1845)
  - Princess Shouxi of the Second Rank (壽禧和碩公主; 7 January 1842 – 10 September 1866), the Daoguang Emperor's eighth daughter
    - Married Jalafungga (扎拉豐阿; d. 1898) of the Manchu Niohuru clan in November/December 1863
  - The Daoguang Emperor's tenth daughter (4 May 1844 – 26 February 1845)

== Gallery ==
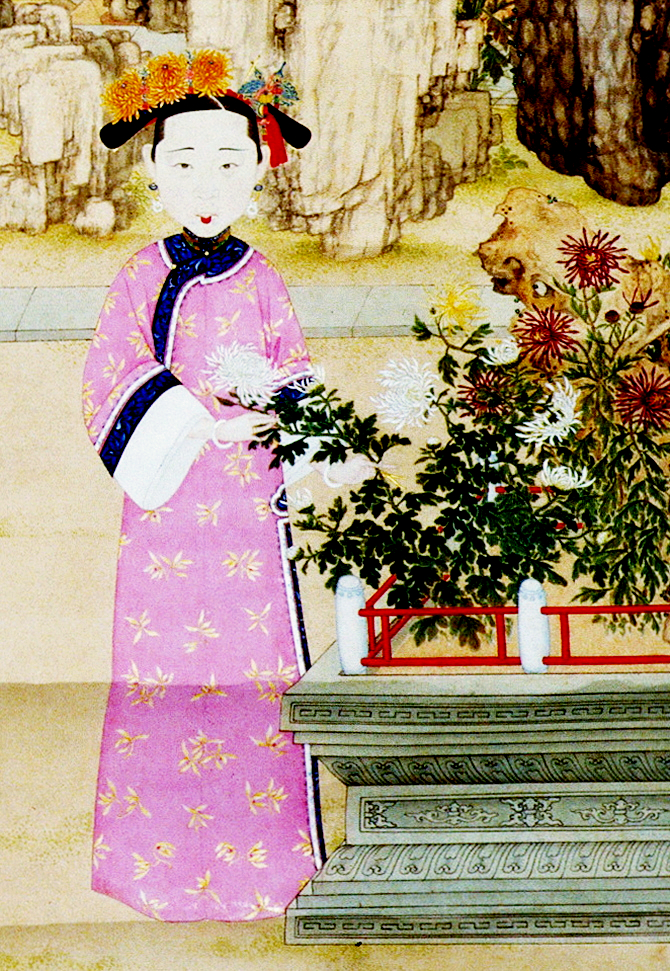
In daily dress

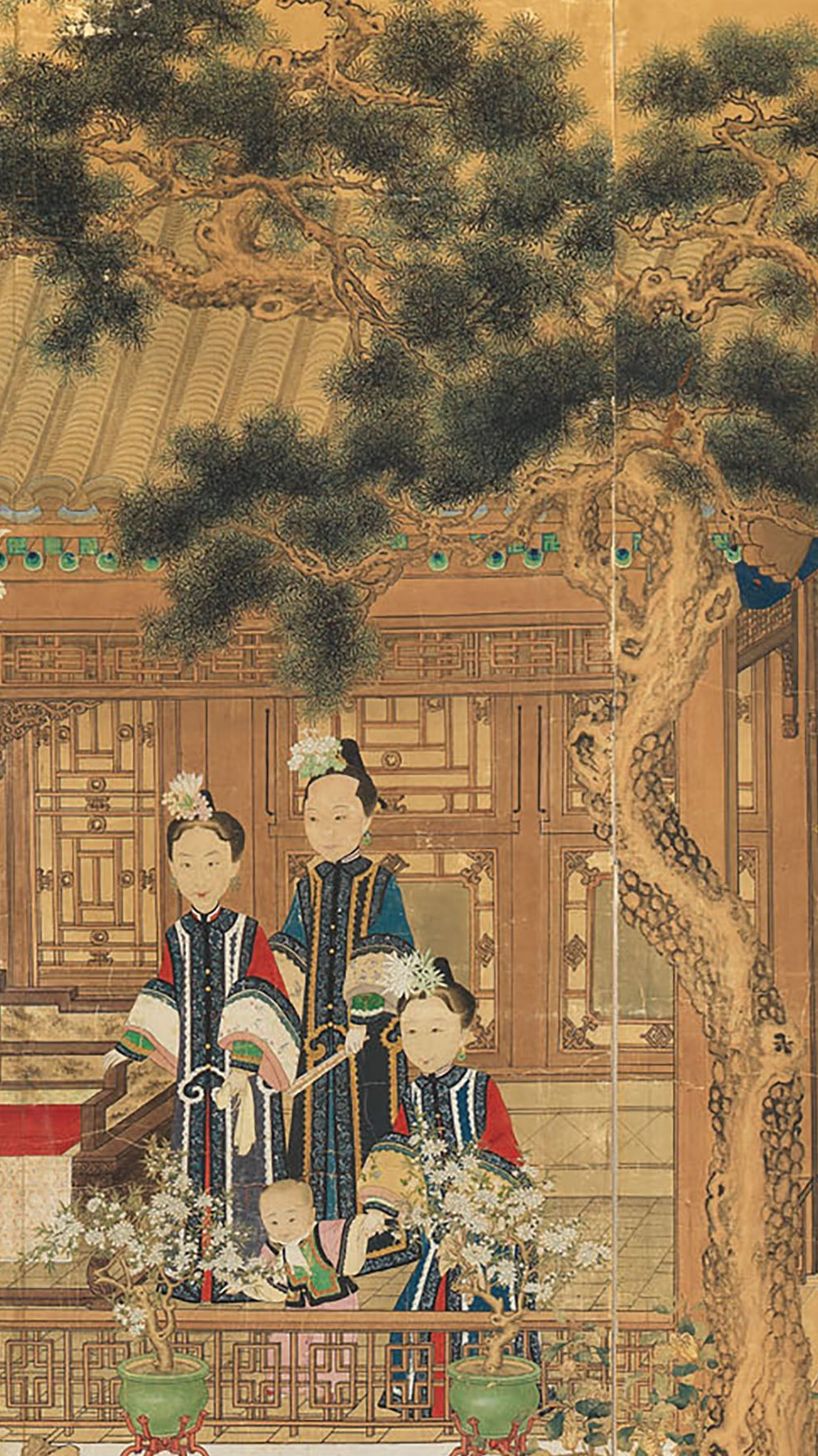
Princess Shouxi of the Second Rank with Consort Xiang

== In fiction and popular culture ==
- Portrayed by Deborah Poon in Curse of the Royal Harem (2011)

== See also ==
- Ranks of imperial consorts in China § Qing
- Royal and noble ranks of the Qing dynasty
