= Noble Consort Jia =

Consort of the Daoguang Emperor (1816–1890)

- Born: 21 November 1816
- Died: 24 May 1890 (aged 73); Study of Happiness, Forbidden City
- Burial: Mu Mausoleum, Western Qing tombs
- Spouse: Daoguang Emperor (m. 1835–1850)
- Father: Gogiya Bao'er

Noble Consort Jia
- Traditional Chinese: 佳貴妃
- Simplified Chinese: 佳贵妃
Transcriptions
Standard Mandarin
- Hanyu Pinyin: Jiā Guìfēi

Noble Consort Jia (simplified Chinese: 佳贵妃; traditional Chinese: 佳貴妃; pinyin: Jiā Guìfēi; 21 November 1816 - 24 May 1890), of the Manchu Plain Yellow Banner Gogiya clan, was a consort of the Daoguang Emperor of the Qing dynasty.

== Life ==
=== Family background ===
Noble Consort Jia was a member of Manchu Plain Yellow Banner Gogiya clan. Her personal name was Sanniu (三妞).

Father: Bao'er (保儿), a tutor of imperial soldiers (养育兵, pinyin: yangyubing)

- Paternal uncle: Tianbao (天保), an official (顶戴领催, dingdai lingcui)

=== Jiaqing era ===
Noble Consort Jia was born on 21 November 1816.

=== Daoguang era ===
In 1835, lady Gogiya entered the Forbidden City at the age of nineteen, and was given the title of "Noble Lady Jia" (佳贵人，"Jia" means "valoured" in Manchu language). She lived in the Palace of Accumulated Purity (Zhongcui gong) on the east site of the Forbidden City under the supervision of Empress Xiaoquancheng. In 1836, she was promoted to "Concubine Jia" (佳嬪), and moved to Chengqian Palace. In 1840, Concubine Jia was demoted to "Noble Lady Jia" (佳贵人). She remained childless during Daoguang era.

=== Xianfeng era ===
Noble Lady Jia was restored as "Concubine Jia" (佳嬪), and was given the Third Longevity Study (寿三所) as her residence. On 5 January 1861, Concubine Jia, Concubine Cheng, Imperial Noble Consort Zhuangshun, Consort Xiang and First Class Female Attendant Cai were rewarded during the celebrations of Chinese New Year. They fled to Chengde Mountain Resort together with Xianfeng Emperor.

=== Tongzhi era ===
After the coronation of Tongzhi Emperor, lady Gogiya received a title "Consort Jia" (佳妃). In 1874, she was promoted to "Noble Consort Jia" (佳貴妃).

=== Guangxu era ===
Noble Consort Jia died on 24 May 1890 at the Study of Happiness (吉祥所) in the Forbidden City. She was interred at Mu Mausoleum in Western Qing tombs.

== Titles ==
- During the reign of the Jiaqing Emperor (r. 1796–1820):
  - Lady Gogiya (from 21 November 1816)
- During the reign of the Daoguang Emperor (r. 1820–1850):
  - Noble Lady Jia (佳贵人; from 1835), sixth rank consort
  - Concubine Jia (佳嬪; from 1836), fifth rank consort
  - Noble Lady Jia (佳贵人; from 1840), sixth rank consort
- During the reign of the Xianfeng Emperor (r. 1850–1861):
  - Concubine Jia (佳嬪; from unknown date), fifth rank consort
- During the reign of the Tongzhi Emperor (r. 1861–1875):
  - Consort Jia (佳妃; from 1861), fourth rank consort
  - Noble Consort Jia (佳貴妃; from 1874), third rank consort

== See also ==
- Ranks of imperial consorts in China § Qing
- Royal and noble ranks of the Qing dynasty
