= Hengzhen =

Hengzhen (恒镇)
- Prince
- Born: 1944
- Died: 27 August 2023 (aged 78–79); Beijing, China
- Spouse: Tu Yanling
- Issue: Hengxing (恆星, Héngxīng) (born in 1977)
- House: Aisin Gioro
- Dynasty: Qing
- Father: Yuyan
- Mother: Magiya Jinglan

Hengzhen (恒镇, Héngzhèn; 1944 - 27 August 2023), was the eldest son of Yuyan. He was the sixth person in the line of succession to the Chinese throne. In the 1980s, as part of the forced entry of Chinese soldiers from the majority Han ethnic group to populate Xinjiang, at the time which was predominantly Uyghur, he worked on a documentary recounting how the Chinese soldiers developed subsistence agriculture in the region of Shihezi. He was a descendant of Emperor Daoguang, being ethnically Manchu.
