= Yu Yan =

Yu Yan may refer to:

- Yu Yan (constituency), a constituency of the Sha Tin District Council
- Yu Yan (physician), Chinese physician
- Yu Yan (singer), Chinese singer and actress
- Yuyan Chinese calligrapher
- Fable (album) or Yùyán, a 2000 album by Faye Wong

== See also ==
- Yuyan (disambiguation)
- Yan Yu (disambiguation)
