= Consort Tong =

Consort Tong may refer to:

- Empress Xiaokangzhang (1640–1663), original surname Tong, concubine of the Shunzhi Emperor
- Thừa Thiên (empress) (1762–1814), surname Tống, wife of the Gia Long Emperor
- Noble Consort Tong (1817–1877), concubine of the Daoguang Emperor
