= Palace of Prolonging Happiness =

Residence of imperial consorts in the Forbidden City

- 延禧宫
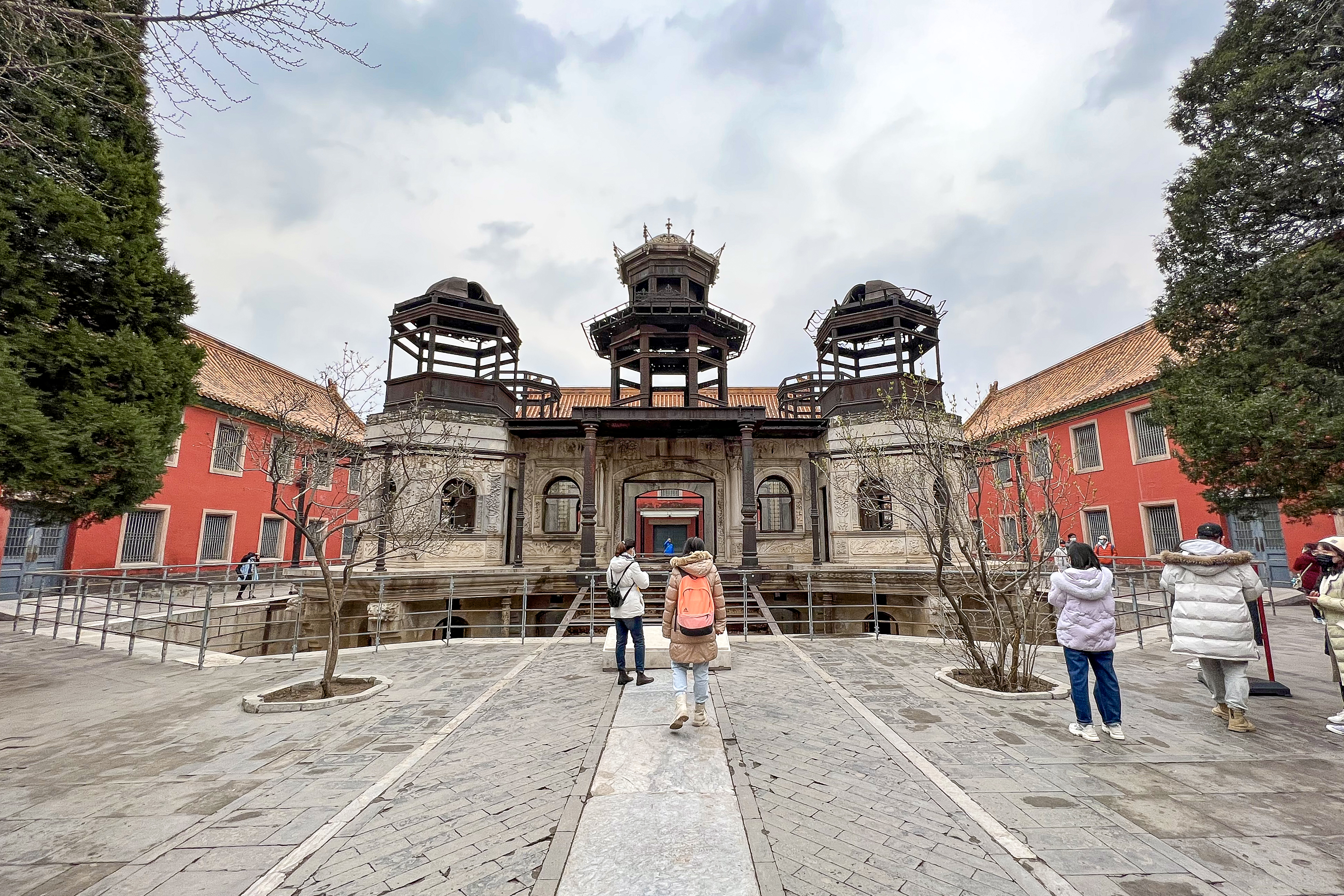
- The Lingzhao Pavilion in the Palace of Prolonging Happiness
- Former names: Palace of Longevity
- Alternative names: Yanxi Palace

General information
- Type: Palace
- Town or city: Forbidden City, Beijing
- Coordinates: 39.918870°N 116.392410°E
- Completed: 1420

The Palace of Prolonging Happiness (Chinese: 延禧宫; pinyin: Yánxǐgōng), also known as Yanxi Palace, is one of the Six Eastern Palaces in the inner court of the Forbidden City. It is situated behind the Hall for Ancestral Worship (奉先殿; Fèngxiāndiàn).

== History ==
Located in a remote area of the Forbidden City and described as one of its most "exotic" looking structures, this residence was built in 1420 as the "Palace of Longevity" (长寿宫; Chángshòugōng). In 1535, it was renamed the "Palace of Prolonging Auspiciousness" (延祺宫; Yánqígōng) by the Jiajing Emperor. It received its current name after being renovated in 1686, during the reign of the Kangxi Emperor.

The palace was destroyed by multiple fires between 1845 and 1855. Rebuilding work began in 1909, with a main hall being replaced by the "Water Hall" (水殿; Shuǐdiàn), a new three-story Western-style structure surrounded by a moat that was supposed to be filled with spring water from Yuquan Mountain near Beijing. Empress Dowager Longyu inscribed the plaque for it, which read "Lingzhao Pavilion" (灵沼轩; Língzhǎoxuān; lit. 'Pavilion of the Nimble Pond'); the building is more commonly known as the "Crystal Palace" (水晶宮; Shuǐjīnggōng). However, lack of funding and damage from a bombing raid in 1917 prevented the completion of the work. Today, only the iron cast and marble remain.

In 1931, three two-story warehouses were added to house the Palace Museum's artifacts. Since 2005, the warehouses have been used for the Ceramics Laboratory, the Research Centre for Ceramics, and the Research Centre for Traditional Calligraphy and Paintings.

== Residents ==
=== Qing dynasty ===
- First Class Attendant Xu (Kangxi Emperor)
- Noble Consort Wan (Qianlong Emperor)
- Consort Xin (Jiaqing Emperor)
- Concubine Tian (Daoguang Emperor)
- Consort Chang (Daoguang Emperor)
- Noble Consort Cheng (Daoguang Emperor)
- Concubine Yu (Daoguang Emperor)

== See also ==
- Story of Yanxi Palace
- Forbidden City
- Imperial Chinese harem system
