= Yuyan (disambiguation) =

Yuyan is a common Chinese homonym or synonym which has various meanings.

- Yuyan [Yùyán] (毓嵒), Chinese calligrapher
- Fable (album), [Yùyán] (寓言), a Mandarin pop album by Faye Wong; sometimes translated "Fable", or less accurately "Legend" in English.
- yuyan - in the Chinese literary tradition, a messenger between lovers (Zheng, 2010)

== See also ==
- The dictionary definition of 语言 at Wiktionary [yǔyán] language
- The dictionary definition of 预言 at Wiktionary [yùyán] prophecy
- The dictionary definition of 寓言 at Wiktionary [yùyán] fable
- Yu Yan (disambiguation)
- Yan Yu (disambiguation)
