= Yan Yu =

Yan Yu may refer to:

- Yan Yu (diplomat), Korean diplomat and ambassador
- Yan Yu (footballer), Chinese footballer
- Yan Yu (poetry theorist), poet of the Southern Song dynasty
- Yan Yu (statistician), Chinese-American statistician and marketing scientist
- Yan Yu (Three Kingdoms) (閻宇), general of the Shu Han state in the Three Kingdoms period
- Yan Yu (Yan Baihu's brother) (嚴輿) (died 196), younger brother of the Han dynasty warlord Yan Baihu
- "Beautiful Encounter (Yan Yu)", a 2009 song by Elva Hsiao from the album Diamond Candy

== See also ==
- Yu Yan (disambiguation)
- Yuyan (disambiguation)
