= Yuyan =

Pretender to the Chinese throne (1918-1999)

- Born: May 17, 1918; Beijing, China
- Died: January 18, 1999 (aged 80); Beijing, China
- Consort(s): Ma Jinglan (m. 1943; died 1948) Zhang Yunfang (m. 1949)
- Issue: Hengzhen; Hengkai; Hengjun
- House: Aisin Gioro
- Father: Pucheng
- Mother: Jinggui

Yuyan
- Chinese: 毓嵒
Transcriptions
Standard Mandarin
- Hanyu Pinyin: Yùyán

Yanrui (courtesy name)
- Traditional Chinese: 巖瑞
- Simplified Chinese: 岩瑞
Transcriptions
Standard Mandarin
- Hanyu Pinyin: Yánruì

Xiaoruizi (nickname)
- Chinese: 小瑞子
Transcriptions
Standard Mandarin
- Hanyu Pinyin: Xiǎoruìzǐ

Yuyan (17 May 1918 – 18 January 1999), courtesy name Yanrui, nickname Xiaoruizi, was a Chinese calligrapher of Manchu descent. He was a member of the Aisin Gioro clan, the imperial clan of the Qing dynasty. He claimed that he was appointed by Puyi, the last Emperor of China, as the heir to the throne. His claim is the subject of the travel adventure book The Empty Throne by British journalist Tony Scotland.

== Early life ==
Born in Wangfujing, Beijing, Yuyan was the second son of Pucheng (溥偁) and Jinggui (敬貴), a lady of the Fuca (富察) clan. His grandfather was Zailian (載濂; 1854–1917), a son of Yicong (1831–1889), the fifth son of the Daoguang Emperor. He was a distant cousin of Puyi, the Last Emperor.

In 1936, Yuyan was summoned by Puyi, who had been enthroned as the ruler of the puppet state Manchukuo in 1934 by the Empire of Japan, to join his imperial court in Changchun, Jilin. Yuyan was very close to Puyi, who called him "Xiaoruizi" (小瑞子; or "Little Rui").

== Life in the People's Republic of China ==
After the fall of Manchukuo, Yuyan was arrested by the Soviets and imprisoned from 1945 to 1950 near Khabarovsk in the Soviet Union's Far East Region along with Puyi. He was later sent back to China, where he was incarcerated in the Fushun War Criminals Management Centre in Liaoning from 1950 to 1957.

Yuyan was a pretender to the Chinese throne. He claimed that Puyi appointed him as heir when they were both imprisoned in the Soviet Union in 1950. In his autobiography, Puyi wrote only that he considered selecting Yuyan as his heir. Under a succession law adopted in 1937, Puyi's younger brother, Pujie, became next in line in succession to the throne.

Following his release from Fushun, Yuyan worked as a Chinese language teacher, and later in a haberdashery factory. He was arrested in 1959 and sent for hard labour at a public security detention centre near Beijing. Yuyan was arrested again in 1966 during the Cultural Revolution and sent to do hard labour in Shanxi. He was only released in 1979 and allowed to return to Beijing, where he became a road sweeper.

== After release from prison ==
Yuyan was a calligrapher and poet. In 1987, he was appointed as a state consultant on the restoration of the Prince Gong Mansion in Beijing.

Yuyan is the main character in the book The Empty Throne: The Quest for an Imperial Heir in the People's Republic of China (1993) by the British journalist Tony Scotland. Scotland was searching for an heir to the imperial throne of China.

== Family ==
- Elder sister: Yu Juying (毓菊英), married Chen Yingsan (陳英三), son of Chen Zengshou (陳曾壽).
- First wife, Ma Jinglan (馬靜蘭), of Manchu descent, married Yuyan in 1943.
  - Hengzhen (恆鎮; 1944 – 27 August 2023), first son, married Du Yanling (杜彥玲).
    - Jin Qixing (啟瑆; b. 1977), also known as Hengxing (恆瑆)
  - Hengkai (恆鎧; b. 1945), second son, married Liu Xiujuan (劉秀娟)
    - Jin Qiqi (金啟琪; b. 1980), also known as Yinghui (英輝;)
- Second wife, Zhang Yunfang (張雲訪), married Yuyan in 1949 after Ma Jinglan died in 1948 in Tianjin.
  - Hengjun (恆鈞; b. 1966), third son, married Fan Qin (范秦; b. 1971)
    - Jin Qitong (金啟桐; b. 29 October 1996)

=== Ancestry ===
Ancestors of Yuyan

Daoguang Emperor
Yicong
Consort Xiang
Zailian
Lady Hesheri, secondary consort
Pucheng
Saishang'a
Chonggang
Lady Fuca
Lady Arute
Yuyan
Fuca Jinggui

== See also ==
- Royal and noble ranks of the Qing dynasty
- Ranks of imperial consorts in China § Qing

== Succession ==
Yuyan Qing dynasty (Aisin Gioro) Born: 1918 Died: 1997
Titles in pretence
| Preceded by Xuantong Emperor (Puyi) | — TITULAR — Emperor of China; October 17, 1967–1997; Reason for succession failure: Qing dynasty abolished in 1912 | Succeeded by Hengzhen |
