= Concubine Shun =

Concubine of the Daoguang Emperor (1811–1868)

Concubine Shun (順嬪 那拉氏; 28 February 1811 – 11 April 1868) was a consort of the Daoguang Emperor.

== Family background ==
Imperial Concubine Shun was a member of main lineage of the Nara clan.

== Life ==
=== Jiaqing era ===
Imperial Concubine Shun was born on 28 February 1811.

=== Daoguang era ===
Lady Nara entered the Forbidden City in 1824 at the age of 13 as “First Class Female Attendant Shun" (顺常在, "shun" meaning "delicate"). In October 1824, she was promoted to Noble Lady Shun (顺贵人). In 1829, she was demoted back to First Class Female Attendant and didn't recover her previous title during her husband's reign. Lady Nara remained childless during Daoguang era.

=== Xianfeng era ===
In 1851, Lady Nara was restored as "Dowager Noble Lady Shun". On 5 January 1861, she was rewarded together with Imperial Concubine Jia, Imperial Concubine Cheng, Imperial Noble Consort Zhuangshun and other concubines of the previous emperor during the celebrations of Chinese New Year. Noble Lady Shun left in the Forbidden city when Xianfeng Emperor fled with 5 dowager concubines to Chengde Mountain Resort.

=== Tongzhi era ===
In 1861, Noble Lady Shun was promoted to the position of "Grand Dowager Imperial Concubine Shun". She died in 1868 and her coffin was interred at the Mu Mausoleum of the Western Qing tombs.
