= Princess Shouzang =

Qing dynasty princess (1829–1856)

- Princess of the Second Rank (和碩公主)
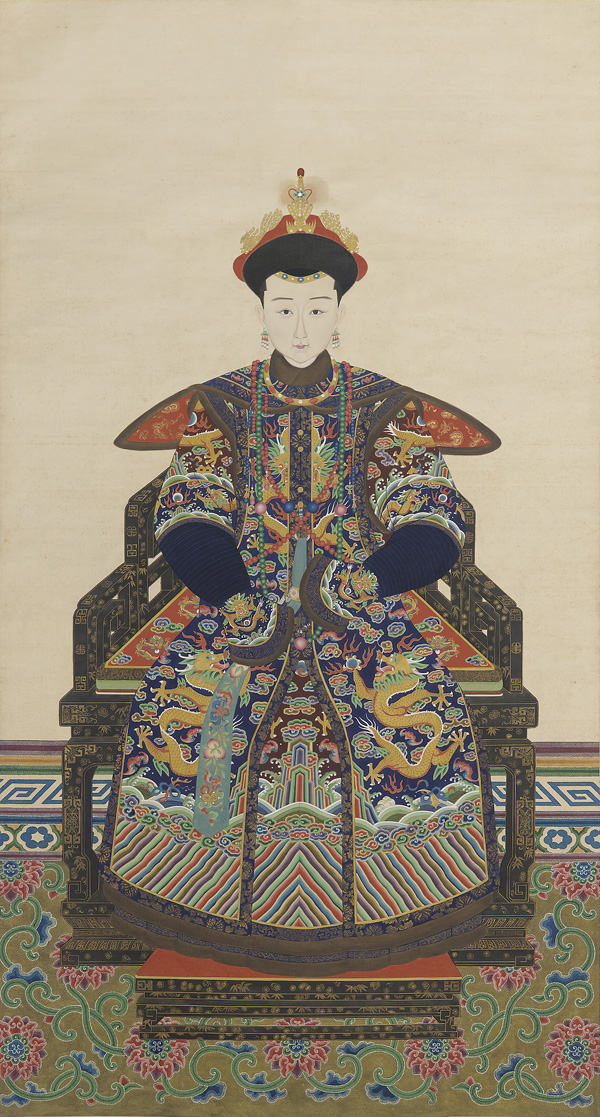
- Born: 15 November 1829; Yikun Palace, Beijing, Qing dynasty
- Died: 9 August 1856 (aged 26); Beijing, Qing dynasty
- Spouse: Enchōng (m. 1842)
- Issue: Two daughters
- House: Aisin-Gioro (by birth); Namdulu (by marriage)
- Father: Daoguang Emperor
- Mother: Consort Xiang

Princess Shouzang of the Second Rank (Chinese: 壽臧和碩公主; 15 November 1829 – 9 August 1856) was a princess of the Qing dynasty of China. She was the fifth daughter of the Daoguang Emperor and second daughter of her mother, Consort Xiang.

== Early life ==
Princess Shouzang was born on 15 November 1829 (Daoguang 9), in the māo hour (05:00–07:00). Her mother was Consort Xiang (祥妃) of the Niohuru (钮祜禄) clan. At the time of her birth the Empress Dowager Gongci was on a return-from-Shengjing ancestral ritual and did not re-enter the palace until the 24th day of that month. Only on the 17th day of the 11th lunar month, the Daoguang Emperor escorted the Empress Dowager to Yikun Palace to pay respects to Consort Xiang and the newborn. At that time, Consort Xiang lived in Yikun Palace, so Shouzang was also born and raised in Yikun Palace.

In Daoguang 15 (1835), during the “Longevity Festival”, the imperial princes and princesses gathered to pay tribute to the Emperor. However, the Fifth Princess was notably absent. From that year onward, she did not appear at birthday celebrations in the 16th, 17th, 18th, 19th, or 21st years of Daoguang's reign. In contrast, her elder sister, Princess Shou’an (寿安公主), and younger sister, Princess Shou’en (寿恩公主), remained present at these official ceremonies.

== Marriage and issue ==
In 10 March 1842 (Daoguang 22, 3rd month, 10th day), Lady Shòuzāng was granted the title “Princess Shòuzāng of the Heshuo rank” (寿臧和硕公主) and betrothed to Enchōng (恩崇), eldest legitimate son of Shusun Nara (镶红旗满洲那木都鲁氏), who held the posts of second-rank banner commander and deputy commander of Jinzhou. Their wedding took place on 3 December 1842: the princess was lifted in her palanquin from the inner court, passed west of Shenwu Gate, and was received at the groom’s mansion with full marriage rites.

She bore two daughters: the first in Daoguang 24 (1844) and the second in Daoguang 26 (1846).

=== Imperial stipend adjustment ===
In Xianfeng 3 (1853) the emperor, concerned that his sister’s income was meagre, ordered the Imperial Household Department to investigate. Finding she received only 300 taels of silver per year with no other allowances, they proposed granting her half the monthly and annual emoluments normally due to a “Gulun Princess” namely 130 taels’ rent per month, 500 taels’ salary per year, and 1,200 taels’ land rent per year. Thereafter Princess Shòuzāng’s annual income rose by over 1,600 taels, significantly easing her financial situation.

== Death and succession ==
Princess Shòuzāng died on 9 August 1856 (Xianfeng 6), at the sì hour (09:00–11:00), aged twenty-six. On 10 August the Xianfeng Emperor dispatched Prince Chun Yixuan with ten guards to attend her funeral; on 13 August he personally presided over the mourning banquet. Her husband, Enchōng, had no surviving sons; after his death on 1 October 1864 (Tongzhi 3), the emperor designated Princess Shòuzāng’s nephew Wénxī (文熙), son of her younger brother Enpū (恩普) as her heir. Wénxī later married the fourth daughter of Prince Yidun.
