= Empress Xiaoshencheng =

Empress of China from 1822 to 1833

- Empress Xiaoshencheng in ceremonial dress

Empress consort of the Qing dynasty
- Tenure: 28 December 1822 – 16 June 1833
- Predecessor: Empress Xiaoherui
- Successor: Empress Xiaoquancheng
- Born: 7 May 1792 (乾隆五十七年 五月 十七日)
- Died: 16 June 1833 (aged 41) (道光十三年 四月 二十九日); Forbidden City, Beijing, Qing China
- Burial: Mu Mausoleum, Western Qing tombs
- Spouse: Daoguang Emperor (m. 1809)
- Issue: Princess Duanmin of the First Rank
Posthumous name
- Empress Xiaoshen Minsu Zheshun Heyi Chenghui Dunke Xitian Yisheng Cheng (孝慎敏肅哲順和懿誠惠敦恪熙天詒聖成皇后)
- House: Tunggiya (佟佳)
- Father: Sumingga (舒明阿)

Empress Xiaoshencheng

Chinese name
- Traditional Chinese: 孝慎成皇后
- Simplified Chinese: 孝慎成皇后
Transcriptions
Standard Mandarin
- Hanyu Pinyin: Xiàoshènchéng Huánghòu

Manchu name
- Manchu script: ᡥᡳᠶᠣᠣᡧᡠᠩᡤᠠ ᠣᠯᡥᠣᠪᠠ ᡧᠠᠩᡤᠠ ᡥᡡᠸᠠᠩᡥᡝᠣ
- Romanization: hiyoošungga olhoba šanggan hūwangheo

Empress Xiaoshencheng (7 May 1792 – 16 June 1833) was the first empress consort of the Daoguang Emperor of the Qing dynasty of China. She was empress consort from 1822 until her death in 1833.

== Life ==
=== Family background ===
Empress Xiaoshencheng's personal name was not recorded in history.

- Father: Sumingga (舒明阿), served as the Magistrate of Yong'an from 1771 to 1772 and the Magistrate of Xin'an from 1776 to 1777, and held the title of a first class duke (一等公)

=== Qianlong era ===
The future Empress Xiaoshencheng was born on the 17th day of the fifth lunar month in the 57th year of the reign of the Qianlong Emperor, which translates to 5 July 1792 in the Gregorian calendar.

=== Jiaqing era ===
On 2 February 1809, Lady Tunggiya married Minning, the second son of the Jiaqing Emperor, and became his second primary consort. On 29 July 1813, she gave birth to his first daughter, Princess Duanmin of the First Rank, who would die prematurely on 7 December 1819.

=== Daoguang era ===
The Jiaqing Emperor died on 2 September 1820 and was succeeded by Minning, who was enthroned as the Daoguang Emperor. On 28 December 1822, Lady Tunggiya, as the emperor's primary consort, was instated as Empress. As Empress, Lady Tunggiya was placed in charge of the emperor's harem. She died on 16 June 1833 and was interred in the Mu Mausoleum of the Western Qing tombs.

== Titles ==
- During the reign of the Qianlong Emperor (r. 1735–1796):
  - Lady Tunggiya (from 5 July 1792)
- During the reign of the Jiaqing Emperor (r. 1796–1820):
  - Primary consort (嫡福晉; from 2 February 1809 (Note: 嘉慶十三年 十二月 十八日))
- During the reign of the Daoguang Emperor (r. 1820–1850):
  - Empress (皇后; from 28 December 1822 (Note: 道光二年 十一月 十六日))
  - Empress Xiaoshen (孝慎皇后; from 7 September 1833 (Note: 道光十三年 七月 二十四日))
- During the reign of the Xianfeng Emperor (r. 1850–1861):
  - Empress Xiaoshencheng (孝慎成皇后; from 26 October 1850 (Note: 道光三十年 九月 二十二日))

== Issue ==
- As primary consort:
  - Princess Duanmin of the First Rank (端憫固倫公主; 29 July 1813 – 7 December 1819), the Daoguang Emperor's first daughter

== Gallery ==
In daily dress

In daily dress

== In fiction and popular culture ==
- Portrayed by Wong Man-ching in The Rise and Fall of Qing Dynasty (1988)
- Portrayed by Myolie Wu in Curse of the Royal Harem (2011)

== See also ==
- Ranks of imperial consorts in China#Qing
- Royal and noble ranks of the Qing dynasty

== Notes ==
Empress Xiaoshencheng Tunggiya Clan (1636–1912) Died: 1833
Chinese royalty
Preceded by Empress Xiaoherui of the Niohuru clan	Empress consort of China; 28 December 1822 – 16 June 1833	Succeeded by Empress Xiaoquancheng of the Niohuru clan
