= Consort Xiang (Daoguang) =

Consort of the Daoguang Emperor (1808–1861)

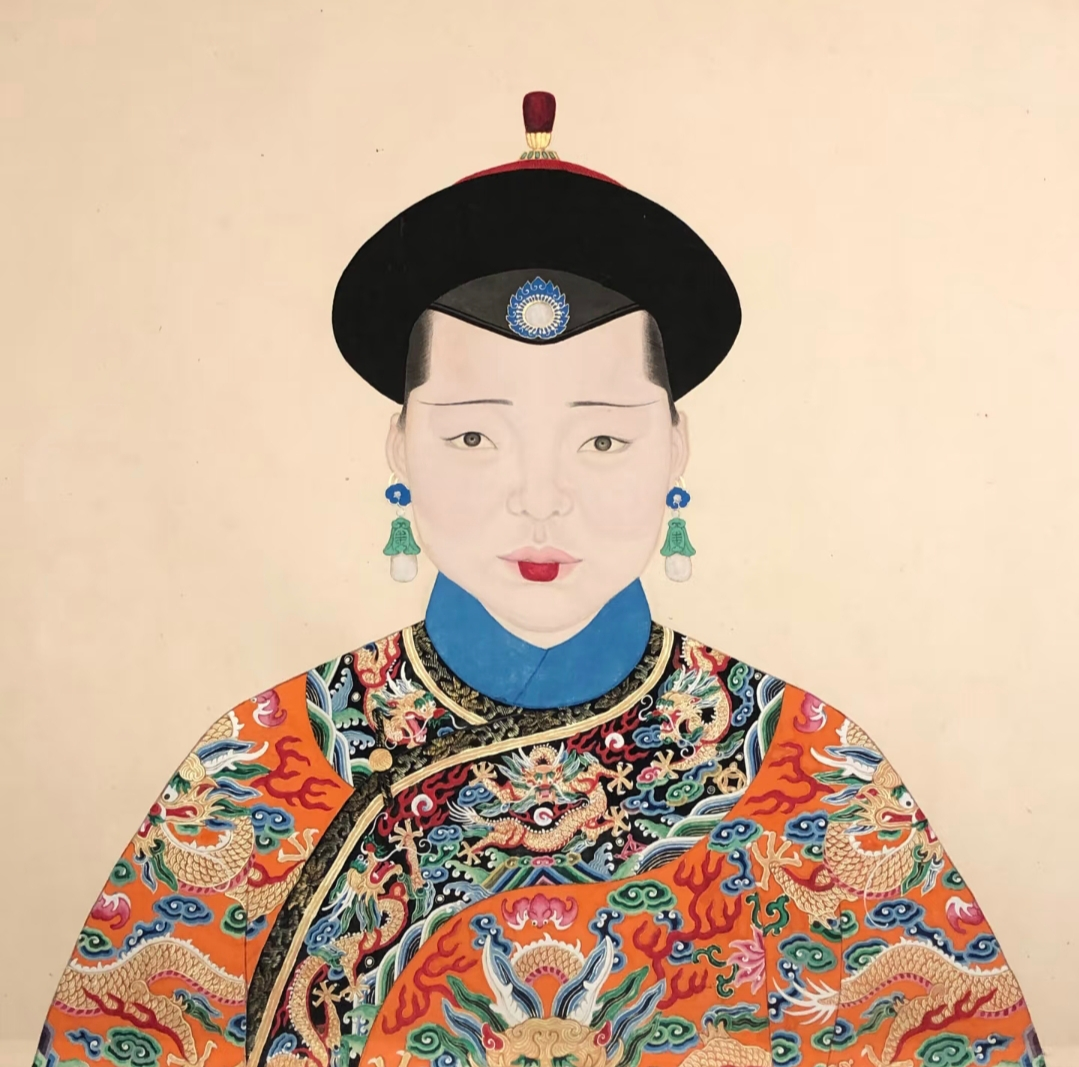
- Qing dynasty portrait of Consort Xiang
- Born: 9 February 1808 (嘉慶十三年 正月 十三日)
- Died: 15 February 1861 (aged 53) (咸豐十一年 正月 六日); Chengde Mountain Resort
- Burial: Mu Mausoleum, Western Qing tombs
- Spouse: Daoguang Emperor (m. 1821; died 1850)
- Issue: Second daughter Princess Shouzang of the Second Rank; Yicong, Prince Dunqin of the First Rank
Posthumous name
- Consort Xiang (祥妃)
- House: Niohuru (鈕祜祿; by birth); Aisin Gioro (by marriage)

Consort Xiang
- Traditional Chinese: 祥妃
- Simplified Chinese: 祥妃
Transcriptions
Standard Mandarin
- Hanyu Pinyin: Xiáng Fēi

Consort Xiang (9 February 1808 – 15 February 1861), of the Manchu Niohuru clan, was a consort of the Daoguang Emperor of the Qing dynasty of China. She was 26 years his junior and of the same age as his eldest son Prince Yiwei.

== Life ==
=== Family background ===
Consort Xiang's personal name was not recorded in history.

- Father: Jiufu (久福), served as a fifth rank literary official (郎中)
  - Paternal grandfather: Suoning'an (索宁安), Hengde's son (恒德)
  - Paternal uncle: Jiuxiu (久秀)
- Mother: Lady Fuca (1770–?)
  - Maternal grandfather: Muqing'an (穆青安), Fuliang's son and Maci's grandson
- Five brothers
- One elder sister : wife of Aisin-Gioro Xiubao (秀保)

=== Jiaqing era ===
The future Consort Xiang was born on the 13th day of the first lunar month in the 13th year of the reign of the Jiaqing Emperor, which translates to 9 February 1808 in the Gregorian calendar.

=== Daoguang era ===
In 1821, Lady Niohuru entered the Forbidden City and was granted the title "Noble Lady Xiang" by the Daoguang Emperor. On 26 December 1823, she was elevated to "Concubine Xiang". On 2 March 1825, she gave birth to the emperor's second daughter, who would die prematurely on 27 August 1825.

On 30 May 1825, Lady Niohuru was elevated to "Consort Xiang". She gave birth on 15 November 1829 to the emperor's fifth daughter, Princess Shouzang of the Second Rank, and on 23 July 1831 to his fifth son, Yicong.

Even though Lady Niohuru and the Daoguang Emperor had three children, the emperor did not seem to favour her. In 1837, he demoted her to "Noble Lady Xiang" for reasons unknown. Lady Niohuru's father, Jiufu, was found guilty of corruption just before her demotion, but official records did not seem to point out any connection between her father's indictment and her demotion.

=== Xianfeng era ===
The Daoguang Emperor died on 26 February 1850 and was succeeded by his fourth son Yizhu, who was enthroned as the Xianfeng Emperor. The Xianfeng Emperor elevated Lady Niohuru to "Dowager Concubine Xiang". She died on 15 February 1861 and was interred in the Mu Mausoleum of the Western Qing tombs.

== Titles ==
- During the reign of the Jiaqing Emperor (r. 1796–1820):
  - Lady Niohuru (from 9 February 1808)
- During the reign of the Daoguang Emperor (r. 1820–1850):
  - Noble Lady Xiang (祥貴人; from 1821), sixth rank consort
  - Concubine Xiang (祥嬪; from 26 December 1823), fifth rank consort
  - Consort Xiang (祥妃; from 30 May 1825), fourth rank consort
  - Noble Lady Xiang (祥貴人; from 1837), sixth rank consort
- During the reign of the Xianfeng Emperor (r. 1850–1861):
  - Concubine Xiang (祥嬪; from 16 April 1851), fifth rank consort
- During the reign of the Tongzhi Emperor (r. 1861–1875):
  - Consort Xiang (祥妃; from 23 November 1861), fourth rank consort

== Issue ==
- As Concubine Xiang:
  - The Daoguang Emperor's second daughter (2 March 1825 – 27 August 1825)
- As Consort Xiang:
  - Princess Shouzang of the Second Rank (壽臧和碩公主; 15 November 1829 – 9 August 1856), the Daoguang Emperor's fifth daughter
    - Married Enchong (恩崇; d. 1864) of the Manchu Namdulu (那木都魯) clan on 3 January 1843
  - Yicong (奕誴; 23 July 1831 – 18 February 1889), the Daoguang Emperor's fifth son, granted the title Prince Dun of the Second Rank in 1838, elevated to Prince Dun of the First Rank in 1860, posthumously honoured as Prince Dunqin of the First Rank

== Gallery ==
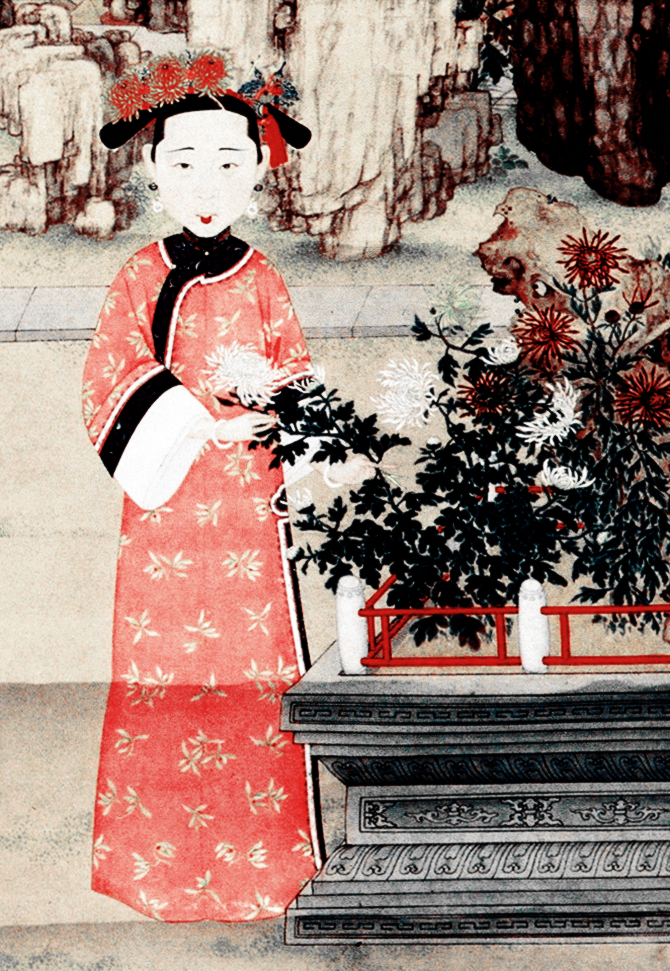
Consort Xiang

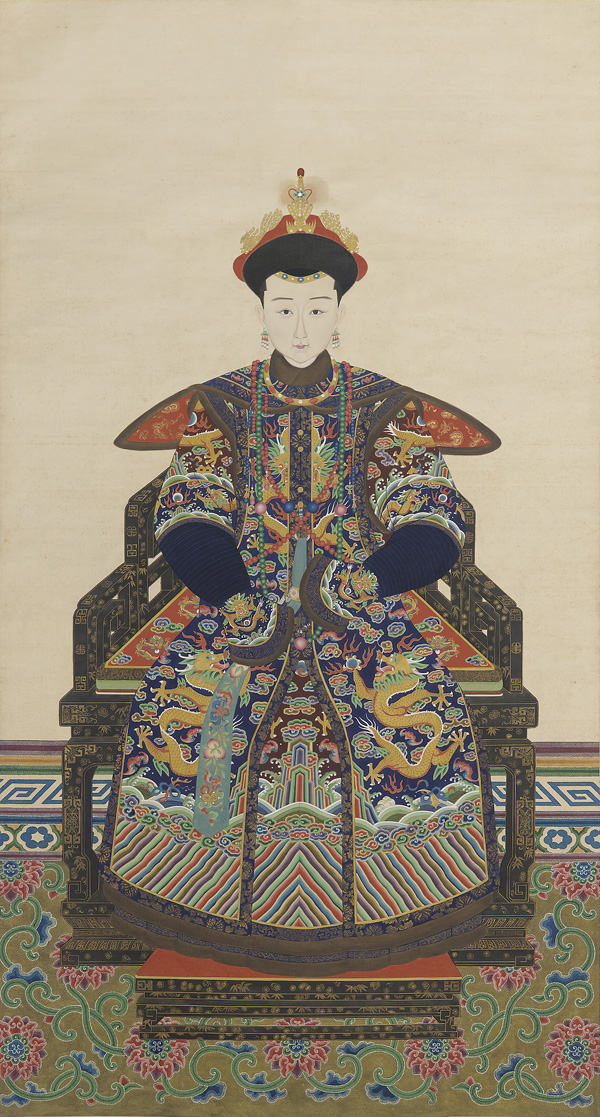
Princess Shouzang of the Second Rank in the court dress

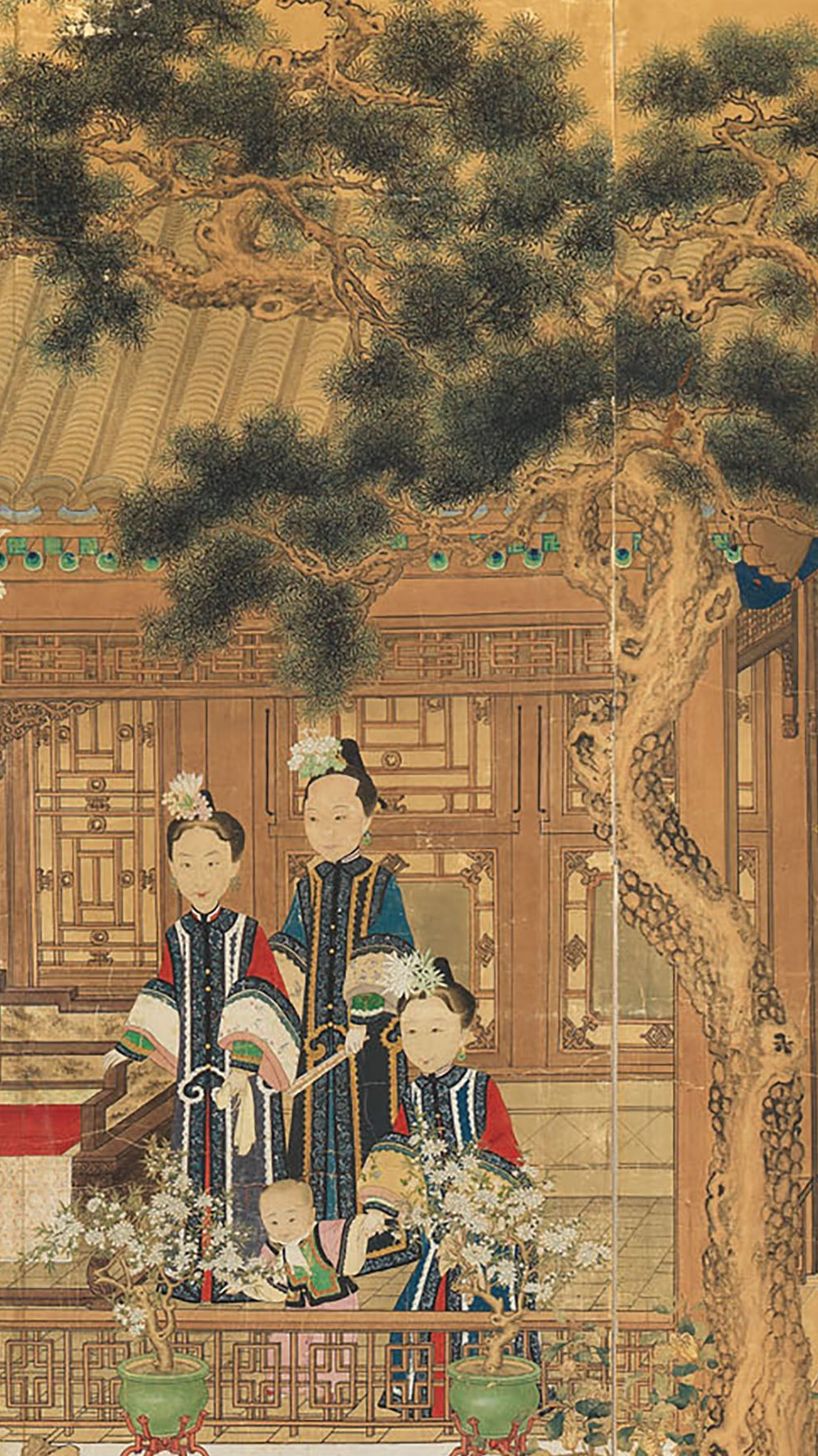
Consort Xiang with Princess Shouxi, Consort Chang and Noble Consort Cheng

== In fiction and popular culture ==
- Portrayed by Kingdom Yuen in The Rise and Fall of Qing Dynasty (1988)
- Portrayed by Charmaine Li in Curse of the Royal Harem (2011)

== See also ==
- Ranks of imperial consorts in China#Qing
- Royal and noble ranks of the Qing dynasty
