= Noble Consort Cheng =

Consort of the Daoguang Emperor (1813–1888)

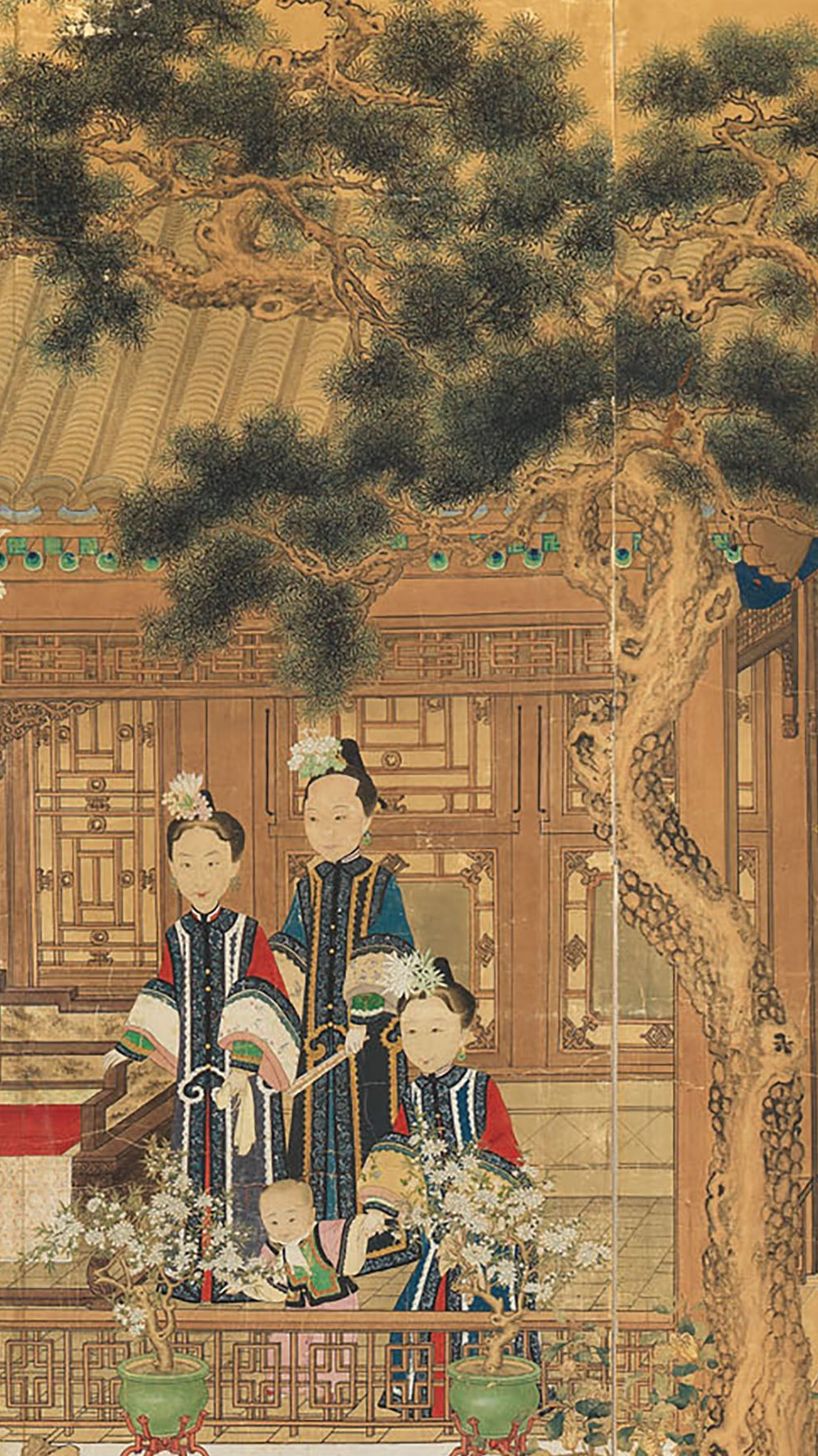
- Concubine Cheng with Noble Lady Chang and Noble Lady Xiang with Princess Shouxi
- Born: 10 March 1813 (嘉庆十七年二月二十日)
- Died: 10 May 1888 (aged 75) (光绪三年 四月 二十日); Shou'an Palace, Forbidden City
- Burial: Mu Mausoleum, Western Qing tombs
- Spouse: Daoguang Emperor (before 1828)
- House: Niohuru (鈕祜祿; by birth); Aisin Gioro (by marriage)

Noble Consort Cheng
- Traditional Chinese: 成貴妃
- Simplified Chinese: 成贵妃
Transcriptions
Standard Mandarin
- Hanyu Pinyin: Chéng Guìfēi

Noble Consort Cheng (simplified Chinese: 成贵妃; traditional Chinese: 成貴妃; pinyin: Chéng Guìfēi; 10 March 1813 – 10 May 1888), of the Plain Red Banner Niohuru clan, was a consort of Daoguang Emperor.

== Life ==
=== Family background ===
Noble Consort Cheng's personal name wasn't recorded in history. Her family belonged to the Plain Red Banner. Most Qing dynasty sources do not ponder her family background.

=== Jiaqing era ===
Lady Niohuru was born on the 21st day of the 2nd lunar month of the 17th year, which translates to 10 March 1813 in the Gregorian calendar.

=== Daoguang era ===
Lady Niohuru entered the Forbidden City at the age of sixteen in 1828 and was bestowed the title "Noble Lady Cheng" (成贵人; "Cheng" meaning "virtuous, perfect"). She lived in the side hall of the Palace of Prolonging Happiness (延禧宫). At that time, she was rather naïve and did not adjust well to the imperial life. Noble Lady Cheng offended the Daoguang Emperor and was demoted to "First Class Female Attendant Yu" (余常在; "Yu" meaning "balanced") shortly after the entry. Her previous title was restored in 1837.

In 1845, a fire burnt down Yanxigong so Lady Niohuru moved to the Palace of Universal Happiness (Xianfugong) in the Forbidden City. In 1846, she was promoted to "Concubine Cheng" (成嬪). One time, Concubine Cheng failed to show respect to Imperial Noble Consort Jing and this greatly infuriated Daoguang. Thus, she was demoted to "Noble Lady Cheng" (成貴人) in 1849. Noble Lady Cheng remained childless. In 1850, the Daoguang Emperor passed away.

=== Xianfeng era ===
According to the tradition, every new emperor was supposed to confer a higher title to the predecessor’s concubines. Lady Niohuru was elevated to "Concubine Cheng" (成嬪), and moved to the Eastern Longevity Palace. She was one of the five dowager consorts who fled to Rehe.

=== Tongzhi era ===
Concubine Cheng was promoted to "Consort Cheng" (成妃). Her former residence in the Forbidden City, Yanxi Palace, was not restored because of tight budget in 1872. She moved to Shou'an Palace and lived there together with Noble Consort Jia.

=== Guangxu era ===
Consort Cheng was promoted to "Noble Consort Cheng" (成貴妃) in 1875. Lady Niohuru died in 1888 in Shou'an Palace on the western side of the Forbidden City. She was interred at Mu Mausoleum at Western Qing Tombs in 1891.

== Titles ==
- During the reign of the Jiaqing Emperor (r. 1796–1820):
  - Lady Niohuru (from 10 March 1813)
- During the reign of the Daoguang Emperor (r. 1820–1850):
  - Noble Lady Cheng (成貴人; from 1828), sixth rank consort
  - First Class Female Attendant Yu (餘常在; from 1829), seventh rank consort
  - Noble Lady Cheng (成貴人; from 1837), sixth rank consort
  - Concubine Cheng (成嬪; from 1846), fifth rank consort
  - Noble Lady Cheng (成貴人; from 1849), sixth rank consort
- During the reign of the Xianfeng Emperor (r. 1850–1861):
  - Concubine Cheng (成嬪; from unknown date), fifth rank consort
- During the reign of the Tongzhi Emperor (r. 1861–1875):
  - Consort Cheng (成妃; from unknown date), fourth rank consort
- During the reign of the Guangxu Emperor (r. 1875–1908):
  - Noble Consort Cheng (成貴妃; from 1875), third rank consort

== In fiction and popular culture ==
- Portrayed by Jess Sum Cheuk Ying in Curse of the Royal Harem as Niohuru Xiucheng (钮祜禄·秀成), Noble Consort Cheng.

== See also ==
- Ranks of imperial consorts in China#Qing
- Royal and noble ranks of the Qing dynasty

== Sources ==
- "Daoguang Reign". en.dpm.org.cn.
- "Palace of Prolonging Happiness (Yanxigong), Forbidden City, Beijing". www.travelchinaguide.com.
- Zhao, Erxun (1928). Draft History of Qing (Qing Shi Gao) (in Chinese).
