= Consort Chang =

Consort of the Daoguang Emperor (1808–1860)

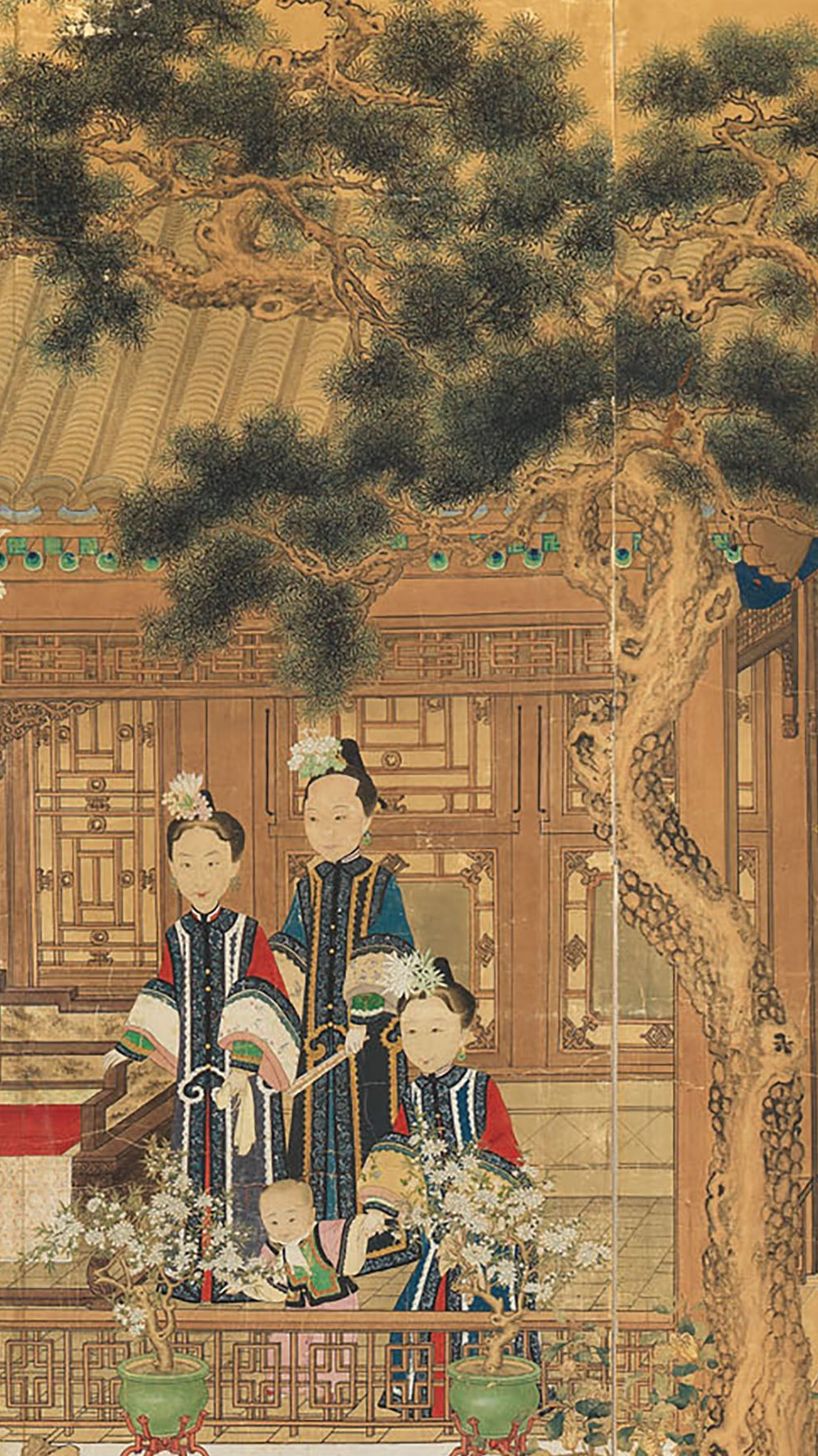
- Concubine Cheng with Noble Lady Chang and Noble Lady Xiang with Princess Shouxi
- Born: 31 December 1808 (嘉庆十三年十一月十五日)
- Died: 7 October 1860 (咸丰十年九月二十三日); Forbidden City
- Burial: Mu Mausoleum, Western Qing tombs
- Spouse: Daoguang Emperor (before 1822)
Posthumous name
- Consort Chang (常妃)
- House: Hešeri (赫舍里; by birth); Aisin Gioro (by marriage)
- Father: Ronghai
- Mother: Lady Irgen Gioro

Consort Chang
- Traditional Chinese: 常妃
- Simplified Chinese: 常妃
Transcriptions
Standard Mandarin
- Hanyu Pinyin: Cháng Fēi

Consort Chang (31 December 1808 – 10 May 1860), of the Manchu Hešeri clan belonging to the Bordered Blue Banner, was a consort of the Daoguang Emperor.

== Life ==
=== Family background ===
Consort Chang's personal name wasn't recorded in history. She was a member of a prominent Manchu Hešeri clan belonging to the Bordered Blue Banner.

Father: Ronghai (容海), a third rank military official

- Paternal grandfather: Shanqing, a magistrate of Lizhou, Yingzhou, Huizhou
- Paternal grandmother: Lady Gioro

Mother: Lady Irgen Gioro

- Maternal grandfather: Qiming (奇明)

Two younger brothers:

- First younger brother: Rushan (如山; b.1811), a jinshi of 1838 and third rank literary official in Sichuan
- Second younger brother: Longshan (隆山)

Two elder sisters

- First elder sister: Wife of Nianchang'a (年长阿), an examiner (员外郎, pinyin: yuanwailang) of the Manchu Bordered Blue Banner
- Second elder sister: Wife of Linxiang (麟翔), a second rank military official (总宾, pinyin:zongbin) and Grand Minister of Internal Affairs of the Mongol Plain White Banner.

=== Jiaqing era ===
Lady Hesheri was born in the 9th day of the 12th lunar month of the 12th year of Jiaqing era, which translates to 31 December 1808 in the Gregorian calendar.

=== Daoguang era ===
Lady Hesheri entered the Forbidden City between 1822 and 1825. Upon the entry, she was granted a title "Noble Lady Zhen" (珍贵人; "zhen" meaning "pearl", "precious"). Noble Lady Zhen was promoted to "Concubine Zhen" (珍嫔) in May 1825. and to "Consort Zhen" (珍妃) in September 1825. She was demoted to "Concubine Zhen" (珍嫔) during her visit in Yuanmingyuan in 1826 because her Yanxi palace used a coach with four horses. Concubine Zhen didn't reflect herself well after her first demotion, so she was demoted to "Noble Lady Chang" in 1830 (常贵人, "chang" meaning "ordinary", "common"), and moved to Xianfu Palace on the western side of the Forbidden City. She remained childless during the Daoguang era. The Daoguang Emperor died on 26 February 1850.

=== Xianfeng era ===
After the enthronement of Xianfeng Emperor, Lady Hesheri was restored as "Concubine Chang" (常嫔). She lived in Shoukang palace in the western part of the Forbidden City. She died on 10 May 1860 in the Garden of Elegant Spring in Yuanmingyuan. She was posthumously granted a title "Consort Chang" (常妃) by the Tongzhi Emperor, the son of the Xianfeng Emperor.

== Titles ==
- During the reign of the Jiaqing Emperor (r. 1796–1820):
  - Lady Hesheri (from 31 December 1808)
- During the reign of the Daoguang Emperor (r. 1820–1850):
  - Noble Lady Zhen (珍貴人; from 1822), sixth rank consort
  - Concubine Zhen (珍嬪; from May 1825), fifth rank consort
  - Consort Zhen (珍妃; from September 1825), fourth rank consort
  - Concubine Zhen (珍嬪; from 1826), fifth rank consort
  - Noble Lady Chang (常貴人; from 1830), sixth rank consort
- During the reign of the Xianfeng Emperor (r. 1850–1861):
  - Concubine Chang (常嬪; from unknown date), fifth rank consort
  - Consort Chang (常妃; from 1860)

== See also ==
- Ranks of imperial consorts in China#Qing
- Royal and noble ranks of the Qing dynasty
