= Daoguang Emperor =

Emperor of China from 1820 to 1850

Daoguang Emperor 道光帝
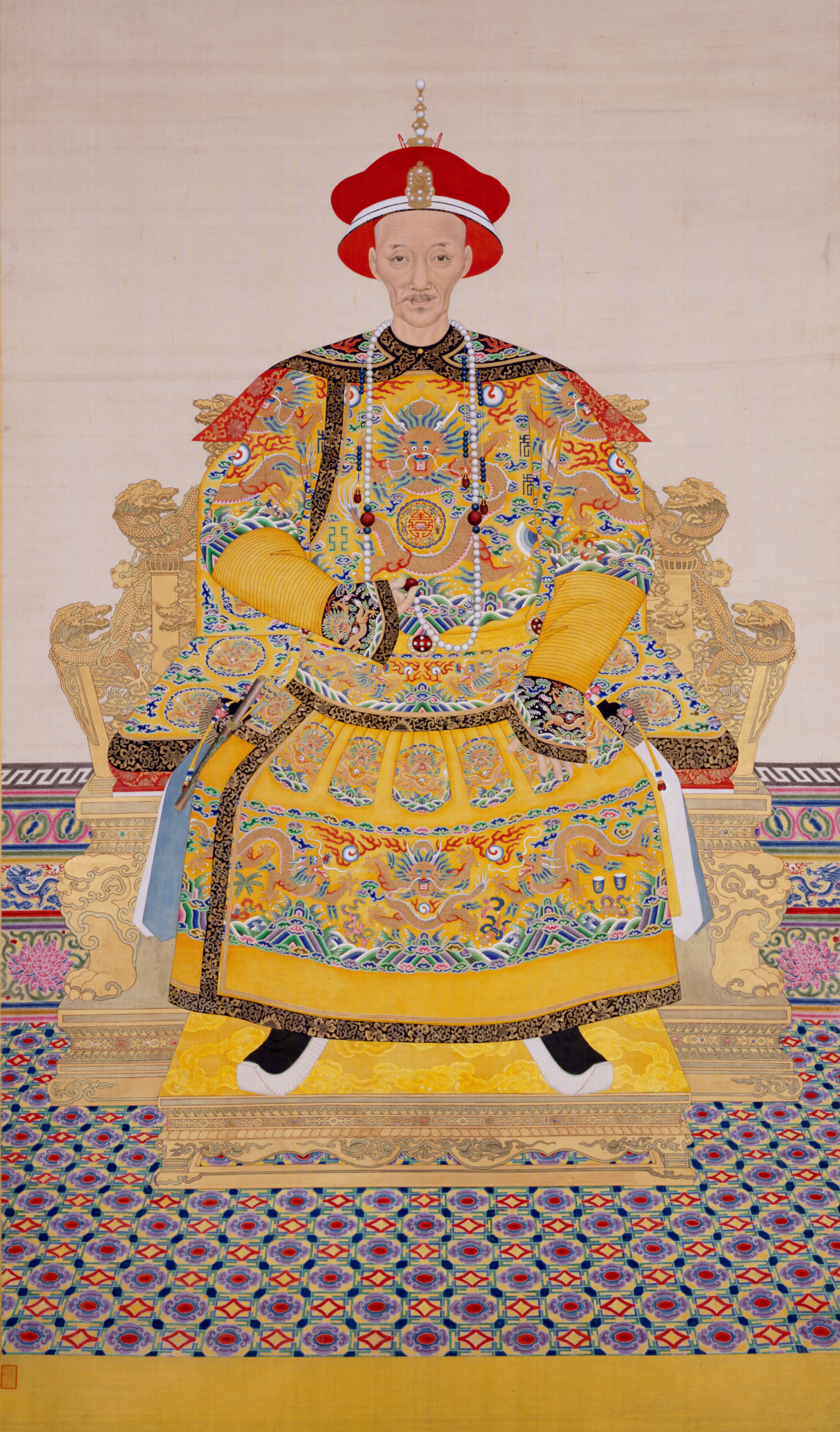
- State portrait, by anonymous painter, c. 1820–1850

Emperor of the Qing dynasty
- Reign: 3 October 1820 – 26 February 1850
- Predecessor: Jiaqing Emperor
- Successor: Xianfeng Emperor

Prince Zhi of the First Rank
- Tenure: 29 September 1813 – 3 October 1820
- Born: 16 September 1782; Xiefang Hall, Forbidden City (in present-day Beijing)
- Died: 26 February 1850 (aged 67); Imperial Gardens (in present-day Beijing)
- Burial: Mu Mausoleum, Western Qing tombs
- Consorts: Empress Xiaomucheng (m. 1796; died 1808) Empress Xiaoshencheng (m. 1809; died 1833) Empress Xiaoquancheng (m. 1821; died 1840) Empress Xiaojingcheng (m. 1825)
- Issue Detail: Yiwei, Prince Yinzhi of the Second Rank; Princess Shou'an of the First Rank; Princess Shouzang of the Second Rank; Princess Shou'en of the First Rank; Xianfeng Emperor; Yicong, Prince Dunqin of the First Rank; Yixin, Prince Gongzhong of the First Rank; Yixuan, Prince Chunxian of the First Rank; Yihe, Prince Zhongduan of the Second Rank; Yihui, Prince Fujing of the Second Rank
Names
- Minning (旻寧); Manchu: Min ning (ᠮᡳᠨ ᠨᡳᠩ)
Era dates
- Daoguang (道光): 3 February 1821 – 31 January 1851; Manchu: Doro eldengge (ᡩᠣᡵᠣ ᡝᠯᡩᡝᠩᡤᡝ); Mongolian: Төр Гэрэлт (ᠲᠥᠷᠥ ᠭᠡᠷᠡᠯᠲᠦ)
Posthumous name
- Emperor Xiaotian Fuyun Lizhong Tizheng Zhiwen Shengwu Zhiyong Renci Jianqin Xiaomin Kuanding Cheng (效天符運立中體正至文聖武智勇仁慈儉勤孝敏寬定成皇帝); Manchu: Abka be Songkoloho, Forgon de Acabuha, Dulimba be Ilibuha, Tob be Dursulehe, Ten -i Šu, Enduringge Horonggo, Mergen Baturu, Gosin Jilan, Boljonggo Kicebe, Hiyoošungga Ulhisu Šanggan Hūwangdi (ᠠᠪᡴᠠ ᠪᡝ ᠰᠣᠩᡴᠣᠯᠣᡥᠣ᠈ ᡶᠣᡵᡤᠣᠨ ᡩᡝ ᠠᠴᠠᠪᡠᡥᠠ᠈ ᡩᡠᠯᡳᠮᠪᠠ ᠪᡝ ᡳᠯᡳᠪᡠᡥᠠ᠈ ᡨᠣᠪ ᠪᡝ ᡩᡠᡵᠰᡠᠯᡝᡥᡝ᠈ ᡨᡝᠨ ᡳ ᡧᡠ᠈ ᡝᠨᡩᡠᡵᡳᠩᡤᡝ ᡥᠣᡵᠣᠩᡤᠣ᠈ ᠮᡝᡵᡤᡝᠨ ᠪᠠᡨᡠᡵᡠ᠈ ᡤᠣᠰᡳᠨ ᠵᡳᠯᠠᠨ᠈ ᠪᠣᠯᠵᠣᠩᡤᠣ ᡴᡳᠴᡝᠪᡝ᠈ ᡥᡳᠶᠣᠣᡧᡠᠩᡤᠠ ᡠᠯᡥᡳᠰᡠ ᡧᠠᠩᡤᠠᠨ ᡥᡡᠸᠠᠩᡩᡳ)
Temple name
- Xuanzong (宣宗); Manchu: Siowandzung (ᠰᡳᡠᠸᠠᠨᡯᡠᠩ)
- House: Aisin-Gioro
- Dynasty: Qing
- Father: Jiaqing Emperor
- Mother: Empress Xiaoshurui

Chinese name
- Chinese: 道光帝
Transcriptions
Standard Mandarin
- Hanyu Pinyin: Dàoguāng Dì
- Wade–Giles: Tao^{4}-kuang^{1} Ti^{4}
- IPA: [tâʊkwáŋ tî]

The Daoguang Emperor (16 September 1782 – 26 February 1850), also known by his temple name Emperor Xuanzong of Qing, personal name Minning, was the seventh emperor of the Qing dynasty, and the sixth Qing emperor to rule over China proper. His reign was marked by external disaster and internal rebellion. These include the First Opium War and the beginning of the Taiping Rebellion which nearly brought down the dynasty. The historian Jonathan Spence characterizes the Daoguang Emperor as a well meaning but ineffective man who promoted officials who presented a purist view even if they had nothing to say about the domestic and foreign problems surrounding the dynasty.

== Early years ==
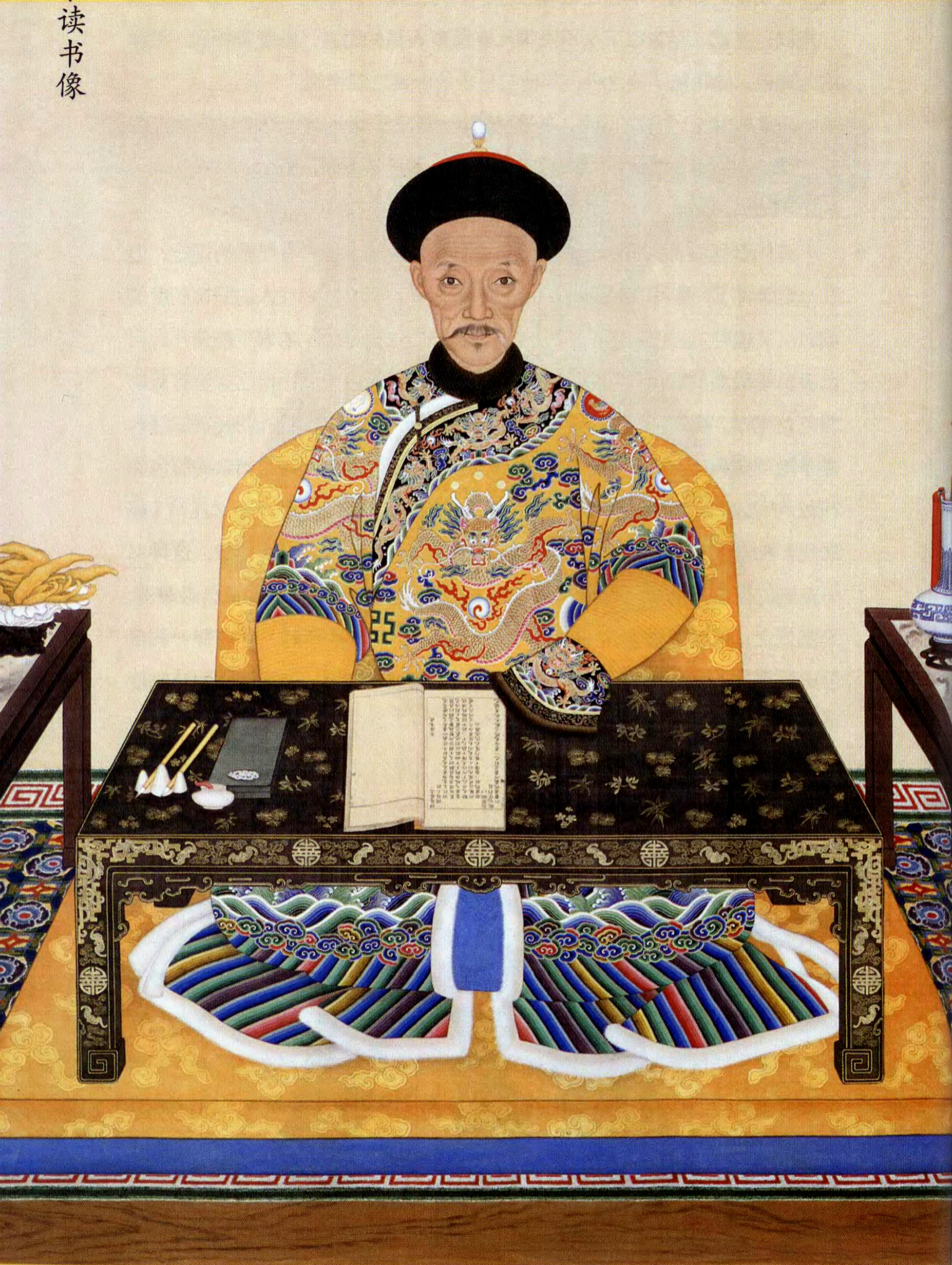
The Daoguang Emperor in his study

The Daoguang Emperor was born in the Forbidden City, Beijing, in 1782, and was given the name Mianning (绵宁; 綿寧; Miánníng; Mien-ning). It was later changed to Minning (旻宁; 旻寧; Mǐnníng; Min-ning) when he became emperor. The first character of his private name was changed from Mian to Min to avoid the relatively common character Mian. This novelty was introduced by his grandfather, the reigning Qianlong Emperor, who thought it was inappropriate to use a common character in the emperor's private name due to the longstanding practice of naming taboo.

Mianning was the second son of Prince Yongyan, the 15th son and heir of the Qianlong Emperor. Even though he was Yongyan's second son, he was first in line after Prince Yongyan to his grandfather's throne. This was because according to the dishu system, his mother, Lady Hitara, was Yongyan's primary spouse whereas his elder brother was born to Yongyan's concubine. Mianning was favored by his grandfather, the Qianlong Emperor. He frequently accompanied his grandfather on hunting trips. On one such trip, at the age of nine, Mianning successfully hunted a deer, which greatly amused the Qianlong Emperor. The emperor would abdicate five years after that incident, in 1796, when Mianning was 14. Mianning’s father Prince Yongyan was then enthroned as the Jiaqing Emperor, after which he made Lady Hitara (Mianning's mother) his empress consort. The elderly Qianlong would live three more years in retirement before dying in 1799, aged 87, when Mianning was 17.

In 1813, while he was still a prince, Mianning also played a vital role in repelling and killing Eight Trigrams invaders who stormed the Forbidden City.

== Reign ==
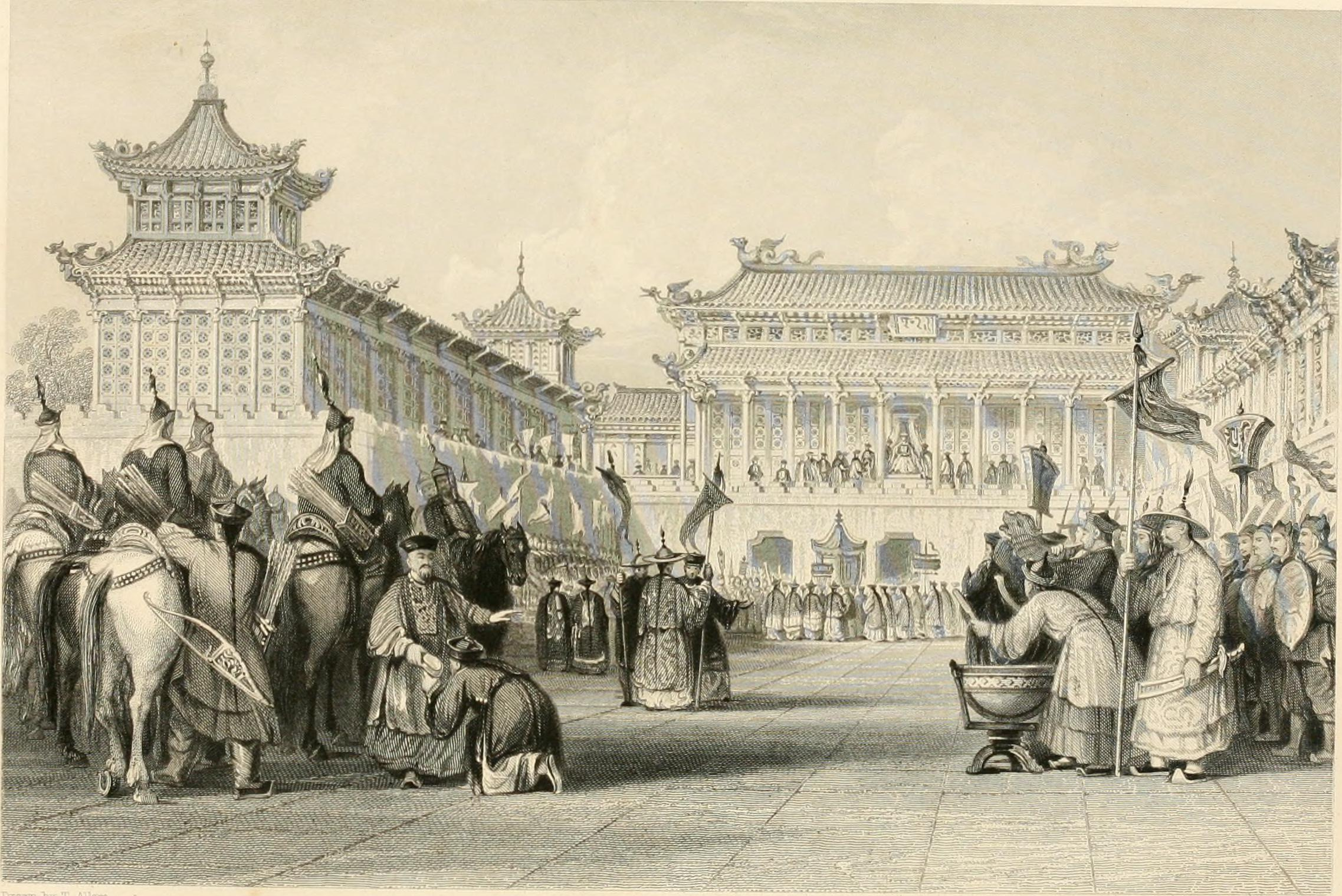
The Daoguang Emperor inspecting his guards at the Meridian Gate of the Forbidden City

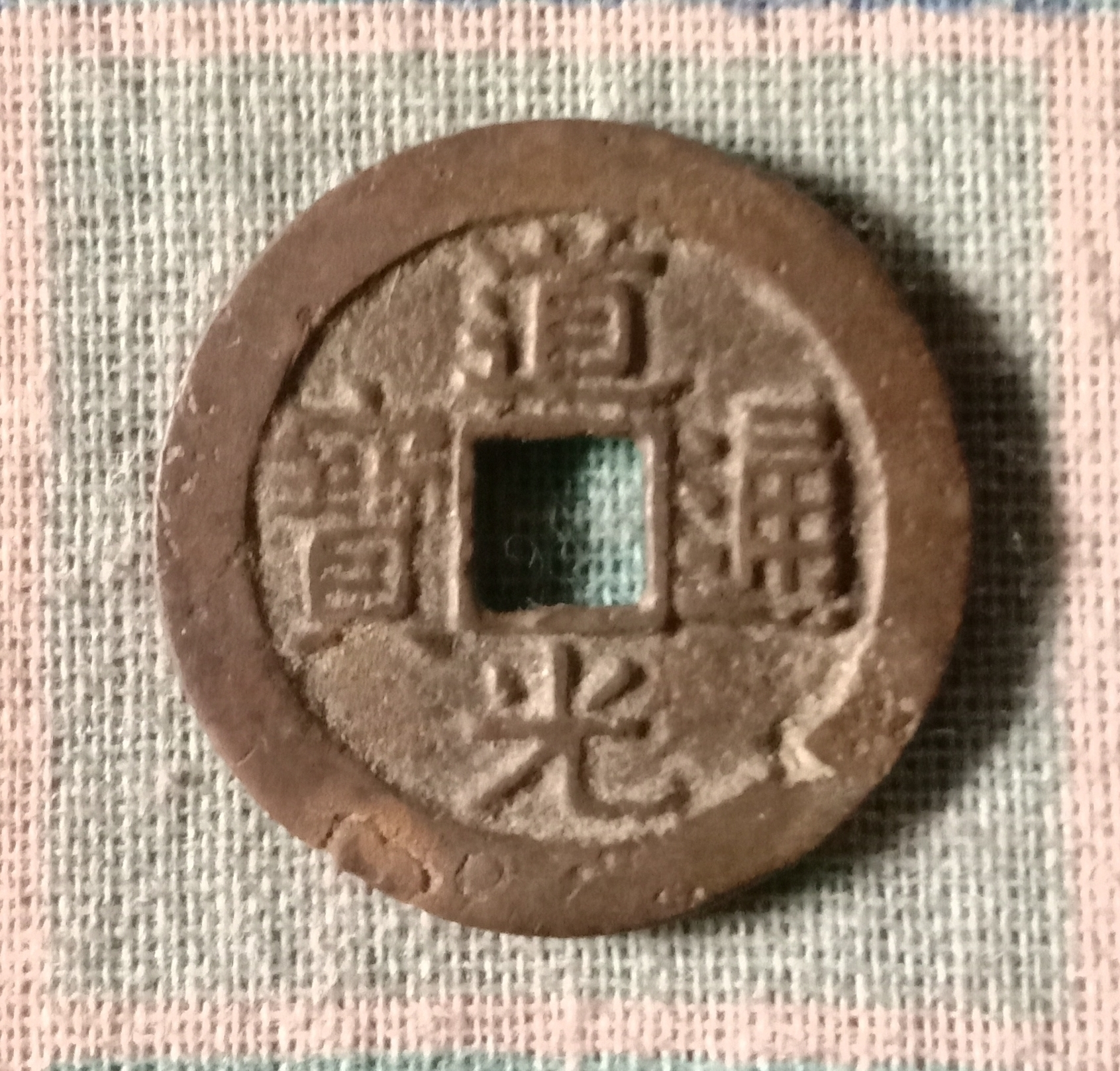
One Cash coin struck in the name of Daoguang, emperor of the Qing dynasty, minted in Boo-guwang.

=== Khoja rebellion in Xinjiang ===
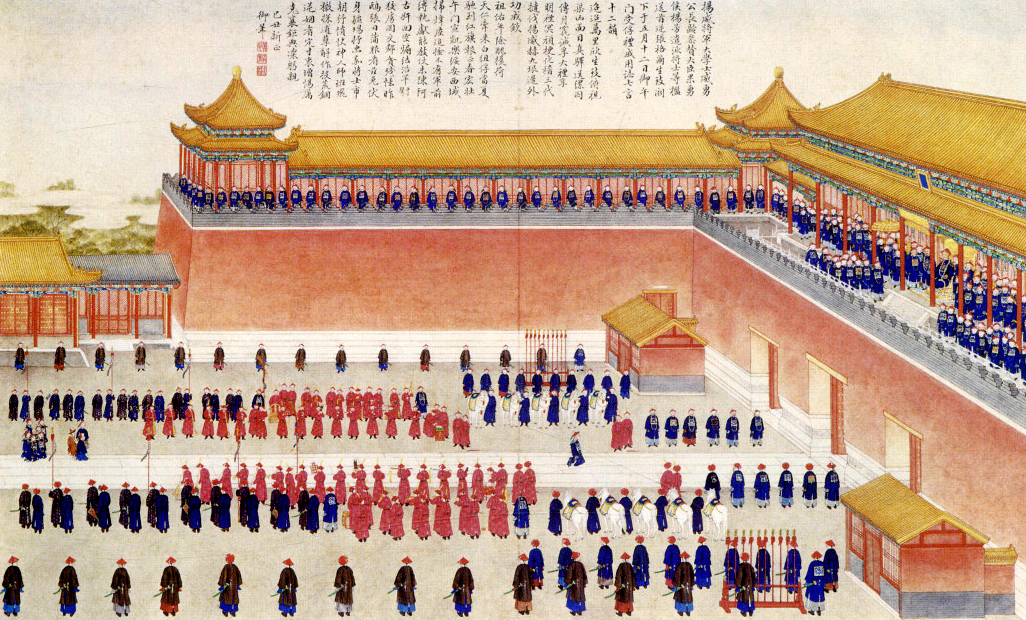
The Daoguang Emperor is presented with prisoners of the campaign to pacify rebels in Xinjiang at the Meridian Gate in 1828

In September 1820, at the age of 38, Mianning inherited the throne after the Jiaqing Emperor died suddenly of unknown causes. He became the first Qing emperor who was the eldest legitimate son of his father. Now known as the Daoguang Emperor, he inherited a declining empire with Westerners encroaching upon the borders of China. His era name, "Daoguang", means "radiant path". The Daoguang Emperor had been ruling for six years when the exiled heir to the Khojas, Jahangir Khoja, attacked Xinjiang from Kokand in the Afaqi Khoja revolts. By the end of 1826, the former Qing cities of Kashgar, Yarkand, Khotan, and Yangihissar had all fallen to the rebels. After a friend betrayed him in March 1827, Khoja was sent to Beijing in an iron litter and subsequently executed, while the Qing Empire regained control of their lost territory. The Uyghur Muslim Sayyid and Naqshbandi Sufi rebel of the Afaqi suborder, Jahangir Khoja was sliced to death (Lingchi) in 1828 by the Manchus for leading a rebellion against the Qing.

=== First Opium War ===
During the Daoguang Emperor's reign, China experienced major problems with opium, which was imported into China by British merchants. Opium had started to trickle into China during the reign of the Yongzheng Emperor, but was limited to approximately 200 chests annually. By the time of the Qianlong era, this amount had increased to 1,000 chests, 4,000 chests by the Jiaqing era and more than 30,000 chests during the Daoguang era.

Destruction of Chinese war junks during the First Opium War

The Daoguang Emperor issued many imperial edicts banning opium in the 1820s and 1830s, which were carried out by Lin Zexu, whom he appointed as an Imperial Commissioner to Canton. Lin Zexu's efforts to halt the spread of opium in China led directly to the First Opium War. With China losing the war, Manchu official Qishan was made a scapegoat. The Daoguang Emperor removed his authority and banished him to Tibet. During the war, the Daoguang Emperor ordered 187 British and Indian prisoners of war held captive in Taiwan Prefecture to be summarily executed in 1842 in retaliation for the Chinese defeat at the Battle of Ningpo; the executions were carried out on 10 August by Chinese officials. The Chinese defeat in the war exposed Qing China's technological and military inferiority to European powers, which led China in being forced to cede Hong Kong to the British in the Treaty of Nanjing in August 1842, and also pay a hefty indemnity which left the treasury desperate for funds. Meanwhile, in the Himalayas, the Sikh Empire attempted an occupation of Tibet but was defeated in the Sino-Sikh war (1841–1842).

=== Anti-Christianity ===
In 1811, a clause sentencing Europeans to death for spreading Catholicism had been added to the statute called "Prohibitions Concerning Sorcerers and Sorceresses" (禁止師巫邪術) in the Great Qing Legal Code. Protestants hoped that the Qing government would discriminate between Protestantism and Catholicism, since the law mentioned the latter by name, but after Protestant missionaries gave Christian books to Chinese people in 1835 and 1836, the Daoguang Emperor demanded to know who were the "traitorous natives" in Guangzhou who had supplied them with books.

=== Noble titles ===
The Daoguang Emperor granted the title of "Wujing Boshi" (五經博士; Wǔjīng Bóshì) to the descendants of Ran Qiu.

== Death and legacy ==
The Daoguang Emperor died on 26 February 1850 at the Old Summer Palace, 8 km/5 miles northwest of Beijing, being the last Qing emperor to pass away in that Palace before it was burnt down by Anglo-French troops during the Second Opium War, a decade later. He was succeeded by his eldest surviving son, Yizhu, who was later enthroned as the Xianfeng Emperor. The Daoguang Emperor failed to understand the intention or determination of the Europeans, or the basic economics of a war on drugs. Although the Europeans were outnumbered and thousands of miles away from logistical support in their native countries, they could bring far superior firepower to bear at any point of contact along the Chinese coast. The Qing government was highly dependent on the continued flow of taxes from southern China via the Grand Canal, which the British expeditionary force easily cut off at Zhenjiang.

The Daoguang Emperor ultimately had a poor understanding of the British and the Industrial Revolution that Britain and Western Europe had undergone, preferring to turn a blind eye to the rest of the world, though the distance from China to Europe most likely played a part. It was said that the emperor did not even know where Britain was located in the world. His 30-year reign saw rising economic tensions, sectarian instability and foreign interventions which would eventually lead to the collapse of the Qing dynasty in 1911.

The Daoguang Emperor was interred in the Mu (慕; lit. "Longing" or "Admiration") mausoleum complex, which is part of the Western Qing Tombs, 120 kilometres (75 mi) southwest of Beijing.

== Family ==
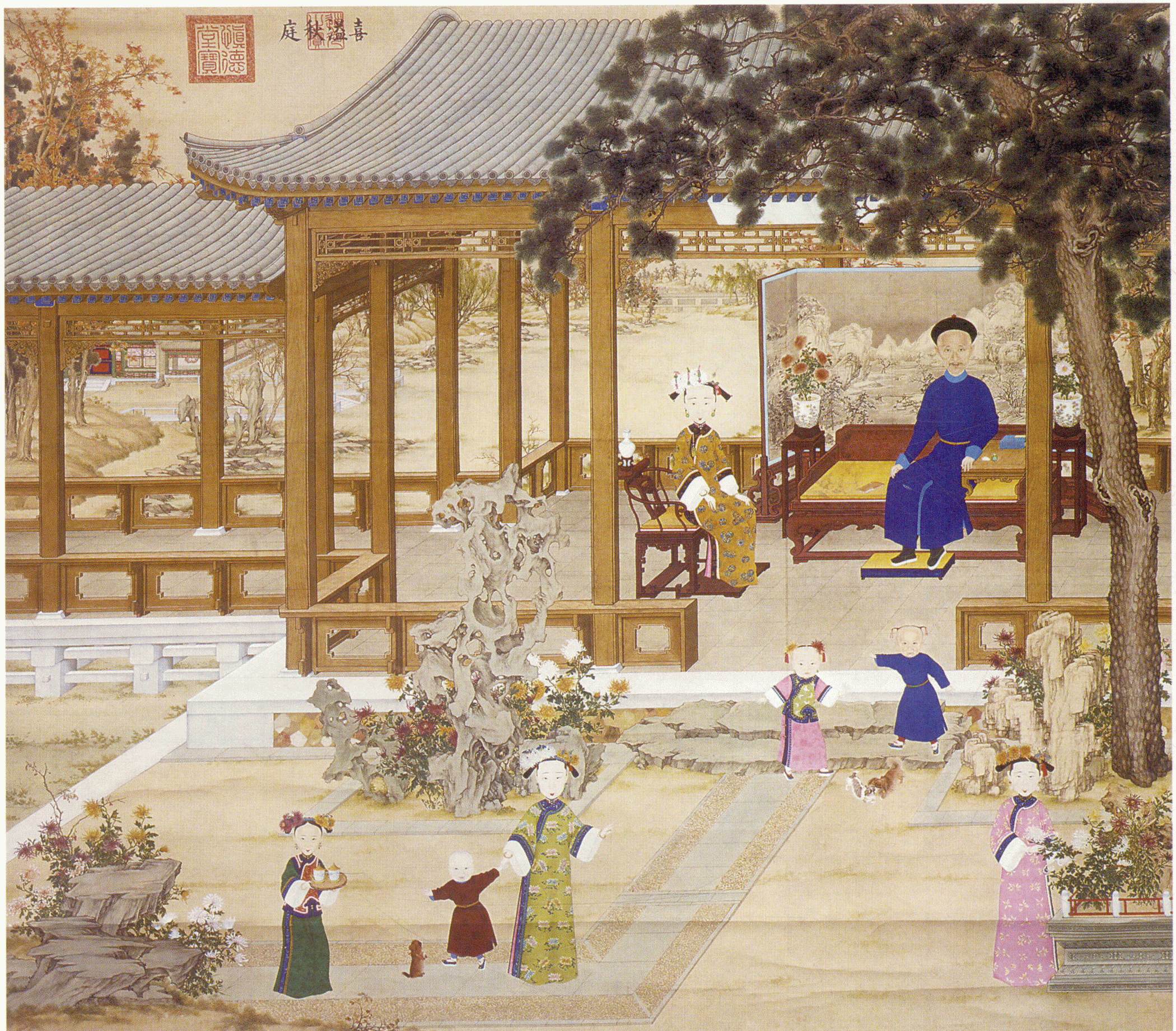
From top to bottom, left to right: Empress Xiaoquancheng, the Daoguang Emperor, Princess Shou'an, Yizhu, a lady-in-waiting, Yixin, Noble Consort Jing and Noble Consort Tong (c. 1837)

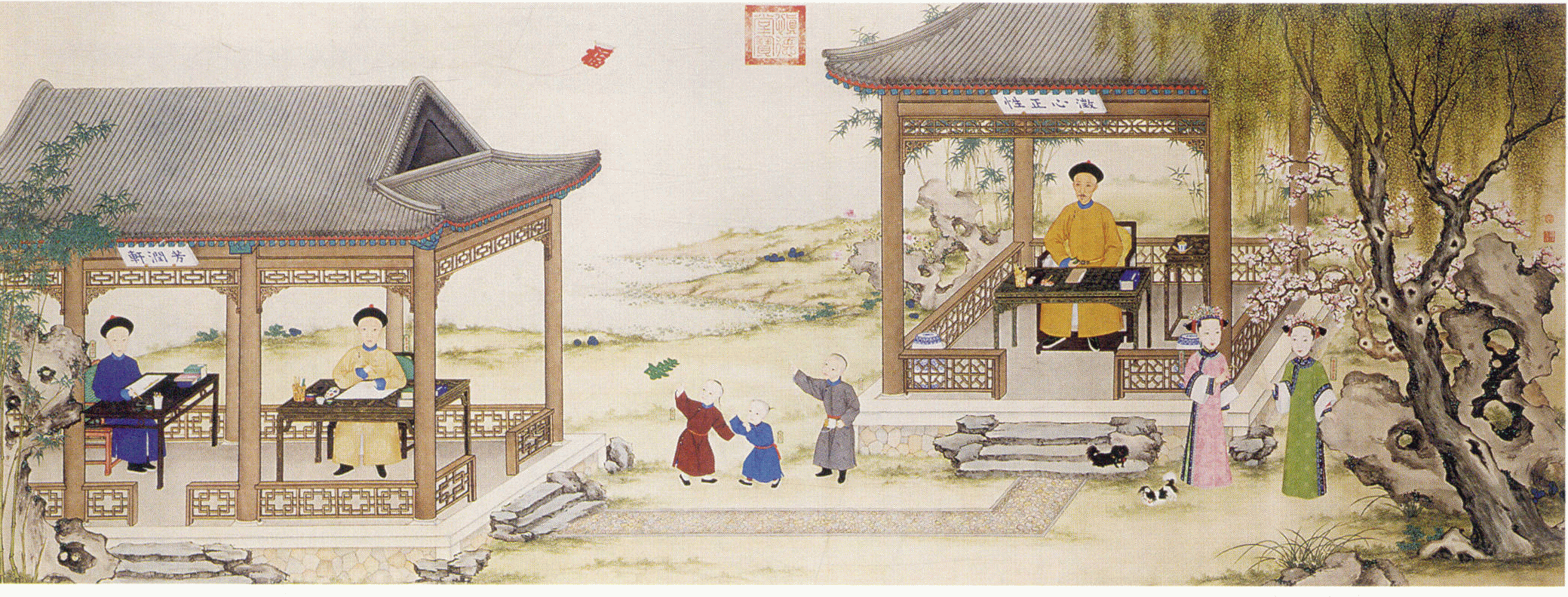
From left to right: Yixin, Yizhu, Yihe, Yihui, Yixuan, the Daoguang Emperor, Princess Shou'an and Princess Shou'en (c. 1848)

- Empress Xiaomucheng (孝穆成皇后), of the Niohuru clan (鈕祜祿氏; 1781 – 17 February 1808)
- Empress Xiaoshencheng (孝慎成皇后), of the Tunggiya clan (佟佳氏; 5 July 1792 – 16 June 1833)
  - Princess Duanmin of the First Rank (端憫固倫公主; 29 July 1813 – 7 December 1819), first daughter
- Empress Xiaoquancheng (孝全成皇后), of the Niohuru clan (鈕祜祿氏; 24 March 1808 – 13 February 1840)
  - Miscarriage (2 January 1824)
  - Princess Duanshun of the First Rank (端順固倫公主; 8 April 1825 – 27 December 1835), third daughter
  - Princess Shou'an of the First Rank (壽安固倫公主; 12 May 1826 – 24 March 1860), fourth daughter
    - Married Demchüghjab (德穆楚克扎布; d. 1865), of the Naiman Borjigin clan, on 15 November 1841
  - Yizhu (奕詝), the Xianfeng Emperor (咸豐帝; 17 July 1831 – 22 August 1861), fourth son
- Empress Xiaojingcheng (孝靜成皇后), of the Khorchin Borjigin clan (博爾濟吉特氏; 19 June 1812 – 21 August 1855)
  - Yigang (奕綱), Prince Shunhe of the Second Rank (順和郡王; 22 November 1826 – 5 March 1827), second son
  - Miscarriage at four months (28 June 1828)
  - Yiji (奕繼), Prince Huizhi of the Second Rank (慧質郡王; 2 December 1829 – 22 January 1830), third son
  - Princess Shou'en of the First Rank (壽恩固倫公主; 20 January 1831 – 15 May 1859), sixth daughter
    - Married Jingshou (景壽; 1829–1889), of the Fuca clan, in May/June 1845, and had issue
  - Yixin (奕䜣), Prince Gongzhong of the First Rank (恭忠親王; 11 January 1833 – 29 May 1898), sixth son
- Imperial Noble Consort Zhuangshun (莊順皇貴妃), of the Uya clan (烏雅氏; 29 November 1822 – 13 December 1866)
  - Yixuan (奕譞), Prince Chunxian of the First Rank (醇賢親王; 16 October 1840 – 1 January 1891), seventh son
  - Princess Shouzhuang of the First Rank (壽莊固倫公主; 24 March 1842 – 11 March 1884), ninth daughter
    - Married Dehui (德徽), of the Bolod clan, in December 1859/January 1860, and had issue (one daughter)
  - Yihe (奕詥), Prince Zhongduan of the Second Rank (鐘端郡王; 14 March 1844 – 17 December 1868), eighth son
  - Yihui (奕譓), Prince Fujing of the Second Rank (孚敬郡王; 15 November 1845 – 22 March 1877), ninth son
  - Miscarriage (1848)
- Noble Consort Tong (彤貴妃), of the Šumuru clan (舒穆魯氏; 3 June 1817 – 9 November 1875)
  - Seventh daughter (30 July 1840 – 27 January 1845)
  - Princess Shouxi of the Second Rank (壽禧和碩公主; 7 January 1842 – 10 September 1866), eighth daughter
    - Married Jalafungga (扎拉豐阿; d. 1898), of the Niohuru clan, in November/December 1863
  - Tenth daughter (4 May 1844 – 26 February 1845)
- Noble Consort Jia (佳貴妃), of the Gogiya clan (郭佳氏; 21 November 1816 – 24 May 1890), personal name Sanniu (三妞)
- Noble Consort Cheng (成貴妃), of the Niohuru clan (鈕祜祿氏; 10 March 1813 – 10 May 1888)
- Consort He (和妃), of the Hoifa-Nara clan (輝發那拉氏; d. 18 May 1836)
  - Yiwei (奕緯), Prince Yinzhi of the Second Rank (隱志郡王; 16 May 1808 – 23 May 1831), first son
- Consort Xiang (祥妃), of the Niohuru clan (鈕祜祿氏; 9 February 1808 – 15 February 1861)
  - Second daughter (2 March 1825 – 27 August 1825)
  - Princess Shouzang of the Second Rank (壽臧和碩公主; 15 November 1829 – 9 August 1856), fifth daughter
    - Married Enchong (恩崇; d. 1864), of the Namdulu clan, on 3 January 1843
  - Yicong (奕誴), Prince Dunqin of the First Rank (惇勤親王; 23 July 1831 – 18 February 1889), fifth son
- Consort Chang (常妃), of the Hešeri clan (赫舍里氏; 31 December 1808 – 10 May 1860)
- Concubine Tian (恬嬪), of the Fuca clan (富察氏; 15 April 1789 – 21 August 1845)
- Concubine Shun (順嬪), of the Hoifa-Nara clan (那拉氏; 21 March 1809 – 11 April 1868)
- Concubine Yu (豫嬪), of the Shang clan (尚氏; 20 December 1816 – 24 September 1897)
- Concubine Heng (恆嬪), of the Cai clan (蔡氏; d. 28 May 1876)
- Noble Lady Ping (平貴人), of the Zhao clan (趙氏; d. 5 May 1823)
- Noble Lady (貴人), of the Li clan (李氏; 25 November 1827 – 26 March 1872)
- Noble Lady Na (那貴人), of the Hoifa-Nara clan (輝發那拉氏; 5 August 1825 – 9 September 1865)
- Noble Lady Ding (定貴人), of the Sun clan (孫氏; d. 24 January 1843)
- Second Class Attendant Mu (睦答應), of the Hešeri clan (赫舍里氏; d. 2 June 1832)
- Lady-in-waiting (官女子), of the Liu clan (劉氏; d. 1843)

== See also ==
- Family tree of Chinese monarchs (late)
- Treaty of Nanjing (1842)

Daoguang Emperor House of Aisin-Gioro Born: 16 September 1782 Died: 26 February 1850
Regnal titles
Preceded by Jiaqing Emperor	Emperor of the Qing dynasty Emperor of China; 1820–1850	Succeeded by Xianfeng Emperor
