= Western Qing tombs =

Necropolis in Hebei Province, China

Western Qing Tombs
UNESCO World Heritage Site
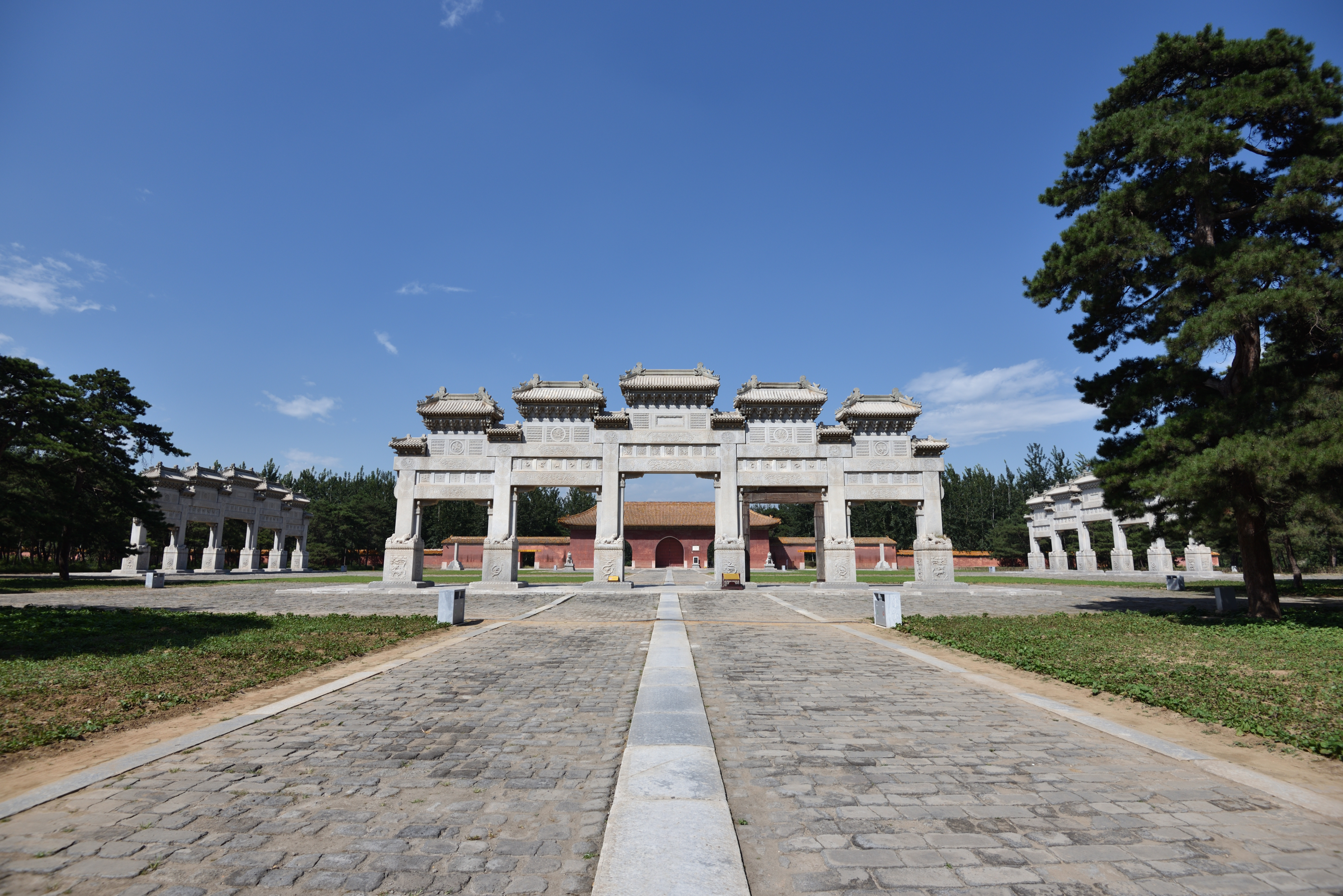
- Paifang at the general gate of Western Qing tombs

- Location within Hebei
- Location: Yi County, Hebei, China
- Part of: Imperial Tombs of the Ming and Qing Dynasties
- Criteria: Cultural: (i)(ii)(iii)(iv)(vi)
- Reference: 1004ter-003
- Inscription: 2000 (24th Session)
- Extensions: 2003, 2004
- Area: 1,842 ha (4,550 acres)
- Buffer zone: 4,758 ha (11,760 acres)
- Website: http://ly.qingxiling.com/
- Coordinates: 39°22′06″N 115°20′43″E

The Western Qing tombs (Chinese: 清西陵; pinyin: Qīng Xī líng; Manchu: ᠸᠠᡵᡤᡳ
ᡝᡵᡤᡳ
ᠮᡠᠩᡤᠠᠨ, romanized: wargi ergi munggan) are located some 140 km (87 mi) southwest of Beijing in Yi County, Hebei Province. They constitute a necropolis that incorporates four royal mausoleums where seventy-eight royal members are buried. These include four emperors of the Qing dynasty and their empresses, imperial concubines, princes and princesses, as well as other royal servants.

== History ==
Construction of the Western Qing tombs was initiated by the Yongzheng Emperor who broke with tradition and refused to be buried in the Eastern Qing tombs. Some have speculated, though not proven, that as Yongzheng had illegally usurped the throne by eliminating his brothers, his motive to relocate his tomb to the Western Qing tombs was that he did not wish to be buried alongside his father the Kangxi Emperor. Later on his son, the Qianlong Emperor, decided that he should be buried in the Eastern Qing tombs and dictated that thereafter burials should alternate between the eastern and western sites, although this was not followed consistently.

The first tomb, the Tailing, was completed in 1737, two years after the end of the Yongzheng reign. The last imperial interment was in 1913, when the Guangxu Emperor was entombed in the Chongling (崇陵). Chongling was looted by grave robbers in 1938, and its burial chamber is now open to the public.

== Main tombs ==
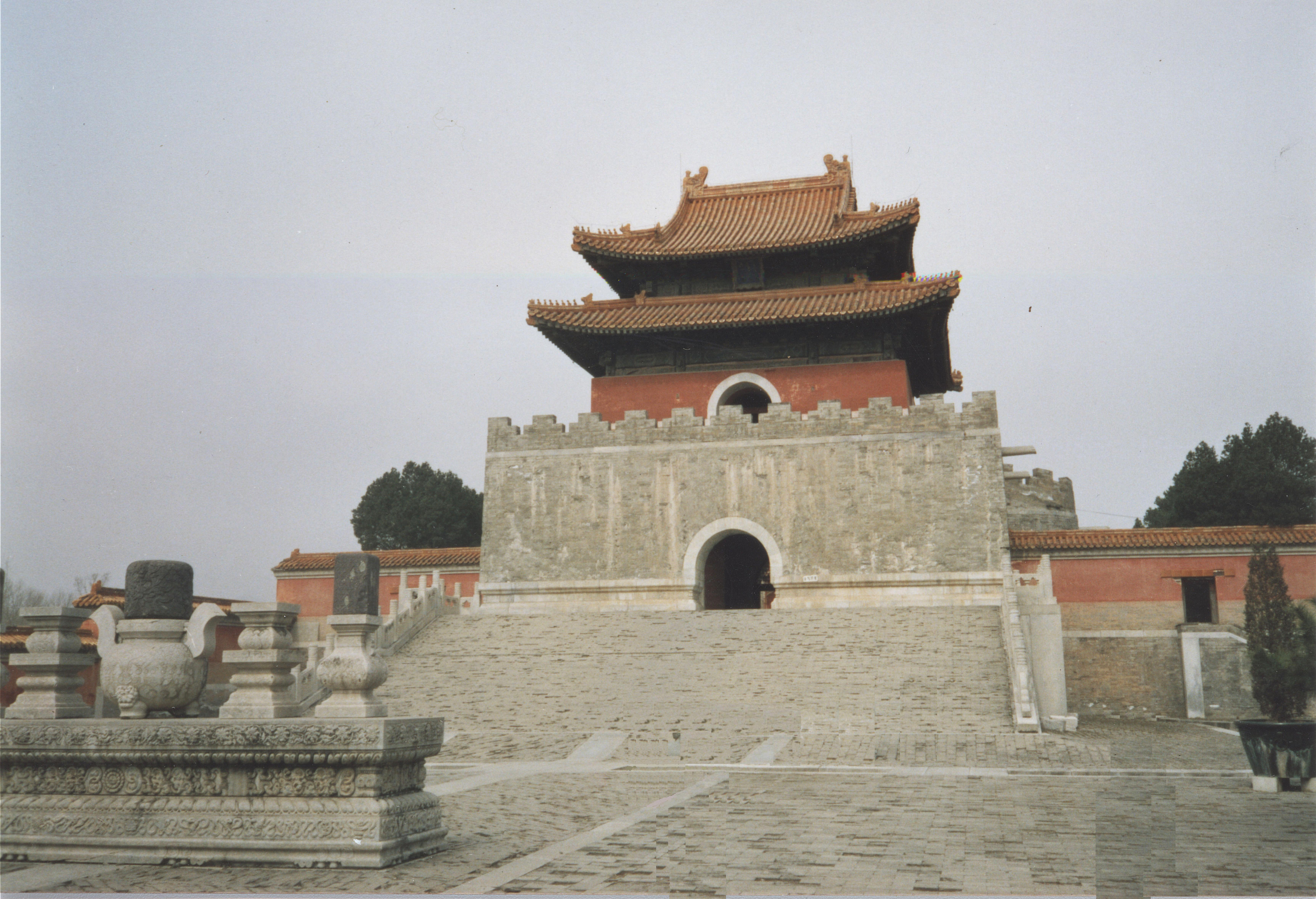
Chongling, mausoleum of the Guangxu Emperor

The four tombs in Western Qing Tombs are:

- Tailing (Chinese: 泰陵; pinyin: Tàilíng; lit. 'Tomb of the Peaceful'; Manchu: elhe munggan)
  - For the Yongzheng Emperor (1678–1735, the 3rd emperor)
- Changling (Chinese: 昌陵; pinyin: Chānglíng; lit. 'Tomb of the Remarkable'; Manchu: colgoroko munggan)
  - For the Jiaqing Emperor (1760–1820, the 5th emperor)
- Muling (Chinese: 慕陵; pinyin: Mùlíng; lit. 'Tomb of the Knowledgeable'; Manchu: gūnihangga munggan)
  - For the Daoguang Emperor (1782–1850, the 6th emperor)
- Chongling (Chinese: 崇陵; pinyin: Chónglíng; lit. 'Tomb of the Sublime'; Manchu: wesihun munggan)
  - For the Guangxu Emperor (1871–1908, the 9th emperor)
  - Empress Dowager Longyu (1868-1913) was also buried in the tomb
  - The tomb was looted in 1938, ten years after the looting of the Eastern Mausoleum

The Xuantong Emperor is buried in a commercial cemetery behind the Guangxu Emperor's tomb. While not officially part of the Western Qing Tombs, including Puyi would bring the number of emperors at the Western Tombs to five, the same number as those buried at the Eastern Tombs.

== See also ==
- Eastern Qing tombs
- Imperial Tombs of the Ming and Qing Dynasties
