= Uya =

Manchu clan and family name

Chinese name
- Chinese: 乌雅氏
Transcriptions
Standard Mandarin
- Hanyu Pinyin: wū yǎ shì

Manchu name
- Manchu script: ᡠᠶᠠ
- Möllendorff: Uya

Pronunciation respelling name
- Pronunciation respelling: WOO-yah

Uya is a Manchu clan and family name.

== Notable figures ==
=== Males ===
- Ebaigen (额栢根)
  - Esen (額森/额森)
    - Weiwu (威武/威武) – a third rank military official (護軍參領/护军参领, pinyin: hujun canling), and held the title of a first class duke (一等公)
    - Yuese (岳色)
- Bailu (白绿), the grandfather of Imperial Noble Consort Zhuangshun
  - Lingshou (靈壽/灵寿; 1788–1824), served as a sixth rank literary official (筆帖式/笔帖式, pinyin: bitieshi)
  - Wanming (万明), served as a second rank literary official.

Prince Consort

Date	Prince Consort	Background	Princess
1772	Jalantai (札蘭泰/札兰泰; d. 1788)		Princess Heke (1758–1780), the Qianlong Emperor's ninth daughter by Empress Xiaoyichun (Weigiya)

=== Females ===
Imperial Consort

- Empress
  - Malu, Empress Xiaogongren (1660–1723), the Kangxi Emperor's consort, the mother of the Yongzheng Emperor (1678–1735), Yinzuo (1680–1685), seventh daughter (1682), Princess Wenxian (1683–1702), 12th daughter (1686–1697) and Yunti (1688–1755)
- Imperial Noble Consort
  - Imperial Noble Consort Zhuangshun (1822–1866), the Daoguang Emperor's noble consort, the mother of Yixuan (1840–1891), Princess Shouzhuang (1842–1844), Yihe (1844–1868) and Yihui (1845–1877)
- Imperial Concubine
  - Imperial Concubine En (1791–1847), the Jiaqing Emperor's noble lady

Princess Consort

- Primary Consort
  - Yunhu's second primary consort, the mother of Hongsong (1743–1777) and Hongfeng (1744–1803)
  - Yunbi's primary consort, the mother of first daughter (1734–1736), Princess (1735–1753), third daughter (1737–1745), Hongchang (1741–1795), fifth daughter (1742–1743), Princess (b. 1743) and Princess (b. 1745)
- Concubine
  - Yunzhi's concubine, the mother of Lady (1703–1768) and tenth son (1716–1720)

== Family tree ==
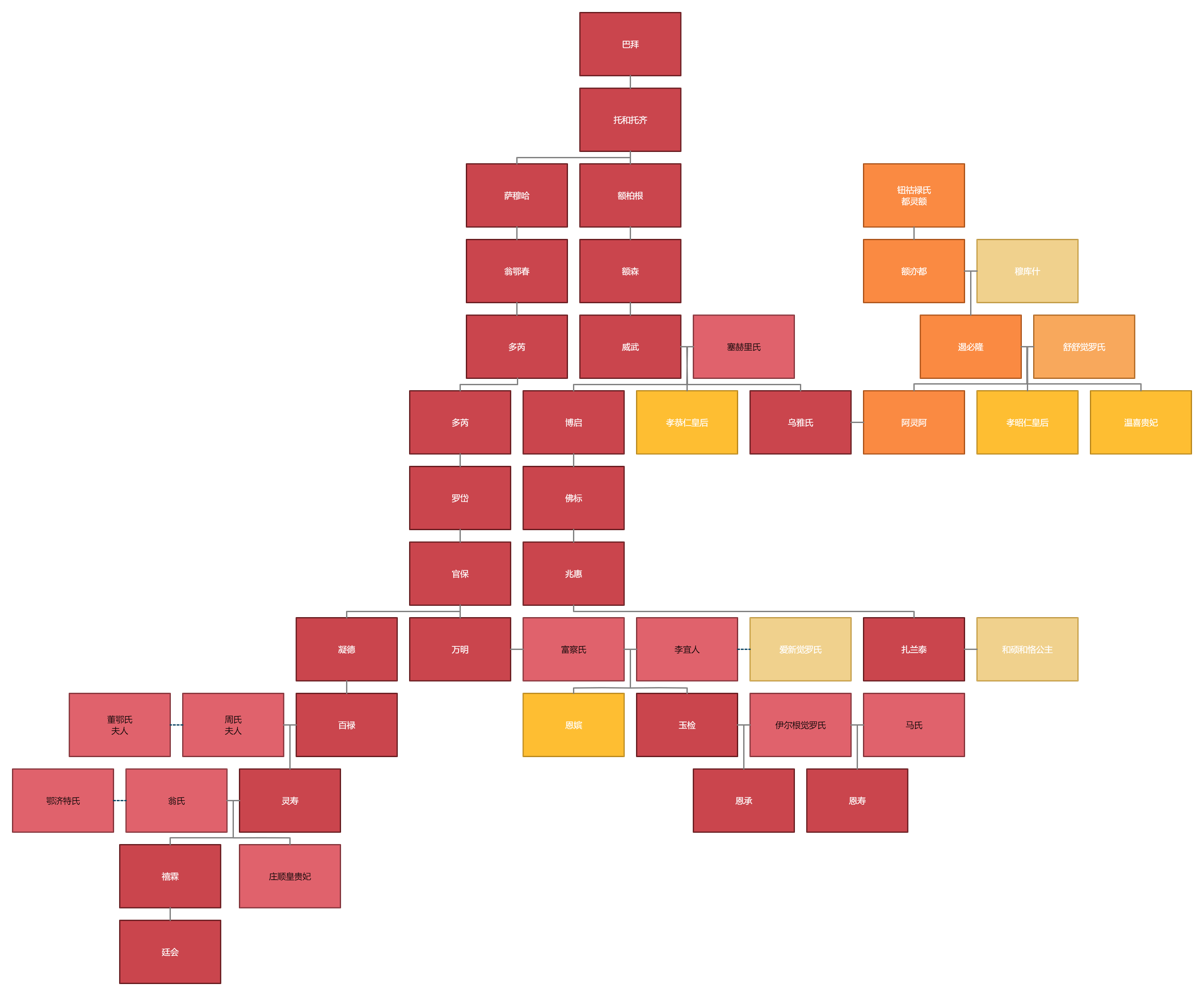
Family tree of the Uya clan

== See also ==
- List of Manchu clans
