= Prince Zhi =

Prince Zhi may refer to either of the following:

- Prince Shen (慎郡王), a Qing dynasty princely peerage created in 1735, renamed to Prince Zhi (質郡王) in 1772
- Prince Zhi (直) (直郡王), a Qing dynasty princely peerage created in 1698
  - Yunzhi, Prince Zhi, the first Prince Zhi in this peerage
- The Daoguang Emperor of the Qing dynasty, known as Prince Zhi (智親王) before his coronation in 1820
