= Ligiya Daniu =

- Secondary princess consort Chunxian of the First Rank
- Born: 1869
- Died: 1928 (aged 58–59)
- Burial: Tomb of the Prince Chun, Beijing
- Spouse: Yixuan, Prince Chun
- Issue: Third daughter
Names
- Ligiya Daniu 李佳•大妞
- Father: Dechun

Lady Ligiya (侧福晋李佳氏; 1869–1928) was a secondary consort of Prince Chunxian of the First Rank and Daoguang Emperor's seventh son, Yixuan. Her personal name was Daniu (大妞).

== Life ==
=== Family background ===
Lady Ligiya was a booi aha of the Plain White Banner.

Father: Dechun (德纯), a baitangga

=== Tongzhi era ===
Ligiya Daniu was born in 1869, which translates to the eighth year of Tongzhi era.

=== Guangxu era ===
In 1885, Daniu was working as the servant in the teahouse of the Palace of Eternal Spring, a residence of Empress Dowager Cixi. On 23 November 1887, she gave birth to Yixuan's third daughter and was granted a title of mistress. However, Puyi's biography doesn't provide sufficient description of her as another secondary consort of prince Chun. Upon the marriage of her sole daughter to first class Zhongyong duke Songchun (松春) in 1905, Daniu was promoted to secondary consort while her daughter was granted a title of Lady of the First Rank.

After husband's death she managed the affairs of the princely manor together with Cuiyan. She was only second to Cuiyan in precedence as she was the latest promoted princess consort. At that time, a personnel of the manor was estimated as 100 people. Daniu often appeared on photographs of the Prince Chun's family, unlike Lady Yanzha who was a chosen maid at that time. On the most photographs, she sat on the right from higher-ranked princesses consorts. While being photographed with stepchildren, it were her stepchildren who stood around her.

=== Republican era ===
In 1921, when Cuiyan and Zaifeng's primary consort Youlan were summoned by Imperial Noble Consort Dowager Duankang to the palace to be reprimanded for Puyi's misconduct (Puyi was furious about dismission of imperial doctor Fan Yimei who had treated Imperial Noble Consort Dowager Duankang), Daniu left in the manor. The conflict was resolved but Youlan committed suicide by swallowing opium.

Even after eviction of Puyi from the Forbidden City in 1924 family of Prince Chun kept their residence, unlike another imperial princes whose residences were acquired by warlords.

After the death of Cuiyan, Lady Ligiya continued management of the Prince Chun Mansion. Lady Ligiya died in 1928 having been 59 years old and was interred at the tomb of the Prince Chun alongside Lady Liugiya.
