= Yunti =

Yunti or Yinti may refer to either of the following Qing dynasty princes:

- Yinzhi, Prince Zhi (1672–1734), whose name is sometimes romanised as Yinti, the Kangxi Emperor's eldest son
- Yunti, Prince Xun (1688–1756), also known as Yinti, the Kangxi Emperor's 14th son
