= Yihui =

- Prince Fu of the Second Rank 多羅孚郡王

Head of the House of Prince Fu peerage
- Tenure: 1850–1877
- Predecessor: peerage created
- Successor: Zaipei
- Born: Yihui (奕譓); 15 November 1845
- Died: 22 March 1877 (aged 31)
Posthumous name
- Prince Fujing of the Second Rank (孚敬郡王)
- House: Aisin Gioro
- Father: Daoguang Emperor
- Mother: Imperial Noble Consort Zhuangshun

Yihui (奕譓; 15 November 1845 – 22 March 1877) was the Daoguang Emperor's ninth son and the first holder of the Prince Fu of the Second Rank title. As the peerage was not granted iron-cap status, his successors would hold diminished ranks. Prince Fu peerage was among the last Qing dynasty princely peerages.

== Life ==
Yihui was born on 18 November 1845 to Imperial Noble Consort Zhuangshun in the Forbidden city. Yihui had two elder brothers, Yixuan and Yihe. In 1850, Yihui was granted a title of Prince Fu of the Second Rank and ordered to study in the Imperial Study. His tutors were professors in the Hanlin academy He Guizhen (何桂珍), Hong Baolian (洪宝莲), Yin Zhaoyong (殷兆镛) and Lu Chaorui (吕朝瑞).

Yihui's ultimate political career started after the Xinyou coup when 8 regents of the Tongzhi Emperor were ousted in coup. Yihui was rewarded for his contribution in deposition of the regents by organising research of the residences of Prince Zheng, Duanhua and Prince Yi, Zaiyuan. The reward consisted of one fox fur coat. The confiscated manor of Zaiyuan was reconstructed to befit the standards of the residence of Prince of the Second Rank and given to Yihui and his potential descendants.

In 1872, Yihui was granted a status of Prince of the First Rank which entitled him to receive privileges similar to Prince of the First Rank though nominally remaining Prince of the Second Rank. In 1874, he was granted yellow horse-riding jacket and appointed as a commander of Han forces of the Plain Blue Banner. In 1875, while Yihui supervised Gioro family school of the Plain Blue Banner, the vice director of Gioro Family School discovered several inflictions, largely related to deception in meddling the affairs and requested Imperial Clan Court to resolve the matter

=== Succession crisis ===
Yihui died on 22 March 1877 and was posthumously honoured as Prince Fu Jing of the Second Rank (孚敬郡王). As Yihui remained childless, there were two princes subsequently adopted as his successors. Yihui was firstly succeeded by Zaipei (载沛), member of Prince Yu of the Second Rank peerage in 1877. After the premature death of Zaipei in 1879, Zaishu (载澍), member of Prince Zhi of the Second Rank peerage, succeeded Yihui as Prince of the Third Rank. After Zaishu's death, Pujin (溥伒), grandson of Yicong by Prince Gongke of the Third Rank Zaiying, was adopted as Yihui's grandson and succeeded Zaishu as Prince of the Fourth Rank.

== Family ==
Yihui was hesitating for marriage that's why he married lady Saimile, daughter of consort Jinglin (景林) only after 1867.

Consorts:

- Primary consort, of the Saimile clan (嫡福晋 赛密勒氏, d.1906)

Issue:

1.Adopted son: Prince of the Third Rank Zaipei (载沛;1872–1879), alias Zaihuang (载煌).

2.Adopted son: Zaishu (载澍; 1870–1909), born as Zaiji (载辑). Stripped of his title in 1897 and confined to Imperial Clan Court in 1901 without the right to return to the manor.

== Family tree ==
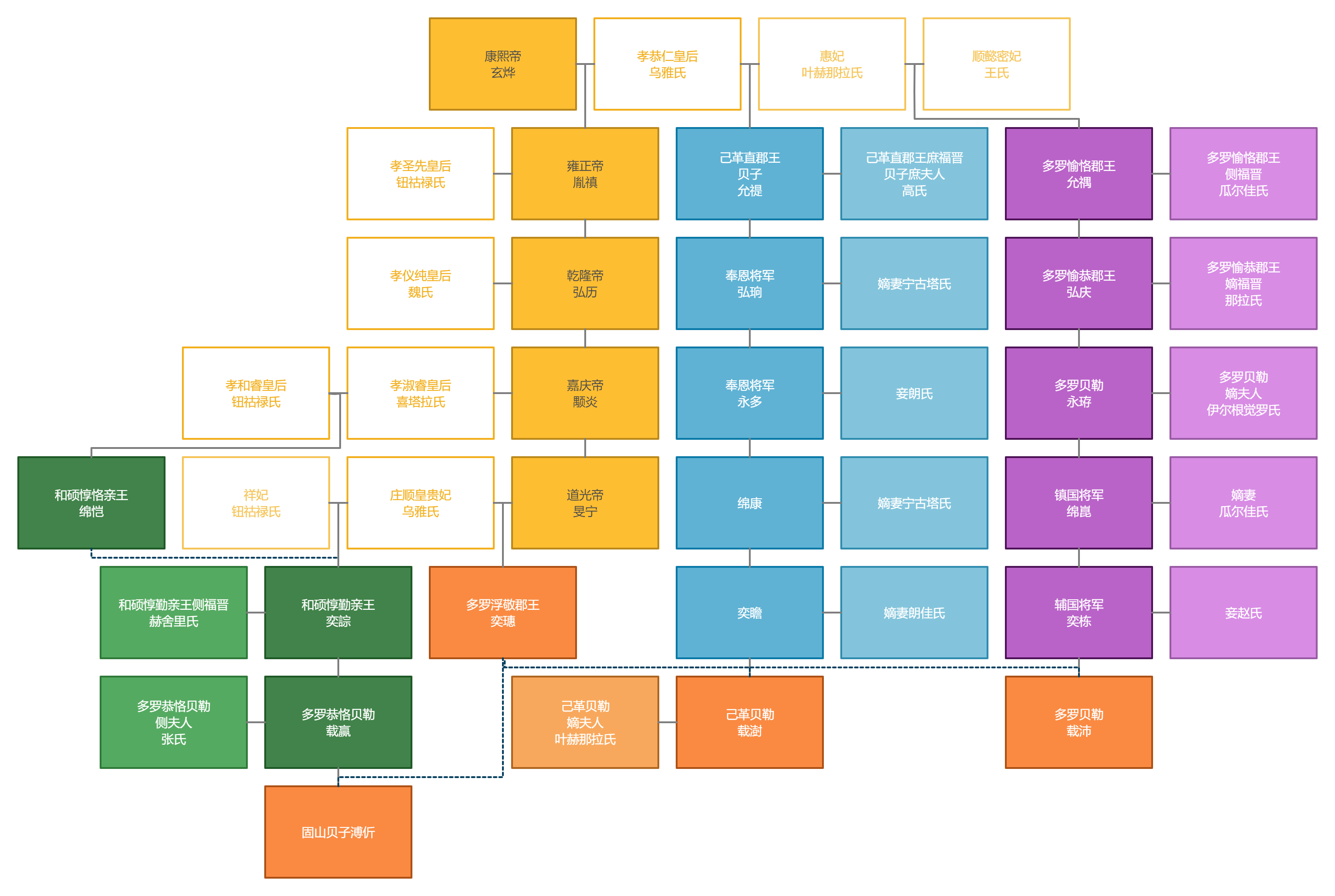
Family tree of the Prince Fu of the Second Rank peerage
