= Prince Yu =

Prince Yu may refer to:

- Duke Huai of Jin, a ruler of the state of Jin in the Spring and Autumn period, known as Crown Prince Yu (太子圉) before he became Duke
- Prince Yu (豫) (豫親王), a Qing dynasty princely peerage created in 1636
- Prince Yu (裕) (裕親王), a Qing dynasty princely peerage created in 1667
- Prince Yu (愉) (愉郡王), a Qing dynasty princely peerage created in 1730
