= Weng Tonghe =

19th-century Qing-dynasty scholar and imperial tutor

Imperial tutor Weng Tonghe
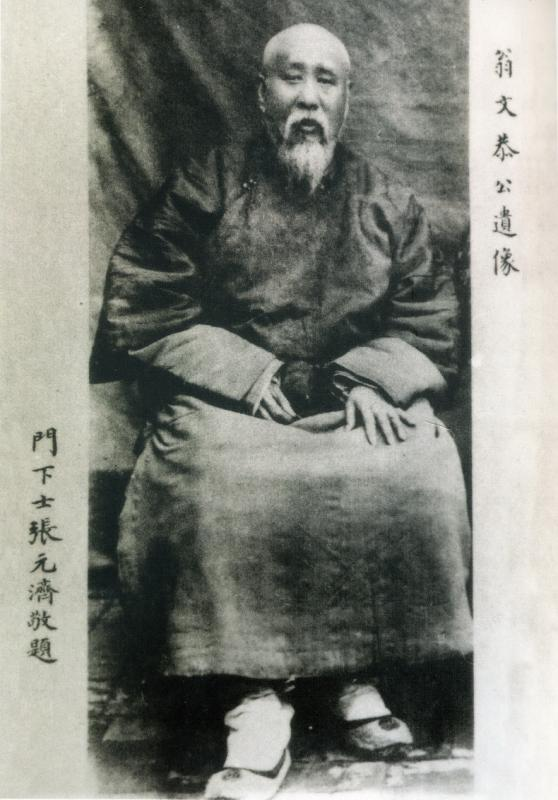

Grand Councilor
- In office 13 November 1894 – 15 June 1898
- In office 14 December 1882 – 8 April 1884

Assistant Grand Secretary
- In office 10 September 1897 – 15 June 1898

Minister of Revenue
- In office 3 January 1886 – 15 June 1898 Serving with Fukun (until 1892), Xijing (1892–1895), Jingxin (since 1895)
- Preceded by: Yan Jingming
- Succeeded by: Wang Wenshao

Minister of Works
- In office 18 June 1879 – 3 January 1886 Serving with Quanqing (until 1880), Ruilian (1880–1883), Linshu (1883–1884), Fukun (since 1884)
- Preceded by: Pan Zuyin
- Succeeded by: Pan Zuyin

Minister of Justice
- In office 17 February – 18 June 1879 Serving with Wenyu
- Preceded by: Sang Chunrong
- Succeeded by: Pan Zuyin

Personal details
- Born: 19 May 1830 Changshu, Jiangsu, Qing Empire
- Died: 4 July 1904 (aged 74) Beijing, Qing Empire
- Relations: Weng Tongshu (翁同書; elder brother)
- Parent(s): Weng Xinchun (翁心存; father)
- Education: Jinshi degree in the Imperial Examination
- Occupation: Politician
- Courtesy name: Shuping (叔平)
- Art name: Songchan (松禪)
- Posthumous name: Wengong (文恭)

Weng Tonghe (Chinese: 翁同龢; pinyin: Wēng Tónghé; Wade–Giles: Weng T'ung-ho; 1830–1904), courtesy name Shuping (叔平), was a Chinese Confucian scholar and imperial tutor who lived in the Qing dynasty. In 1856, he obtained the position of zhuangyuan (or top scholar) in the imperial examination and was subsequently admitted to the prestigious Hanlin Academy.

Weng's father, Weng Xincun, was an official who had been persecuted by an influential faction in the Qing imperial court led by Sushun. Weng Xincun was a tutor of the Daoguang Emperor's sons, Yihui and Yihe. However, in 1861, a coup took place, bringing about the deposition of Sushun and his faction, and the new government, led by Prince Gong, Empress Dowager Ci'an and Empress Dowager Cixi, placed the senior Weng to high office.

In 1865, Weng was appointed as a tutor to the Tongzhi Emperor, joining another tutor by the name of Wo Ren, as well as a lecturer to the two empress dowagers. The Tongzhi Emperor formally took over the reins of power from his regents in 1873 but died two years later.

Weng had apparently been exonerated from the disastrous failure of the education of the Tongzhi Emperor, as he was appointed as a tutor to the Tongzhi Emperor's successor, the Guangxu Emperor. As a tutor to the Guangxu Emperor, Weng emphasized the boy-emperor's filial duties to Empress Dowager Cixi, making her an object of fear and reverence for him.

Along with his role as tutor, Weng accrued increased political power, occupying several important posts in the Qing administration, including Vice President and later President of the Board of Revenue, Director of the Censorate and President of the Board of Punishments. He also served on the Grand Council 1882–84 and participated in decisions made in the First Sino-Japanese War.

Weng was also known for being a patron of Kang Youwei, a man whom he began to dissociate with by the spring of 1898, and in light of this connection, it has been argued that Empress Dowager Cixi removed him from office. However, apparently it was the Guangxu Emperor himself who removed Weng from office in June 1898 after they got into a quarrel.

Weng is the great-great-grandfather of Wango Weng (翁萬戈; 1918–2020), a well-known art historian, art collector, calligrapher, film maker and poet, who inherited many of the artistic masterpieces collected by Weng Tonghe, and who has donated many of them to major museums.
