= Yi Hui =

Yi Hui may refer to:

- Yihui (1845–1877), prince of the Qing dynasty
- Prince Imperial Heung (1845–1912), personal name Yi Hui
- Gojong of Korea (1852–1919), personal name Yi Hui
