= Imperial Noble Consort Zhuangshun =

Consort of the Daoguang Emperor (1822–1866)

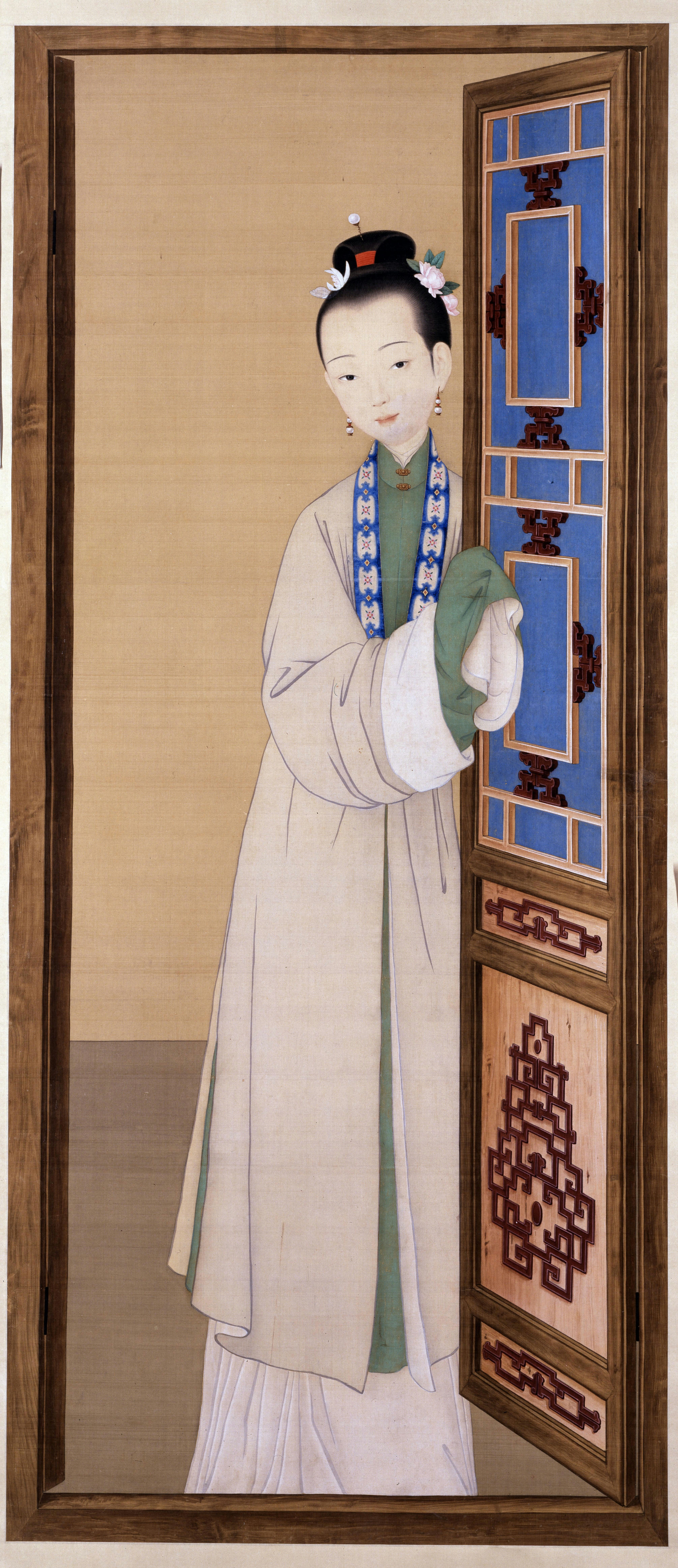
- Qing Dynasty portrait
- Born: 29 November 1822 (道光二年 十月 十六日)
- Died: 13 December 1866 (aged 44) (同治五年 十一月 七日); Forbidden City
- Burial: Mu Mausoleum, Western Qing tombs
- Spouse: Daoguang Emperor (m. 1837; died 1850)
- Issue: Yixuan, Prince Chunxian of the First Rank; Princess Shouzhuang of the First Rank; Yihe, Prince Zhongduan of the Second Rank; Yihui, Prince Fujing of the Second Rank
Posthumous name
- Imperial Noble Consort Zhuangshun (莊順皇貴妃)
- House: Uya (烏雅; by birth); Aisin Gioro (by marriage)

Imperial Noble Consort Zhuangshun
- Traditional Chinese: 莊順皇貴妃
- Simplified Chinese: 庄顺皇贵妃
Transcriptions
Standard Mandarin
- Hanyu Pinyin: Zhuāngshùn Huángguìfēi

Imperial Noble Consort Zhuangshun (29 November 1822 – 13 December 1866), of the Manchu Uya clan, was a consort of the Daoguang Emperor. She was 40 years his junior. She was the paternal grandmother of the Guangxu Emperor and the great grandmother of The Qing Dynasty's last emperor, Puyi through her son, Yixuan.

== Life ==
=== Family background ===
Imperial Noble Consort Zhuangshun's personal name was not recorded in history.

- Father: Lingshou (靈壽; 1788–1824), served as a sixth rank literary official (筆帖式)
  - Paternal grandfather: Bailu (百祿)
  - Paternal grandmother: Lady Zhou (周氏)
- Mother: Lady Weng (翁氏)
- One younger brother: Xilin (禧霖)

=== Daoguang era ===
The future Imperial Noble Consort Zhuangshun was born on the 16th day of the tenth lunar month in the second year of the reign of the Daoguang Emperor, which translates to 29 November 1822 in the Gregorian calendar.

In March or April 1837, Lady Uya entered the Forbidden City and was granted the title "Noble Lady Lin" by the Daoguang Emperor. On 3 December 1837, she was demoted to "First Attendant Xiu". On 31 August 1839, she was restored as "Noble Lady Lin". On 16 October 1840, she gave birth to the emperor's seventh son, Yixuan.

In November or December 1840, Lady Uya was elevated to "Concubine Lin". On 24 March 1842, she gave birth to the emperor's ninth daughter, Princess Shouzhuang of the First Rank.

In June or July 1842, Lady Uya was elevated to "Consort Lin". She gave birth on 14 March 1844 to the emperor's eighth son, Yihe, and on 15 November 1845 to his ninth son, Yihui. In January or February 1847, she was elevated to "Noble Consort Lin".

=== Xianfeng era ===
The Daoguang Emperor died on 26 February 1850 and was succeeded by his fourth son Yizhu, who was enthroned as the Xianfeng Emperor. The Xianfeng Emperor granted Lady Uya the title "Dowager Noble Consort Lin".

=== Tongzhi era ===
The Xianfeng Emperor died on 22 August 1861 and was succeeded by his first son Zaichun, who was enthroned as the Tongzhi Emperor. The Tongzhi Emperor elevated Lady Uya to "Grand Dowager Imperial Noble Consort Lin" in November or December 1861.

Lady Uya died on 13 December 1866 and was granted the posthumous title "Imperial Noble Consort Zhuangshun". In 1867, she was interred in the Mu Mausoleum of the Western Qing tombs.

=== Guangxu era ===
On 25 February 1875, Yixuan's second son, Zaitian, was enthroned as the Guangxu Emperor. The Guangxu Emperor increased the amount of offerings at Lady Uya's tomb and had more ancestral worship rites performed for her.

== Titles ==
- During the reign of the Daoguang Emperor (r. 1820–1850):
  - Lady Uya (烏亞施;from 29 November 1822)
  - Noble Lady Lin (琳貴人; from March/April 1837), sixth rank consort
  - First Class Attendant Xiu (秀常在; from 3 December 1837), seventh rank consort
  - Noble Lady Lin (琳貴人; from 31 August 1839), sixth rank consort
  - Concubine Lin (琳嬪; from November/December 1840), fifth rank consort
  - Consort Lin (琳妃; from June/July 1842), fourth rank consort
  - Noble Consort Lin (琳貴妃; from January/February 1847), third rank consort
- During the reign of the Xianfeng Emperor (r. 1850-1861):
  - Dowager Noble Consort Lin (琳貴太妃)
- During the reign of the Tongzhi Emperor (r. 1861–1875):
  - Grand Dowager Imperial Noble Consort Lin (琳太皇貴太妃; from November/December 1861)
  - Imperial Noble Consort Zhuangshun (莊順皇貴妃; from December 1866), second rank title

== Issue ==
- As Noble Lady Lin:
  - Yixuan (奕譞; 16 October 1840 – 1 January 1891), the Daoguang Emperor's seventh son, granted the title Prince Chun of the Second Rank in 1850, elevated to Prince Chun of the First Rank in 1872, posthumously honoured as Prince Chunxian of the First Rank
- As Concubine Lin:
  - Princess Shouzhuang of the First Rank (壽莊固倫公主; 24 March 1842 – 11 March 1884), the Daoguang Emperor's ninth daughter
    - Married Dehui (德徽; d. 1859) of the Bolod (博罗特) clan in December 1859 or January 1860
- As Consort Lin:
  - Yihe (奕詥; 14 March 1844 – 17 December 1868), the Daoguang Emperor's eighth son, granted the title Prince Zhong of the Second Rank in 1850, posthumously honoured as Prince Zhongduan of the Second Rank
  - Yihui (奕譓; 15 November 1845 – 22 March 1877), the Daoguang Emperor's ninth son, granted the title Prince Fu of the Second Rank in 1850, posthumously honoured as Prince Fujing of the Second Rank
- As Noble Consort Lin:
  - Miscarriage (1848)

== Gallery ==
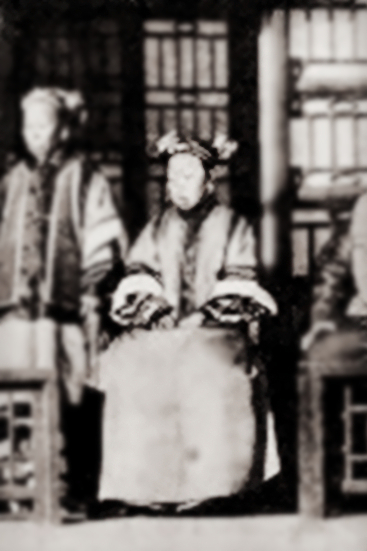
Princess Shouzhuang of the First Rank after the marriage

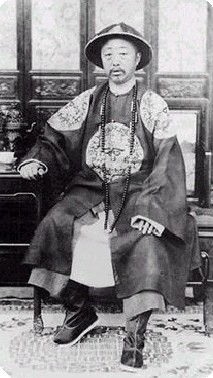
Prince Chunxian of the First Rank, imperial noble consort's eldest son

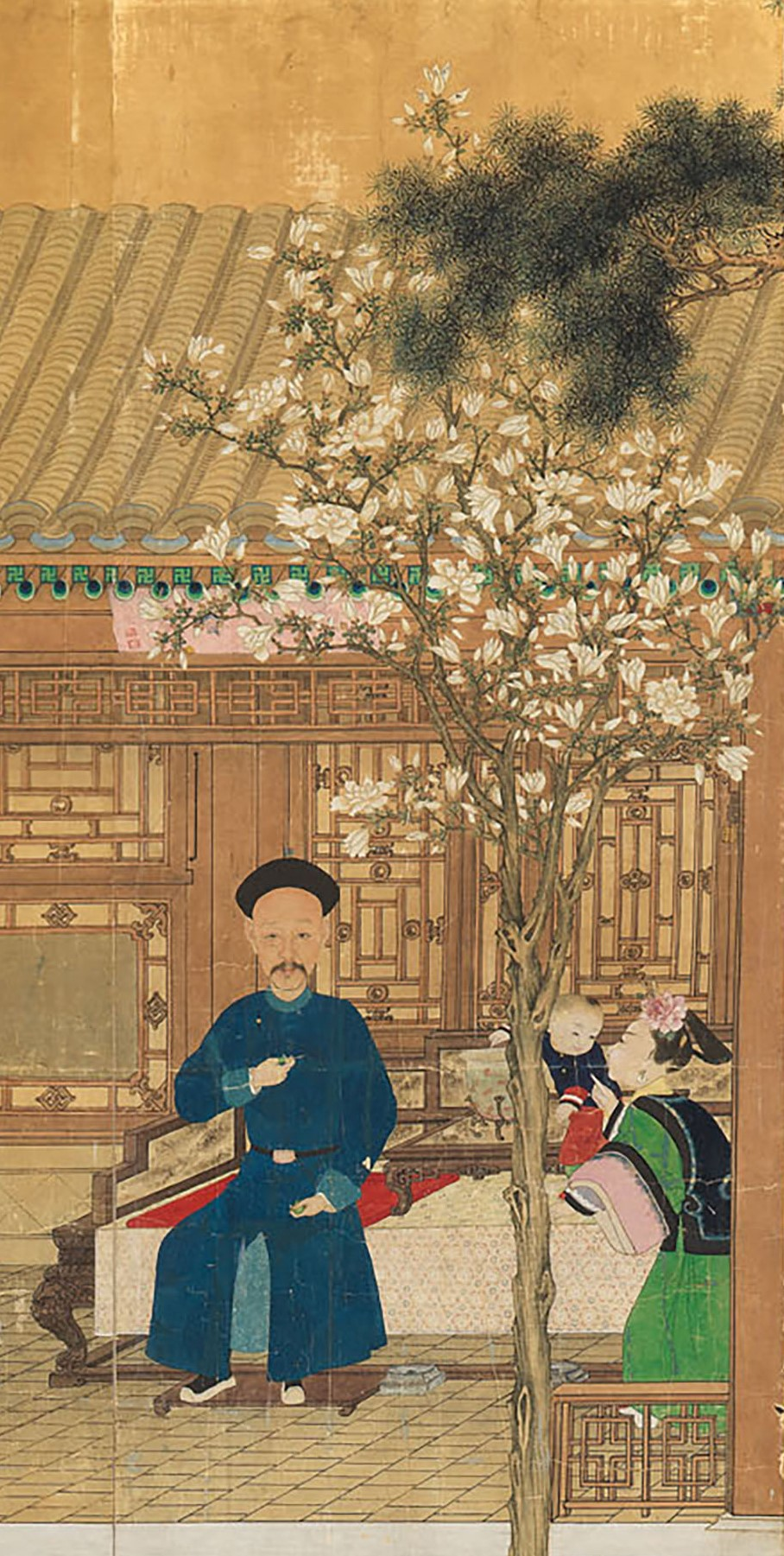
Noble Consort Lin holding Yihe, future Prince Zhongduan of the Second Rank

== In fiction and popular culture ==
- Portrayed by Sherry Chen in Curse of the Royal Harem (2011)

== See also ==
- Ranks of imperial consorts in China#Qing
- Royal and noble ranks of the Qing dynasty
