= Yunxu =

- Prince Yuke of the Second Rank

Prince Yu of the Second Rank
- Tenure: 30 March 1730 – 8 March 1731
- Successor: Hongqing
- Born: Yinxu (胤禑); 24 December 1693
- Died: 8 March 1731 (aged 37)
- Spouse: Lady Guwalgiya
- Issue: Hongqing; Hongfu; Lady of the Second Rank
Posthumous name
- Prince Yuke of the Second Rank (愉恪郡王)
- Father: Kangxi Emperor
- Mother: Consort Shunyimi (Lady Wang)

Yunxu (允禑; 24 December 1693 – 8 March 1731) was Kangxi Emperor's 15th surviving son and the first holder of Prince Yu of the Second Rank peerage. Due to his young age, Yunxu was not embroiled in the succession brawl among his brothers.

== Life ==
Yunxu was born on 24 December 1693 to Lady Wang, Concubine Mi. He had two full younger brothers, Prince Zhuangke of the First Rank Yunlu and Yinxie. Although his mother belonged to the ranks of Kangxi Emperor's favoured consorts, Yunxu was raised with the help of Consort De. In 1708, a hand of Lady Guwalgiya, daughter of Shi Wenbing and younger sister of the Crown Prince's wife, was given to Yunxu.

=== Court career ===
Although Yunxu was related by marriage to Yunreng's primary consort and had been brought up together with Yunreng's children, he didn't affiliate himself with the Party of Crown Prince. In September 1711, Yunxu accompanied his father, the Kangxi Emperor, on the tour to the imperial residences in Rehe. In December 1711, Yunxu accompanied his father during the visit to the Eastern Qing tombs. In 1715, Yunxu accompanied his father on the imperial inspection tour.

He was among the princes who had reached the age of 20 (in sui) by Yongzheng Emperor's ascension to the throne. Thus, he was eligible to fight for the throne. However, Yunxu kept a low profile and was sent to guard Jing mausoleum in the Eastern Qing tombs. In 1726, Yunxu was granted a title of Prince of the Third Rank, customary for imperial sons. In 1731, Yunxu was promoted to the Prince of the Second Rank under the honorific name "Yu" (愉).

=== Death and succession ===
Yunxu died on 8 March 1731 and was posthumously honoured as Prince Yuke of the Second Rank. He was succeeded by the eldest son, Hongqing.

== Family ==
Yunxu was married to lady Guwalgiya, daughter of Shi Wenbing (石文炳) and younger sister of Yunreng's wife.

Primary Consort

- Primary consort, of the Gūwalgiya clan (嫡福晋 瓜尔佳氏), daughter of Wenbing
  - Second daughter (14 October 1716 – 31 March 1726)

Secondary Consort

- Secondary consort, of the Gūwalgiya clan (侧福晋 瓜尔佳氏), daughter of Bose (博色)
  - First daughter (22 March 1716 — February/March 1717)
  - First son (25 March 1718 – 27 November 1719)
  - Second son (30 September 1719 – 20 August 1720)
  - Third daughter (30 September 1722 – 23 September 1730)
  - Lady of the Second Rank (县君; 30 September 1722 – 3 January 1745), fourth daughter
    - Married Dondob Dorji (敦多布多尔济) of the Dinghao Borjigin clan
  - Prince Yugong of the Second Rank Hongqing (愉恭郡王 弘庆; 4 September 1724 – 19 January 1770), third son
  - Hongshou (弘绶; 5 November 1727 – 17 December 1731), fifth son
  - Fifth daughter (23 October 1729 – 1748)

Concubine

- Mistress, of the Du clan (庶福晋 杜氏)
  - Hongfu, Third Class General of the First Rank (三等镇国将军 弘富; 27 April 1727 – 12 October 1783), fourth son
