= Yanja =

Manchu clan and family name

Chinese name
- Chinese: 颜扎氏
Transcriptions
Standard Mandarin
- Hanyu Pinyin: yán zhā shì

Manchu name
- Manchu script: ᠶᠠᠨᠵᠠ
- Möllendorff: Yanja

Pronunciation respelling name
- Pronunciation respelling: YHAN-zhah

Yanjais a Manchu clan and family name.

== Notable figures ==
=== Males ===
- Zhaotu (兆图), a jiduwei
  - Tana (塔纳), a yunjiwei
    - Tuzhu (图珠), a third class qingche duwei
- Andali
- Buyantai (布彦泰; 1791–1880), served as a General of Ili, second rank military official and Viceroy of Shaan-Gan in 1845
- Jinglian (景廉,1823-1885), served as a vice commander of Manchu Bordered Red Banner in 1852, a fourth rank literary official of the ministry of Personnel and ministry of Justice, a General of Ili in 1858, Imperial Commissioner in 1875 and a member of Council of State
- Dingcheng (定成), a sixth rank literary official in 1884, an official in the ministry of Justice in 1886, an examiner of the Ministry of Justice in 1889, a magistrate of Yizhou in 1899, a master of ceremonies in 1906 and Vice Minister of Justice in 1911.
- Yuxian (毓贤;1842–1901), known for organisation of Taiyuan massacre as a governor of Shanxi

=== Females ===
Princess Consort

- Secondary Consort
  - Yujuan (1845–1881), Yixuan's secondary consort
- Concubine
  - Hong Taiji's concubine, the mother of Yebušu (1627–1690)
