= Prince Fu =

Prince Fu of the Second Rank
- Traditional Chinese: 多羅孚郡王
- Simplified Chinese: 多罗孚郡王
Transcriptions
Standard Mandarin
- Hanyu Pinyin: duōluó fú jùnwáng
- Wade–Giles: to-lo fu chün-wang

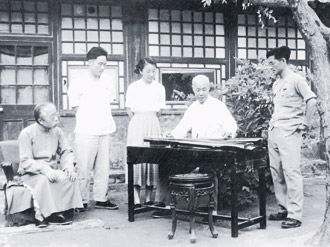
Pujin (1893–1966) (second from left), the fourth in line in the Prince Fu peerage

Prince Fu of the Second Rank, or simply Prince Fu, was the title of a princely peerage used in China during the Manchu-led Qing dynasty (1644–1912). As the Prince Fu peerage was not awarded "iron-cap" status, this meant that each successive bearer of the title would normally start off with a title downgraded by one rank vis-à-vis that held by his predecessor. However, the title would generally not be downgraded to any lower than a feng'en fuguo gong except under special circumstances.

The first bearer of the title was Yihui (奕譓; 1845–1877), the Daoguang Emperor's ninth son, who was granted the title "Prince Fu of the Second Rank" by his father in 1850. The title was passed down over three generations and held by four persons.

== Members of the Prince Fu peerage ==
- Yihui (奕譓; 15 Nov 1845 – 22 Mar 1877; 1st), the Daoguang Emperor's ninth son, held the title Prince Fu of the Second Rank from 1850 to 1877, posthumously honoured as Prince Fu Jing of the Second Rank (孚敬郡王)
  - (a) Zaipei (載沛; 31 Mar 1872 – 23 Aug 1878; 2nd), initially named Zaihuang (載煌), Yidong's (a member from Prince Yu (愉)) sixth son and Yihui's adopted son, succeeded Yihui in 1877 as a beile
  - (a) Zaishu (載澍; 8 Nov 1870 – after 1909; 3rd), initially named Zaiji (載楫), Yizhan's (a member from Prince Zhi (直)) son and Yihui's adopted son, held the title of a beile from 1878 to 1897, his title stripped in 1897. His consort was 3rd daughter of Zhaoxiang, a younger brother of Empress Dowager Cixi. He had two daughters.
  - N/A
    - (a) Pujin (溥伒; 30 Aug 1893 – 1966; 4th), Zaiying's (a member from Prince Dun) eldest son and Yihui's adopted grandson, held the title of a beizi from 1897 to 1945. He was missing with his daughter during Cultural Revolution.
      - 1 & 2 Yuquan (毓㟫) & Yuyan (毓巘)

== Family tree ==
Legend:

- - Title bearers
- - Emperors

adoption
Kangxi Emperor
1	4	15
Yunzhi 允禔; 1672–1734; Prince Zhi of the Second Rank 直郡王; 1698–1708	Yongzheng Emperor	Yunxu 允禑 (1693–1731); Prince Yu Ke of the Second Rank 愉恪郡王; 1730–1731
12	4	3
Hongxiang 弘晌; 1718–1781; Grace General 奉恩將軍; 1773–1781	Qianlong Emperor	Hongqing 弘慶; 1724–1769; Prince Yu Gong of the Second Rank 愉恭郡王; 1731–1769
1	15	1
Yongduo 永多; 1740–1809; Grace General 奉恩將軍	Jiaqing Emperor	Yongjian 永珔; 1766–1820; Beile 貝勒; 1770–1820
2	3	6
Miankang 綿康; 1796–1845	Daoguang Emperor	Miankai 綿愷; 1795–1838; Prince Dun Ke of the First Rank 惇恪親王 (posthumously awarded)	Miankun 綿崑; 1792–1831; Second Class Defender General 二等鎮國將軍; 1812–1831
5	9
Yizhan 奕瞻; 1839–1885	Yicong 奕誴; 1831–1889; Prince Dun Qin of the First Rank 惇勤親王; 1860–1889	Yihui ^{1} 奕譓; 1845–1877; Prince Fu Jing of the Second Rank 孚敬郡王; 1850–1877	Yidong 奕棟; 1812–1872; Bulwark General 輔國將軍; 1832–1872
4	6
Zaishu ^{3} 載澍; 1870–? Beile 貝勒; 1878–1897	Zaiying 載瀛; 1859–1930; Beile Gongke 恭恪貝勒; 1900–1930	Zaipei ^{2} 載沛; 1872–1878; Beile 貝勒; 1877–1878
Pujin ^{4} 溥伒; 1893–1966; Beizi 貝子; 1897–1945

== See also ==
- Royal and noble ranks of the Qing dynasty
- Prince Dun
- Prince Zhi (直)
- Prince Yu (愉)
