= Yihe =

- Prince Zhong of the Second Rank 多羅鍾郡王
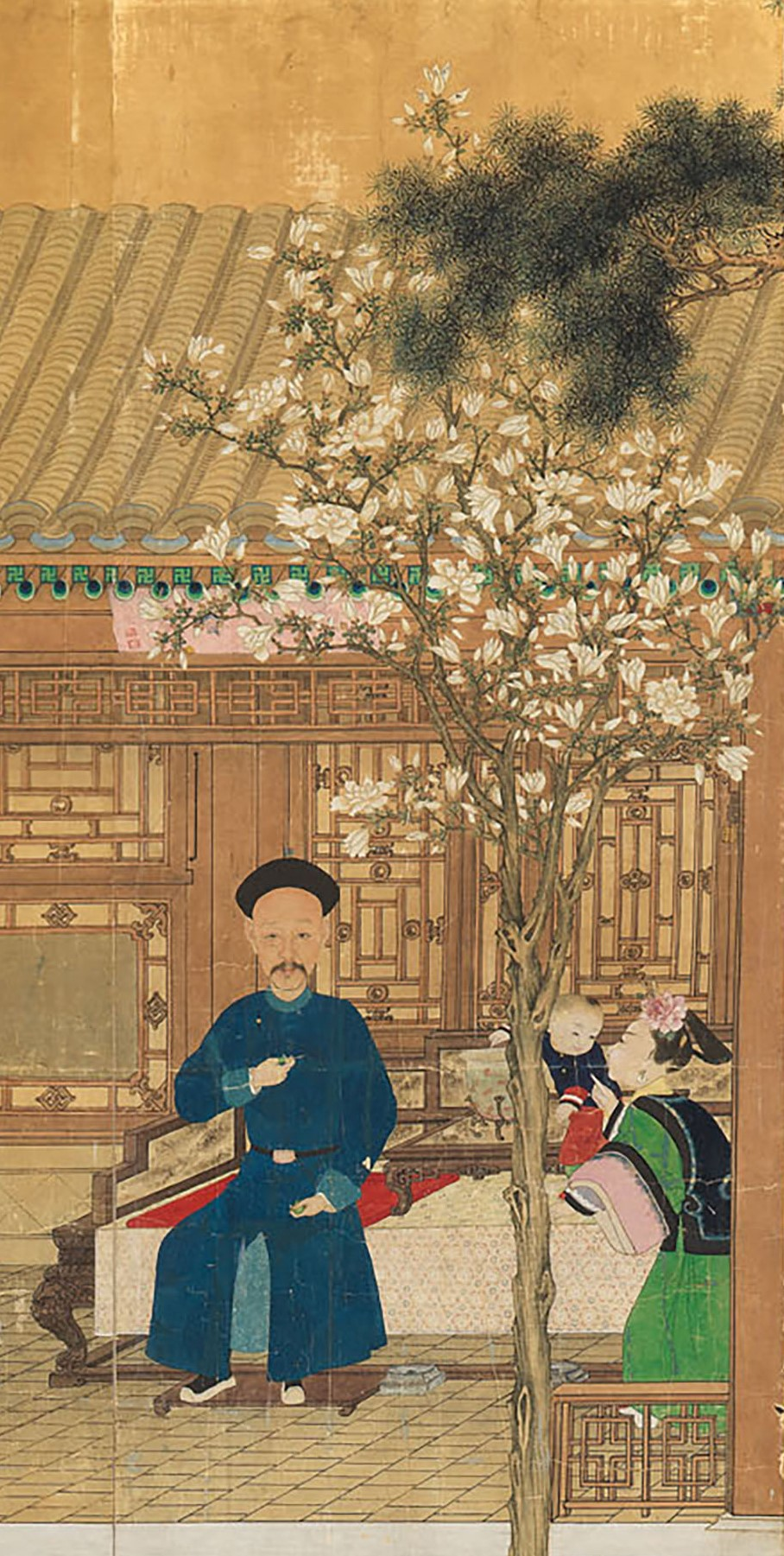
- Yihe in 1844 being held by his mother

Head of the House of Prince Zhong peerage
- Tenure: 1850–1868
- Predecessor: peerage created
- Successor: Zaiying
- Born: Yihe (奕詥); 14 March 1844
- Died: 17 December 1868 (aged 24)
- Spouse: lady Niohuru
Posthumous name
- Prince Zhongduan of the Second Rank (鍾端郡王)
- House: Aisin Gioro
- Father: Daoguang Emperor
- Mother: Imperial Noble Consort Zhuangshun

Yihe (奕詥; 14 March 1844 – 17 December 1868) was Daoguang Emperor's eighth son and the first holder of Prince Zhong peerage. As the peerage was not granted perpetual inheritability, Yihe's potential successors would hold diminished ranks.

== Life ==
Yihe was born on 14 March 1844 to Imperial Noble Consort Zhuangshun, lady Uya in the Garden of Elegant Spring in Yuanmingyuan. Yihe had also one elder brother, Yixuan, and one younger brother, Yihui. In 1850, Yihe started studying in the Imperial Study. His tutors were editor in the Hanlin academy Zhong Fucheng (重福承), future regent under the minority of the Tongzhi Emperor Kuang Yuan (匡源) and Weng Xincun (翁心存). That same year, Yihe was granted a title of Prince Zhong of the Second Rank (钟郡王) at the age of barely 6 years. Due to his prematurity, Yihe did not have sufficient rights to compete for succession.

Yihe's ultimate career started during the minority of Tongzhi Emperor. Yihe was appointed to make sacrifices at the Imperial Ancestral Temple in 1864. From that year on, he presided at the sacrificial rites in the Imperial ancestral temple on behalf of the teenage emperor and two empresses dowagers and Shamanic rites in the autumn 1866. In 1865, he was entrusted with the affairs of the Hall of Uprightness and Objectivity (中正殿).

Yihe died in 1868 and was posthumously honoured as Prince Zhongduan of the Second Rank.

== Family ==
Yihe was married to lady Niohuru (嫡福晋 钮祜禄氏), daughter of first class marquis Chong'en (一等侯崇恩) and grand niece of Empress Xiaoherui. As Yihe did not have children, Zaiying and Zaitao were adopted as his successors.

1. Adopted son: Prince of the Third Rank acting as Prince of the Second Rank Zaiying (载滢), biological son of Yixin, Prince Gongzhong of the First Rank and Secondary Princess Consort Gongzhong, lady Xuegiya (侧福晋 薛佳氏). Adopted pursuing the request of princess consort Zhongduan of the Second Rank. Stripped of his title for the involvement into the Boxer Rebellion.
2. Adopted son: Prince of the Third Rank acting as Prince of the Second Rank Zaitao, biological son of Yixuan, Prince Chunxian of the First Rank and Secondary Princess Consort Chunxian, Liugiya Cuiyan. Adopted on the decree of Empress Dowager Cixi.
