= Zaitao =

Manchu prince of the Qing dynasty (1887–1970)

- Junwang-ranked beile 郡王銜貝勒
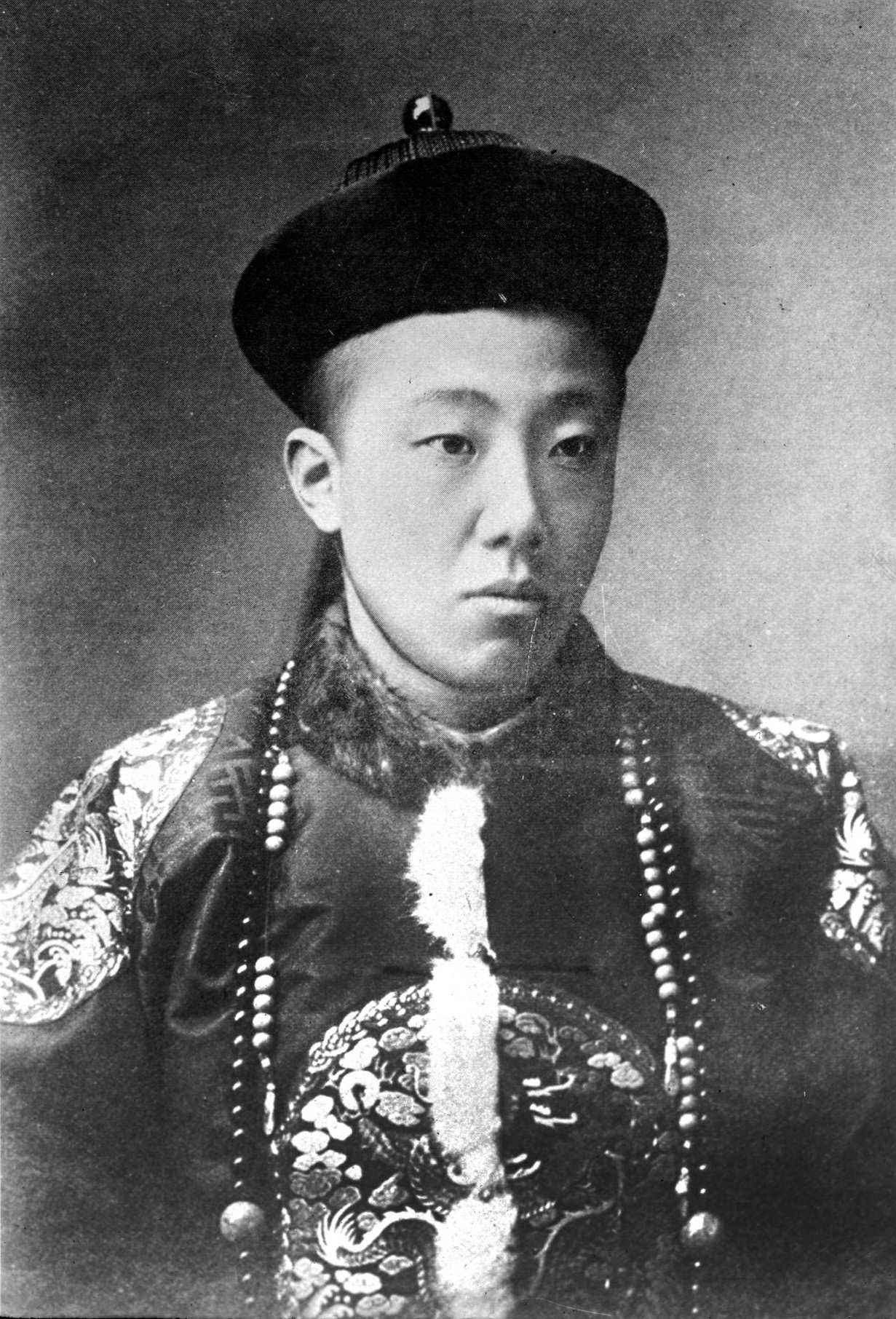
- Zaitao in traditional Qing Robes, taken by Charles Chusseau-Flaviens, early 1900s

Head of the House of Prince Zhong peerage
- Tenure: 1900–1945
- Predecessor: Zaiying
- Successor: peerage abolished
- Born: 23 June 1887; Beijing, China
- Died: 2 September 1970 (aged 83); Beijing, China
- Burial: Babaoshan Revolutionary Cemetery, Beijing, China
- Consorts: Jiang Wanzhen (died 1949) Zhou Mengyun (div. 1949) Jin Xiaolan (died 1967) Wang Naiwen (before 1970)
- Issue: Pujia; Pu'an; Pushen; Puxi; Pushi; Yunhui
Names
- Aisin Gioro Zaitao (愛新覺羅 載濤)
- House: Aisin Gioro
- Father: Yixuan, Prince Chunxian of the First Rank
- Mother: Liugiya Cuiyan
- Military career
- Allegiance: Qing dynasty
- Branch: Imperial Guards
- Conflicts: Korean War
- Awards: Order of the Double Dragon; Order of Saint Alexander Nevsky; Order of the Precious Brilliant Golden Grain

Zaitao
- Traditional Chinese: 載濤
- Simplified Chinese: 载涛
Transcriptions
Standard Mandarin
- Hanyu Pinyin: Zǎitāo

Shuyuan
- Chinese: 叔源
Transcriptions
Standard Mandarin
- Hanyu Pinyin: Shūyuán

Yeyun art name
- Traditional Chinese: 野雲
- Simplified Chinese: 野云
Transcriptions
Standard Mandarin
- Hanyu Pinyin: Yěyún

Zaitao (23 June 1887 – 2 September 1970), courtesy name Shuyuan, art name Yeyun, was a Manchu prince of the Qing dynasty. He was a half-brother of the Guangxu Emperor and an uncle of Puyi, the last Emperor of China.

== Biography ==
Zaitao was born in the Manchu Aisin Gioro clan as the seventh son of Yixuan (Prince Chun). His family was under the Plain Red Banner of the Eight Banners. He was adopted by an older male relative, Yimo (奕謨; 1850–1905), who had no son to succeed him.

In 1890, during the reign of the Guangxu Emperor, Zaitao was granted the title of a second class zhenguo jiangjun. He was promoted to a buru bafen fuguo gong in 1894. In 1898, Zaitao was transferred from Yimo's lineage to the lineage of Yihe (奕詥; 1844–1868), Prince Zhong of the Second Rank, as Yihe's adopted son because Yihe had no son to succeed him. He was made an acting beizi in the same year. In 1902, he was promoted to beile.

In December 1908, Zaitao was made an acting junwang (second-rank prince), even though nominally he still remained as a beile. In the same year, he and Tieliang (鐵良) were appointed as zongsi jicha (總司稽察; a type of inspector-official). A year later, during the reign of the Xuantong Emperor, Zaitao was put in charge of the Military Consultancy (軍諮處). In 1910, he visited eight countries – Japan, the United States, Britain, France, Germany, Italy, Austria, and Russia – to observe and learn from their more advanced armed forces. In May 1910, he was sent to Britain as an ambassador to represent the Qing Empire at the funeral of King Edward VII.

In 1911, Zaitao was appointed as the Minister of the Military Consultancy (軍諮大臣) and placed in charge of the Imperial Guard (禁衛軍), as well as being appointed as chief of general staff. He was also designated as the commander of the Mongol Bordered Yellow Banner. In January 1912, after the fall of the Qing Empire, Zaitao, along with Zaixun and others from the imperial clan, founded the Royalist Party (宗社黨) to preserve their ancestral temple. In 1917, when the warlord Zhang Xun briefly restored Puyi to the throne, Zaitao was appointed as the Commanding Officer of the Imperial Guards.

In 1931, Zaitao was recruited by the Nationalist Government of the Republic of China to join the National Crisis Conference (國難會議). After the People's Republic of China was established in 1949, Zaitao served as a member of the National People's Congress and Chinese People's Political Consultative Conference.

Zaitao fancied horses. In his early years, he studied cavalry warfare in the Saumur Cavalry School in France. After 1949, he served as a consultant on horses in the artillery formation of the People's Liberation Army. During the Korean War, he went to Inner Mongolia to choose horses for the People’s Volunteer Army.

Zaitao was also interested in Beijing opera. He was trained in both long and short range types of performing martial arts, and specialised in playing monkey roles in opera. He was tutored by Yang Xiaolou (楊小樓) and Zhang Qilin (張淇林). Opera actor Li Wanchun (李萬春) trained under Zaitao for three years.

Zaitao died in Beijing in 1970 at the age of 83.

== Family ==
Wife

- Wife, of the Jiang clan (姜氏; 1885–1949), personal name Wanzhen (婉貞)
  - First son (1905)
  - First daughter (b. 6 March 1906)
  - Second daughter (24 December 1906 – 1969), personal name Yunhui (韞慧)
    - Married Darijaya (1904–1968) of the Alxa Borjigit clan in 1925, and had issue (one son, six daughters)
  - Pujia (溥佳; 1908–1979), second son
  - Pu'an (溥侒; 1911–1944), third son
  - Pushen (溥伸; 1915–1928), fourth son

Concubine

- Concubine, of the Zhou clan (周氏; b. 1894), personal name Mengyun (夢雲)
  - Puxi (溥僖; 1924–1983), fifth son
- Concubine, of the Jin clan (金氏; 1906–1967), personal name Xiaolan (孝蘭)
  - Pushi (溥仕; b. 1940), sixth son
- Concubine, of the Wang clan (王氏; 1917–2003), personal name Naiwen (乃文)

== Ancestry ==
Qianlong Emperor (1711–1799)
Jiaqing Emperor (1760–1820)
Empress Xiaoyichun (1727–1775)
Daoguang Emperor (1782–1850)
He'erjing'e
Empress Xiaoshurui (1760–1797)
Lady Wanggiya
Yixuan (1840–1891)
Bailu
Lingshou (1788–1824)
Imperial Noble Consort Zhuangshun (1822–1866)
Lady Weng
Zaitao (1887–1970)
Deqing
Cuiyan (1866–1925)

== Gallery ==
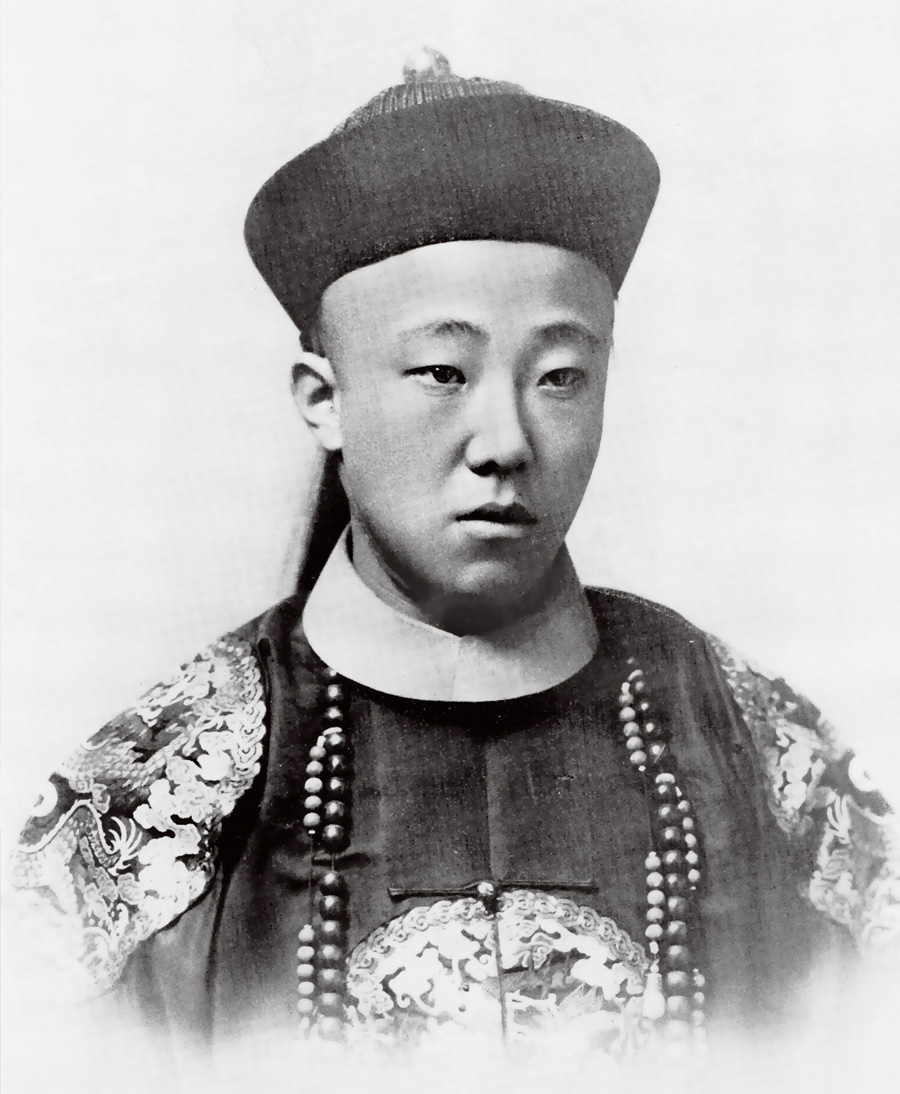
Zaitao in Qing dynasty court robes

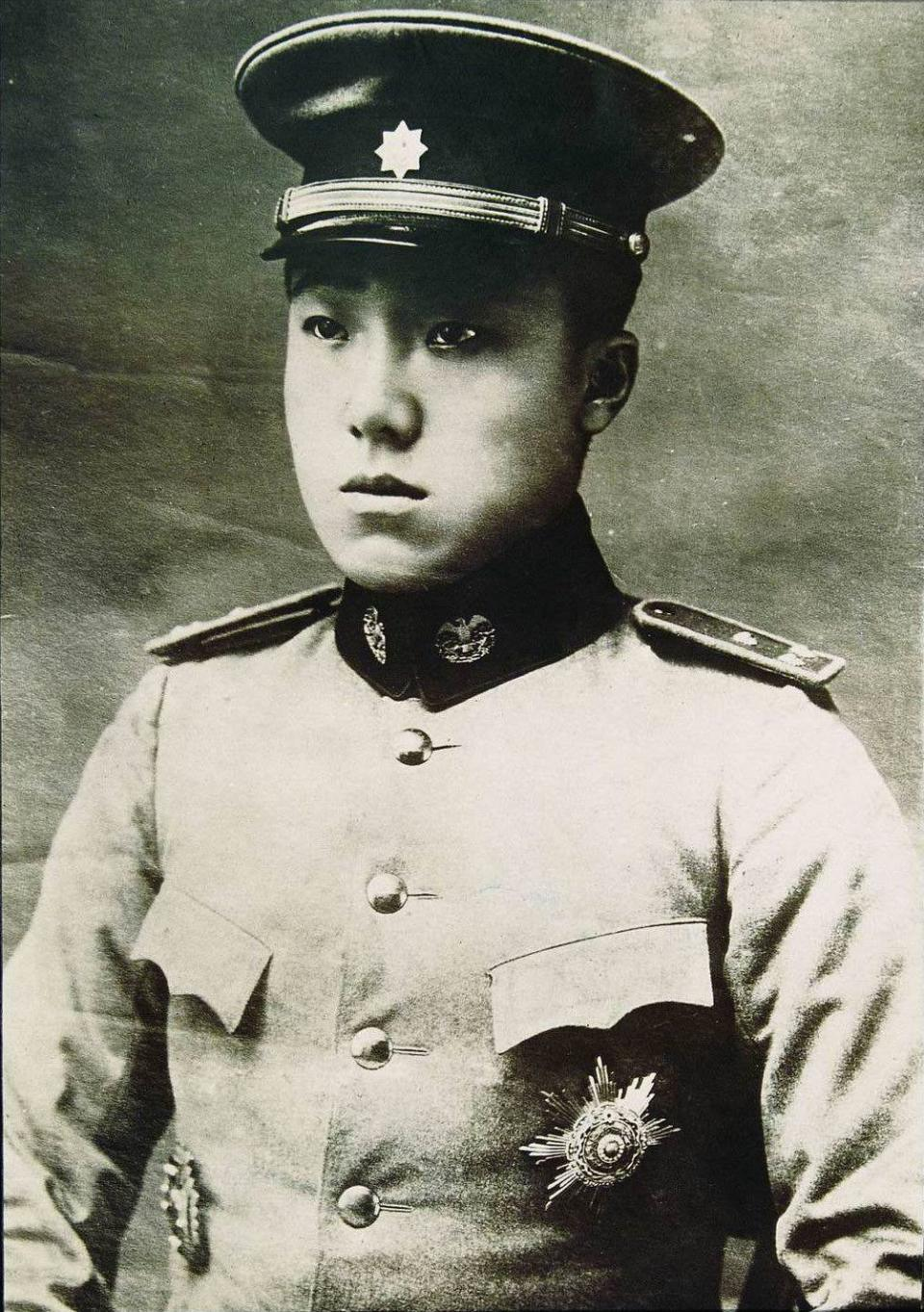
Zaitao wearing the star of the Order of the Double Dragon, 1910s

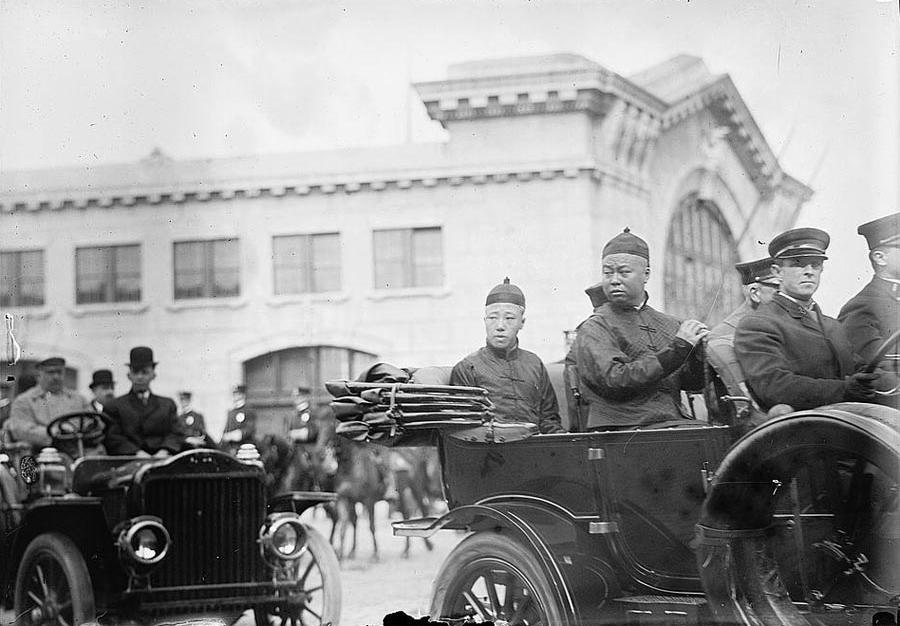
Zaitao in the United States

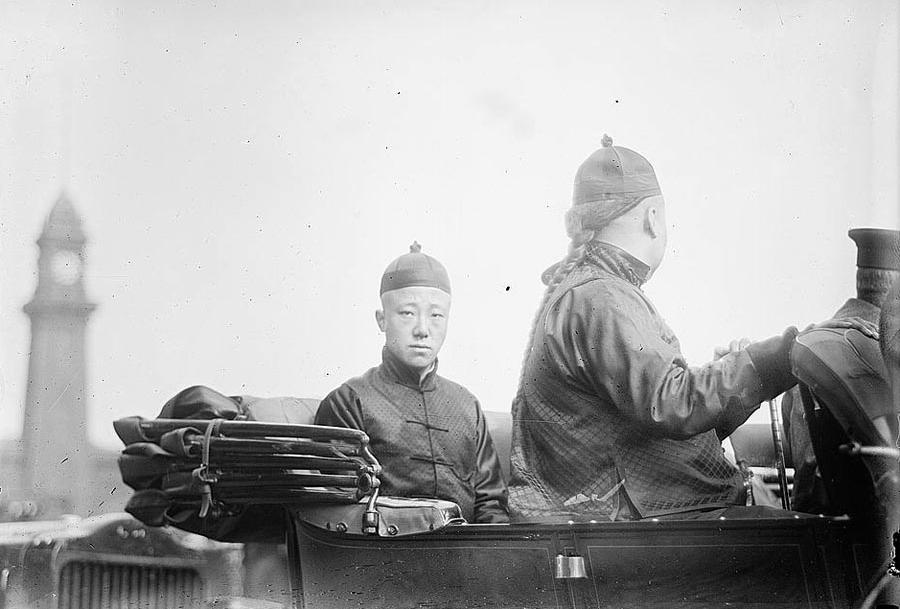
Zaitao in the United States

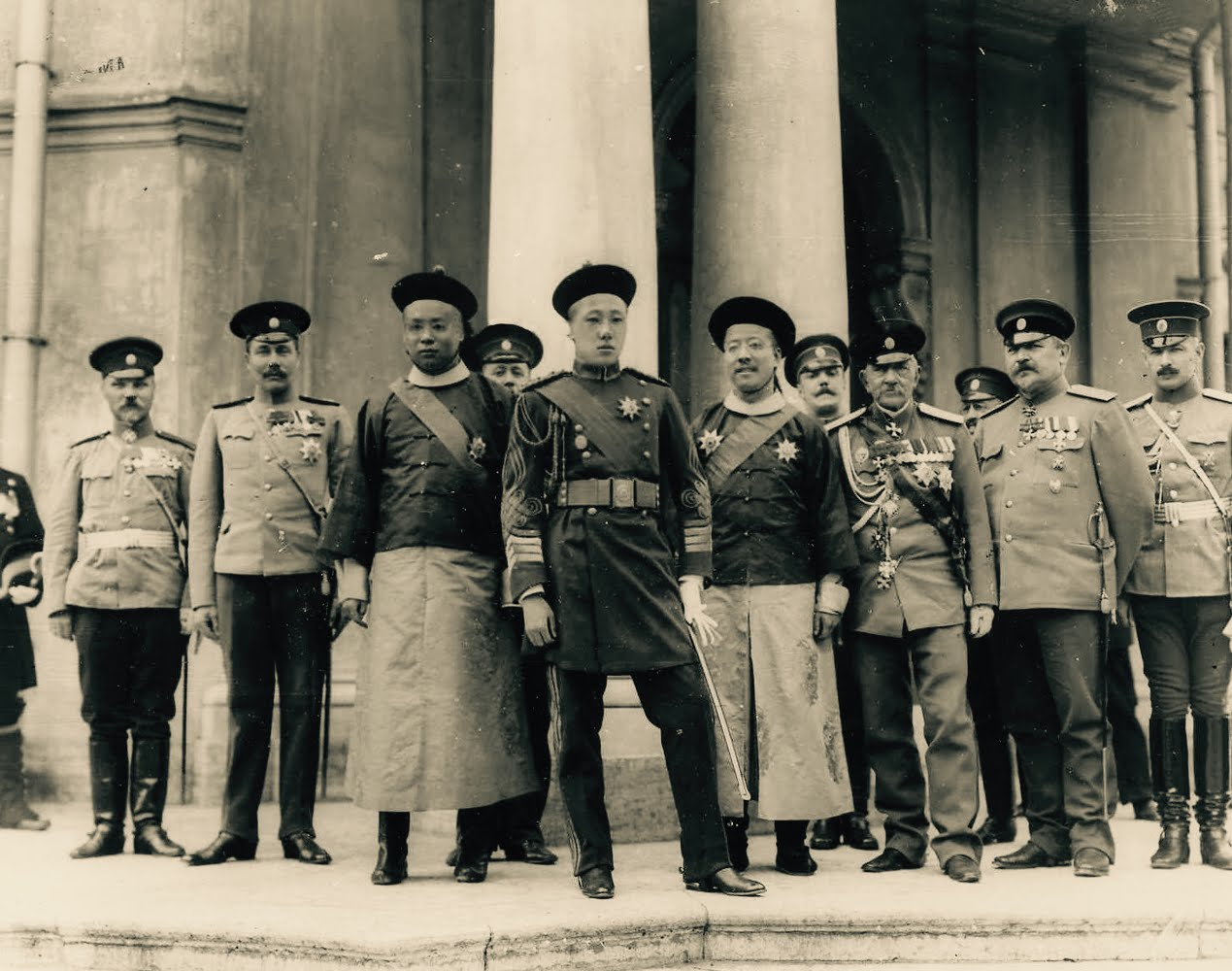
Zaitao (centre) in Russia in 1910

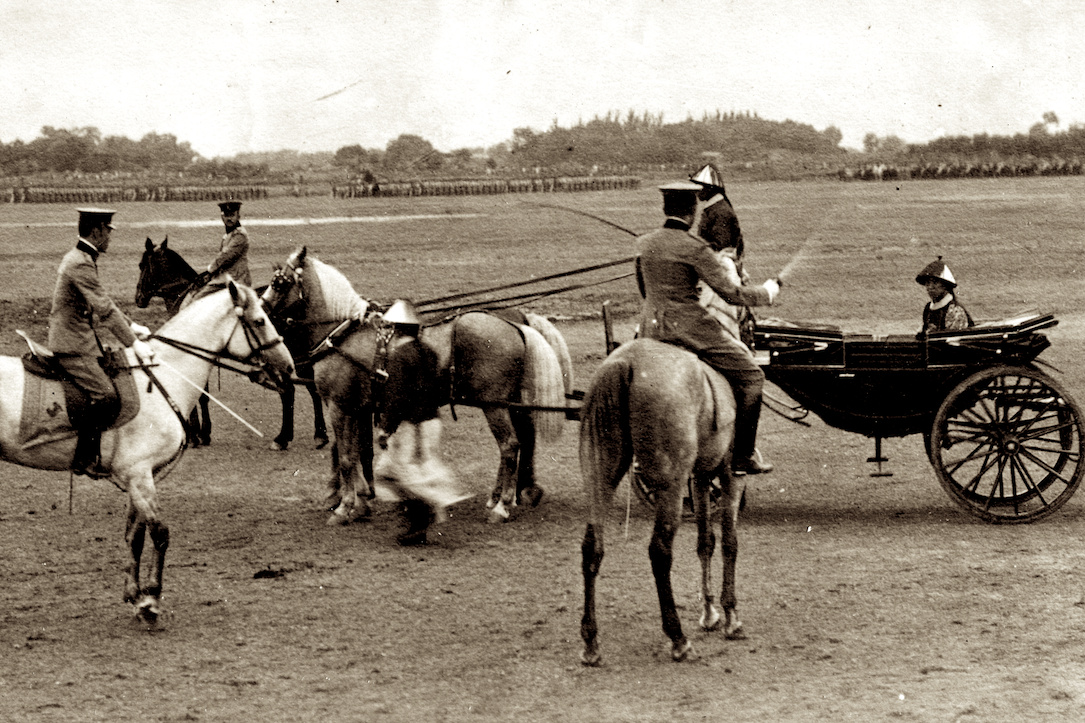
Zaitao in Peking in 1911

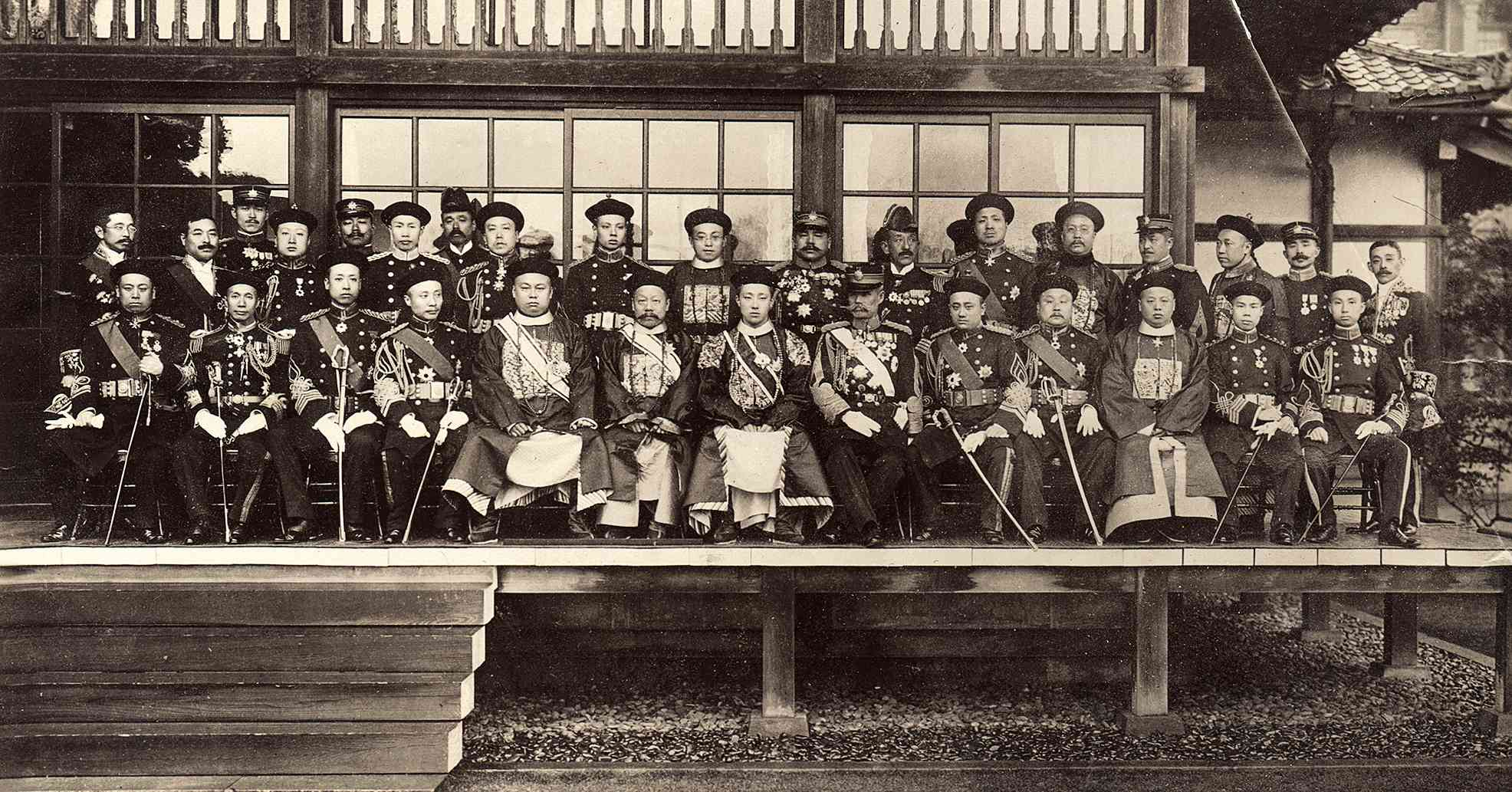
Zaitao with Chinese and Japanese delegates in the Qing embassy in Japan

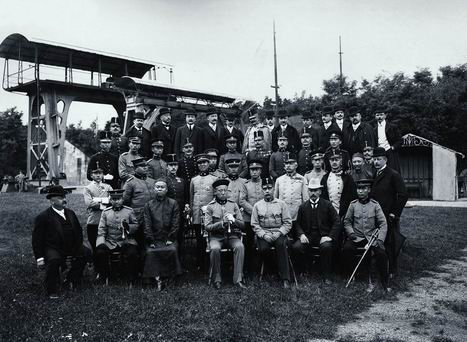
Zaitao with Qing dynasty military leaders in Austria-Hungary in 1910

== See also ==
- Prince Zhong
- Prince Hui (first rank)
- Royal and noble ranks of the Qing dynasty § Male members
- Ranks of imperial consorts in China § Qing

== Sources ==
=== Further reading ===
- Esherick, Joseph W.; Wei, C.X. George (2013). China: How the Empire Fell. New York: Routledge, Taylor & Francis Group. ISBN 978-0-415-83101-7.
