= Cuiyan (consort of Yixuan) =

Chinese noble (1866–1925)

Lady Liugiya
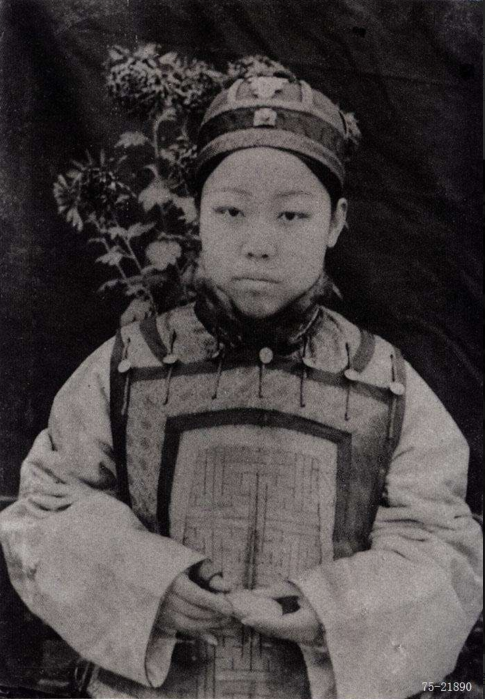
- Born: Liu Cuiyan (劉翠妍); 1866 (同治五年)
- Died: 1925 (aged 58–59); Prince Chun Mansion
- Spouse: Yixuan, Prince Chunxian of the First Rank (died 1891)
- Issue: Zaifeng, Prince Chun of the First Rank; Zaixun; Zaitao; Second daughter
Names
- Liugiya Cuiyan (劉佳 翠妍)
- House: Liu, later Liugiya (劉佳; by birth); Aisin Gioro (by marriage)
- Father: Deqing

Cuiyan (1866–1925), of the Manchu Bordered White Banner Liugiya clan, was a consort of Yixuan. She was 26 years his junior.

== Life ==
=== Family background ===
Lady Liu was a Han Chinese Booi Aha by birth.

- Father: Deqing (德慶), served as a fifth rank official (五品典衛)

=== Life ===
Lady Liu was born in 1867, during the reign of the Tongzhi Emperor. She became a lady-in-waiting, and then secondary consort, of Yixuan, the seventh son of the Daoguang Emperor, during the reign of the Guangxu Emperor. The Guangxu Emperor is Lady Liu's step son and born to Yixuan's primary consort Yehenara Wanzhen. Yehenara Wanzhen is the younger sister of Yehenara Xingzhen, also known as Empress Dowager Cixi.

She gave birth on 12 February 1883 to Yixuan's fifth son, Zaifeng, on 20 May 1885 to his sixth son, Zaixun, and on 23 June 1887 to his seventh son, Zaitao. Her husband Yixuan died when Cuiyan was 23 years old. After the death of Yehenara Wanzhen, Liu Cuiyan became the lady of the Prince Chun Mansion. She was 28 years old when she took on the role.

Her youngest son Zaitao was selected by Empress Dowager Cixi to inherit the title of Yihe, Prince Zhong of the Second Rank, as Yihe's adopted son because Yihe had no son to succeed him. As a result, Lady Liu suffered from madness at the age of 29. In the 27th year of the Guangxu Emperor's reign, her son Zaifeng married Gūwalgiya Youlan. Lady Liu originally planned for him to marry another woman, but Empress Dowager Cixi objected. She was 34 years old.

After Emperor Guangxu died, Empress Dowager Cixi chose Lady Liu's grandson Puyi to inherit the throne. The 41 year old Lady Liu fainted when she heard the news and her symptoms of madness worsened. She visited the palace with her daughter-in-law Youlan when Puyi turned 10 years old. In 1921, Puyi and Consort Dowager Duankang had an argument. Consort Dowager Duankang was angered and reprimanded Cuiyan and Youlan, causing Cuiyan to become disabled from fear. Youlan felt angry for being publicly reprimanded and committed suicide by swallowing opium. Lady Liu was 54 years old.

In 1925, when Puyi arrived in Tianjin, Liugiya Cuiyan died at the age of 58.

== Titles ==
- During the reign of the Tongzhi Emperor (r. 1861–1875):
  - Lady Liu (from 1866)
- During the reign of the Guangxu Emperor (r. 1875–1908):
  - Secondary consort (側福晉)

== Issue ==
- As secondary consort:
  - Zaifeng (載灃; 12 February 1883 – 3 February 1951), Yixuan's fifth son, inherited the title Prince Chun of the First Rank in 1891
    - married Gūwalgiya Youlan
      - Puyi, Emperor Xuantong
      - Pujie
      - Yunying (韞瑛)
      - Yunhe (韞和)
      - Yunying (韞穎)
  - Zaixun (載洵; 20 May 1885 – 1949), Yixuan's sixth son
  - Zaitao (載濤; 23 June 1887 – 2 September 1970), Yixuan's seventh son
  - Yixuan's second daughter
