= Prince Zhong =

Prince Zhong of the Second Rank
- Traditional Chinese: 多羅鍾郡王
- Simplified Chinese: 多罗锺郡王
Transcriptions
Standard Mandarin
- Hanyu Pinyin: duōluó zhōng jùnwáng
- Wade–Giles: to-lo chung chün-wang

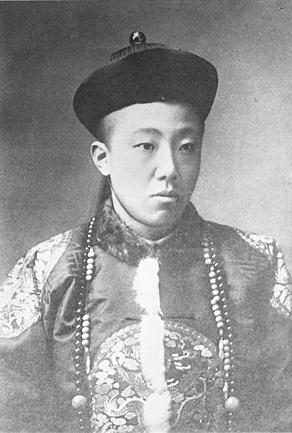
Zaitao (1887–1970), the third in the Prince Zhong line

Prince Zhong of the Second Rank, or simply Prince Zhong, was the title of a princely peerage used in China during the Manchu-led Qing dynasty (1644–1912). As the Prince Zhong peerage was not awarded "iron-cap" status, this meant that each successive bearer of the title would normally start off with a title downgraded by one rank from that held by his predecessor. However, the title would generally not be downgraded to any lower than a feng'en fuguo gong except under special circumstances.

The first bearer of the title was Yihe (奕詥; 1844–1868), the eighth son of the Daoguang Emperor. In 1850, Yihe was granted the title "Prince Zhong of the Second Rank" by his father. The title was passed down over two generations and held by three persons.

== Members of the Prince Zhong peerage ==
- Yihe (奕詥; 1844–1868), the Daoguang Emperor's eighth son, held the title Prince Zhong of the Second Rank from 1850 to 1868, posthumously honoured as Prince Zhongduan of the Second Rank (鍾端郡王)
  - Zaiying (載瀅; 1861–1909), Yixin's second son and Yihe's adopted son, held the title of a beile from 1868 to 1900, made an acting junwang in 1889, stripped of his title in 1900
  - Zaitao (1887–1970), Yixuan's seventh son and Yihe's adopted son, held the title of a second class zhenguo jiangjun from 1890 to 1894, promoted to buru bafen fuguo gong in 1894, made an acting beizi in 1898, promoted to beile in 1902 and made an acting junwang in 1908
    - Pujia (溥佳; 1908–1949), Zaitao's son
      - Yuyin (毓崟; 1927–?), Pujia's son

== Family tree ==
adoption
Minning 旻寧 (1782–1850); Daoguang Emperor 道光帝 (1820–1850)
Yixin 奕訢 (1833–1889); Prince Gongzhong of the First Rank 恭忠親王 (1850–1898)	Yixuan 奕譞 (1840–1891); Prince Chunxian of the First Rank 醇賢親王 (1872–1891)	Yihe 奕詥 (1844–1868); Prince Zhongduan of the Second Rank 鍾端郡王 (1850–1868)
Zaiying 載瀅 (1861–1909); Beile and Acting Junwang 郡王銜貝勒 (1868–1900) (stripped of his title)	Zaitao 載濤 (1888–1970); Beile and Acting Junwang 郡王銜貝勒 (1902–1945)
Pujia 溥佳 (1908–1949)
Yuyin 毓崟 (1927–?)

== See also ==
- Prince Gong (peerage)
- Prince Chun (醇)
- Prince Hui (first rank)
- Royal and noble ranks of the Qing dynasty
