= Lady Yanzha =

Yanzha Yujuan
- First secondary princess consort Chunxian of the First Rank
- Born: c. 1845
- Died: 13 December 1882 (aged 36–37)
- Burial: Tomb of the Prince Chun
- Spouse: Yixuan, Prince Chunxian of the First Rank
- Issue: First daughter
Names
- Yanzha Yujuan (颜扎·玉娟)
- House: Yanzha (颜扎氏; by birth); Aisin Gioro (by marriage)
- Father: Laifu

Lady Yanzha, secondary consort, of the Yanja clan (侧福晋颜扎氏; c. 1845–1882), was a consort of Yixuan, Prince Chunxian of the First Rank and the Daoguang Emperor's seventh son. Her personal name was Yujuan (玉娟, literally: graceful like jade).

== Life ==
Her clan was registered under the Plain Yellow Banner, one of the upper 3 banners. Most of the clansmen of Yehe kin were high-ranking officials and governors of strategically important provinces, e.g. Shanxi. Actually, her lineage was inferior to the previous one

Father: Laifu (来福)

=== Tongzhi era ===
It is not known when Lady Yanzha was taken as a servant into a residence of Yixuan. It was said that an arrival of Yujuan would create a disturbance in the manor, only because of the threat of seduction by the maid. On 11 April 1861, she gave birth to the first daughter. However, official records claim that primary princess consort Chun, Wanzhen, was the biological mother of a princess. The first daughter died on 24 November 1866.

=== Guangxu ===
On 12 January 1875, Zaitian, lady Yehe Nara's son was adopted into the palace, because Tongzhi Emperor had no male heir. Lady Yanzha died in 1881 at the age of 37 and was posthumously honoured as secondary consort by Empress Dowager Cixi

== Tomb ==
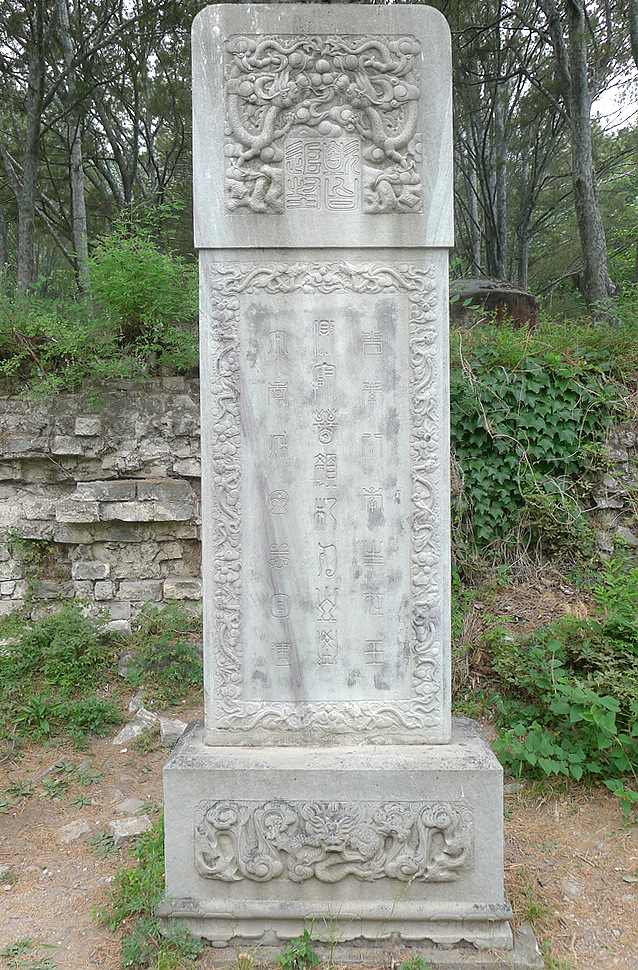
Memorial stella of lady Yanzha

Lady Yanzha was buried together with another consorts of Yixuan in the mausoleum located 35 km northwest of Beijing. Lady Yanzha's place of burial is indicated by the marble stella with carvings in small seal script . The back side of the stella reads:

“流芳遗挂都无迹，丹棘青棠莫慰情。戚戚鸡牕悲繐帐，煌煌鸾诰降瑶京。梵文妙谛千华藏，鲜馔奇珍七宝羹。没受殊恩生拜赐，旁妻几见此哀荣”。光绪辛巳仲冬下浣并书"。 “Trace of the flowing fragrance is lost, daylilies and blue begonias don't dispel the sorrow. Anxious rooster apprehensively looks out from cage, shining luan lands onto famed land. Pleasant sanskrit words mean more than the most precious treasures and fresh food. If you haven't had a grace to expand the family, my wife wouldn't share the honour of mourning." Written in the midwinter of Guangxu Xinsi year [1881 - editor's note]

Her kurgan was renovated after 1996. The kurhan with the whole mausoleum appeared in Quentin Tarantino's 2004 film Kill Bill: Volume 2 as the home and training grounds of the legendary Shaolin monk Bai Mei.
