= Yixuan, Prince Chun =

Qing Dynasty prince (1840–1891)

Yixuan
- Prince Chun of the First Rank
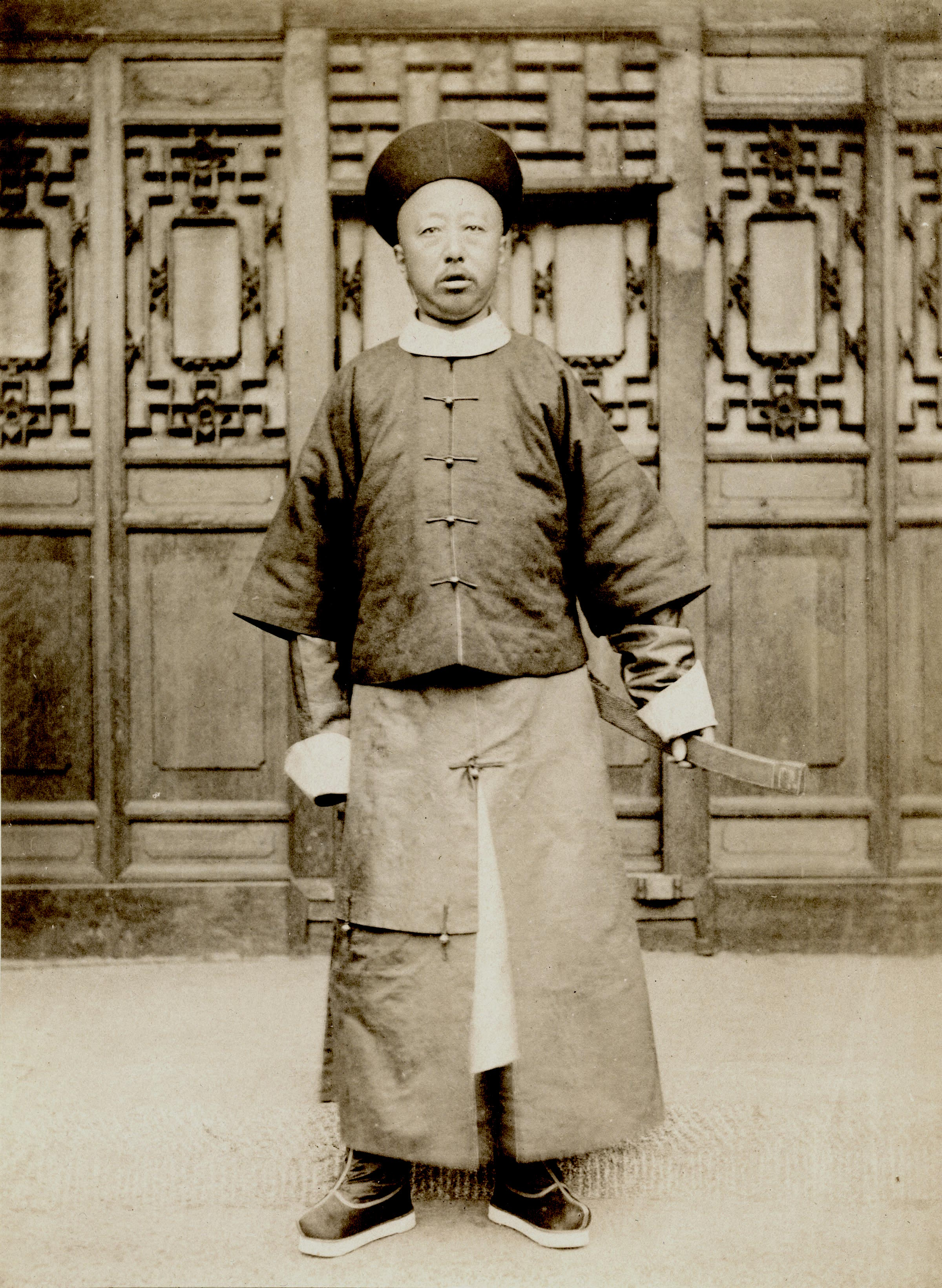
- Photographed in the 1870s

Prince Chun of the First Rank
- Tenure: 1872–1891
- Successor: Zaifeng
- Born: Aisin-Gioro Yixuan (愛新覺羅·奕譞); 16 October 1840 (道光二十年 九月 二十一日); Beijing
- Died: 1 January 1891 (aged 50) (光緒十六年 十一月 二十一日); Prince Chun Mansion
- Burial: Miaogaofeng, Western Hills
- Consorts: Yehe Nara Wanzhen (m. 1860–1891) Liugiya Cuiyan (m. 1883–1891)
- Issue: Guangxu Emperor; Zaifeng, Prince Chun of the First Rank; Zaixun; Zaitao
Names
- Aisin-Gioro Yixuan (愛新覺羅·奕譞); Manchu: I-Huwan (ᡳ ᡥᡠᠸᠠᠨ)
Posthumous name
- Prince Chunxian of the First Rank (醇賢親王)
- House: House of Aisin-Gioro
- Father: Daoguang Emperor
- Mother: Imperial Noble Consort Zhuangshun

Yixuan
- Chinese: 奕譞
Transcriptions
Standard Mandarin
- Hanyu Pinyin: Yìxuān
- Wade–Giles: I-hsüan

Prince Chun
- Traditional Chinese: 醇親王
- Simplified Chinese: 醇亲王
Transcriptions
Standard Mandarin
- Hanyu Pinyin: Chún Qīnwáng
- Wade–Giles: Ch'un Chin-wang

Yixuan (16 October 1840 – 1 January 1891), formally known as Prince Chun, was an imperial prince of the House of Aisin-Gioro and a statesman of the Manchu-led Qing dynasty in China. He holds a special place in Qing history as the son of the Daoguang Emperor, younger half-brother of the Xianfeng Emperor, father of the Guangxu Emperor (his second son) and through his fifth son Zaifeng, the paternal grandfather of the Xuantong Emperor (Puyi), the last Emperor of China.

== Family background ==
Yixuan was born in the Aisin-Gioro clan as the seventh son of the Daoguang Emperor. His mother was Imperial Noble Consort Zhuangshun of the Uya (烏雅氏) clan. Four months after his birth, Lady Uya, a who was recently promoted to "Noble Lady Lin" (琳貴人), was further elevated to the status of "Imperial Concubine Lin" (琳嬪), a rare distinction. Lady Uya's rapid rise through the ranks continued, and she was promoted to "Consort Lin" (琳妃) and "Noble Consort Lin" (琳貴妃) in 1842 and 1847 respectively. The Tongzhi Emperor granted her the posthumous title "Imperial Noble Consort Zhuangshun" (莊順皇貴妃).

In February 1850, after the Daoguang Emperor's death, Yixuan's fourth brother, Yizhu, ascended the throne and became historically known as the Xianfeng Emperor. The Xianfeng Emperor made Yixuan a junwang (second-rank prince) under the title "Prince Chun of the Second Rank" (醇郡王). Yixuan kept a low profile in politics throughout the Xianfeng Emperor's 11-year reign.

In 1860, by the Xianfeng Emperor's decree, Yixuan married Wanzhen of the Yehe Nara clan, who was the younger sister of Empress Dowager Cixi, who at that time was one of the Xianfeng Emperor's consorts. The marriage forged a close bond between Yixuan and Empress Dowager Cixi. The Xianfeng Emperor died in August 1861, leaving the throne to his five-year-old son, Zaichun, who would reign as the Tongzhi Emperor. On the Xianfeng Emperor's death, a power struggle emerged over the regency for the emperor, with one faction led by Sushun, and princes Duanhua and Zaiyuan, and another faction led by Yixuan's sixth brother, Prince Gong, as well as the Xianfeng Emperor's empress, honoured with the title of Empress Dowager Ci'an, and Noble Consort Yi, the mother of the new emperor, honored with the title of Empress Dowager Cixi. In November 1861, Yixuan sided with Prince Gong and the two dowager empresses and launched the Xinyou Coup to seize the regency from Sushun and his faction. Yixuan personally led imperial forces to arrest Sushun and bring him back to Beijing, where he was executed.

As a consequence of the Xinyou Coup, Yixuan found himself elevated to the highest ranks in the imperial court. In the 14-year reign of the Tongzhi Emperor from 1861 to 1875, he had a dual career in the military and civil services. In 1872, he was promoted from junwang (second-rank prince) to a qinwang (first-rank prince), hence he became known as "Prince Chun of the First Rank" (醇親王). In 1874, he was dismissed from office by the Tongzhi Emperor, along with Prince Gong, and several others, due to his involvement in a reprimand of the emperor for his poor conduct, only to be reinstated, along with the others, thanks to the intervention of the dowager empresses.

== During the Guangxu Emperor's reign ==
In January 1875, the Tongzhi Emperor died without an heir, so Empress Dowager Cixi chose Yixuan's second son, Zaitian, to be the new emperor. Zaitian was adopted into the Xianfeng Emperor's lineage; this meant that he was nominally no longer Yixuan's son. As the Xianfeng Emperor's "son", Zaitian was installed on the throne and became historically known as the Guangxu Emperor. This choice brought advantages to Cixi: Zaitian was her nephew (Zaitian's mother, Wanzhen, was Cixi's younger sister); Zaitian's father, Yixuan, had been a loyal supporter of Cixi; Zaitian was still young so Cixi could continue ruling as regent. As for Yixuan himself, however, Cixi's choice was a catastrophe for him. When he heard that his son had been chosen to be the new emperor, he reportedly hit himself and wept bitterly before sinking into unconsciousness.

In the last centuries of imperial China, it was very unusual for an emperor's father to be still alive while the emperor was reigning. The only prior example in the Qing dynasty was that of the situation between 1796 and 1799, when the Qianlong Emperor abdicated in favour of his 15th son, the Jiaqing Emperor, and became a taishang huang (retired emperor). Since filial piety is a highly revered value in Chinese culture, it meant that Yixuan, the biological father of the reigning emperor, would be endowed with the highest honours and privileges. However, Yixuan perceived himself to be in an extremely dangerous and uncomfortable position, given the prickly nature of Empress Dowager Cixi and her obsessional paranoia of any potential threat to her status.

The first decision that Yixuan made, after his son became the emperor, was to resign from all his official positions. He tried to keep a low profile but could not avoid being showered with honours and privileges, which he tried to decline as much as possible. Soon after his son became the emperor, Yixuan was awarded the "iron-cap" privilege, which meant that he could pass on his Prince Chun title to his descendants without the title being downgraded one grade per generation.

In 1876, Yixuan wrote a memorial to the Guangxu Emperor, condemning in advance anyone who would propose to grant him a special position in the hierarchy on the grounds that he was the emperor's biological father. Following resignation from his military and civil posts, he was entrusted with the education of the young emperor, to which he consented. In the following years, with the disgrace of his sixth brother Yixin (Prince Gong), Yixuan unwillingly became the second most powerful figure in the imperial court after Empress Dowager Cixi. The empress dowager even ordered all court officials to discuss matters with Yixuan before making decisions.

Empress Dowager Cixi's co-regent, Empress Dowager Ci'an, died suddenly in 1881 and was rumoured to have been poisoned by Cixi. This made Yixuan even more cautious and eager to please Cixi in all possible ways. When the Guangxu Emperor reached adulthood in early 1887 and was ready to take over the reins of power from Empress Dowager Cixi, Yixuan formally requested Cixi to prolong her regency.

In 1885, Empress Dowager Cixi appointed Yixuan as "Controller of the Admiralty", putting him in charge of supervising the building of a new imperial navy. Yixuan was sent on an inspection tour to the naval shipyards on the coast of China.

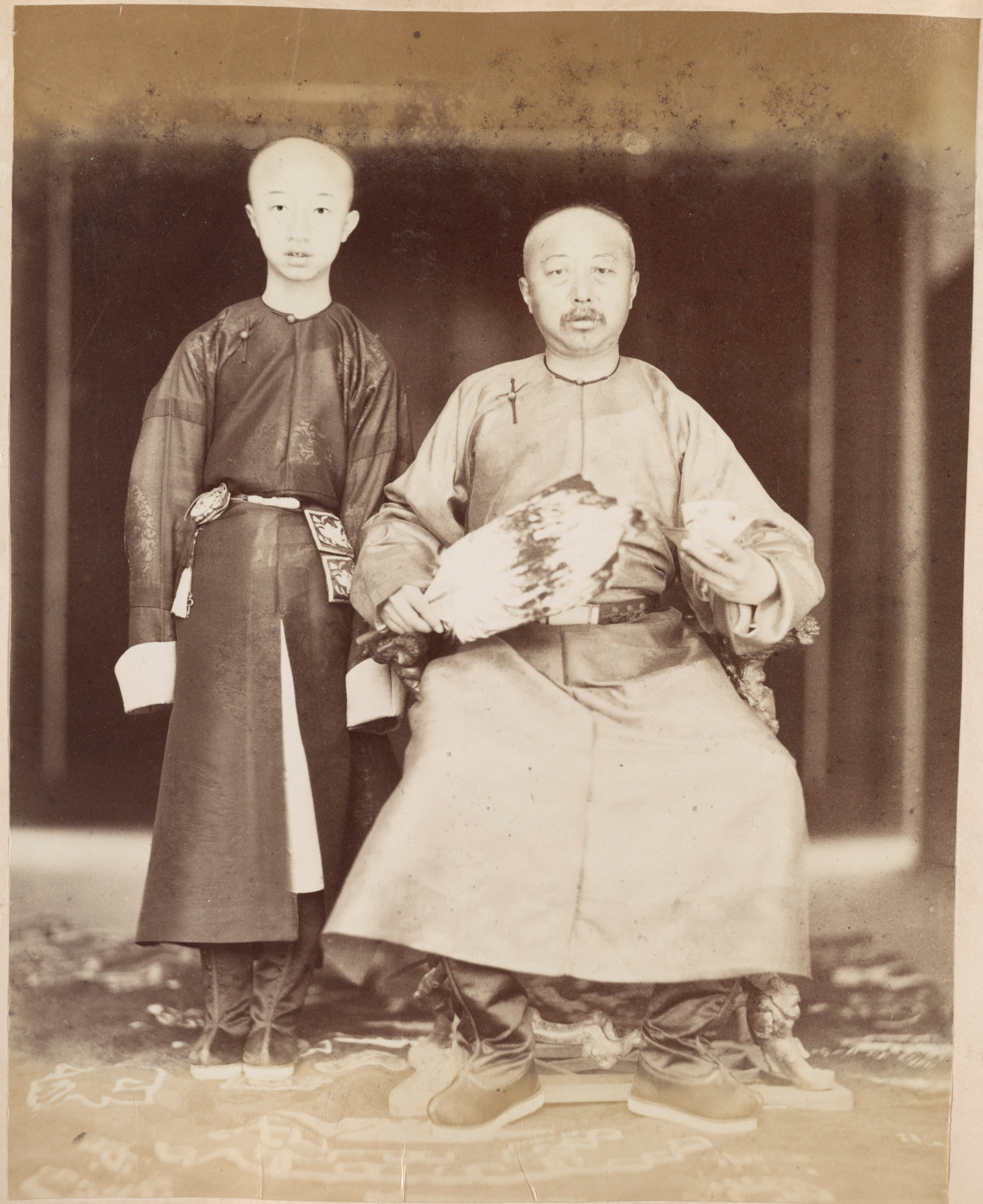
Yixuan with one of his younger son

Before her adopted son, Emperor Guangxu, took over the throne in 1889, Cixi wrote out explicit orders that the navy should continue to develop and expand gradually. However, after Cixi went into retirement, all naval and military development came to a drastic halt. Japan's victories over China has often been falsely rumored to be the fault of Cixi. Many believed that Cixi was the cause of the navy's defeat by embezzling funds from the navy in order to build the Summer Palace in Beijing. However, extensive research by Chinese historians revealed that Cixi was not the cause of the Chinese navy's decline. In actuality, China's defeat was caused by Emperor Guangxu's lack of interest in developing and maintaining the military. His close adviser, Grand Tutor Weng Tonghe, advised Guangxu to cut all funding to the navy and army, because he did not see Japan as a true threat, and there were several natural disasters during the early 1890s which the emperor thought to be more pressing to expend funds on.

Yixuan died on 1 January 1891, shortly before the enlargement works on the Summer Palace were completed. His fifth son, Zaifeng, inherited his title "Prince Chun of the First Rank". Yixuan was granted a posthumous name xian (賢), so his full posthumous title became "Prince Chunxian of the First Rank" (醇賢親王).

== Names and titles ==
- Names:
  - Clan name / family name: Aisin-Gioro (simplified Chinese: 爱新觉罗; traditional Chinese: 愛新覺羅; pinyin: Àixīnjuéluó)
  - Personal name: Yixuan (Chinese: 奕譞; pinyin: Yìxuān; Wade–Giles: I-hsüan)
  - Courtesy name: Pu'an (simplified Chinese: 朴菴; traditional Chinese: 樸菴; pinyin: Pǔ ān)
  - Pseudonym: Master of the Jiusi Hall (Chinese: 九思堂主人; pinyin: Jǐusītáng Zhǔrén) or Withdrawn Master (simplified Chinese: 退潜主人; traditional Chinese: 退潛主人; pinyin: Tuìqiǎn Zhǔrén)
- Titles:
  - Prince Chun of the Second Rank (Chinese: 醇郡王; pinyin: Chún Jùnwáng). Yixuan held this title from 1850 to 1872.
  - Prince Chun of the First Rank (simplified Chinese: 醇亲王; traditional Chinese: 醇親王; pinyin: Chún Qīnwáng), simplified to Prince Chun (or Prince Ch'un in Wade–Giles). Yixuan held this title from 1872 until his death in 1891.
  - Posthumous title (in full): Prince Chunxian of the First Rank (simplified Chinese: 醇贤亲王; traditional Chinese: 醇賢親王; pinyin: Chúnxián Qīnwáng)
- Other references:
  - Seventh Prince (simplified Chinese: 七王爷; traditional Chinese: 七王爺; pinyin: Qī Wángyé)

== Prince Chun Tomb ==
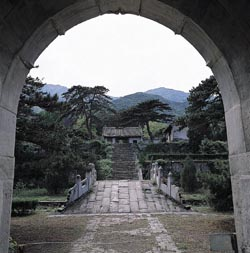
Tomb of Prince Chun

Yixuan was interred in a tomb of princely status, now popularly known as the "Seventh Prince's Grave" (七王墳), located 35 km/22 miles northwest of Beijing. According to Puyi's autobiography, a ginkgo tree grew on the tomb of Yixuan, and became very tall and imposing. This fact was reported to Empress Dowager Cixi and greatly alarmed her. In the Chinese language, the first character of the word "ginkgo tree" is bai (白), while the first character of the word "emperor" is huang (皇), which combines the character bai with the character wang (王 – meaning "prince", 親王). A ginkgo (白) growing on the tomb of Yixuan (王) was interpreted as a sign that a new emperor (皇) would emerge in the house of Yixuan. This was unacceptable for the very superstitious Cixi, as obsessed as ever with thwarting any challenge to her power, and so she promptly had the tree felled. The tomb of Yixuan was restored by the People's Republic of China after 1949 and is now one of the tourist attractions around Beijing.

The tomb and surrounding area appears in Quentin Tarantino's 2004 film Kill Bill: Volume 2 as the home and training grounds of the legendary Shaolin monk Pai Mei.

== Prince Chun Mansion ==
A former residence of Yixuan, now known as the Prince Chun Mansion, is located near Shichahai, Beijing.

== Family ==
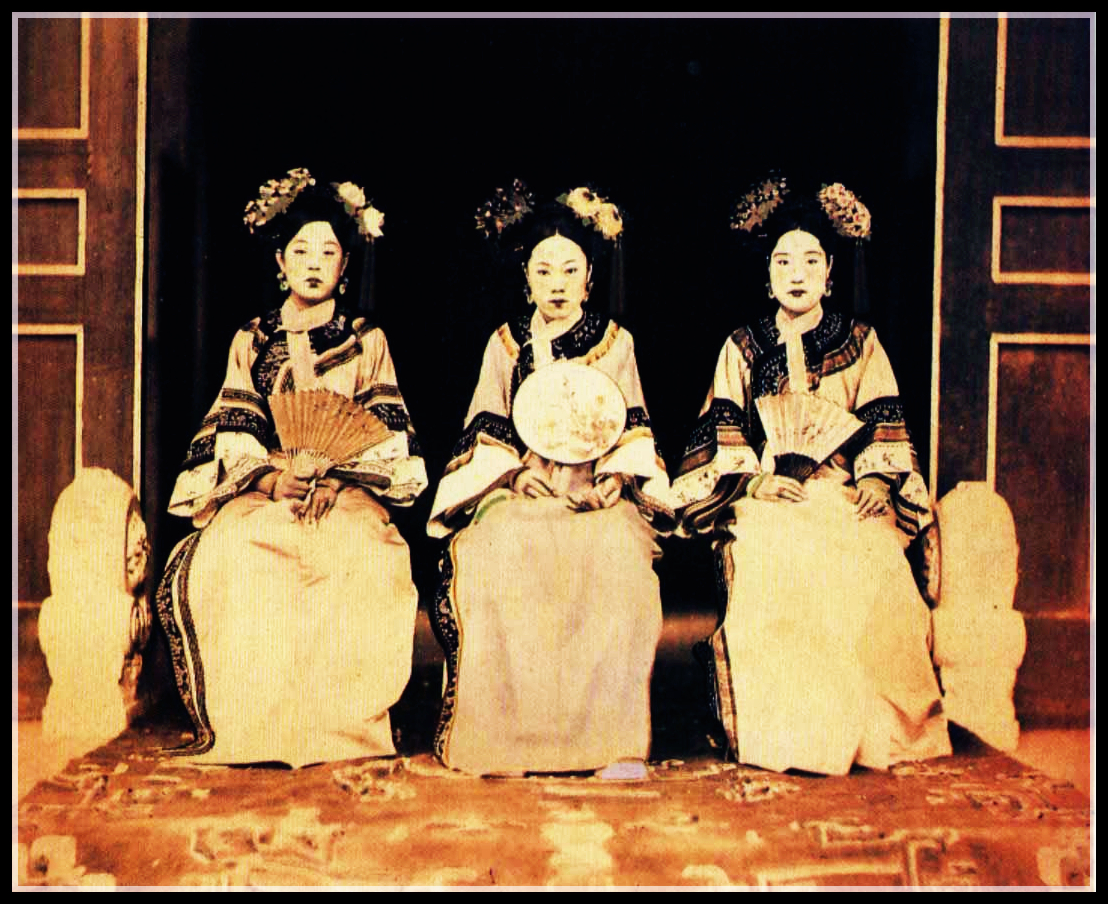
Yixuan's consorts

Primary Consort

- Wanzhen, Imperial Princess Consort Chunxian of the Yehe Nara clan (醇賢亲王福晋 葉赫那拉氏; 13 September 1841 – 17 June 1896)
  - First daughter (11 April 1861 – 24 November 1866)
  - Zaihan (載瀚; 4 February 1865 – 9 December 1866), first son
  - Zaitian, the Guangxu Emperor (德宗 載湉; 14 August 1871 – 14 November 1908), second son
  - Third son (13 February 1875 – 14 February 1875)
  - Zaiguang (載洸; 27 November 1880 – 18 May 1884), fourth son

Secondary Consorts

- Yujuan, Secondary Consort of the Yanzha clan (側福晉 顏扎氏; 1845–1881)
- Cuiyan, Secondary Consort of the Liugiya clan (側福晉 劉佳氏 翠妍; 1867–1925)
  - Zaifeng, Prince Chun of the First Rank (醇親王 載灃; 12 February 1883 – 3 February 1951), fifth son
  - Second daughter (31 January 1884 – 24 June 1885)
  - Zaixun, Prince of the Third Rank (貝勒 載洵; 20 May 1885 – 30 March 1949), sixth son
  - Zaitao, Prince of the Third Rank (貝勒 載濤; 23 June 1887 – 2 September 1970), seventh son
- Daniu, Secondary Consort of the Ligiya clan (側福晉 李佳氏; 1869–1927)
  - Lady of the First Rank (郡君; 23 November 1887 – 13 December 1914), third daughter
    - Married Songchun (松椿; d. 1927) of the Manchu Fuca clan in September/October 1905

== See also ==
- Royal and noble ranks of the Qing dynasty
- Ranks of Imperial Consorts in China#Qing

Yixuan, Prince Chun Qing dynasty Born: 16 October 1840 Died: 1 January 1891
Chinese nobility
New title	Prince Chun; 1872–1891	Succeeded by Zaifeng
