= Prince Zhi (直) =

Qing dynasty princely peerage

Prince Zhi of the Second Rank
- Traditional Chinese: 多羅直郡王
- Simplified Chinese: 多罗直郡王
Transcriptions
Standard Mandarin
- Hanyu Pinyin: duōluó zhí jùnwáng
- Wade–Giles: to-lo chih chün-wang

Prince Zhi of the Second Rank, or simply Prince Zhi, was the title of a princely peerage used in China during the Manchu-led Qing dynasty (1644–1912). As the Prince Zhi peerage was not awarded "iron-cap" status, this meant that each successive bearer of the title would normally start off with a title downgraded by one rank vis-à-vis that held by his predecessor. However, the title would generally not be downgraded to any lower than a feng'en fuguo gong except under special circumstances.

The first bearer of the title was Yunzhi (1672–1735), the eldest son of the Kangxi Emperor. In 1698, Yunzhi was granted the title "Prince Zhi of the Second Rank" by his father. The title was passed down over three generations and held by three persons.

== Members of the Prince Zhi peerage ==
- Yunzhi (1672–1735), the Kangxi Emperor's eldest son, held the title Prince Zhi of the Second Rank from 1698 to 1708, stripped of his title in 1708, given a funeral befitting a beizi in 1735
  - Hongfang (弘昉; 1704–1772), Yunzhi's second son, held the title of a feng'en zhenguo gong from 1735 to 1772
    - Yongyang (永揚; 1747–1777), Hongfang's ninth son, held the title of a feng'en fuguo gong in 1773 but was stripped of his title within the same year, had no male heir
    - Yongping (永㺸; 1723–1771), Hongfang's son
      - Mianliang (綿亮; 1750–1774), Yongping's son
    - Yongtuo (永𤣯; 1727–1780), Hongfang's son
      - Mianhao (綿灝; 1747–1807), Yongtuo's son
        - Yigui (奕貴; 1768–1799), Mianhao's son
          - Zaimou (載謀; 1795–1854), Yigui's son
            - Puqi (溥麒; 1825–1878), Zaimou's son
              - Yubao (毓葆; 1874–?), Puqi's son and Pujia's adopted son
              - Hengyuan (恆元; 1911–?), Yubao's son and Yuying's adopted son, held the title of a feng'en jiangjun from 1917
            - Pulin (溥麟; 1822–1895), Zaimou's son
              - Yuying (毓英; 1870–1915), Pulin's son, held the title of a feng'en jiangjun from 1889 to 1915, had no male heir
            - Purui (溥瑞; 1828–1862), Zaimou's son and Yizhang's adopted grandson, held the title of a feng'en jiangjun from 1848 to 1862
              - Yuquan (毓荃; 1871–1889), Purui's son, held the title of a feng'en jiangjun from 1862 to 1889
      - Mianrong (綿蓉; 1752–1804), Yongtuo's son
        - Yixi (奕璽; 1777–1836), Mianrong's son
          - Zaima (載禡; 1813–1841), Yixi's son
      - Mianbi (綿比; 1762–1823), Yongtuo's son and Yongyang's adopted son
        - Yijiang (奕江; 1793–1872), Mianbi's eldest son
          - Zaizhen (載振; 1824–1856), Yijiang's son
            - Pujia (溥佳; 1845–1876), Zaizhen's eldest son
    - Yongmou (永𤣳; 1728–1760), Hongfang's son
      - Miannai (綿鼐; 1748–1780), Yong-?'s son
  - Hongxiang (弘晌; 1718–1781), Yunzhi's 12th son, held the title of a feng'en jiangjun from 1773 to 1781
    - Yongduo (永多; 1740–1809), Hongxiang's eldest son, held the title of a feng'en jiangjun from 1781 to 1809
      - Miangen (綿亘; 1761–1803), Yongduo's son
        - Yizhang (奕章; 1796–1850), Miangen's eldest son, held the title of a feng'en jiangjun from 1809 to 1848, had no male heir

== Family tree ==
adoption
Yunzhi 允禔 (1672–1735); Prince Zhi of the Second Rank 直郡王 (1698–1708) (stripped of his title)
Hongfang 弘昉 (?–1772); Feng'en Zhenguo Gong 奉恩鎮國公 (1735–1772)	Hongxiang 弘晌 (1718–1781); Feng'en Jiangjun 奉恩將軍 (1773–1781)
Yongping 永㺸 (1723–1771)	Yongtuo 永𤣯 (1727–1780)	Yong-? 永𤣳 (1728–1760)	Yongyang 永揚 (1747–1777); Feng'en Fuguo Gong 奉恩輔國公 (1773) (stripped of his title)	Yongduo 永多 (1740–1809); Feng'en Jiangjun 奉恩將軍 (1781–1809)
Mianliang 綿亮 (1750–1774)	Mianhao 綿灝 (1747–1807)	Mianrong 綿蓉 (1752–1804)	Mianbi 綿比 (1762–1823)	Miannai 綿鼐 (1748–1780)	Miangen 綿亘 (1761–1803)
Yigui 奕貴 (1768–1799)	Yixi 奕璽 (1777–1836)	Yijiang 奕江 (1793–1872)	Yizhang 奕章 (1796–1850); Feng'en Jiangjun 奉恩將軍 (1809–1848)
Zaimou 載謀 (1795–1854)	Zaima 載禡 (1813–1841)	Zaizhen 載振 (1824–1856)
Pulin 溥麟 (1822–1895)	Puqi 溥麒 (1825–1878)	Purui 溥瑞 (1828–1862); Feng'en Jiangjun 奉恩將軍 (1848–1862)	Pujia 溥佳 (1845–1876)
Yuying 毓英 (1870–1915); Feng'en Jiangjun 奉恩將軍 (1889–1915)	Yuquan 毓荃 (1871–1889); Feng'en Jiangjun 奉恩將軍 (1862–1889)	Yubao 毓葆 (1874–?)
Hengyuan 恆元 (1911–?); Feng'en Jiangjun 奉恩將軍 (1917–?)

== See also ==
- Prince Fu
- Royal and noble ranks of the Qing dynasty
