= Prince Yu (愉) =

Qing peerage

Prince Yu of the Second Rank
- Traditional Chinese: 多羅愉郡王
- Simplified Chinese: 多罗愉郡王
Transcriptions
Standard Mandarin
- Hanyu Pinyin: duōluó yù jùnwáng
- Wade–Giles: to-lo yü chün-wang

Prince Yu of the Second Rank, or simply Prince Yu, was the title of a princely peerage used in China during the Manchu-led Qing dynasty (1644–1912). As the Prince Yu peerage was not awarded "iron-cap" status, this meant that each successive bearer of the title would normally start off with a title downgraded by one rank vis-à-vis that held by his predecessor. However, the title would generally not be downgraded to any lower than a feng'en fuguo gong except under special circumstances.

The first bearer of the title was Yunxu (允禑; 1693–1731), the 15th son of the Kangxi Emperor. In 1730, Yunxu was granted the title "Prince Yu of the Second Rank" by the Qianlong Emperor. The title was passed down over seven generations and held by seven persons.

== Members of the Prince Yu peerage ==
- Yunxu (允禑; 1693 – 1731; 1st), the Kangxi Emperor's 15th son, initially a beile, promoted to second-rank prince under the title "Prince Yu of the Second Rank" in 1730, posthumously honoured as Prince Yu Ke of the Second Rank (愉恪郡王)
  - Hongqing (弘慶; 1724 – 1769; 2nd), Yunxu's third son, held the title Prince Yu of the Second Rank from 1731 to 1769, posthumously honoured as Prince Yu Gong of the Second Rank (愉恭郡王)
    - Yongjian (永珔; 1766 – 1820; 3rd), Hongqing's eldest son, held the title of a beile from 1770 to 1820
      - Mianxiu (綿岫; 1782 – 1850; 4th), Yongjian's eldest son, made a defender general in 1802, held the title of a beizi from 1821 to 1850
        - Yisu (奕橚; 1808 – 1866; 5th), Mianxiu's eldest son, made a second class fuguo jiangjun in 1829, held the title of a grace defender duke from 1850 to 1866
          - Zaixia (載霞; 1860 – 1922), Yiqiao's eldest son and Puzhao's father, held the title of a grace general from 1875 to 1882
            - Puzhao (溥釗; 1885– 1937; 7th), Zaixia's third son and Zaican's adopted son, held the title of a feng'en fuguo gong from 1885 to 1937
              - Yuchun (毓純; 1905 – 1906), Puzhao's son
          - Zaican (載璨; 1838 – 1885; 6th), Yisu's second son, made a bulwark duke in 1857, held the title of a grace bulwark duke from 1866 to 1885

=== Cadet members ===
==== Yunxu's cadet line ====
- Hongfu (弘富; 1727 – 1783), Yunxu's fourth son, held the title of a third class defender duke from 1749 to 1783
  - Yongbo (永浡), Hongfu's third son, held the title of a bulwark general from 1784 to 1818
    - Mianfen (綿鈖), Yongbo's eldest son, held the title of a grace general from 1790 to 1818, held the title of a fengguo jiangjun from 1818 to 1821
      - Yiyuan (奕元), Mianfen's eldest son, held the title of a grace general from 1821 to 1851
        - Zaiyu (載裕), Yiyuan's eldest son, held the title of a grace general from 1858 to 1862, stripped of his title in 1862

==== Hongqing's cadet line ====
- Yongle (永勒), Hongqing's second son, held the title of a grace general from 1790 to 1799, had no male heir

==== Yongjian's cadet line ====
- Mianjun (綿峻), Yongjian's second son, held the title of a defender duke from 1802 to 1843
  - Yizhang (奕樟), Mianjun's second son, held the title of a third class bulwark general from 1843 to 1884
    - Zaiwen (載雯), Yizhang's eldest son, held the title of a grace general from 1878 to 1883, had no male heir
- Mianqi (綿岐), Yongjian's fifth son, held the title of a bulwark general from 1812 to 1831
  - Yiqian (奕棈), Mianqi's fourth son, held the title of a supporter general from 1831 to 1890, had no male heir
- Miankun (綿崑; 1792–1831), Yongjian's sixth son, held the title of a second class defender general from 1812 to 1831
  - Yidong (奕棟; 1812–1872), Miankun's eldest son, held the title of a bulwark duke from 1832 to 1872
    - Zaisou (載搜), Yidong's eldest son, held the title of a supporter general from 1857 to 1859, stripped of his title in 1859
    - Zaizang (載臧), Yidong's second son, held the title of a supporter general from 1873 to 1875, had no male heir
  - Yitong (奕桶), Miankun's third son, held the title of a third class bulwark general from 1844 to 1862
- Mianlun (綿崙), Yongjian's seventh son, held the title of a first class bulwark general from 1812 to 1840
  - Yijie (奕傑), Mianlun's eldest son, held the title of a supporter general from 1836 to 1878
    - Zaizhao (載照), Yijie's second son, held the title of a grace general from 1878
- Miangang (綿崗), Yongjian's eighth son, held the title of a first class bulwark general from 1812 to 1841
  - Yifang (奕芳), Miangang's second son, held the title of a supporter general from 1841 to 1844, had no male heir
- Mianfeng (綿峯), Yongjian's ninth son, held the title of a bulwark general from 1821 to 1847
  - Yibin (奕彬), Mianfeng's eldest son, held the title of a supporter general from 1847 to 1888
- Mianlong (綿巃; 1806 – 1873), Yongjian's tenth son, held the title of a bulwark general from 1826 to 1873
  - Yiqiao (奕樵; 1838 – 1875), Mianlong's eldest son, held the title of a supporter general from 1873 to 1875
    - Zaixia (載霞; 1860 – 1922), Yiqiao's eldest son and Puzhao's father, held the title of a grace general from 1875 to 1882
      - Pusu (溥宿), Zaixia's eldest son, held the title of a grace general

=== Mianxiu's cadet line ===
- Yicheng (奕棖), Mianxiu's third son, held the title of a second class bulwark general from 1857 to 1887
  - Zailin (載霖), Yicheng's eldest son, held the title of a supporter general from 1868 to 1889, had no male heir
  - Zaiguang (載光), Yicheng's fourth son, held the title of a supporter general from 1877
    - Pupei (溥培), Zaiguang's eldest son, held the title of a grace general from 1906
  - Zaiyan (載燕), Yicheng's sixth son, held the title of a supporter general from 1877 to 1911
    - Puping (溥坪), Zaiyan's eldest son, held the title of a grace general from 1906
- Yiqiu (奕楸), Mianxiu's fourth son, held the title of a second class bulwark general from 1857 to 1864, had no male heir
- Yigen (奕根), Mianxiu's sixth son, held the title of a grace general from 1857 to 1861, had no male heir
- Yi'nan (奕楠), Mianxiu's eighth son, held the title of a grace general from 1868 to 1884
  - Zaizhuang (載莊), Yi'nan's second son and Yilei's adopted son, held the title of a grace general (as Yi'nan's line) from 1890 and another grace general title (as Yilei's heir) from 1902
- Yilei (奕櫑), Mianxiu's ninth son, held the title of a grace general from 1868 to 1870, had no male heir

=== Yisu's cadet line ===
- Zaixiu (載烋), Yisu's eldest son, held the title of a first class bulwark duke from 1857 to 1859, had no male heir

== Family tree ==
adoption
Yunxu 允禑 (1693–1731); Prince Yuke of the Second Rank 愉恪郡王 (1730–1731)
Hongqing 弘慶 (1724–1769); Prince Yugong of the Second Rank 愉恭郡王 (1731–1769)
Yongjian 永珔 (1766–1820); Beile 貝勒 (1770–1820)
Mianxiu 綿岫 (1782–1850); Beizi 貝子 (1821–1850)	Mianlong 綿巃 (1806–1873); Fuguo Jiangjun 輔國將軍 (1826–1873)
Yisu 奕橚 (1808–1866); Feng'en Zhenguo Gong 奉恩鎮國公 (1850–1866)	Yiqiao 奕樵 (1838–1875); Fengguo Jiangjun 奉國將軍 (1873–1875)
Zaican 載璨 (1838–1885); Feng'en Fuguo Gong 奉恩輔國公 (1866–1885)	Zaixia 載霞 (1860–1922); Feng'en Jiangjun 奉恩將軍 (1875–1882)
Puzhao 溥釗 (1885–1937); Feng'en Fuguo Gong 奉恩輔國公 (1885–1937)

== See also ==
- Prince Hui (first rank)
- Prince Fu
- Royal and noble ranks of the Qing dynasty
