= Yunzhi, Prince Zhi =

Yinzhi
- Prince Zhi of the Second Rank 多羅直郡王

Prince Zhi of the Second Rank
- Tenure: 12 April 1698 – 12 December 1708
- Predecessor: peerage created
- Successor: Hongfang
- Born: Aisin Gioro Baoqing (愛新覺羅·保清); 12 March 1672
- Died: 7 January 1735 (aged 62)
- Consorts: Lady Irgen Gioro; Lady Zhang
- Issue: Hongyu; Hongfang; Honghan; Hongdi; Hongshang; Hongtong; Hongming; Hongtun; Princess of the Third Rank; Princess of the Third Rank; Lady of the Second Rank; Lady of the Second Rank; Lady of the Second Rank; Lady of the Second Rank; Lady of the Second Rank; Lady of the Second Rank; Princess of the Third Rank; Lady of the Second Rank
Names
- Aisin Gioro Yunti (愛新覺羅·允禔)
- House: Aisin Gioro
- Father: Kangxi Emperor
- Mother: Consort Hui

Yinzhi
- Chinese: 胤禔
Transcriptions
Standard Mandarin
- Hanyu Pinyin: Yìnzhī

Yunzhi
- Chinese: 允禔
Transcriptions
Standard Mandarin
- Hanyu Pinyin: Yǔnzhī

Yinzhi (12 March 1672 – 7 January 1735), also known as Yunzhi, formally known as Prince Zhi of the Second Rank between 1698 and 1708, was a Manchu prince of the Qing dynasty.

== Life ==
Yinzhi was born in the Aisin Gioro clan as the fifth son of the Kangxi Emperor. His mother was Consort Hui (惠妃) from the Yehe Nara (葉赫那拉) clan as well as a relative of the eminent official, Mingju. As the Kangxi Emperor's first four sons died prematurely, and Yinzhi was the emperor's eldest son to survive into adulthood, he was designated by his father as "First Prince" (大阿哥). In 1698, he was granted a junwang (second-rank prince) title as "Prince Zhi of the Second Rank" (多羅直郡王).

Yinzhi participated in the Qing Empire's campaign against Galdan Boshugtu Khan of the Zunghar Khanate. In 1708, the Kangxi Emperor removed Yinreng from his position as Crown Prince. The emperor regarded Yinzhi highly so he placed Yinreng under Yinzhi's custody. Yinzhi had long harboured the intention of seizing the succession to the throne, so he used the opportunity to urge his father to execute Yinreng, but his father became extremely displeased. Later, Yinzhi's third brother, Yinzhi (胤祉), spread rumours accusing the First Prince of using sorcery to overthrow Yinreng from his Crown Prince position. The Kangxi Emperor believed the rumours and was so furious with his eldest son that he called him a "treacherous subject", stripped him off his princely title, and placed him under house arrest.

When the Kangxi Emperor died in 1722, his fourth son, Yinzhen, succeeded him and became historically known as the Yongzheng Emperor. Yinzhi changed his name to "Yunzhi" to avoid naming taboo because the Chinese character for "Yin" (胤) in "Yinzhi" is the same as the one in the Yongzheng Emperor's personal name "Yinzhen" (胤禛). Yunzhi died in 1735 and was given a funeral befitting that of a beizi.

== Family ==
Primary Consort

- First primary consort, of the Irgen Gioro clan (嫡福晉 伊爾根覺羅氏)
  - Princess of the Third Rank (郡主; 29 October 1688 – July/August 1711), first daughter
    - Married Duo'erjiseleng (多爾濟色稜) of the Khorchin in April/May 1706
  - Princess of the Third Rank (郡主; 16 August 1689 – June/July 1716), second daughter
    - Married Li Shu'ao (李淑鰲) in September/October 1707
  - Lady of the Second Rank (縣君; 9 April 1691 – February/March 1723), third daughter
    - Married Labutan (喇布坦) of the Kakai (喀凱) clan in April/May 1714
  - Lady of the Second Rank (縣君; 1 September 1692 – March/April 1711), fourth daughter
    - Married Sun Cheng'en (孫承恩) in February/March 1710
  - Hongyu (弘昱; 25 October 1696 – 12 February 1718), first son
- Second primary consort, of the Zhang clan (嫡福晉 張氏)
  - Hongwei (弘暐; 25 August 1705 – 17 April 1710), third son
  - Hongyao (弘曜; 4 February 1707 – 8 May 1710), fourth son
  - Eighth son (4 December 1710 – 23 July 1711)
  - Lady of the Second Rank (縣君; 18 January 1713 – 11 October 1788), eighth daughter
    - Married Luobocangdunduobo (羅蔔藏敦多卜) of the Khorchin Borjigit clan in November/December 1733

Concubine

- Mistress, of the Uya clan (烏雅氏)
  - Lady of the Second Rank (縣君; 6 December 1703 – 19 May 1768), fifth daughter
    - Married Sailengnamuzha'er (塞楞納穆扎爾) of the Khorchin in December 1722 or January 1723
  - Tenth son (12 March 1716 – 16 June 1720)
- Mistress, of the Wang clan (王氏)
  - Hongfang, Duke of the First Rank (鎮國公 弘昉; 10 September 1704 – 28 December 1772), second son
- Mistress, of the Guan clan (關氏)
  - Fifth son (4 October 1709 – 5 March 1711)
- Mistress, of the Qian clan (錢氏)
  - Honghan (弘晗; 19 December 1709 – 20 January 1755), sixth son
- Mistress, of the Ruan clan (阮氏)
  - Hongdi (弘旳; 11 January 1710 – 28 July 1742), seventh son
- Mistress, of the Li clan (李氏)
  - Sixth daughter (28 December 1710 – July/August 1714)
- Mistress, of the Chao clan (晁氏)
  - Seventh daughter (14 January 1711 – December 1736)
    - Married Laxi (拉錫) of the Aohan Borjigit clan in September/October 1734
- Mistress, of the Guo clan (郭氏)
  - Lady of the Second Rank (縣君; 21 May 1715 – 6 December 1750), ninth daughter
    - Married Ji'erdi (吉爾第) of the Khorchin Borjigit clan in November/December 1734
  - Lady of the Second Rank (縣君; 14 August 1717 – 16 October 1755), tenth daughter
    - Married Wangzha'er (汪扎爾) Aohan Borjigit clan in August/September 1733
  - 11th daughter (29 August 1721 – April/May 1722)
  - 12th daughter (11 May 1723 – 25 January 1725)
  - Lady of the Second Rank (縣君; 22 September 1725 – 7 December 1751), 14th daughter
    - Married Jilalida (吉喇里達) of the Khorchin Borjigit clan in January/February 1746
- Mistress, of the Guo clan (郭氏)
  - Ninth son (15 October 1715 – 18 March 1720)
  - Hongtong (弘晍; 30 June 1723 – 10 June 1760), 13th son
- Mistress, of the Jin clan (晉氏)
  - 11th son (8 July 1716 – 30 April 1719)
  - Princess of the Third Rank (郡主; 6 August 1724 – 21 August 1793), 13th daughter
  - Hongming (弘明; 5 April 1732 – 25 November 1806), 14th son
- Mistress, of the Gao clan (高氏)
  - Hongxiang, General of the Fourth Rank (奉恩將軍 弘晌; 20 March 1718 – 8 April 1781), 12th son
- Mistress, of the Fan clan (范氏)
  - Hongtun (弘旽; 18 November 1732 – 6 July 1805), 15th son

== In fiction and popular culture ==
- Portrayed by Yang Xiaobo in Scarlet Heart (2011)

== See also ==
- Prince Zhi (直)
- Royal and noble ranks of the Qing dynasty
- Ranks of imperial consorts in China § Qing
