= Tsinghua Garden =

Garden in Haidian District, Beijing, China

Coordinates: 39.982264°N 116.339379°E

- Traditional Chinese: 清華園
- Simplified Chinese: 清华园
Transcriptions
Standard Mandarin
- Hanyu Pinyin: Qīnghuá Yuán

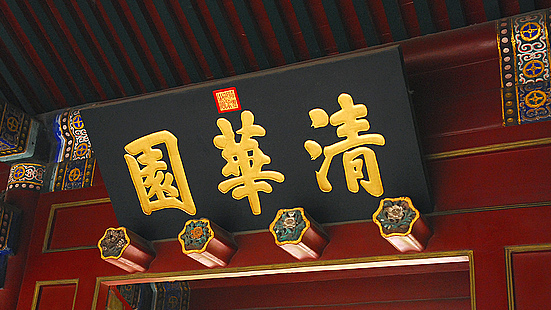
The plaque of Tsinghua Garden

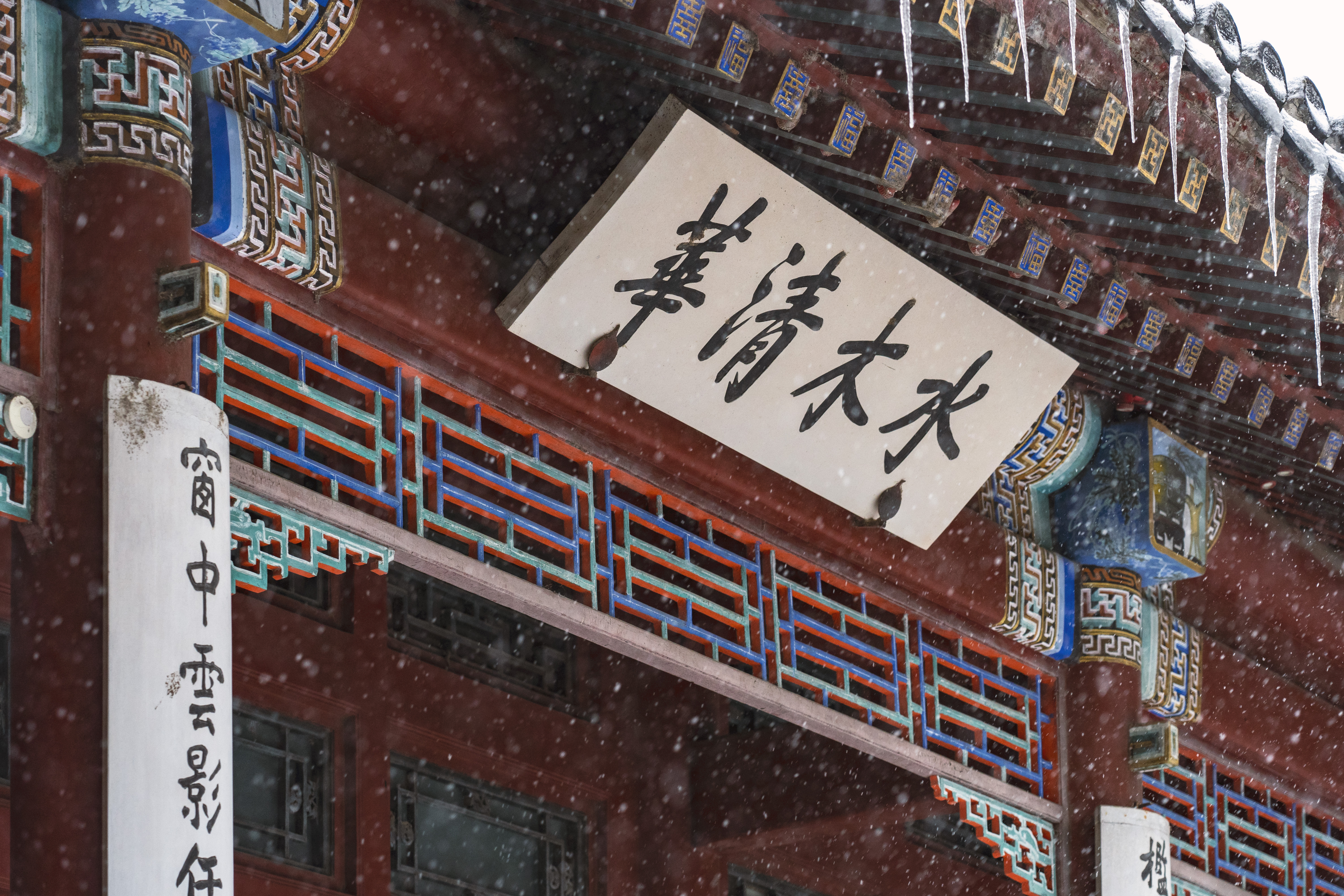
The plaque of "Shui Mu Qing Hua"

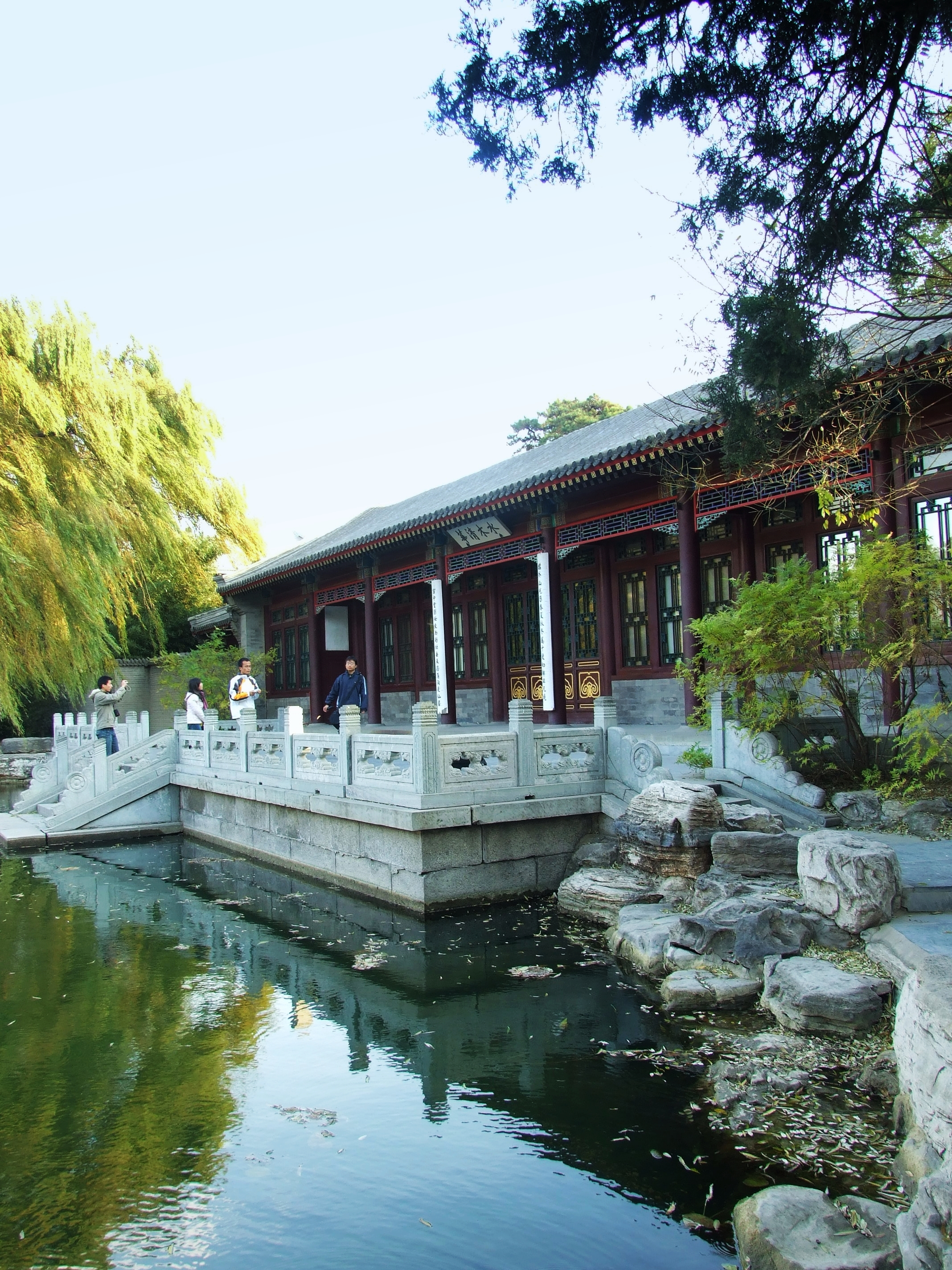
"Shui Mu Qing Hua" (水木清華), one of the attractions in Tsinghua Garden

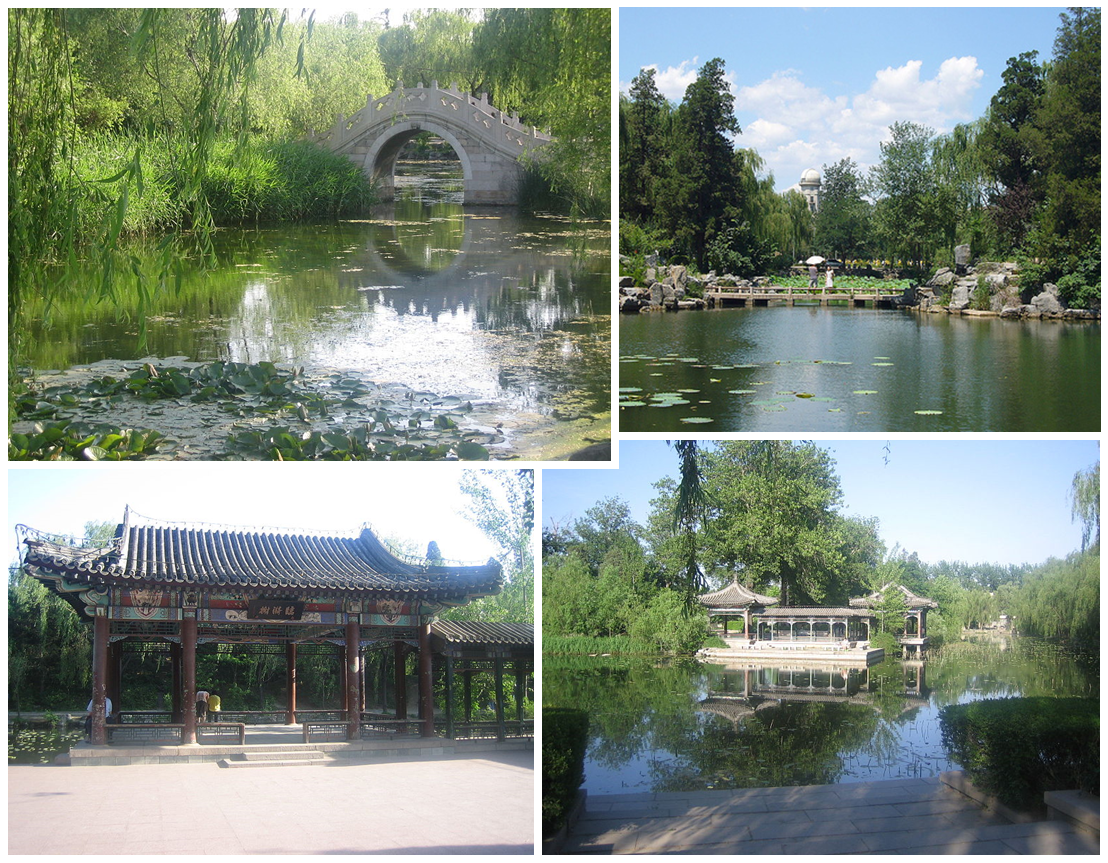
Overview of the place

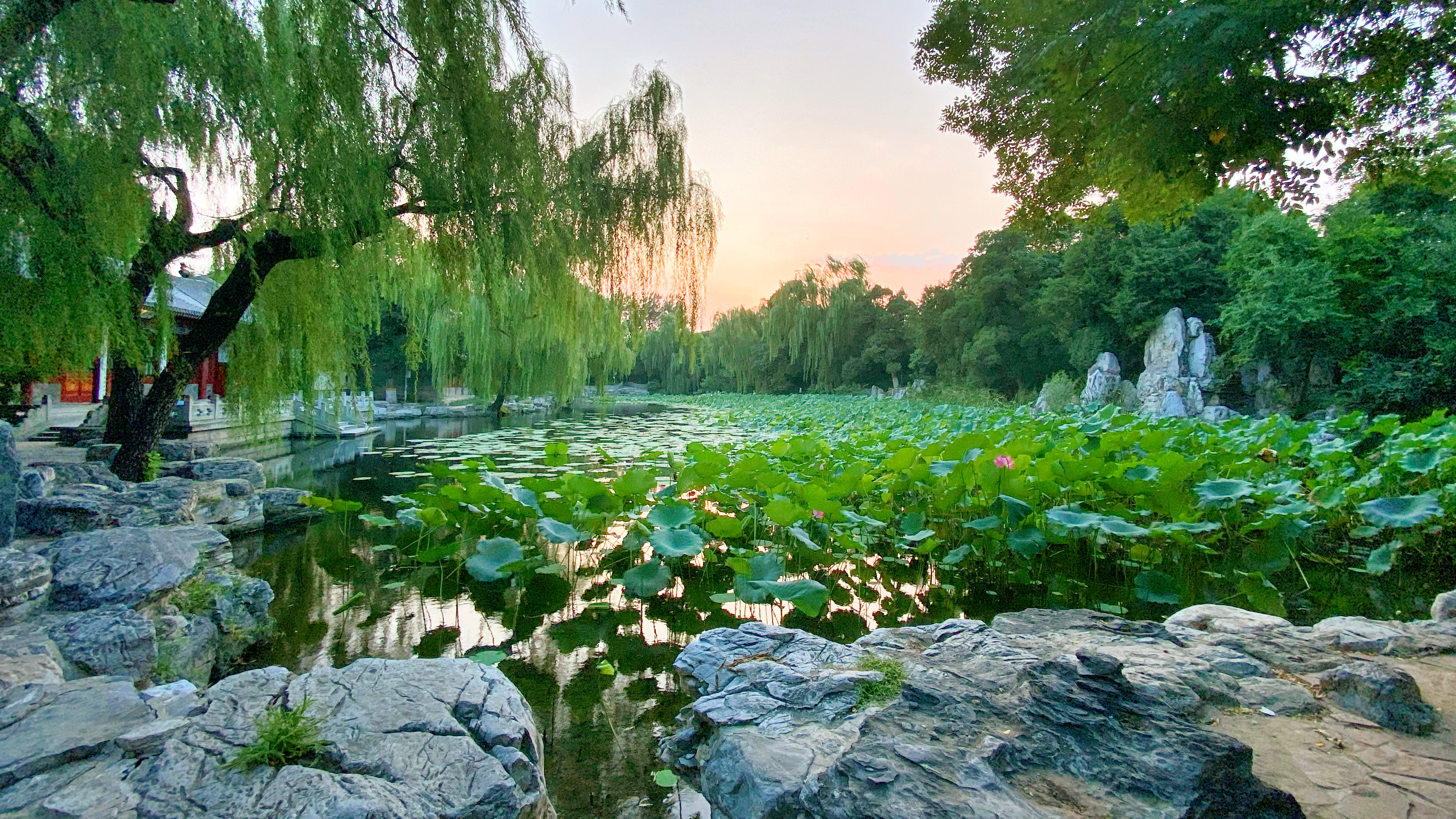
The "Shui Mu Qing Hua" pond

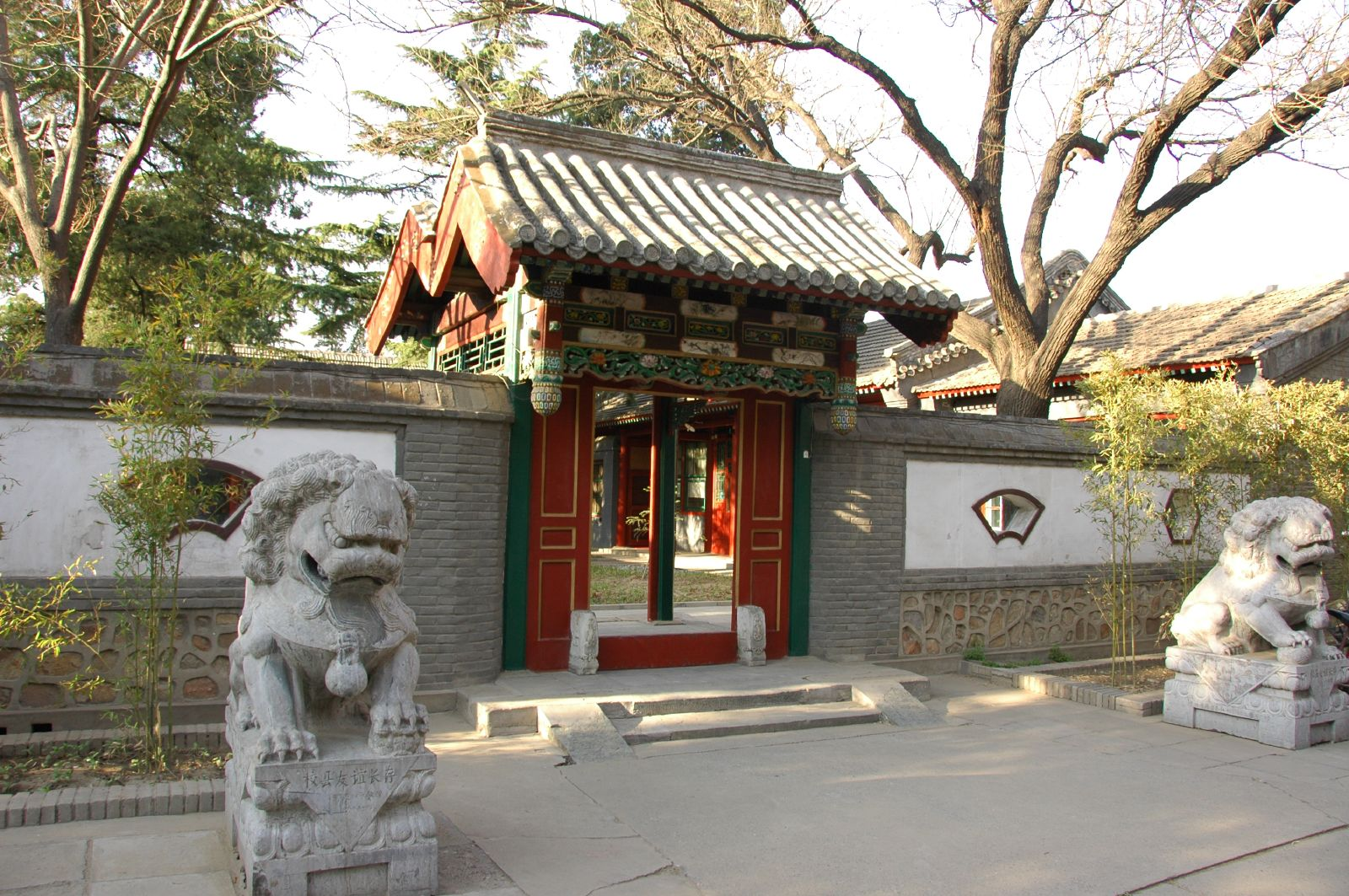
Entrance to the "工"-Shaped Hall

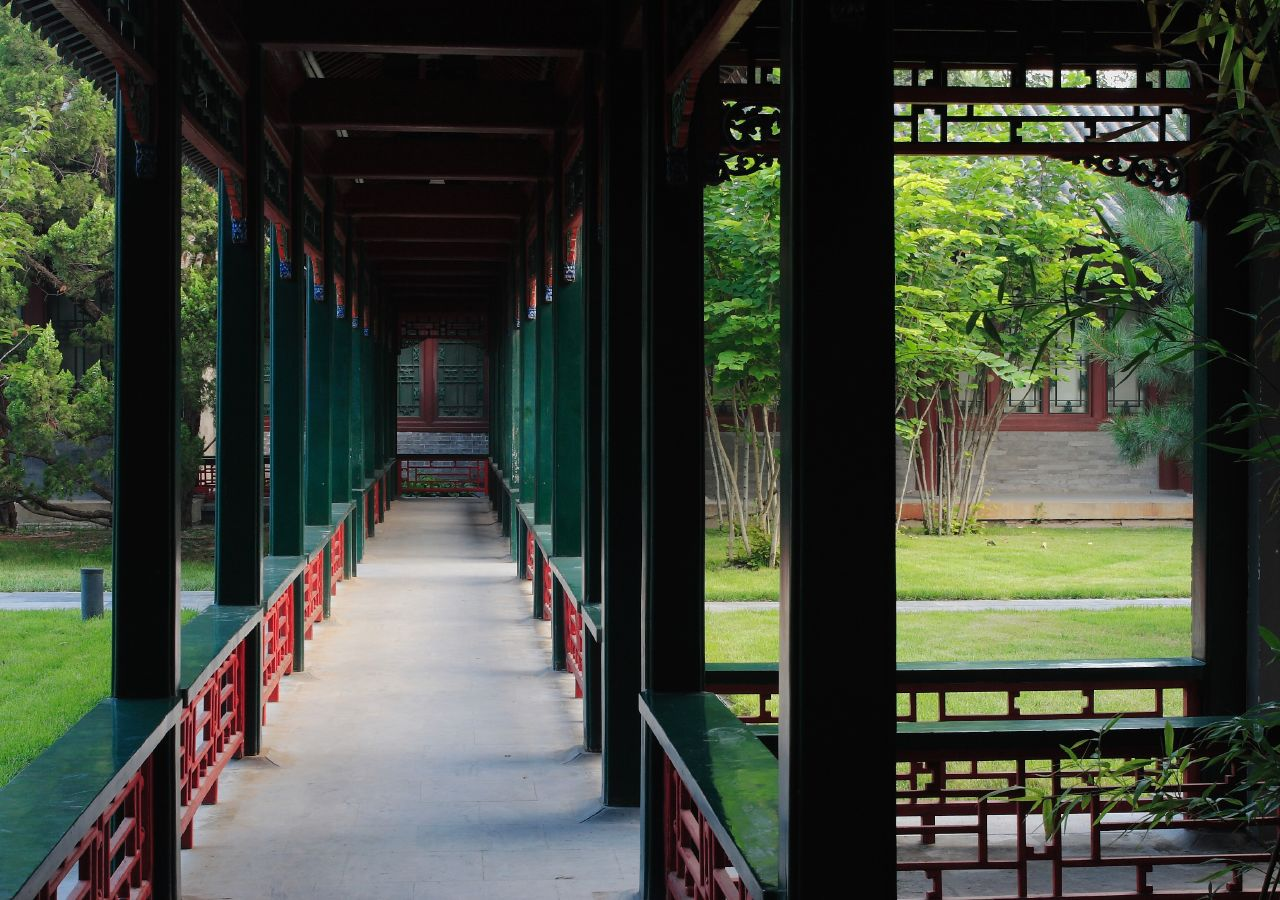
The corridor of the "工"-Shaped Hall

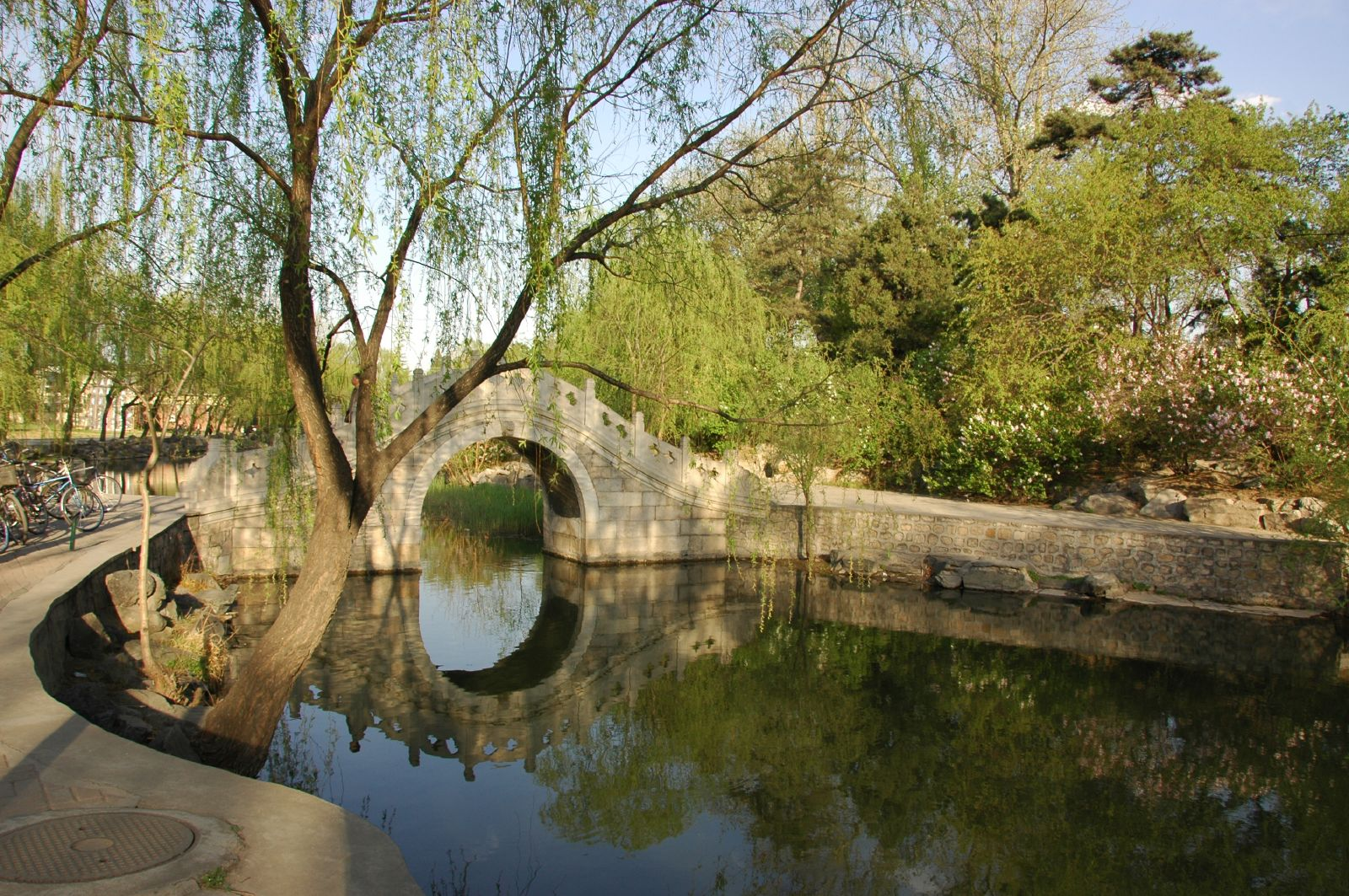
An arched bridge

Tsinghua Garden (traditional Chinese: 清華園; simplified Chinese: 清华园; pinyin: Qīnghuá Yuán) is an extensive garden in Haidian District, Beijing, China. Though the area has been called "Tsinghua Garden" since 1852, it actually encompasses a few earlier Qing dynasty royal gardens that dates back to the early 18th century.

Constructed during the reign of the Kangxi Emperor (r. 1661–1722) in the Qing dynasty, it was originally named "Xichun Garden" (熙春园; 熙春園; Xīchūn Yuán). Later, it was divided into two gardens: Chunze Garden (春泽园; 春澤園; Chūnzé Yuán) and Hande Garden (涵德园; 涵德園; Hándé Yuán). Chunze Garden and Hande Garden were later respectively renamed to "Jinchun Garden" (近春园; 近春園; Jìnchūn Yuán) and "Xichun Garden" (its former name). In 1852, during the reign of the Xianfeng Emperor, the garden was renamed again to "Qinghua Garden" (or "Tsinghua Garden").

In the present-day, "Tsinghua Garden" generally refers to the locations of the Tsinghua University, such as the Tsinghua Garden, the former Jinchun Garden, and other Qing dynasty gardens in the university.

== Name ==
The name of the garden, "Tsinghua" (Qinghua), which gave its name to the university later on, derived from a line in a poem from the 5th-century poet Xie Hun (謝混) called You Xi Chi (游西池).

== History ==
Tsinghua Garden, originally the Xichun Garden, was granted as a gift by the Kangxi Emperor to his third son, Yinzhi (Prince Cheng). It was part of the Old Summer Palace and was called the "East Garden" (東園) because it was located to the east of the Old Summer Palace. The Kangxi Emperor visited the garden ten times when the garden was owned by Yinzhi, and celebrated eight of his birthdays at the garden, including his 60th birthday in 1713. He also wrote calligraphy for five plaques displayed all over the garden, one of which was the garden's name (Xichun Garden).

In 1821, the Daoguang Emperor divided the Xichun Garden into Chunze Garden (later renamed to Jinchun Garden) and Hande Garden (later renamed back to Xichun Garden), and granted them respectively to his brothers Mianxin (Prince Ruihuai 瑞懷親王) and Miankai (Prince Dunke 惇恪親王). After Miankai's death, Xichun Garden was inherited by his adopted son, Yicong (Prince Dun). As Yicong was actually the fifth son of the Daoguang Emperor, Xichun Garden was loosely referred to as the "Fifth Prince's Garden" (小五爺園).

In 1852, after the Xianfeng Emperor came to the throne, he renamed Xichun Garden to "Qinghua Garden" (or "Tsinghua Garden"). In 1860, during the Second Opium War, the Anglo-French forces destroyed Jinchun Garden while burning down the Old Summer Palace. Qinghua Garden sustained little or no damage. After Yicong's death, Qinghua Garden was inherited by his eldest son, Zailian.

In the aftermath of the 1900 Boxer Rebellion, Qinghua Garden was confiscated by the Qing imperial government because it had been used by Zailian's younger brother, Zaiyi (Prince Duan), as a meeting location with the Boxer rebels. The garden fell into disrepair for some years before the imperial government approved a request by the foreign affairs ministry to build a school on the land. The school, named "Qinghua School" (or "Tsinghua School") (清華學堂), started operating in 1911.

In 1913, the Qinghua School formally acquired the former Jinchun Garden and the surrounding areas, and gradually expanded over time to become the present-day Tsinghua University.
