= Yizhi (prince) =

- Prince Rui of the Second Rank 多羅瑞郡王

Prince Rui of the Second Rank
- Tenure: 27 September 1828 – 27 June 1850
- Predecessor: Mianxin
- Successor: Zaiyi
- Born: 30 October 1827
- Died: 27 June 1850 (aged 22)
Posthumous name
- Prince Ruimin of the Second Rank (瑞敏郡王)
- Father: Mianxin

Yizhi (奕誌, 30 October 1827 - 27 June 1850) was a Qing dynasty imperial prince and the first son of Mianxin, Jiaqing Emperor's fourth son. Yizhi did not have a male heir to inherit his title, so the peerage was de facto extinct. There were two posthumous adoptions done so as to continue the lineage. The peerage was finally abolished in 1900 due to the brutal involvement of Zaiyi in the Boxer Rebellion.

== Life ==
Yizhi was born to secondary princess consort Ruihuai, lady Xu, as Yiyue (奕约). In 1828, when he became an orphan, several princes, including Prince Ding of the First Rank Yishao, were appointed as curators until he would reach the maturity age. At that time, the second character in his personal name was changed to "zhi" with Kangxi radical "speech" (誌) so as to share resemblance with the characters in the personal names of sons of the Daoguang Emperor.

Yizhi was described by elder servants as beautiful and shy person who was rarely seen in aristocratic circles. Moreover, the acquaintances mentioned that his mental abilities were rather limited.

In 1848, Yizhi made sacrifices at the Chang mausoleum of the Western Qing tombs. Yizhi died on 27 June 1850, having been barely 22 years old and was posthumously honoured as Prince Ruimin of the Second Rank (多罗瑞敏郡王, meaning "propitious and clever"). The funeral was organised by Yixin, Prince Gong.

=== Adoption ===
Yizhi had only one son who died prematurely. As his daughters either married off or died prematurely, there were two imperial princes adopted as his sons. In 1861, Zaiyi, a son of Yicong, Prince Dun of the First Rank was adopted posthumously as Yizhi's son. In 1894, the title Zaiyi succeeded was renamed to "Prince Duan of the Second Rank". After Zaiyi was stripped of his title for his ferocious actions towards foreigners during Boxer Rebellion, Zaixun, a son of Yixuan, Prince Chun of the First Rank, was adopted as another successor of Yizhi. Zaixun was granted a status of prince of the second rank because of the decree proclaiming expiry of Yizhi's title.

== Family ==
Yizhi was married to lady Feimo, a daughter of fourth rank literary official Wenwei (文蔚) since 1840. His primary consort was 15 years old at that time. Lady Feimo died in the same day as lady Zhang, Yizhi's mistress.

Consorts and issue:

- Primary consort, of the Feimo clan (嫡福晋费莫氏, 1825 - 8 March 1877）
  - First son (1845)
  - Third daughter
  - Zairong, Princess of the Fourth Rank (县主载容)
    - Married Xixian (希贤) in 1869
- Mistress, of the Zhang clan (庶福晋张氏, d. 8 March 1877)
  - First daughter (June 1847-September 1847)
  - Second daughter
    - Married Liankui (联奎) of the Bolod clan in 1863
  - Lady of the Second Rank
    - Her marriage was organised in 1868
  - Seventh daughter
    - Married Narsu (那尔苏) of the Khorchin Borjigin clan in 1872
