= Huang Shixiang =

Chinese Beijing opera singer (born 1934)

- Traditional Chinese: 黃世驤
- Simplified Chinese: 黄世骧
Transcriptions
Standard Mandarin
- Hanyu Pinyin: Huáng Shìxiāng
- Wade–Giles: Huang Shih-hsiang

Huang Shixiang (born 1934) is a Chinese Beijing opera singer best known for his performances in "Jade River" Taijun Cichao (太君辭朝) and Hongzong Liema (紅鬃烈馬). His father, Pugong, was the son of Zaixun, a Manchu prince of the late Qing dynasty. Had the empire not been abolished, he would be fourth in line to the throne if eligible as of 2024, behind Jin Yuzhang and his brothers.

Huang has gone to some lengths to conceal his imperial ancestry. Rather than his father's family name Aisin Gioro or its Chinese form Jin, he goes by the maiden name of his mother Huang Yongni (stage name Xue Yanqin), who was also a famous Beijing opera actress. He is likewise registered as a member of his mother's Hui Chinese ethnic group rather than as a Manchu.
