= Pujun =

Imperial Prince (1886)

- Burubafen fuguo gong
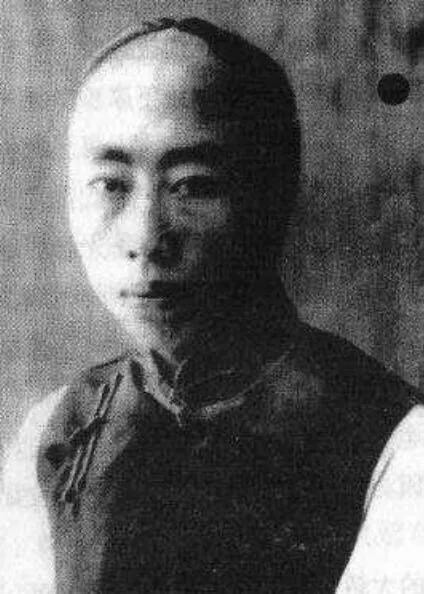

First Prince
- Tenure: 24 January–25 September 1900
- Monarch: Guangxu Emperor
- Born: 5 January 1886; Beijing
- Died: 1942 (aged 55–56); Beijing
- Spouse: Lady Borjigit (daughter of Dorotseleng, Prince Alxa)
- Issue: 2
Names
- Pujun (溥儁)
- House: Aisin-Gioro
- Dynasty: Qing
- Father: Zaiyi
- Mother: Lady Borjigit (daughter of Günsenjürmed, Prince Alxa)

Pujun (Chinese: 溥儁; pinyin: Pǔjùn, 5 January 1886–1942) was a Qing dynasty imperial prince of the Aisin-Gioro clan. He was the second son of Zaiyi, Prince Duan.

After the health of the Guangxu Emperor began to decline, Pujun was among the three princes considered to become heir presumptive by regent Empress Dowager Cixi. Pujun was ultimately chosen by the empress dowager and was titled the "First Prince" (大阿哥) in January 1900.

After Prince Duan fell out of favor with the empress dowager in 1900 due to the Boxer Rebellion, Pujun was stripped of his princely title. He later gained a political position after the Xinhai Revolution in 1911 as an advisor to the president, but lost the position during subsequent political upheaval. He spent the rest of his life in poverty, until his death in 1942.

== Life ==
Pujun's father, Prince Duan, sided with the Empress Dowager Cixi and opposed the Hundred Days' Reform movement initiated by the Guangxu Emperor and his allies. On 22 September 1898, Cixi launched a coup d'état and put Guangxu under house arrest in the Summer Palace. Shortly after the coup, Guangxu's health began to decline, prompting Cixi to name an heir presumptive. Three princes were considered as potential candidates: Pujun, the second son of Prince Duan; Zaizhen, the eldest son of Prince Qing; and Puwei, the eldest son of Prince Gong. Finally, Cixi chose Pujun as the heir presumptive.

On 24 January 1900, Pujun was titled the "First Prince" (大阿哥) and officially recognized as an adoptive son of the deceased Tongzhi Emperor: thereby, he would have the legitimacy to inherit the throne. There were rumors that Cixi planned to depose the Guangxu Emperor and replace him with Pujun.

On the same day, Cixi issued a decree to the cabinet that Pujun would offer sacrifices to heaven and ancestors on behalf of the emperor in the next Lunar New Year (31 January 1900). However, this decision was not popular with Chinese bureaucrats. On 27 January 1900, Jing Yuanshan (經元善), the director-general of the Shanghai Telegraph Administration, sent a telegram asking Guangxu to "handle court affairs though you are ill, don't think about abdicating the throne." (力疾臨御, 勿存退位之思). The co-signers were Ye Han, Ma Yuzao, Zhang Binglin, Wang Yinian, Ding Huikang, and Shen Xin.

At the same time, 1,231 celebrities, including Tang Caichang, Jing Hengyi, Cai Yuanpei and Huang Yanpei, published an announcement to all provinces, asking them to jointly fight, "If the court ignores it, we will ask all the industrial and commercial merchants to go on strike to discuss the matter." (如朝廷不理, 則請我諸工商通行罷市集議). Later, the ministers of foreign countries also did not recognise Pujun's legitimacy, except for the Russian minister. Finally, Cixi was forced to abandon the plan.

Prince Duan, the biological father of Pujun, fell out of favor with the Empress Dowager after the Boxer rebels were defeated by the Eight-Nation Alliance. Pujun was stripped of his princely title, forced to leave the Forbidden City, and lived in the Prince Dun's Mansion (惇親王府). He changed his life completely, smoking opium and living a life of debauchery.

After the Xinhai Revolution, Pujun served as an advisor to the president until 1921. Pujun lost his official position in a political upheaval, his annual income stopped, and his fortune was deplete. He spent his last years living with the help of his brother-in-law, Tawangbulagjal, Prince Alxa.

Pujun died in poverty in 1942. His family had no money to bury him, so they had to temporarily place his coffin in Jiaxing Temple (嘉興寺). His body was buried on the spot after the founding of the People's Republic of China.
