= Hushenying =

- Active: 1899–1900
- Country: China
- Allegiance: Qing dynasty
- Branch: Eight Banners
- Type: Corps
- Size: 10,000
- Garrison/HQ: Peking
- Engagements: Boxer Rebellion

Commanders
- Ceremonial chief: Zaiyi
- Notable commanders: Zaiyi

The Hushenying (traditional Chinese: 虎神營; simplified Chinese: 虎神营; pinyin: Hǔshényíng) were a unit of 10,000 Manchu Bannermen under the command of Zaiyi during the Boxer Rebellion. Zaiyi himself created the unit in 1899, but it was decimated at the Battle of Peking in 1900 when the Eight-Nation Alliance captured Beijing to lift the Chinese siege of the foreign legations during the Boxer Uprising.

== Summary ==
Hushenying has been translated variously as Tiger Spirit Division, Tiger and Divine Corps, and Tiger Spirit Battalion.

Zaiyi, also known as Prince Duan, created the Hushenying in June 1899, for which he gained the praise of Empress Dowager Cixi. The new division contained 10,000 troops, all recruited from the banner armies that garrisoned the capital. Some Chinese sources claim that Zaiyi chose the name Hushenying to convey his dislike of foreigners – since "tiger eats lamb (Yang, a pun on foreigners), and the divine tames the devil (Gui)" – but this claim cannot be verified in the documents of the time. The Hushenying became the third modern army guarding Beijing, the other two being the Guards Army (established shortly before the Hushenying in 1899) and the older Peking Field Force (created in 1862).

During the Boxer Uprising (1899–1901), the Hushenying was among the troops that besieged the Beijing Legation Quarter, where most foreigners lived. During that siege (summer 1900), the Hushenying led by the harshly anti-foreign Zaiyi often clashed with the Peking Field Force, which was commanded by the more moderate Yikuang (Prince Qing). Both armies were decimated in the Battle of Peking.

Several Chinese works of fiction have been written about the Hushenying.

== See also ==
- Peking Field Force
- Shenjiying

== Works cited ==
- Chinese Literature: Fiction, Poetry, Art. Foreign Languages Press. Spring 1985.
- Deng, Youmei (1986). Snuff-Bottles and Other Stories. Panda Books. Translated by Gladys Yang. Beijing: Chinese Literature. ISBN 0-8351-1607-7.
- Rhoads, Edward J. M. (2001). Manchus & Han: Ethnic Relations and Political Power in Late Qing and Early Republican China, 1861–1928. Seattle and London: University of Washington Press. ISBN 0-295-98040-0.
- Xiang, Lanxin [相藍欣] (2003). The Origins of the Boxer War: A Multinational Study. Psychology Press. ISBN 0-7007-1563-0.
