= Prince Rui (created 1819) =

Prince Rui of the First Rank
- Traditional Chinese: 和碩瑞親王
- Simplified Chinese: 和硕瑞亲王
Transcriptions
Standard Mandarin
- Hanyu Pinyin: héshuò ruì qīnwáng
- Wade–Giles: ho-shuo jui ch'in-wang

Prince Duan of the Second Rank
- Traditional Chinese: 多羅端郡王
- Simplified Chinese: 多罗端郡王
Transcriptions
Standard Mandarin
- Hanyu Pinyin: duōluó duān jùnwáng
- Wade–Giles: to-lo tuan chün-wang

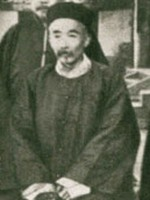
Zaiyi (1856–1922), the third in the Prince Rui line

Prince Rui of the First Rank (Manchu: ᡥᠣᡧᠣᡳ
ᠰᠠᠪᡳᠩᡤᠠ
ᠴᡳᠨ ᠸᠠᠩ; hošoi sabingga cin wang), or simply Prince Rui, was the title of a princely peerage used in China during the Manchu-led Qing dynasty (1644–1912). As the Prince Rui peerage was not awarded "iron-cap" status, this meant that each successive bearer of the title would normally start off with a title downgraded by one rank vis-à-vis that held by his predecessor. However, the title would generally not be downgraded to any lower than a feng'en fuguo gong except under special circumstances.

The first bearer of the title was Mianxin (綿忻; 1805–1828), the Jiaqing Emperor's fourth son, who was made "Prince Rui of the First Rank" in 1819. It was briefly renamed to Prince Duan of the Second Rank (Prince Duan) between 1894 and 1900 when Zaiyi inherited the title. The title was passed down over three generations and held by four persons.

== Members of the Prince Rui peerage ==
Members of the Prince Rui peerage
- Mianxin (綿忻; 1805–1828), the Jiaqing Emperor's fourth son, held the title Prince Rui of the First Rank from 1819 to 1828, posthumously honoured as Prince Ruihuai of the First Rank (瑞懷親王)
  - Yizhi (奕誌; 1827–1850), Mianxin's eldest son, held the title Prince Rui of the Second Rank from 1828 to 1850, posthumously honoured as Prince Ruimin of the Second Rank (瑞敏郡王)
    - Zaiyi (1856–1922), Yicong's second son and Yizhi's adopted son, held the title of a beile from 1861 to 1894, made an acting junwang in 1889, succeeded Yizhi under the title "Prince Duan of the Second Rank" in 1894, stripped of his title in 1900
    - Zaixun (1885–1949), Yixuan's sixth son and Yizhi's adopted son, initially a buru bafen fuguo gong from 1887 to 1889, promoted to feng'en fuguo gong in 1889 and feng'en zhenguo gong in 1890, made a beile in 1902 and an acting junwang in 1908

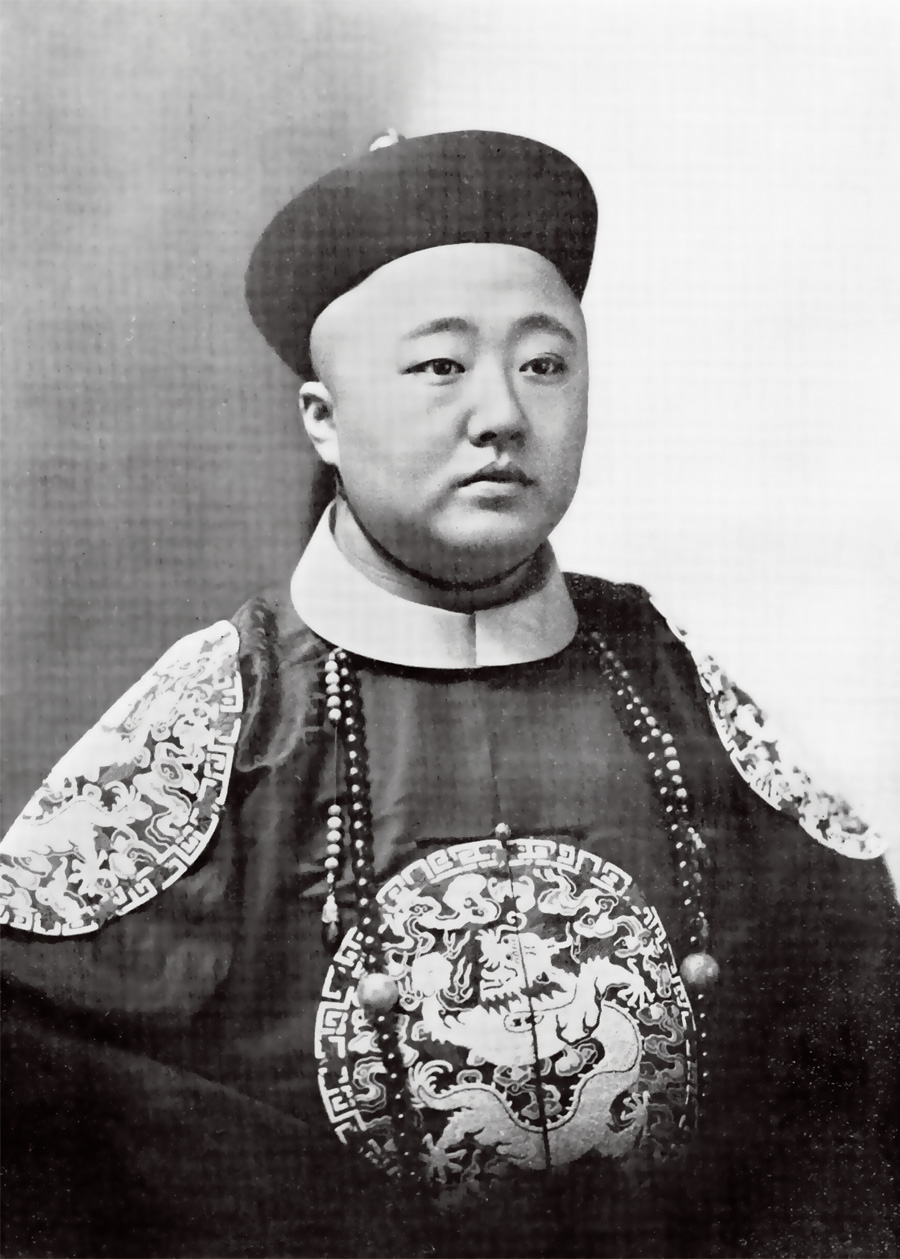
Zaixun (1885–1949), the fourth in the Prince Rui line

== Family tree ==
Family tree

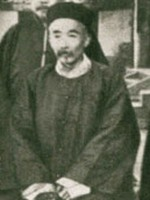
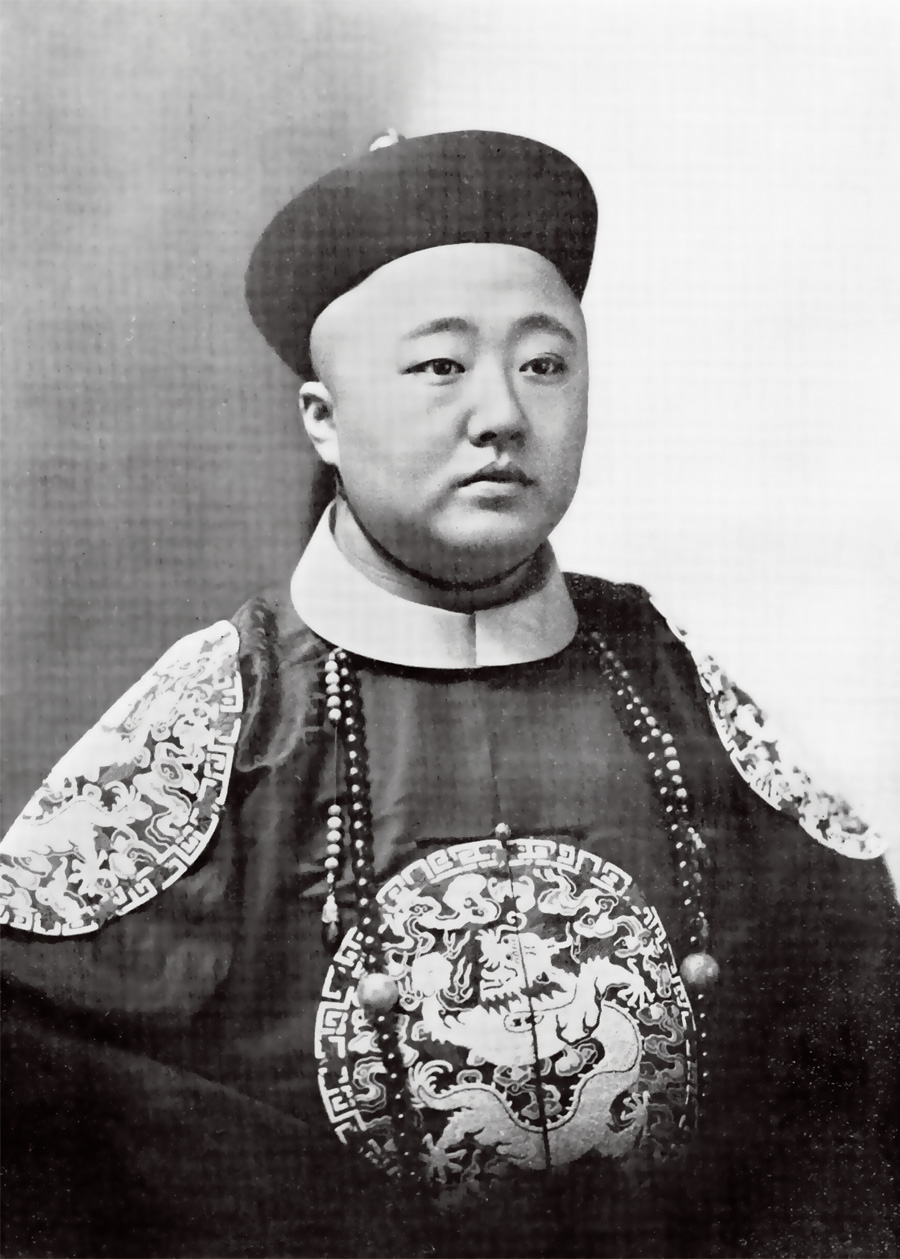
Jiaqing Emperor
2	4
Daoguang Emperor	Mianxin 綿忻 ^{1} 1805 – 1828; Prince Ruihuai of the First Rank 瑞懷親王; 1819 – 1828
5	7	1
Yicong 奕誴; Prince Dunqin of the First Rank 惇勤親王	Yixuan 奕譞; Prince Chunxian of the First Rank 醇賢親王	Yizhi 奕誌 ^{2} 1827 – 1850; Prince Ruimin of the Second Rank 瑞敏郡王; 1828 – 1850
2	6
Zaiyi 載漪 ^{3} 1856 – 1922 Prince Duan of the Second Rank 端郡王; 1894 – 1900	Zaixun 載洵 ^{4} 1885 – 1949 Beile acting Junwang 郡王銜貝勒; 1908 – 1949
1	2
Puzhuan 溥僎; 1875 – 1920; First Class Defender General 一等鎮國將軍; 1894 – 1920	Pujun 溥儁; 1885 – 1942; Lesser Bulwark Duke 不入八分輔國公; 1901 – 1942	Pugong 溥侊; 1904 – c. 1960s

Legend:
- - Title bearers
- - Emperors

adoption

== See also ==
- Royal and noble ranks of the Qing dynasty
