= Pugong =

- Born: 19 March 1904; Shuntian Prefecture, Zhili, Qing dynasty
- Died: c. 1960s Beijing, China
- Consort: Lady Chahala (div. 1934) Xue Yanqin
- Issue: Huang Shixiang
Names
- Aisin Gioro Pugong (愛新覺羅 溥侊); Pujian (溥健); Ali (阿里)
- House: Aisin Gioro
- Father: Zaixun
- Mother: Lady Biru
- Religion: Islam

Pugong
- Chinese: 溥侊
Transcriptions
Standard Mandarin
- Hanyu Pinyin: Pǔgōng
- Wade–Giles: P'u^{3}-kung^{1}

Pujian (birth name)
- Chinese: 溥健
Transcriptions
Standard Mandarin
- Hanyu Pinyin: Pǔjiàn

Ali (islamic name)
- Chinese: 阿里
Transcriptions
Standard Mandarin
- Hanyu Pinyin: Ālǐ

Pugong (19 March 1904 – c. 1960s), born as Pujian, also referred to as P'u Kuang and Ali, was a Manchu prince of the Qing dynasty. He was the son of Zaixun and a cousin of Puyi, the Last Emperor of China, and a great-grandson of the Daoguang Emperor.

His first marriage was to Lady Chahala, daughter of Vice Minister Zeng Chong. The marriage ended in divorce in 1934 without issue.

He married a second time to Huang Yongni (黃詠霓), an ethnic Hui Beijing opera actress who is better known by her stage name Xue Yanqin (雪艷琴). Soon after the marriage, he converted to Islam, renounced his royal status and took the Islamic name Ali. The marriage produced one son and three daughters. Pugong was devout in his new faith, strictly abided to Islamic precepts, and often went to the Xidan Mosque to participate in prayer. He was present at the opening of the Tokyo Mosque in 1938.

His son, Huang Shixiang, who adopted his mother's family name "Huang", is also a prominent Beijing opera actor.

== Family ==
- First wife, of the Chahala clan (察哈拉氏; div. 1934), personal name unknown
- Second wife, of the Huang clan (黃氏), personal name Yongni (詠霓), stage name Xue Yanqin (雪艷琴)
  - Huang Shixiang (黃世驤; b. January 1941), first son
  - First daughter
  - Second daughter
  - Third daughter
