= Zaixun, Prince Rui =

Qing Dynasty prince (1885–1949)

Zaixun
- Junwang-ranked beile 郡王銜貝勒
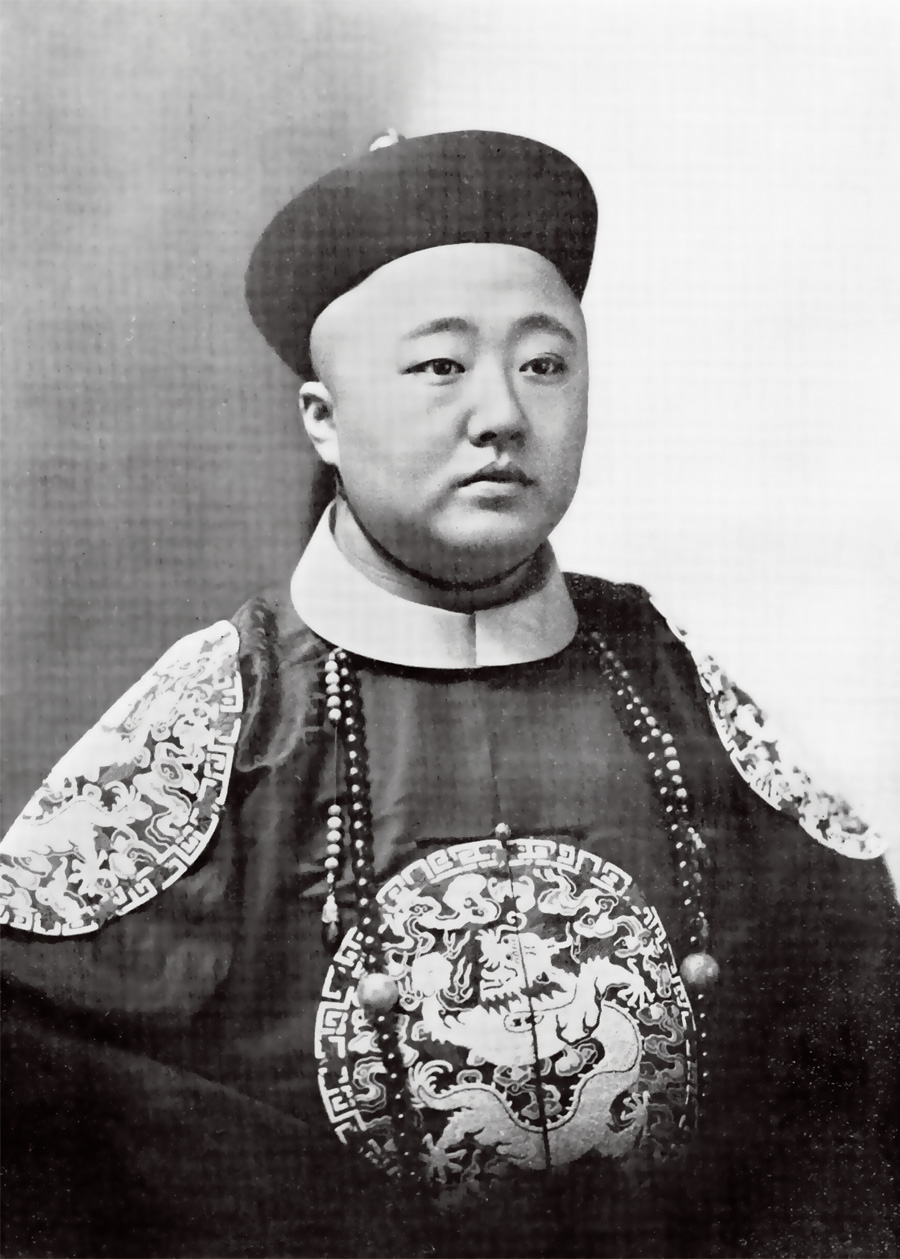
- Zaixun in the early 1900s

Head of the House of Prince Rui peerage
- Tenure: 1902–1945
- Predecessor: Zaiyi
- Successor: peerage abolished

Minister of Navy
- In office: 4 December 1909 – 16 November 1911
- Predecessor: position created
- Successor: Sa Zhenbing
- Prime Minister: Yikuang, Prince Qing
- Born: 20 May 1885; Beijing, China
- Died: 30 March 1949 (aged 63); Tianjin, China
- Consorts: Lady Biru
- Issue: Pugong
Names
- Aisin Gioro Zaixun (愛新覺羅 載洵)
- House: Aisin Gioro
- Father: Yixuan, Prince Chunxian of the First Rank
- Mother: Cuiyan
- Military career
- Allegiance: Qing Dynasty
- Branch: Imperial Chinese Navy

Zaixun
- Traditional Chinese: 載洵
- Simplified Chinese: 载洵
Transcriptions
Standard Mandarin
- Hanyu Pinyin: Zàixún

Zhongquan (courtesy name)
- Chinese: 仲泉
Transcriptions
Standard Mandarin
- Hanyu Pinyin: Zhòngquán

Chiyun (art name)
- Traditional Chinese: 癡雲
- Simplified Chinese: 痴云
Transcriptions
Standard Mandarin
- Hanyu Pinyin: Chīyún

Zaixun (20 May 1885 – 30 March 1949), courtesy name Zhongquan, art name Chiyun, also known as Tsai Hsun in early references, was a Manchu noble of the late Qing dynasty. He also served as a Navy Minister in the Imperial Cabinet of Prince Qing. He was the sixth son of Prince Chun, a paternal uncle of the Xuantong Emperor, a half first cousin of the Tongzhi Emperor, and a paternal half-brother of the Guangxu Emperor.

== Life ==
Zaixun was adopted into the lineage of his relative, Yizhi (奕誌; 1827–1850), because Yizhi had no son to succeed him. In 1887, he was made a buru bafen fuguo gong, and was subsequently promoted to feng'en fuguo gong in 1889 and feng'en zhenguo gong in 1890. In 1900, Zaixun's predecessor, Zaiyi, who succeeded Yizhi as "Prince Rui of the Second Rank" (later renamed to "Prince Duan of the Second Rank"), was stripped of his title of nobility and exiled to Xinjiang for his role in the Boxer Rebellion. Two years later, Zaixun succeeded Zaiyi as a beile of the Prince Rui peerage. In 1908, he was made an acting junwang (Prince of the Second Rank) but remained nominally a beile.

In 1909, Zaixun was appointed as an acting Navy Minister (海軍大臣) in the Imperial Cabinet headed by Prince Qing. Later, he was sent to Europe and the United States to study the navies of the Western powers. After returning to China, in 1911, he became a full Navy Minister. After the Xinhai Revolution overthrew the Qing dynasty, he lived the rest of his life in retirement in Beijing and Tianjin. He died in Tianjin in 1949.

== Family ==
- Wife, of the Biru clan (必祿氏)
  - Pugong (溥侊; b. 19 March 1904), first son
  - First daughter (b. 28 January 1905)
  - Second daughter (b. 2 February 1906)
  - Third daughter (b. 3 February 1907)
    - Married Bai Fengming (白鳳鳴; 1909–1980)

== Ancestry ==
Qianlong Emperor (1711–1799)
Jiaqing Emperor (1760–1820)
Empress Xiaoyichun (1727–1775)
Daoguang Emperor (1782–1850)
He'erjing'e
Empress Xiaoshurui (1760–1797)
Lady Wanggiya
Yixuan (1840–1891)
Bailu
Lingshou (1788–1824)
Imperial Noble Consort Zhuangshun (1822–1866)
Lady Weng
Zaixun (1885–1949)
Deqing
Cuiyan (1866–1925)

== See also ==
- Prince Rui (瑞)
- Royal and noble ranks of the Qing dynasty#Male members

Military offices
Preceded by Position established	Minister of Navy of the Great Qing; 1909–1911	Succeeded by Sa Zhenbing
