= Zaiyi =

Manchu prince and statesman of the late Qing dynasty

- Prince Duan of the Second Rank 多羅端郡王
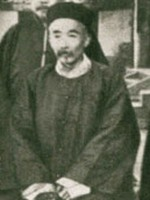
- Zaiyi c. 1890s

Prince Duan of the Second Rank
- Tenure: 13 February 1894 – 25 September 1900
- Successor: Zaixun

Grand Councilor
- Tenure: 10 June 1900 – 25 September 1900
- Monarch: Guangxu Emperor
- Born: 26 August 1856
- Died: 10 January 1923 (aged 66)
- Spouse: Yehenara Jingfang
- Issue: Puzhuan; Pujun
Names
- Aisin Gioro Zaiyi (愛新覺羅 載漪); Manchu: Dzai-i (ᡯᠠᡳᡳ)
- House: Aisin Gioro
- Dynasty: Qing
- Father: Yicong
- Military career
- Allegiance: Qing Dynasty
- Conflicts: Boxer Rebellion

Zaiyi
- Traditional Chinese: 載漪
- Simplified Chinese: 载漪
Transcriptions
Standard Mandarin
- Hanyu Pinyin: Zǎiyī
- Wade–Giles: Tsai-i

Prince Duan (of the Second Rank)
- Chinese: 端郡王
Transcriptions
Standard Mandarin
- Hanyu Pinyin: Duān Jùnwáng
- Wade–Giles: Tuan Chün-wang

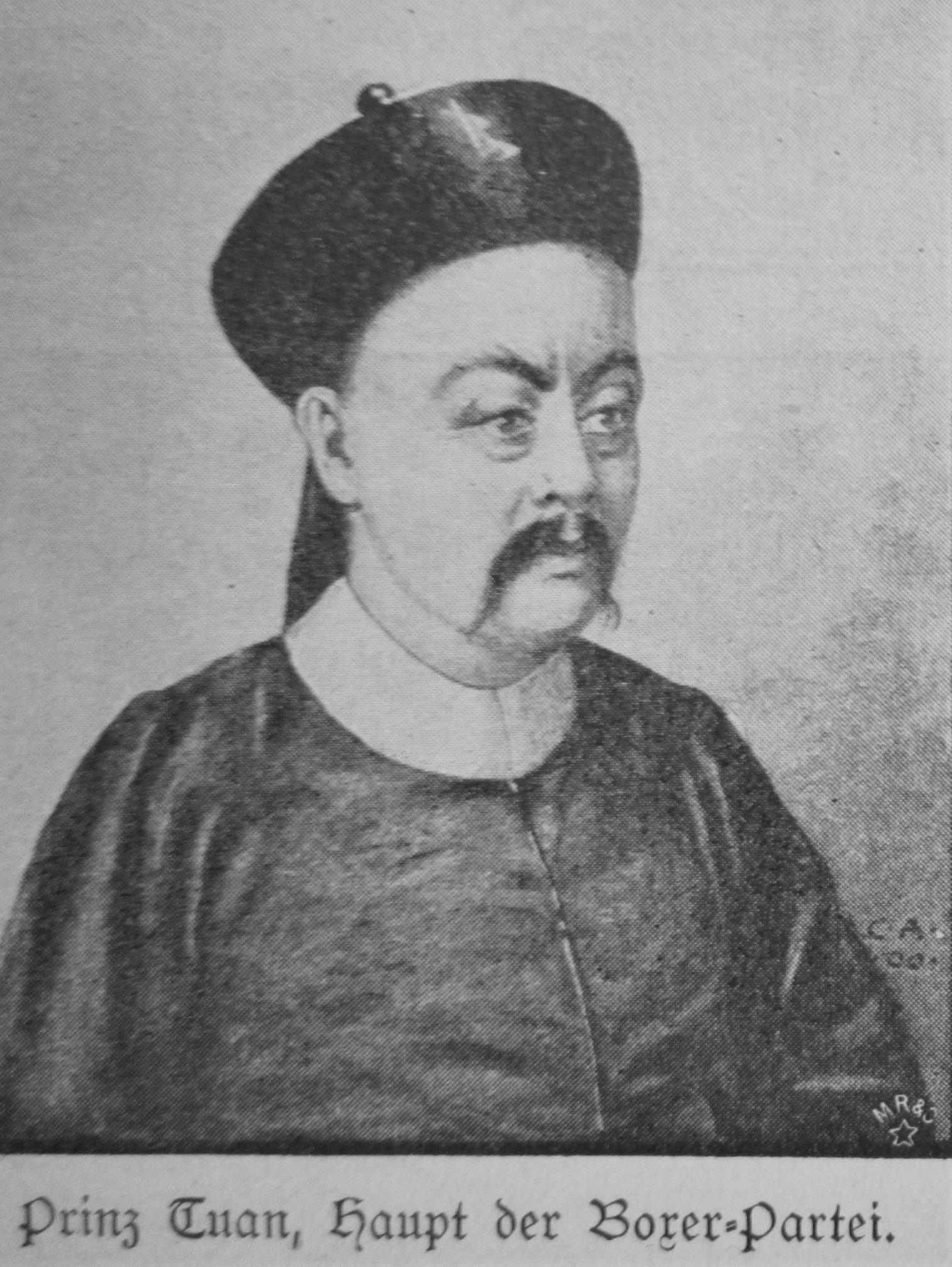
Prinz Zaiyi Tuan, Führer der Boxerpartei in China

Zaiyi (Chinese: 載漪; pinyin: Zǎiyī; Manchu: ᡯᠠᡳᡳ; dzai-i; 26 August 1856 – 10 January 1923), better known by his title Prince Duan (or Prince Tuan, 端郡王), was a Manchu prince and statesman of the late Qing dynasty. He is best known as one of the leaders of the Boxer Rebellion of 1899–1901.

== Early life and career ==
Zaiyi was born in the Aisin Gioro clan as the second son of Yicong (Prince Dun), the fifth son of the Daoguang Emperor. His family was under the Bordered White Banner of the Eight Banners. He was adopted by his father's cousin, Yizhi (奕誌; 1827–1850), who had no son to inherit his Prince Rui peerage. In 1861, Zaiyi was made a beile, before succeeding Yizhi as a junwang (second-rank prince) under the title "Prince Duan of the Second Rank" (端郡王) in 1894.

Prince Duan sided with Empress Dowager Cixi and opposed the Hundred Days' Reform movement initiated by the Guangxu Emperor and his allies. After the reformist movement was crushed, in 1899, Empress Dowager Cixi designated Prince Duan's son, Pujun as First Prince (大阿哥) in her plan to depose the Guangxu Emperor and replace him with Puzhuan. However, since the ambassadors of other countries did not recognise Puzhuan's legitimacy, the empress dowager was forced to abandon her plan.

== Role in the Boxer Rebellion ==
A leading conservative and strongly anti-foreign politician, Prince Duan was one of the main supporters of the Righteous Harmony Society (義和團; "Boxers") during the Boxer Rebellion of 1899–1901. He arranged a meeting between Empress Dowager Cixi and Boxer leader Cao Futian. In 1899, Prince Duan set up his own private armed forces, the Tiger and Divine Corps, which was among the several modernised Manchu banner forces. During the crisis in June 1900, he headed the Zongli Yamen (foreign affairs ministry) and commanded the Boxers who besieged the Beitang cathedral. He was also in command of the Beijing Field Force against the forces of the Eight-Nation Alliance. Prince Duan's younger brother, Zailan (載瀾), was also one of the leaders of the Boxer Rebellion.

Prince Duan fell out of favour with the imperials after the Boxers were defeated, and the Qing government was forced to side with the Eight-Nation Alliance against the Boxers. The victorious Eight-Nation Alliance named Prince Duan as one of the masterminds behind the rebellion. In 1902, the Qing government issued an imperial decree condemning Prince Duan for his involvement in the Boxer Rebellion. Prince Duan and his family were exiled to Xinjiang. According to Empress Dowager Cixi's lady-in-waiting Yu Deling, the empress dowager blamed Prince Duan for the Boxer crisis and for issuing an imperial decree ordering the killing of all foreigners without her authorisation and knowledge.

Rumours circulated during the Boxer rebellion about Dong Fuxiang and Prince Duan seizing control of Gansu and rebelling, which were false. Another rumour reported that Dong Fuxiang retired.

== Life in exile and brief return to Beijing ==
Prince Duan did not end up in Xinjiang during his exile. Instead, he went to Alashan, west of Ningxia, and lived in the residence of a Mongol prince. Around 1911, he moved to Ningxia during the Xinhai Revolution when the Muslims took control of Ningxia. After that, he moved to Xinjiang with Sheng Yun.

Prince Duan lived in exile until 1917, when the general Zhang Xun briefly restored Puyi, the Last Emperor who abdicated in 1912, to the Qing imperial throne. He was regarded as a national hero by the ruling elite because of his aggressive anti-foreign stance. The Beiyang government of the Republic of China invited him back to Beijing and cooperated with him. Prince Duan's hatred for things regarded as foreign to China, however, never changed. He refused to eat when a military officer threw a party for him in Western style. He also became angry when he heard about his grandchildren riding in trains because he believed that trains were objects alien to China. Foreigners were furious when they learnt that Prince Duan had returned to Beijing, and started protesting to the Beiyang government. As a result, Prince Duan moved back to Ningxia and lived the rest of his life there. The Beiyang government increased his stipend by 50%. He died in 1923.

== Martial arts ==
Prince Duan left his name in the history of Chinese martial arts. Yang Luchan, the founder of Yang-style taijiquan, and other famous martial artists were patronized by Prince Duan. It was in the prince's residence that copies were made of a seminal classic forty chapter text of taijiquan principles for Luchan's son Yang Banhou as well as Wu Quanyou, the first teacher of Wu-style taijiquan.

== Family ==
Prince Duan was a cousin of the Guangxu Emperor because the emperor's biological father, Prince Chun, was the seventh brother of Prince Dun, Prince Duan's biological father. Prince Duan also had an additional layer of familial ties with the Guangxu Emperor: His wife, Jingfang of the Yehenara clan, was the third daughter of Guixiang (桂祥), Empress Dowager Cixi's younger brother. Guixiang's second daughter, Jingfen, was the Empress Consort of the Guangxu Emperor.

However, the Genealogy of the Aisin Gioro Family (愛新覺羅宗譜) does not confirm that Prince Duan's wife was Jingfang, Empress Dowager Cixi's niece. Prince Duan's primary spouse was the daughter of Shaochang (紹昌) from the Irgen Gioro clan (伊爾根覺羅氏). She bore Prince Duan's eldest son, Puzhuan (溥僎). Prince Duan's secondary spouse was the daughter of Gongsangzhu'ermote (貢桑朱爾默特), a jasagh-prince from the Mongol Borjigin clan. She gave birth to Pujun (溥儁), Prince Duan's second son.

== Portrayals in media ==
Prince Duan is portrayed by Australian actor Robert Helpmann in the 1963 American historical film 55 Days at Peking.

== Literature ==
- Portrait of Prince Tuan, leader of the Boxer-Party in China, in: Deutscher Hausschatz, XXVI, 1899/1900, No. 46, p. 861-864 (Portrait: p. 862).

== See also ==
- Prince Rui (瑞)
- Prince Dun
- Royal and noble ranks of the Qing dynasty § Male members
- Ranks of imperial consorts in China § Qing
- List of 1900–1930 publications on the Boxer Rebellion
- Imperial Decree on events leading to the signing of Boxer Protocol
