= Yicong =

Qing Dynasty prince (1831–1889)

- Prince Dun of the First Rank 和碩惇親王

Prince Dun of the First Rank
- Tenure: November 1846 – 18 February 1889
- Predecessor: Miankai
- Successor: Zailian
- Born: 23 July 1831; Beijing, China
- Died: 18 February 1889 (aged 57); Beijing, China
- Consorts: Lady Ulanghaigimot
- Issue: Zailian; Zaiyi, Prince Duan of the Second Rank; Zailan; Zaiying; Zaijin
Names
- Aisin Gioro Yicong (愛新覺羅 奕誴)
Posthumous name
- Prince Dunqin of the First Rank (惇勤親王)
- House: Aisin Gioro
- Father: Daoguang Emperor
- Mother: Consort Xiang

Yicong
- Chinese: 奕誴
Transcriptions
Standard Mandarin
- Hanyu Pinyin: Yìcóng
- Wade–Giles: I-ts'ung

Prince Dun
- Traditional Chinese: 惇親王
- Simplified Chinese: 惇亲王
Transcriptions
Standard Mandarin
- Hanyu Pinyin: Dūn Qīnwáng
- Wade–Giles: Tun Chin-wang

Yicong (23 July 1831 – 18 February 1889), formally known as Prince Dun (or Prince Tun), was a Manchu prince of the Qing dynasty.

== Life ==
Yicong was born in the Aisin Gioro clan as the fifth son of the Daoguang Emperor. His mother was Consort Xiang from the Niohuru clan. He was adopted by his uncle Miankai (綿愷), the third son of the Jiaqing Emperor, because Miankai had no surviving sons to succeed him. Upon Miankai's death in 1838, Yicong inherited his adoptive father's peerage and became known as "Prince Dun of the First Rank" (惇親王).

Following the death of the Daoguang Emperor in 1850, Yicong's fourth brother Yizhu succeeded their father and became historically known as the Xianfeng Emperor. When the Xianfeng Emperor died in 1861, Yicong and his seventh brother, Yixuan (Prince Chun), were both in Rehe Province with the emperor, while their sixth brother, Yixin (Prince Gong), was in the imperial capital, Beijing. Yicong supported Yixin in the Xinyou Coup of 1861 and helped him seize power from a group of eight regents appointed by the Xianfeng Emperor on his deathbed to assist his son, the Tongzhi Emperor. In 1865, Yicong was appointed as the head of the Imperial Clan Court.

Yicong died in 1889 during the reign of the Guangxu Emperor. His great-grandson, Yuyan, was a self-proclaimed successor to Puyi, the last emperor of the Qing dynasty. Yicong's former residence is at Qinghua Gardens (清華園), the present-day location of Tsinghua (Qinghua) University.

== Family ==
Primary Consort

- Primary consort, of the Ulanghaigimot clan (嫡福晉 烏梁海濟爾默特氏)
  - First daughter (29 February 1852 – 24 December 1857)
  - Fourth daughter (21 March 1855 – 28 November 1855)
  - Sixth daughter (8 October 1858)

Secondary Consort

- Secondary consort, of the Hešeri clan (側福晉 赫舍里氏)
  - Zailian, Prince of the Third Rank (貝勒 載濂; 8 October 1854 – 13 November 1917), first son
  - Zaiyi, Prince Duan of the Second Rank (端郡王 載漪; 26 August 1856 – 10 January 1923), second son
  - Fifth daughter (b. 17 December 1857)
    - Married Kunlin (堃林) of the Manchu Tunggiya clan in March/April 1873
  - Zaiying, Prince of the Third Rank (貝勒 載瀛; 14 February 1859 – 18 August 1930), fourth son
  - Zaisheng (載泩; 6 April 1860 – 21 June 1864), sixth son
- Secondary consort, of the Wanggiya clan (側福晉 王佳氏)
  - Zaijin, General of the First Rank (鎮國將軍 載津; 13 April 1859 – 7 March 1896), fifth son

Concubine

- Mistress, of the Li clan (李氏)
  - Second daughter (20 November 1854 – 15 August 1855)
  - Zaitong (載浵; 11 May 1860 – 13 March 1862), seventh son
- Mistress, of the Zhao clan (趙氏)
  - Third daughter (24 December 1854 – 7 May 1855)
  - Zailan, Duke of the Fourth Rank (不入八分輔國公 載瀾; 13 December 1856 – 17 April 1916), third son
  - Seventh daughter (16 October 1859 – 27 January 1876)
    - Married Enming (恩銘) on 30 December 1873
  - Zaihao (載灝; 27 November 1860 – 2 January 1861), eighth son

== Ancestry ==
Yongzheng Emperor (1678–1735)
Qianlong Emperor (1711–1799)
Empress Xiaoshengxian (1692–1777)
Jiaqing Emperor (1760–1820)
Qingtai
Empress Xiaoyichun (1727–1775)
Lady Yanggiya
Daoguang Emperor (1782–1850)
Chang'an
He'erjing'e
Lady Ligiya
Empress Xiaoshurui (1760–1797)
Lady Wanggiya
Yicong (1831–1889)
Jiufu
Consort Xiang (1808–1861)

== See also ==
- Prince Dun
- Royal and noble ranks of the Qing dynasty § Male members
- Ranks of imperial consorts in China § Qing
