= Prince Dun =

Qing Dynasty royal rank

Prince Dun of the First Rank

Chinese name
- Traditional Chinese: 和碩惇親王
- Simplified Chinese: 和硕惇亲王
Transcriptions
Standard Mandarin
- Hanyu Pinyin: héshuò dūn qīnwáng
- Wade–Giles: ho-shuo tun ch'in-wang

Manchu name
- Manchu script: ᡥᠣᡧᠣᡳ ᠵᡳᠩᠵᡳ ᠴᡳᠨ ᠸᠠᠩ
- Romanization: hošoi jingji cin wang

Prince Dun of the First Rank, or simply Prince Dun, was the title of a princely peerage used in China during the Manchu-led Qing dynasty (1644–1912). As the Prince Dun peerage was not awarded "iron-cap" status, this meant that each successive bearer of the title would normally start off with a title downgraded by one rank vis-à-vis that held by his predecessor. However, the title would generally not be downgraded to any lower than a feng'en fuguo gong except under special circumstances.

The first bearer of the title was Miankai (綿愷; 1795–1838), the Jiaqing Emperor's third son, who was made "Prince Dun of the First Rank" in 1821. The title was passed down over four generations and held by five persons.

== Members of the Prince Dun peerage ==
Members of the Prince Cheng peerage
- Miankai (綿愷; 1795–1838), the Jiaqing Emperor's third son, made a junwang (second-rank prince) in 1819, promoted to qinwang (first-rank prince) in 1821 under the title "Prince Dun of the First Rank", demoted to junwang in 1827 but restored as qinwang in 1828, demoted to junwang again in 1838, posthumously restored as qinwang in 1838 and honoured as Prince Dunke of the First Rank (惇恪親王)
  - Yizuan (奕纘; 1818–1821), Miankai's eldest son, held the title of a buru bafen fuguo gong, posthumously honoured as a beile
  - Yicong (1831–1889), the Daoguang Emperor's fifth son and Miankai's adopted son, initially a junwang, demoted to beile, then restored as a junwang in 1856 and promoted to qinwang in 1860, posthumously honoured as Prince Dunqin of the First Rank (惇勤親王)
    - Zailian (載濂; 1854–1917), Yicong's eldest son, initially a second class zhenguo jiangjun, promoted to buru bafen zhenguo gong in 1864, promoted to feng'en fuguo gong in 1871, made a beile and an acting junwang in 1889, stripped of his title in 1900
      - Puxiu (溥修; 1896–1956), Zailian's second son and Zaijin's adopted son, held the title of a second class zhenguo jiangjun from 1896 to 1915
    - Zaiyi (1856–1923), Yicong's fifth son, adopted by Yizhi (奕誌; 1827–1850) into the Prince Rui peerage, held the title "Prince Duan of the Second Rank" (端郡王) from 1894 to 1900
      - Puzhuan (溥僎; 1875–1920), Zaiyi's eldest son, held the title of a first class zhenguo jiangjun from 1894 to 1920
        - Yu'an (毓侒; 1893–1979), Puzhuan's son
      - Pujun (溥儁; 1885–1942), Zaiyi's second son, held the title of a buru bafen fuguo gong from 1901 to 1942
        - Yuwei (毓巍; 1912–1998), Pujun's son
    - Zailan (載瀾; 1856–1916), Yicong's third son, initially a third class fuguo jiangjun, promoted to second class zhenguo jiangjun in 1884, promoted to buru bafen fuguo gong in 1889, stripped of his title in 1900, posthumously restored as a buru bafen fuguo gong
      - Puzhuo (溥倬; 1882–1932), Zailan's son
        - Yujun (毓峻; 1905–?), Puzhuo's son
    - Zaiying (載瀛; 1859–1930), Yicong's fourth son, initially a second class zhenguo jiangjun, made an acting buru bafen fuguo gong in 1894, promoted to beile in 1900, posthumously honoured as Gongke Beile (恭恪貝勒)
      - Puxian (溥僩; 1901–1966), Zaiying's fifth son, held the title of a beizi from 1930
        - Yuyue (毓岄; 1922–1992), Puxian's son
      - Puquan (溥佺; 1913–1992), Zaiying's sixth son and Zaijin's adopted son, held the title of a second class zhenguo jiangjun from 1915 to 1945
    - Zaijin (載津; 1859–1896), Yicong's fifth son, initially a second class zhenguo jiangjun, made an acting buru bafen fuguo gong in 1894, had no male heir

== Family tree ==
Family of Prince Dun

adoption
Yongyan 顒琰 (1760–1820); Jiaqing Emperor 嘉慶帝 (1796–1820)
Minning 旻寧 (1782–1850); Daoguang Emperor 道光帝 (1820–1850)	Miankai 綿愷 (1795–1838); Prince Dunke of the First Rank 惇恪親王 (posthumously awarded)
Yicong 奕誴 (1831–1889); Prince Dunqin of the First Rank 惇勤親王 (1860–1889)	Yizuan 奕纘 (1818–1821); Beile 貝勒 (posthumously awarded)
Zailian 載濂 (1854–1917); Beile and Acting Junwang 郡王銜貝勒 (1889–1900)	Zaiyi 載漪 (1856–1922); Prince Duan of the Second Rank 端郡王 (1894–1900)	Zailan 載瀾 (1856–1916); Buru Bafen Fuguo Gong 不入八分輔國公 (posthumously awarded)	Zaiying 載瀛 (1859–1930); Gongke Beile 恭恪貝勒 (1900–1930)	Zaijin 載津 (1859–1896); Second Class Zhenguo Jiangjun and Acting Buru Bafen Fuguo Gong 不入八分輔國公銜二等鎮國將軍 (1894–1896)
Puxiu 溥修 (1896–1956); Second Class Zhenguo Jiangjun 二等鎮國將軍 (1896–1915)	Puzhuan 溥僎 (1875–1920); First Class Zhenguo Jiangjun 一等鎮國將軍 (1894–1920)	Pujun 溥儁 (1885–1942); Buru Bafen Fuguo Gong 不入八分輔國公 (1901–1942)	Puzhuo 溥倬 (1882–1932)	Puxian 溥僩 (1901–1966); Beizi 貝子 (1930–1945)	Puquan 溥佺 (1913–1992); Second Class Zhenguo Jiangjun 二等鎮國將軍 (1915–1945)
Yu'an 毓侒 (1893–1979)	Yuwei 毓巍 (1912–1998)	Yujun 毓峻 (1905–?)	Yuyue 毓岄 (1922–1992)

== See also ==
- Royal and noble ranks of the Qing dynasty
- Prince Rui (瑞)
- Prince Fu
