= List of Qing dynasty non-imperial titles =

The following list represents all recipients of the Qing dynasty non-imperial noble titles decreasingly. The list also includes pre-standard titles existing prior to the formalisation of rank system and pre-standard titles granted solely to meritous officials which were similar to the titles normally granted to imperial clansmen.

== Standard nobility titles ==
=== Duke (公) ===
The following table includes ducal titles granted to meritorious officials, including founders of the Qing dynasty, participants and coadjutors of Qing dynasty military campaigns and regents upon the underage emperors and also titles granted to families of the most famous people in the history of China (四氏). Revoked titles are not included. Some of the officials were enshrined in the Imperial Ancestral Temple together with the most notable imperial princes, emperors and their consorts. Another meritorious officials were enshrined in the Temple of Worthies (贤良祠).

Date	Rank	Title	Recipient	Clan	Notes	References
1650s	Not specified	Duke Yongqin (勇勤公, meaning "brave and diligent")	Hohori (何和礼)	Donggo	One of the 5 founders of Qing dynasty, prince consort of Princess Duanzhuang of the First Rank	
1632	Not specified	Duke Zhiyi (直义公)	Fiongdon	Gūwalgiya	One of the 5 founders of Qing dynasty, prince consort of Cuyen's first daughter	
1681	Not specified	Duke Hongyi (弘毅公)	Eidu	Niohuru	One of the 5 founders of Qing dynasty, prince consort of Princess Mukushen	
1643	Not specified	Duke Yansheng	Senior northern branch of Confucius		The title was granted as early as in 1005	
1720s	1	Duke Xiongyong (一等雄勇公)	Tulai	Gūwalgiya	Defector of the Li Zicheng and son of Fiongdon	
1713	1	Duke Chaowu (一等超武公)	Oboi	Gūwalgiya	One of the Four Regents of the Kangxi Emperor	
1681	1	Duke Zhongda (一等忠达公)	Tuhai	Magiya	Defector of the rebellion of Three Feudatories	
1731	1	Duke Yingcheng (一等英诚公)	Yangguri	Šumuru	Title was granted for the merits during Manchu conquest of Korea in 1637	
1667	1	Duke Haicheng（海澄公)	Huang Wu	Huang	A participant of military campaigns of Qing dynasty under the command of Shang Kexi	
1723	1	Duke Zhonglie (一等忠烈公)	Yangzheng	Tunggiya	Grandfather of Empress Xiaokangzhang	
1723	1	Duke Baoji (一等褒绩公)	Laita	Namdulu	Defector of Li Zicheng's rebellion, descendant of Kangguri, one of 16 ministers of Nurhaci	
1750	1	Duke Zhongyong (一等忠勇公)	Fuheng	Fuca clan	Title awarded for the merits during Jinchuan campaigns	
1755	1	Duke Chengyong (一等成勇公)	Bandi	Borjigin		
1755	1	Duke Chaoyong (超勇公)	Salar		Granted for the merits during Xinjiang wars	
1755	1	Duke Xuanche (旋撤公)	Seleng	Niohuru	Granted for the merits during Zunghar wars	
1758	1	Duke Wuyi Mouyong (武毅谋勇公)	Zhaohui	Uya	Granted for quelling Revolt of the Altishahr Khojas	
1776	1	Duke Guoyi Jiyong (果毅继勇公)	Fengshengge	Niohuru	Granted for merits during Jinchuan campaigns	
1792	1	Duke Chaoyong (超勇公)	Hailancha	Duola'er	Granted for pacification of Gurkha tribes	
1793	1	Duke Jiayong Zhongrui（嘉勇忠锐）	Fuk'anggan	Fuca clan	Granted for merits during Sino-nepalese wars and quelling Lin Shuangwen's rebellion. Promoted to second-rank prince	
1798	1	Duke Zhongxiang (忠襄公)	Heshen	Niohuru	Title revoked later in 1799.	
1826	1	Duke Weiyong (威勇公）	Changling	Sartuk (萨尔图克氏)	Granted for pacification of Taiwan uprising in 1787, White Lotus Rebellion in 1813 and victory against Jahangir Khoja in 1826	
1647	2		Inggurdai (英俄尔岱)	Tatara clan	Granted for successful military campaigns during transition from Ming to Qing and multiple missions to Choseon aiming to gain support for Manchus	
1731	2	Duke Guoyi (果毅公)	Turgei	Niohuru	Conqueror of Yanzhou, prince consort of Princess Mukushen	
1627	3	Duke Yongqin (勇勤公)	Hošotu (和硕图)	Donggo	Son of Hohori who inherited the title due to his merits during the conquest of Ming	
1698	3	Duke Zhaowu (昭武公)	Feiyanggu	Donggo	participant of early Qing military campaigns, including fight against Revolt of the Three Feudatories, Battle of Ulan Butung, general of Xi'an and Shaanxi	
1723	3	Duke Weixin (威信公)	Yue Zhongqi	Yue	Granted for merits during Dzungar–Qing Wars in Tibet and Qinghai in 1720	
1755	3	Duke Xinyong (信勇公)	Mamut (玛木特)	Hojam	Granted for collaboration with Qing dynasty during Conquest of Dzungar in 1753	
1805	3	Duke Weiyong Zhongyi (威勇忠毅)	Eldemboo (额勒登保)	Gūwalgiya	Granted for pacification of Miao uprising in 1795	
1809	3	Duke Jiyong (继勇公)	Delertei (德楞泰)	Wumit (伍弥特)	Granted for pacification of Taiwan revolt, Gurkhas, Miao and White Lotus Rebellion	

==== Duke Cheng'en (承恩公) ====
The following table includes fathers and brothers of empresses and empresses dowagers. Title could not be revoked. Mongolian princes who held royal titles are not included.

Class	Recipient	Clan	Empress	Emperor	References
1	Tulai	Tunggiya	Empress Xiaokangzhang	Shunzhi Emperor	
1	Guogang	Tunggiya	Empress Xiaokangzhang	Shunzhi Emperor	
1	Guowei	Tunggiya	Empress Xiaoyiren	Kangxi Emperor	
1	Gabula (general)	Hešeri	Empress Xiaochengren	Kangxi Emperor	
1	Weiwu	Uya	Empress Xiaogongren	Kangxi Emperor	
1	Boqi	Uya	Empress Xiaogongren	Kangxi Emperor	
1	Fiyanggu	Ulanara	Empress Xiaojingxian	Yongzheng Emperor	
1	Lingzhu	Niohuru	Empress Xiaoshengxian	Yongzheng Emperor	
1	Lirongbao	Fuca clan	Empress Xiaoxianchun	Qianlong Emperor	
3	Wei Qingtai	Wei (魏)	Empress Xiaoyichun	Qianlong Emperor	
3	He'erjing'e	Hitara	Empress Xiaoshurui	Jiaqing Emperor	
1	Gunggala	Niohuru	Empress Xiaoherui	Jiaqing Emperor	
3	Buyandalai	Niohuru	Empress Xiaomucheng	Daoguang Emperor	
1	Shuming'a	Tunggiya	Empress Xiaoshencheng	Daoguang Emperor	
3	Yiling	Niohuru	Empress Xiaoquancheng	Daoguang Emperor	
1	Jilamin	Khorchin Borjigin	Empress Xiaojingcheng	Daoguang Emperor	
Not specified	Futai	Sakda	Empress Xiaodexian	Xianfeng Emperor	
3	Muyangga	Niohuru	Empress Dowager Ci'an	Xianfeng Emperor	
3	Huizheng	Yehe-Nara	Empress Dowager Cixi	Xianfeng Emperor	
3	Chongqi	Arute Hala	Empress Xiaozheyi	Tongzhi Emperor	
3	Guixiang	Yehe-Nara	Empress Dowager Longyu	Guangxu Emperor	

=== Marquis (侯) ===
Class	Year	Title	Recipient	Clan	Notes	References
Not specified	1644	Marquis Dingxi (定西侯)	Tang Tong (唐通)	Tang	Title granted for the merits during Battle of Songshan in 1641 and collaboration with Qing dynasty. Title revoked after participation in raids with Li Zicheng	
Not specified	1645	Marquis Gongshun (恭顺侯)	Wu Weihua (吴惟华)	Wu	Retained the title of Count Gongshun (恭顺伯) granted by the Ming dynasty. Title elevated for his contributions during transition from Ming to Qing, especially conquest of Shanxi and support to Dorgon.	
Not specified	1653	Marquis Tong'an (同安侯)	Zheng Zhilong	Zheng	Title granted for defection and collaboration with Qing in 1644.	
Not specified	1659	Marquis Muyi (义侯)	Tan Hong (谭宏)	Tan	Title granted for reconquest of Chongqing and later surrender to Qing	
Not specified	1659	Marquis Xianghua (向化侯)	Tan Yi (谭诣)	Tan	Title granted for reconquest of Chongqing and later surrender to Qing	
Not specified	1663	Marquis Zunyi (遵义侯)	Zheng Mingjun (郑鸣骏)	Zheng	Title granted for collaboration with Qing dynasty	
Not specified	1678	Marquis Jianyi (建义侯)	Lin Xingzhu	Lin	Title granted for contribution to Qing conquest of Jiangxi and elimination of Wu Sangui's feudatory	
1	1749	Marquis Shunqin (一等顺勤侯)	Ma Degong (马得功)	Ma	Title granted posthumously	
1	1675	Marquis Jingni (一等靖逆侯)	Zhang Yong (张勇)	Zhang	Title granted for the quell of Revolt of the Three Feudatories	
1	1725	Marquis Yan'en	Zhu Zhlian (朱之琏)	Zhu	Title granted to the cadet branch of the House of Zhu, ruling clan of the Ming dynasty	
1	1684	Marquis Jinghai (靖海侯)	Shi Lang	Shi	Title granted for military campaign in Taiwan	
1	1701	Marquis Zhaowu (昭武侯)	Chentai	Donggo		
1	1727		Funing'an (富宁安)	Fuca clan	Granted for contribution in Zhungar war in 1717	
1	1797		Fuchang'an	Fuca clan	Granted for civil cervice.Title revoked in 1801	
1	1802	Marquis Weiyong Zhongyi	Eldemboo	Gūwalgiya	Granted for quelling White Lotus rebellion	
1	1814	Marquis Weiqin (一等威勤侯)	Lebao	Feimo	Granted posthumously	
1	1833	Marquis Guoyong (果勇侯)	Yang Fang (杨芳)	Yang	Granted for quelling Jahangir Hoja's rebellion. Demoted by 1 class in 1834.	
1	1835	Marquis Zhaoyong (昭勇侯)	Yang Maichun (杨迈春)	Yang	Granted for quelling White Lotus sect in 1797 and Jahangir Hoja	
1	1864	Marquis Yiyong (毅勇侯)	Zeng Guofan	Zeng	Granted for quelling Taiping rebellion	
1	1892	Marquis Suyi	Li Hongzhang	Li	Granted for quelling Taiping and Nian rebellions	
2	1661	Marquis Shunyi (顺义侯)	Tian Xiong	Tian	Granted for elimination of Koxinga	
2	1879	Marquis Kejing (恪靖侯)	Zuo Zongtang	Zuo	Granted for quelling Taiping rebellion, Nian rebellion and Hui rebellion	
3	1653	Marquis Maolie (懋烈侯)	Li Guohan (李国翰)	Li	Granted for the merits during military campaign in Sichuan	
3	1681	Marquis Jinghai (靖海侯)	Shi Lang	Shi	Granted for liquidation and conquest of Kingdom of Tungning	
3	1776	Marquis Guoyong (果勇侯)	Horonggo (和隆武)	Magiya	Granted for merits during military campaigns in Jinchuan	
3	1819	Marquis Xiangyong (襄勇侯)	Mingliang	Fuca clan	Granted for the merits during military campaigns in Jinchuan, conquest of Qashgar and putting down the White Lotus rebellion	

=== Count (伯) ===
Class	Year	Title	Recipient	Clan	Notes	References
1	1650		Lengsenggi (冷僧机)	Nara clan	Bondservant of Princess Mangguji， close advisor to Dorgon and one of the regents over premature Shunzhi Emperor	
1	1652	Count Zhaoxin (昭信伯)	Bayan (霸严)	Li	Granted for Conquest of Sichuan and Shaanxi during Transition from Ming to Qing	
1	1755	Count Qinxiang (勤襄伯)				
2						
3						

=== Viscount (子) ===
Class	Year	Title	Recipient	Clan	Notes	References
1						
2						
3						

=== Baron (男) ===
Class	Year	Title	Recipient	Clan	Notes	References
1						
2		Second Class Baron (二等男)		Panggiya (庞佳)		
3						
