= Hongxiao, Prince Yi =

Hongxiao
- Prince Yi of the First Rank

Prince Yi of the First Rank
- Tenure: 1730–1778
- Predecessor: Yinxiang
- Successor: Yonglang
- Born: 23 May 1722; Beijing
- Died: 11 April 1778 (aged 55)
- Burial: Laishui County
- Consorts: Lady Ligiya; Lady Tunggiya
- Issue: See § Family
Names
- Hongxiao (弘曉)
Posthumous name
- Prince Yixi of the First Rank (怡僖親王)
- House: Aisin Gioro
- Father: Yinxiang
- Mother: Imperial Princess Consort Yixian, of the Joogiya clan

Hongxiao (Chinese: 弘曉, Manchu: ᡥᡡᠩ ᡥᡳᠶᠣᡠ, hūng hiyoo; 3 May 1722 – 11 May 1778) was Qing dynasty imperial prince as the seventh son of Yinxiang, Prince Yixian of the First Rank, paternal cousin of the Qianlong Emperor and Kangxi Emperor's grandson. The second in the Prince Yi of the First Rank lineage, Hongxiao became famous through his poetry and relationship with Cao Xueqin, one of the most famous Chinese writers.

== Life ==
Hongxiao was born on 3 May 1722 to primary princess consort Yixian of the First Rank, lady Joogiya. He had two biological sisters, including Princess Hehui of the Second Rank who was adopted into the palace since she was young, and two surviving biological brothers, including Hongjiao, Prince Ningliang of the Second Rank. On 21 June 1730, Hongxiao inherited the Prince Yi of the First Rank title as the peerage was granted iron-cap status. His younger brother was granted a title of Prince Ning of the Second Rank. Hongxiao was not implicated in the Coup of Hongxi in 1739, unlike his brother, who was deprived of his allowance

In 1766, Hongxiao's mother died, leaving him a portion of blood. In 1767, Hongxiao and his nephew Yongkun behaved in a disrespectful manner during a national mourning (they did not wear mourning garment). However, the punishment was delayed due to Fuheng's urging. In 1768, a promotional ceremony of imperial princes was organised after the sacrificial rites at the Temple of Agriculture. A list of the princes promoted at the same time included Hongzhou, Prince He of the First Rank; Yongchang, Prince Zhuang and Guanglu; Prince Yu of the First Rank.

In August 1777, when Hongxiao made sacrifices at the Imperial Ancestral Temple together with Prince Guo of the Second Rank, the prince failed to observe etiquette and was tried by the Imperial Clan Court. The arrest was replaced by deprivation of Hongxiao's salary in the following month.

Hongxiao died on 11 May 1778 and was posthumously honoured as Prince Yixi of the First Rank (和硕怡僖亲王, meaning "harmonious and precautious").

=== Relationship with Cao Xueqin ===
Since his youth, Hongxiao had been known for his interest in poetry. His most notable art works include "Series of the Hall of the Four Pines" (《四松堂集》) and "Poems of the Hall of the Bright Kindness" (《明善堂集》). He was befriended with the intellectualists of the Qianlong era, e.g. Cao Xueqin. When Cao Xueqin's family experienced a downfall, which might result in confiscation of his property, Hongxiao preserved the drafts of the Dream of the Red Chamber. The reminiscences of their relationship were included in Hongxiao's poetry.

It was disputed by redologists that second characters of Yinxiang's and Hongxiao's personal names drew the outline of the plot of the original edition of "Dream of the Redchamber". However, the poor quality of Hongxiao's edition rose issues among the redologists whether those characters were included in the original text. Moreover, new scholarship undermines Hongxiao's contribution to drafts of the novel claiming that imperial prince could not have such abilities, hence the poems were written by ghostwriters.

=== The further fate of poetry and Prince Yi collection ===
The poetry of Hongxiao remained unknown until the publication in the "Collection of the Prince Yi Manor" by Weng Tonghe, Yang Shaohe and Shen Zuyin. The collection included Hongxiao's poetry, Tibetan books dating back to the 17th century and calligraphy paintings with in summary 10 seals. Most books possessed by Hongxiao and his descendants were not included in "Siku Quanshu", that's why they were made public in the 19th century.

== Family ==
Hongxiao was married to lady Ligiya, daughter of Bohege (伯赫格). Later, he married lady Tunggiya, daughter of Changsheng (长盛). Hongxiao had in summary 9 sons and nine daughters.

Consorts:

Primary Consort

- Primary consort, of the Ligiya clan (嫡福晋李佳氏)
  - Yonghang, Third Class Defender General (镇国将军 永杭, 25 December 1744 – 4 June 1777), first son
  - Third son (10 May 1750 – 11 May 1750)

Secondary Consort

- Second primary consort, of the Tunggiya clan (继福晋佟佳氏)
  - Princess of the Third Rank (郡主), ninth daughter
    - Married Mubaledan of the Harqin league in 1779.
- Secondary consort, of the Jin clan (侧福晋金氏)
- Secondary consort, of the Shi clan (侧福晋石氏)
  - Yonglang, Prince Yigong of the First Rank(怡恭亲王永琅: 5 May 1746 – 1 September 1799), second son
- Secondary consort, of the Irgen Gioro clan (侧福晋伊尔根觉罗氏)
  - Sixth son (15 July 1766 - 20 December 1766)
  - Seventh son (1770 - 1771)
  - Yongmai, Third Class Bulwark General (三等辅国将军 永迈; 18 December 1772 – 26 April 1799), eighth son

Concubine

- Mistress, of the Xu clan (庶福晋徐氏)
  - Yonghe (永和; April 1783 – 28 November 1784)
- Mistress, of the Xiang clan (庶福晋祥氏)
- Mistress, of the Ma clan (庶福晋马氏)
  - Yongman (永蔓; 5 September 1752 – 15 March 1808), fourth son
- Mistress, of the Bayara clan (庶福晋巴雅拉氏)
  - Fifth son ( 22 July 1757 – 6 January 1758)
- Unknown:
- First daughter
  1. Married Jiminzhu'er Dorji of the Khorchin Borjigin clan.
- Second Daughter
- Third Daughter
- Fourth Daughter
  - Married Manduhu of the Onnigud Borjigin clan in 1768
- Ffith Daughter
- Sixth Daughter
- Seventh Daughter
- Eight Daughter
- Princess of the Third Rank (郡主). Married Mubaledan of the Harqin league in 1779.

== In fiction and popular culture ==
- Portrayed by Xu Ziming in Succession War (TV series) (2018)
- Portrayed by Cheng Junwen in Story of Yanxi Palace (2018)
