= Tong Guowei =

Qing dynasty official (died 1719)

First Class Duke Tong Guowei

Deliberative Minister
- In office 1682–1689

Personal details
- Born: 1644?
- Died: 1719
- Children: Longkodo (son), Qingfu (son), Empress Xiaoyiren (daughter), Imperial Noble Consort Quehui (daughter)
- Parent: Tulai (father)
- Relatives: Tong Guogang (brother), Empress Xiaokangzhang (sister)
- Clan name: Tong (佟), later Tunggiya (佟佳)
- Posthumous name: Duanchun (端純)

Military service
- Allegiance: Qing dynasty
- Branch/service: Han Chinese Plain Blue Banner (until 1688); Manchu Bordered Yellow Banner (since 1688)
- Battles/wars: Dzungar–Qing Wars

Tong Guowei

Chinese name
- Traditional Chinese: 佟國維
- Simplified Chinese: 佟国维
Transcriptions
Standard Mandarin
- Hanyu Pinyin: Tóng Guówéi

Manchu name
- Manchu script: ᡨᡠ᠋ᠩ ᡤᡠᠸᡝ ᠸᡝᡳ
- Romanization: tung guwe wei

Tong Guowei (died 1719) was a Qing dynasty official. He was a maternal uncle of Kangxi Emperor.

== Life ==
Tong Guowei was the second (or the third) son of Tulai. According to the Comprehensive history of Eight Banners (欽定八旗通志), The Tong (佟) family from Fushun was a sinicized Jurchen clan, they were incorporated into the Han Chinese Plain Blue Banner. However, Pamela Kyle Crossley stated that they were actually Han Chinese and falsely claimed to be related to the Manchu Tunggiya (佟佳) clan of Jilin, using this false claim to get themselves transferred to a Manchu banner in the reign of the Kangxi Emperor. The Tong family was the most powerful family during the Kangxi period, thus got the nickname "Tong Ban Chao" (佟半朝), which meant "the Tong who fill up half the Court".

In 1674, after the Revolt of the Three Feudatories had begun, Wu Yingxiong, the eldest son of Wu Sangui, plotted a riot in Beijing. Hearing of the plan, Tong Guowei quickly arrested the ringleaders with the aid of thirty guards. He was appointed the commander of the imperial bodyguard (領侍衛內大臣) and Deliberative Ministers in 1682. In 1689 he was granted the hereditary rank First class Duke (一等公). He fought against Dzungars in the Battle of Ulan Butung, in which his brother Tong Guogang was killed in action. Tong Guowei was held responsible for not taking advantage of the victory to pursue the enemy during the battle, and was dismissed from his post as Deliberative Ministers. He accompanied Kangxi on both of the latter's expeditions against Galdan in 1696 and in 1697.

Tong Guowei died in 1719. He was given the posthumous name Duanchun (端純) and awarded posthumous appointment of Grand Tutor (太傅) by Yongzheng Emperor in 1723.

Tong Guogang and Tong Guowei were said to believe in Christianity, though their political lives prohibited their formal conversions. They maintained close relationships with two Jesuit missionaries, Lodovico Buglio and Gabriel de Magalhães.

== Family ==
- Father: Tulai
- Mother: Lady Gioro
- Siblings:
  - Elder sister: Empress Xiaokangzhang (mother of Kangxi Emperor)
  - Elder brother: Tong Guoji (佟國紀)?
  - Elder brother: Tong Guogang (佟國綱)
- Wife: Lady Hešeri
- Children:
  - Eldest son: Yekeshu (葉克書), father of Sunggayan (舜安顏)
  - Second son: Dekesi (德克新)
  - Third son: Longkodo
  - Fourth son: Hongshan (洪善)
  - Fifth son: Qingyuan (慶元)
  - Sixth son: Qingfu (慶復)
  - Daughter: Empress Xiaoyiren
  - Daughter: Imperial Noble Consort Quehui
