= Empress Tunggiya =

Empress Tunggiya may refer to:

- Empress Xiaokangzhang (1640–1663), concubine of the Shunzhi Emperor who became an empress dowager
- Empress Xiaoyiren (died 1689), wife of the Kangxi Emperor
- Empress Xiaoshencheng (1792–1833), wife of the Daoguang Emperor
