= Tong Guogang =

Qing dynasty official (died 1690)

First Class Duke Tong Guogang
- Born: c. 1634?
- Died: 3 September 1690; Ulan Butung (in today's Hexigten Banner, Chifeng, Inner Mongolia, China)
- Military career
- Allegiance: (Qing dynasty) Qing Dynasty
- Branch: Han Chinese Plain Blue Banner (until 1688); Manchu Bordered Yellow Banner (since 1688)
- Conflicts: Chahar Rebellion (1675); Dzungar–Qing Wars

Tong Guogang

Chinese name
- Traditional Chinese: 佟國綱
- Simplified Chinese: 佟国纲
Transcriptions
Standard Mandarin
- Hanyu Pinyin: Tóng Guógāng

Manchu name
- Manchu script: ᡨᡠ᠋ᠩ ᡤᡠᠸᡝ ᡬᠠᠩ
- Romanization: tung guwe g῾ang

Tong Guogang (died 3 September 1690) was a Qing dynasty official. He was a maternal uncle of Kangxi Emperor.

Tong Guogang was the first (or the second) son of Tulai. According to the Comprehensive history of Eight Banners (欽定八旗通志), The Tong (佟) family from Fushun was a sinicized Jurchen clan, they were incorporated into the Han Chinese Plain Blue Banner. However, Pamela Kyle Crossley stated that they were actually Han Chinese and falsely claimed to be related to the Manchu Tunggiya (佟佳) clan of Jilin, using this false claim to get themselves transferred to a Manchu banner in the reign of the Kangxi Emperor.

In 1662, Tong Guogang succeeded to the hereditary rank Third class jinkini hafan and appointed the deputy commander of the imperial bodyguard (內大臣). In 1675 he assisted Oja (鄂扎) in the suppression of the rebellion of the Chahar Mongols led by Bürni (布爾尼) and was designated North Pacifying General (安北將軍). In 1677, Tong Tulai was granted the hereditary rank First class Duke (一等公) posthumously, Tong Guogang inherited this rank in the same time.

Tong Guogang was one of the members of the mission to Russia in 1688 led by Songgotu, which was dedicated to resolving border disputes between China and Russia. In the next year a border treaty was signed in Nerchinsk, the signatories were Songgotu on behalf of the Chinese emperor and Fyodor Alexeyevich Golovin on behalf of the Russian tsars. Songgotu's signature was followed by those of Tong Guogang, Langtan (郎坦), Bandarša (班達爾沙), Sabsu (薩布素), Mala (瑪喇) and Unda (温達).

Tong Guogang was killed in action by Dzungars in the Battle of Ulan Butung. He was given the posthumous name Zhongyong (忠勇) by Kangxi Emperor. After Yongzheng ascended the throne, Tong was awarded posthumous appointment of Grand Tutor (太傅).

Tong Guogang and Tong Guowei were said to believe in Christianity, though their political lives prohibited their formal conversions. They maintained close relationships with two Jesuit missionaries, Lodovico Buglio and Gabriel de Magalhães.

== Family ==
- Father: Tulai
- Mother: Lady Gioro
- Siblings:
  - Eldest sister: Empress Xiaokangzhang (mother of Kangxi Emperor)
  - Eldest brother: Tong Guoji (佟國紀)?
  - Younger brother: Tong Guowei (佟國維)(father of Empress Xiaoyiren)
- Sons:
  - Eldest son: Olondai, served as the commander of the imperial bodyguard (領侍衛內大臣)
  - Second son: Fahai, served as minister of War from 1726 to 1727
  - Third son: Kūwadai, served as minister of Works from 1727 to 1729
