= Consort Ningque =

Imperial consort of the Qing dynasty

- 寧愨妃
- Born: Unknown
- Died: 11 August 1694; Residence of Prince Yu, Beijing, Qing dynasty
- Burial: Xiao Mausoleum, Eastern Qing tombs
- Spouse: Shunzhi Emperor
- Issue: Fuquan, Prince Yuxian
- House: Donggo (董鄂; by birth); Aisin-Gioro (by marriage)
- Father: Kajihai

Consort Ningque (寧愨妃 董鄂氏; ? – 11 August 1694) of the Manchu Plain White Banner Donggo clan, was an imperial consort of the Qing dynasty second ruler, Shunzhi Emperor.

== Life ==
=== Family background ===
Lady Donggo's personal name was not recorded in history. Her family belonged to the Plain White Banner, Donggo clan, same as Empress Xiaoxian. Conform records, borth Consort Ningque and Empress Xiaoxian had their ancestral home in Liaoning.

- Father: Kajihai (喀济海), a head censor (长史)
  - Grandfather: Dojili (多济理), a second rank military official (副都统)

=== Shunzi Era ===
It is unknown when lady Donggo entered the Imperial City and became one of Emperor Shunzi concubines. She was one of his ranked concubines, enjoying a higher treatment and salary than the others. On 8 September 1653, Concubine Donggo gave birth to her only child, Fuquan, who would later be entitled as Prince Yu of the First Rank (和碩裕親王).

In 1674, together with other concubines, Lady Donggo was promoted to a Consort. After her husband death, Lady Donggo was allowed to live with her son outside the Imperial City. She moved there together with her servants. On 11 August 1694, she died at her son's manor, the Residence of Prince Yu. She was posthumously named Consort Ningque (寧愨妃) and buried in Xiao Mausoleum, Eastern Qing tombs.

== Titles ==
- During the reign of Hong Taiji (r. 1626–1643):
  - Lady Donggo (董鄂氏; from Unknown Date)
- During the reign of the Shunzhi Emperor (r. 1643–1661):
  - Concubine (小福晉)
- During the reign of the Kangxi Emperor (r. 1661–1722):
  - Imperial Consort Ningmi (皇考寧謐妃; from 1673)
  - Consort Ningque (寧愨妃; from 11 August 1694)

== Issue ==
As a concubine:

- Fuquan (福全), Prince Yuxian of the First Rank (裕憲親王; 8 September 1653 – 10 August 1703), Shunzi's second son
