= Yinxiang, Prince Yi =

Prince of the Qing dynasty

Yinxiang
- Prince Yi of the First Rank
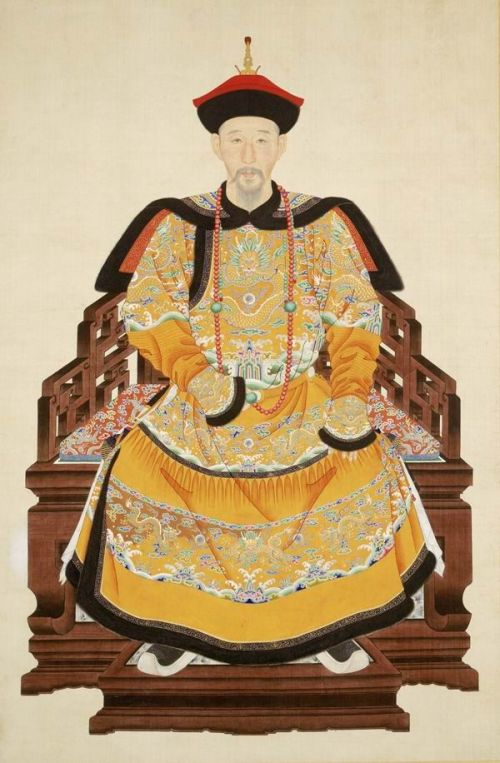
- Portrait of Yinxiang

Prince Yi of the First Rank
- Reign: 24 December 1722 – 18 June 1730
- Predecessor: None
- Successor: Hongxiao

Chief Grand Councillor
- In office: 5 July 1729 – 18 June 1730
- Predecessor: None
- Successor: Marsai
- Born: 16 November 1686; Forbidden City, Beijing, China
- Died: 18 June 1730 (aged 43); Prince Yi’s Mansion, Beijing, China
- Burial: Tomb of Prince Yixian of the First Rank, Laishui County
- Consorts: Lady Joogiya
- Issue: Hongchang; Hongdun; Hongjiao, Prince Ningliang of the Second Rank; Hongqin; Hongxiao, Prince Yixi of the First Rank; Princess of the Third Rank; Princess of the Third Rank; Princess Hehui of the Second Rank
Names
- Yinxiang (1686–1722 & after death) (胤祥); Yunxiang (1722–1730) (允祥)
Posthumous name
- Prince Yi Zhongjing Chengzhi Qinshen Lianming Xian of the First Rank (和碩怡忠敬誠直勤慎廉明賢親王) (full version); Prince Yixian of the First Rank (和碩怡賢親王) (simplified version)
- House: Aisin Gioro
- Father: Kangxi Emperor
- Mother: Imperial Noble Consort Jingmin

Yinxiang
- Chinese: 胤祥
Transcriptions
Standard Mandarin
- Hanyu Pinyin: Yìnxiáng
- Wade–Giles: Y'in-hsiang

Yunxiang
- Chinese: 允祥
Transcriptions
Standard Mandarin
- Hanyu Pinyin: Yǔnxiáng

Yinxiang (16 November 1686 – 18 June 1730), formally known as Prince Yi, was a Manchu prince of the Qing dynasty. The thirteenth son of the Kangxi Emperor, Yinxiang was a major ally of his brother Yinzhen (that is, the Yongzheng Emperor) during the latter's struggle for the succession of the throne. He was made a qinwang (first-grade prince) during Yongzheng's reign and became one of his closest advisors. He died eight years into the reign of the Yongzheng Emperor and was memorialized with top honours by the emperor. When he died, his title was granted "iron-cap" status and became perpetually inheritable without a lowering of rank, one of the only twelve such princes in Qing dynasty history.

== Early life ==
Yinxiang was born in the Aisin Gioro clan as the 13th son of the Kangxi Emperor. The emperor had some 55 recorded consorts. Yinxiang's mother, Imperial Noble Consort Jingmin, was the daughter of the military commander Haikuan (海寬) from the Bordered White Banner. By the same birth mother, Yinxiang had two sisters, both of whom were younger than him. Yinxiang's mother died when he was 14, so he was raised by Consort De, the biological mother of Yinzhen (the future Yongzheng Emperor). This meant that he had an especially close relationship to Yinzhen from a young age.

Yinxiang was schooled in the arts and classics by Fahai, the second son of Tong Guogang, the maternal uncle of the Kangxi Emperor. Fahai was also the imperial tutor to Yinti, the 14th prince who was born to the same mother as Yinzhen. Both of Yinxiang's sisters died young shortly after being named hesuo princess and wedded respectively to Mongol princes. Yinxiang was a favorite of Kangxi from a young age. He accompanied his father on four inspection tours to the south. However, in 1709 when Kangxi bestowed noble titles to his various sons, Yinxiang was not among the recipients; his younger brother Yinti, however, was named a beizi. There is no explanation given in primary sources as to why Yinxiang was not granted a title in spite of seemingly being a favourite of his father.

During the succession battle among Kangxi's sons, Yinxiang was imprisoned by the Kangxi Emperor for 10 years. The historical record makes nearly no mention of Yinxiang between 1712 and 1722. It seems like during these years he did not achieve anything remarkable, but did nonetheless conceive several children.

== Yongzheng era ==
When the Kangxi Emperor died in 1722, Yinzhen succeeded to the throne as the Yongzheng Emperor. In the same year, Yinxiang was granted the title "Prince Yi of the First Rank" (怡親王); this Prince Yi peerage was one of the Qing dynasty's 12 "iron-cap" princely peerages. His personal name was also changed to "Yunxiang" (允祥) to avoid naming taboo because the Chinese character for "Yin" (胤) in "Yinxiang" is the same as the one in the Yongzheng Emperor's personal name "Yinzhen" (胤禛).

Yunxiang was a staunch supporter of the Yongzheng Emperor, and he worked tirelessly to assist the emperor in administering state affairs despite suffering from poor health. Soon after Yongzheng ascended the throne, Yinxiang was named overseer of the three vaults of the Ministry of Revenue. In 1725, Yunxiang was sent to oversee the water issues in Zhili Province, including flood control and transport. He was still constantly affected by ill health when he returned to Beijing later.

Yunxiang died in June 1730 and was granted the posthumous name of "Zhongjing Chengzhi Qinshen Lianming Xian" (忠敬誠直勤慎廉明賢), so his full posthumous title became Prince Yi Zhongjing Chengzhi Qinshen Lianming Xian of the First Rank (和碩怡忠敬誠直勤慎廉明賢親王). The Yongzheng Emperor praised Yunxiang in his eulogy edict and declared a mourning period of three days, during which imperial court sessions were not held. In the edict, the Yongzheng Emperor also granted an exception by allowing Yunxiang's name to be reverted to "Yinxiang".

== Succession of Prince Yi ==
Prince Yi was elevated to an "iron-cap prince" level peerage, that is, the title was to be perpetually inheritable by his successors. Yinxiang's sixth generation descendant Zaiyuan was a regent during the reign of the Tongzhi Emperor and was ousted in a coup.

== Family ==
Primary Consort

- Primary consort, of the Joogiya clan (嫡福晋 兆佳氏)
  - Princess of the Third Rank (郡主; 20 April 1707 – 4 April 1726), 2nd daughter
    - Married Fusengge (富僧額) of the Manchu Irgen Gioro clan in February/March 1723
  - Hongdun, Prince of the Third Rank (貝勒 弘暾; 29 January 1711 – 24 August 1728), 3rd son
  - Hongjiao, Prince Ningliang of the Second Rank (寧良郡王 弘晈; 17 June 1713 – 9 September 1764), 4th son
  - Princess Hehui of the Second Rank (和碩和惠公主; 16 November 1714 – 2 November 1731), 4th daughter
    - Married Dorji Septeng (多爾濟塞布騰; d. 1735) of the Mongol Khalkha Borjigin clan on 6 December 1729
  - Hongkuang (弘㫛; 30 January 1716 – 20 February 1722), 5th son
  - Hongxiao, Prince Yixi of the First Rank (怡僖親王 弘曉; 23 May 1722 – 11 May 1778), 7th son
  - Shou'en (綬恩; 12 October 1725 – 27 August 1727), 8th son

Secondary Consort

- Secondary consort, of the Gūwalgiya clan (側福晉 瓜爾佳氏)
  - Princess of the Third Rank (郡主; 22 August 1703 – 23 February 1776), 1st daughter
    - Married Sakexin (薩克信) of the Jinjili clan (津濟里) in May/June 1721
  - Hongchang, Prince of the Third Rank (貝勒 弘昌; 14 December 1706 – 3 June 1771), 1st son
- Secondary consort, of the Fuca clan (側福晉 富察氏)
  - Third daughter (14 December 1710 – December 1711/January 1712)
- Secondary consort, of the Usun clan (側福晉 烏蘇氏)
  - Hongqin, Prince of the Third Rank (貝勒 弘昑; 24 September 1716 – 28 February 1729), 6th son

Concubine

- Mistress, of the Šigiya clan (石佳氏)
  - Second son (12 November 1708 – 30 March 1709)
- Mistress, of the Nara clan (那拉氏)
  - Amuhulang (阿穆瑚瑯; 6 May 1726 – 5 May 1727), 9th son

== In fiction and popular culture ==
- Portrayed by Zhou Haodong in Legend of YungChing (1997)
- Portrayed by Wang Hui in Yongzheng Dynasty (1999), Li Wei the Magistrate (2001) and Li Wei the Magistrate II (2004)
- Portrayed by Tian Zhenwei in Palace (2011)
- Portrayed by Yuan Hong in Scarlet Heart (2011)
- Portrayed by Chen Xiao in The Palace (2013)
- portrayed by Wang An Yu in Dreaming back to the Qing Dynasty (2019 series) (2019)

== See also ==
- Royal and noble ranks of the Qing dynasty § Male members
- Ranks of imperial consorts in China § Qing
