= Imperial Noble Consort Quehui =

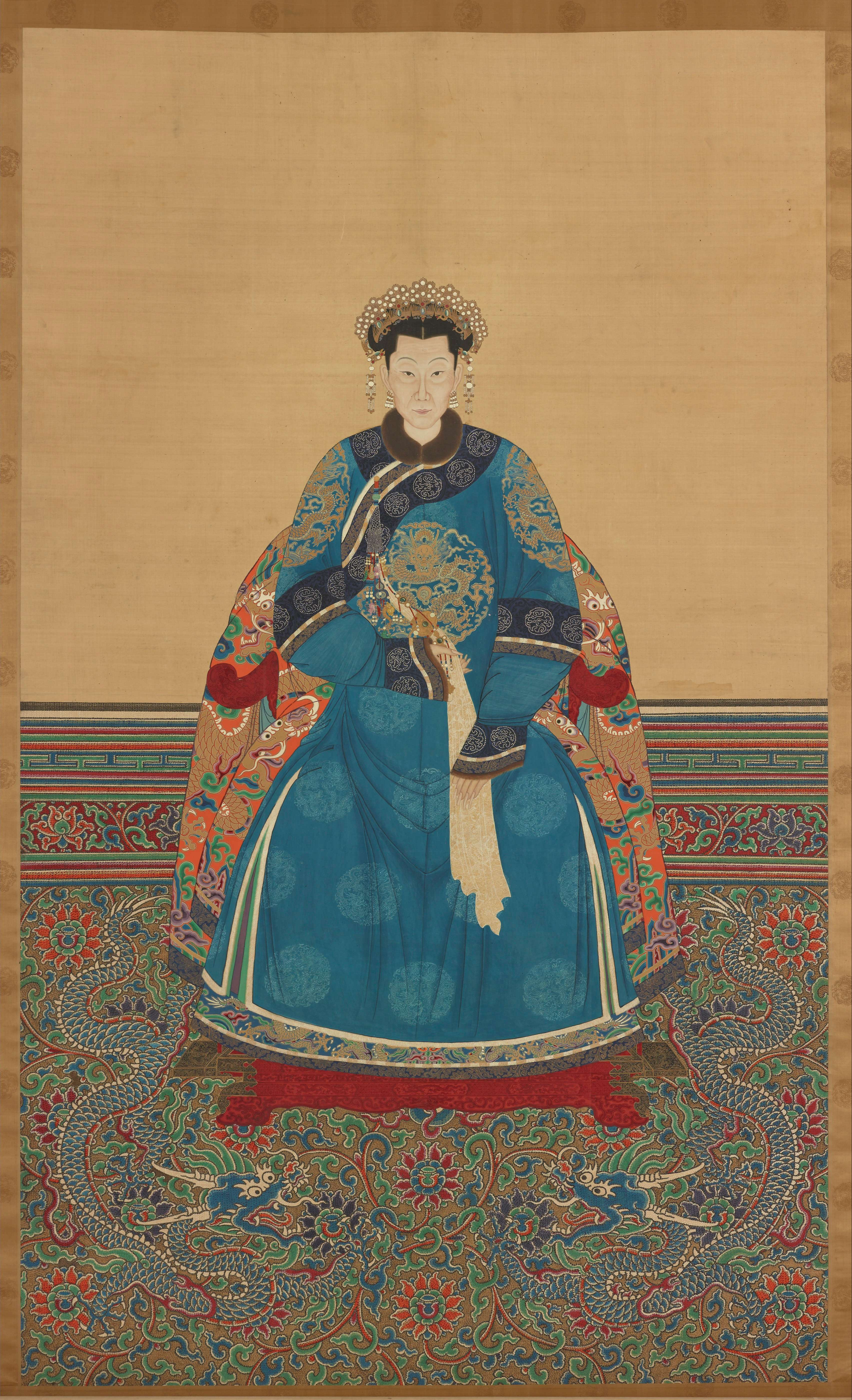
- Born: 1668 (康熙七年 八月)
- Died: 24 April 1743 (aged 74–75) (乾隆八年 四月 一日); Forbidden City, Beijing, Qing dynasty
- Burial: Jing Mausoleum, Eastern Qing tombs
- Spouse: Kangxi Emperor (died 1722)
Posthumous name
- Imperial Noble Consort Quehui (愨惠皇貴妃)
- House: Tong, later Tunggiya (佟佳; by birth); Aisin Gioro (by marriage)
- Father: Tong Guowei

Imperial Noble Consort Quehui
- Traditional Chinese: 愨惠皇貴妃
- Simplified Chinese: 悫惠皇贵妃
Transcriptions
Standard Mandarin
- Hanyu Pinyin: Quèhuì Huángguìfēi

Dowager Imperial Noble Consort Quehui (1668 – 24 April 1743), of the Manchu Bordered Yellow Banner Tunggiya clan, was a consort of the Kangxi Emperor of the Qing dynasty of China. She was 14 years his junior.

== Life ==
=== Family background ===
Imperial Noble Consort Quehui's personal name was not recorded in history. Her family originally belonged to the Han Chinese Plain Blue Banner.

- Father: Guowei (國維; d. 1719), served as a first rank military official (領侍衛內大臣), and held the title of a first class duke (一等公)
  - Paternal grandfather: Tulai (圖賴; 1606–1658), served as a first rank military official (都統), and held the title of a first class duke (一等公)
  - Paternal grandmother: Lady Gioro
  - Paternal aunt: Empress Xiaokangzhang (1638–1663), the mother of the Kangxi Emperor (1654–1722)
- Mother: Lady Hešeri
- Six brothers
  - First brother: Yekeshu (叶克书), father of Shun'anyan
  - Second brother: Dekesi (德克新), served as third class imperial guard
  - Third brother: Longkodo (d. 1728)
  - Fourth brother: Hongshan (洪善)
  - Fifth brother: Qingyuan (庆元)
  - Sixth brother: Qingfu (庆復; d. 1747), served as first rank military official (都統/都统, pinyin: dutong) from 1727 to 1733, Viceroy of Liangjiang, Viceroy of Yunnan, Viceroy of Liangguang in 1741, a Grand Secretary of Wenhua hall (文华殿大学士)
- Elder sister: Empress Xiaoyiren (d. 1689)

=== Kangxi era ===
The future Imperial Noble Consort Quehui was born in 1668. It is not known when lady Tunggiya entered the Forbidden City; historical records state that she was present in 1697 as a consort. By that year, Empress Xiaoyiren, Noble Consort Wenxi and Imperial Noble Consort Jingmin had died, leaving imperial harem without de iure head. Kangxi Emperor didn't instate a new empress, instead granted lady Tunggiya the title "Noble Consort" (贵妃) in January 1701. As she was the only noble consort, she didn't receive any honorific name. In 1706, she received 150 lard fishes, while Empress Dowager Renxian received 50 sesame oil fishes. From 1711, Lady Tunggiya and Consort He were tasked with raising Hongli, a son of Prince Yong of the First Rank, Yinzhen.

=== Yongzheng era ===
After the enthronement of the Yongzheng Emperor in 1722, Lady Tong was promoted to "Imperial Noble Consort" (皇贵妃), but the promotion ceremony was delayed until July 1724 due to national mourning.

=== Qianlong era ===
In 1736, she was given a title "Dowager Imperial Noble Consort Shouqi" (寿祺皇贵妃; "shouqi" meaning "long-living and auspicious"). Imperial Noble Consort Shouqi resided in Palace of Tranquil Longevity together with four grand dowager consorts.

Imperial Noble Consort Shouqi died on 24 April 1743 in her residence. She was granted posthumous title "Imperial Noble Consort Quehui" (悫惠皇贵妃; "quehui" meaning "honest and kind").

== Ancestry ==
Ancestors of Imperial Noble Consort Quehui

Yangzhen (养真)
Tulai (图赖)
Guowei (国维)
Lady Gioro
Imperial Noble Consort Quehui
Lady Hešeri

== Titles ==
- During the reign of the Kangxi Emperor (r. 1661–1722):
  - Lady Tong (from September/October 1668)
  - Noble Consort (貴妃; from January/February 1701), third rank consort
- During the reign of the Yongzheng Emperor (r. 1722–1735):
  - Dowager Imperial Noble Consort (皇貴妃; from July/August 1724), second rank consort
- During the reign of the Qianlong Emperor (r. 1735–1796):
  - Grand Dowager Imperial Noble Consort Shouqi (壽祺皇貴妃; from December 1736)
  - Imperial Noble Consort Quehui (愨惠皇貴妃; from June/July 1743)

== See also ==
- Ranks of imperial consorts in China#Qing
- Royal and noble ranks of the Qing dynasty
