= Baotai =

Baotai 保泰
- Prince Yu of the First Rank 裕親王

Prince Yu of the First Rank
- Reign: 1703–1724
- Predecessor: Fuquan
- Successor: Guangshan
- Born: 13 May 1682
- Died: 29 September 1730 (aged 48)
- Consorts: Lady Menggiya; Lady Guwalgiya; Lady Šumuru
- Issue: 25 sons
Names
- Aisin Gioro Baotai (愛新覺羅 保泰)
Posthumous name
- Prince Yuxian of the First Rank (裕憲親王)
- House: Aisin Gioro
- Father: Fuquan, Prince Yu
- Mother: Primary consort, of the Siluk clan
- Religion: Buddhism, converts on his qing dynasty's special throne Confucianism

Baotai
- Chinese: 保泰
Transcriptions
Standard Mandarin
- Hanyu Pinyin: Bǎotài

Baotai (保泰; 13 May 1682 – 29 September 1730), formally known as Prince Yu of the First Rank (裕親王), was a Manchu prince of the Qing Dynasty. He was the son of Fuquan and the grandson of Emperor Shunzhi.

== Family ==
=== Primary Consorts ===
- Primary Consort, of the Menggiya clan (嫡妻孟佳氏)
  - Guangshan (广善, 20 August 1697 – 22 October 1745), Heir Son (世子), first son
  - Guang' en (广恩, 27 October 1699 – 24 June 1739), second son
  - Guanghua (广华, 16 October 1704 – 1741, Duke of the Second Rank (奉恩輔國公), third son
- Second Primary Consort, of the Gūwalgiya clan (繼妻瓜爾佳氏)
  - Guangyu (广裕, 14 June 1708 – 1735), fifth son
  - Guanghui (广惠, 4 June 1709 – 1712), seventh son
  - Guangguo (广果, 1710 – 28 February 1712), eighth son
  - Guangnian (广年, 20 December 1713 – 1774), twelfth son
- Third Primary Consort, of the Šumuru clan (三娶妻舒穆祿氏)

=== Mistresses ===
- Mistress, of the Wu clan (妾吳氏)
- Mistress, of the Šumuru clan (妾舒穆祿氏)
  - Guangxiu (广秀, 27 March 1710 – 1712), tenth son
  - Guangqing (广卿, 1713 – 15 Mai 1714), eleventh son
  - Guangyuan (广缘, 14 September 1714 – 1720), thirteenth son
  - Guangchen (广臣, 17 October 1718– 1719), fifteenth son
  - Guangsheng (广升, 1720 – 26 May 1741), sixteenth son
  - Guanghan (广汉, 11 April 1723 – 26 March 1725), eighteenth son
- Mistress, of the Liu clan (妾劉氏)
  - Guangying (广英, 1720 – 1767, Third Class Imperial Guard (三等侍卫), seventeenth son
- Mistress, of the Tian clan (妾田氏)
  - Guanggui (广贵, 15 May 1705 – 29 July 1750), Third Class Imperial Guard (三等侍卫), fourth son
  - Guangyi (广义, 16 February 1709 – 1711), sixth son
- Mistress, of the Gūwalgiya clan (妾瓜爾佳氏)
  - Guangqing (广清, 1710–13 February 1711), ninth son
- Mistress, of the Zhu clan (妾朱氏)
- Mistress, of the Xiang clan (妾項氏)
  - Guangyun (广云, 17 October 1715—1756), fourteenth son
  - Guangkun (广坤, 14 March 1724 – 18 June 1786), Imperial Guard (侍衛), nineteenth son
  - Guangxian (广先, 1725–1727), twentieth son
  - Guangji (广吉, 14 June 1727 – 1774), twenty–second son
  - Guangqiu (广求, 11 October 1728 – 1729), twenty–fourth son
- Mistress, of the Guo clan (妾郭氏)
  - Guangchun (广春, 22 August 1725 – 1731), twenty–first son
- Mistress, of the Shi clan (妾施氏)
  - Guangzhao (广照, 14 April 1728 – 23 Match 1729), twenty–third son
  - Guangrui (广瑞, 1730 – 1736), twenty-fifth son
- Mistress, of the Jiang clan (妾姜氏)
- Mistress, of the Wang clan (妾王氏)
- Mistress, of the Li clan (妾李氏)
- Mistress, of the Tian clan (妾田氏)
