= Imperial Noble Consort Jingmin =

Chinese imperial consort

Imperial Noble Consort Jingmin 敬敏皇貴妃
- Died: 20 August 1699 康熙三十八年七月二十五日; Forbidden City, Beijing, Qing dynasty
- Burial: Jing Mausoleum, Eastern Qing tombs
- Spouse: Kangxi Emperor
- Issue: Yinxiang; Princess Wenke of the Second Rank (和碩溫恪公主); Princess Dunke of the Second Rank (和碩敦恪公主)
Posthumous name
- Imperial Noble Consort Jingmin (敬敏皇貴妃)
- House: Janggiya (章佳; by birth); Aisin-Gioro (by marriage)
- Father: Haikuan (海寬)

Imperial Noble Consort Jingmin (Chinese: 敬敏皇貴妃; ? – 20 August 1699), of the Manchu Bordered White Banner Janggiya clan, was a concubine of the Kangxi Emperor of China's Qing dynasty.

== Life ==
=== Family background ===
Imperial Noble Consort Jingmin's personal name was not recorded in history. Her family belong to the Bordered White Banner.

- Father: Haikuan (海寬), served as military commander

=== Kangxi Era ===
It is unclear when Imperial Noble Consort Jingmin was born or when she entered the palace. But on the first day of October in the twenty-fifth year of Kangxi (1686), she gave birth to the thirteenth prince Yinxiang. On November 27 in the twenty-sixth year of Kangxi, she gave birth to Princess Wenke of the Second Rank (和碩溫恪公主). And on the thirtieth year of Kangxi, she gave birth to her last child, Princess Dunke of the Second Rank (和碩敦恪公主).

In the thirty-eighth year of Kangxi, Concubine Min died in Wulong Pavilion in Beihai. In July of that year, the Kangxi Emperor instructed the Minister of Rites to promote Concubine Min to Consort Min (敏妃) posthumously. In September of the same year, Kangxi's third son Yunzhi was demoted to beile for not attending the funeral for Consort Min.

Records show that Consort Min died during the thirty-eighth year of Kangxi and was temporarily buried in the gazed flower gate in the Emperor's mausoleum. The reason for this arrangement is unknown.

On the twenty-sixth of the first month of the first year of Yongzheng, the Yongzheng Emperor instructed the Ministry of Rites to posthumously upgrade Consort Min's title to Sovereign Father's Imperial Noble Consort (皇考皇贵妃), and on June 20, her formal posthumous title became Imperial Noble Consort Jingmin (敬敏皇贵妃). On the first day of September, Imperial Noble Consort Jingmin along with the Kangxi Emperor and Empress Xiaogongren were buried in the Jing Mausoleum in Zunhua City, Hebei Province.

== Titles ==
- During the reign of the Shunzhi Emperor (r. 1643–1661) or the Kangxi Emperor (r. 1661–1722):
  - Lady Janggiya (章佳氏)
- During the reign of the Kangxi Emperor (r. 1661–1722):
  - Concubine Min (敏嬪; from 1689), fifth rank imperial consort
  - Consort Min (敏妃; from 1699)
- During the reign of the Yongzheng Emperor (r. 1722–1735):
  - Sovereign Father's Imperial Noble Consort (皇考皇贵妃; from 26 January 1723)
  - Imperial Noble Consort Jingmin (敬敏皇贵妃; from 30 June 1723)

== Issues ==
- As Mistress:
  - Yinxiang, Prince Yixian of the First Rank (怡賢親王 胤祥; 16 November 1686 – 18 June 1730), the Kangxi Emperor's 22nd (13th) son
  - Princess Wenke of the Second Rank (和碩溫恪公主; 31 December 1687 – 27 July 1709), the Kangxi Emperor's 13th daughter
- As Concubine Min:
  - Princess Dunke of the Second Rank (和碩敦恪公主; 3 February 1691 – 2 January 1710), the Kangxi Emperor's 15th daughter

== In popular culture ==
- Played by Huang Shengyi in the 2013 series The Palace
- Played by Yang Rong and Sun Yaoqi in the 2013 series I am a mad man
