= Longkodo =

Chinese manchu politician

Minister of Personnel
- In office 27 December 1722 – 1726
- Preceded by: Funingga
- Succeeded by: Sunju

Personal details
- Died: 1728
- Relations: Tong Guowei (father); Qingfu (brother); Empress Xiaoyiren (sister); Imperial Noble Consort Quehui (sister)

Longkodo

Chinese name
- Chinese: 隆科多
Transcriptions
Standard Mandarin
- Hanyu Pinyin: Lóngkēduō

Manchu name
- Manchu script: ᠯᠣᠩᡴᠣᡩᠣ
- Romanization: longkodo

Longkodo (Manchu: ᠯᠣᠩᡴᠣᡩᠣ, romanized: longkodo; died 1728) was a Manchu court official who lived in the Qing dynasty. He was from the Tunggiya clan, which was under the Bordered Yellow Banner. His period of fame lasted from the late Kangxi era to the early Yongzheng era, perhaps most famous for delivering the Kangxi Emperor's disputed will.

== Biography ==
Longkodo was the third son of Tong Guowei and the younger brother of the Kangxi Emperor's third Empress Consort, Empress Xiaoyiren. Another sister, held the rank of Guifei ("Noble Consort") in the Kangxi Emperor's harem (third highest rank). Longkodo's father Tong Guowei was in turn the son of Tong Tulai, a noble who belonged to the Han Eight Banners, and maternal grandfather of the Kangxi Emperor through his mother Empress Xiaokangzhang. Longkodo was therefore both the Kangxi Emperor's maternal cousin, as well as his brother-in-law.

In 1688, Longkodo entered the imperial court of the Kangxi Emperor, serving on the Imperial Guard. He then became deputy commander of the Plain Blue Banner in Mongolia. In 1705, Longkodo was found negligent for abuses committed by his subordinates, and dismissed from his positions. He resurfaced again in 1711, becoming the commander of the capital gendarmerie, better known as the Jiumen Tidu (九门提督), which acted as both a police and military force overseeing the imperial capital, Beijing, and its vicinity. In 1720, Longkodo was named the minister in charge of Lifan Yuan by the ailing Kangxi Emperor, overseeing affairs of ethnic-minority border regions.

At the time of the Kangxi Emperor's death in 1722, Longkodo was the only high-level official present at Changchunyuan, where the ailing emperor died. His military power made him an obvious scapegoat in conspiracy theories, and was deeply suspected by the Yongzheng Emperor, who succeeded the Kangxi Emperor. The biggest mystery surrounding Longkodo is the exclusive attention the Kangxi Emperor gave him before his death. His military support ensured a non-violent transfer of power between the Kangxi and Yongzheng emperors. After the Yongzheng Emperor ascended the throne, Longkodo was given a position on the four-person imperial council, and was the President (Shangshu) of the Board of Governance.

Longkodo was later disgraced, charged with a list of 41 crimes, and then forced into house arrest by the Yongzheng Emperor at Changchunyuan. He died after spending about a year in solitary confinement.

== See also ==
- Nian Gengyao
