= Fuquan, Prince Yu =

Qing prince, son of the Shunzhi Emperor

Fuquan
- Prince Yu of the First Rank (和碩裕親王)

Prince Yu of the First Rank
- Reign: 1671–1703
- Predecessor: None
- Successor: Baotai
- Born: 8 September 1653
- Died: 10 August 1703 (aged 49)
- Consorts: Lady Siluk
- Issue: Baotai, Prince Yu of the First Rank; Baoshou, Prince Yudao of the First Rank; Princess of the Third Rank; Princess of the Third Rank
Names
- Aisin Gioro Fuquan (愛新覺羅 福全)
Posthumous name
- Prince Yuxian of the First Rank (裕憲親王)
- House: Aisin Gioro
- Father: Shunzhi Emperor
- Mother: Consort Ningque
- Religion: Buddhism, converts on his Qing dynasty's special throne Confucianism

Fuquan
- Chinese: 福全
Transcriptions
Standard Mandarin
- Hanyu Pinyin: Fúquán

Fuquan (Manchu: ᡶᡠᠴᡳᠣᠸᠠᠨ, Möllendorff: fuciowan, Abkai: fuqiuwan (8 September 1653 – 10 August 1703), formally known as Prince Yu, was a Manchu prince of the Qing dynasty. He was the second son of the Shunzhi Emperor and a half-brother of the Kangxi Emperor.

== Life ==
Fuquan was born in the Manchu Aisin Gioro clan as the second son of the Shunzhi Emperor. His mother was Consort Ningque (寧愨妃) from the Donggo (董鄂) clan. Fuquan was conferred the title of "Prince Yu of the First Rank" (裕親王) on February 6, 1671. In August 1690, the Kangxi Emperor granted Fuquan the title of "Generalissimo Who Pacifies Distant Lands" (撫遠大將軍) and sent him to lead a campaign against Galdan Boshugtu Khan, leader of the Dzungar Khanate. Assisted by the Kangxi Emperor's eldest son Yinzhi, Fuquan took his army north through the Gubeikou pass while his brother Changning led his troops through another pass, planning to converge on Galdan's position. Fuquan met and attacked Galdan at Ulan Butung (350 kilometers north of Beijing) on September 3, 1690. Galdan's troops protected themselves from Qing artillery by hiding behind rows of camels and by finding refuge in a nearby forest. Although Galdan suffered losses, the battle was a standstill, yet Fuquan reported it as a victory. He returned to the capital on December 22. The Qing commanders who let Galdan escape were punished. Fuquan himself was stripped of his military post and dismissed from the council of princes and high officials. He then retired from political life and later spent most of his time in literary circles.

== Family ==
Primary Consort

- Primary consort, of the Siluk clan (嫡福晉 西魯克氏)
  - First daughter (7 March 1671 – October/November 1675)
  - Changquan (昌全; 16 January 1676 – 27 May 1677), first son
  - Third daughter (26 October 1680 – January/February 1683)

Secondary Consort

- Secondary consort, of the Gūwalgiya clan (側福晉 瓜爾佳氏)
  - Fourth daughter (1 March 1681 – December 1682 or January 1683)
  - Baotai, Prince Yu of the First Rank (裕親王 保泰; 13 May 1682 – 29 September 1730), third son
  - Baoshou, Prince Yudao of the First Rank (裕悼親王 保綬; 27 August 1684 – 14 October 1706), fifth son

Concubine

- Mistress, of the Fuca clan (富察氏)
  - Zhansheng (詹升; 16 August 1678 – 14 January 1681), second son
- Mistress, of the Suo'ertuo clan (索爾托氏)
  - Second daughter (9 September 1680 – March/April 1683)
- Mistress, of the Tusaili clan (圖塞禮氏)
  - Bao'an (保安; 14 November 1683 – 14 May 1686), fourth son
- Mistress, of the Nara clan (格格 那拉氏)
  - Princess of the Third Rank (郡主; 9 June 1700 – 29 December 1733), fifth daughter
    - Married Luobocanggunbu (羅蔔藏袞布; d. 1752) of the Khorchin Borjigit clan in November/December 1713
  - Princess of the Third Rank (郡主; 18 September 1701 – 22 July 1732), sixth daughter
    - Married Cangjin (蒼津) of the Onnigud Borjigit clan in October/November 1716
  - Seventh daughter (2 March 1703 – April/May 1704)
- Mistress, of the Yang clan (楊氏)
  - Baoyong (寶永; 20 July 1701 – 28 September 1705), sixth son

== In fiction and popular culture ==
- Portrayed by Kenneth Ma in The Life and Times of a Sentinel (2011)

== See also ==
- Prince Yu (裕)
- Royal and noble ranks of the Qing dynasty
- Ranks of imperial consorts in China § Qing

== Bibliography ==
- Fang, Chao-ying (1943). "Fu-ch'üan" . In Hummel, Arthur W. Sr. (ed.). Eminent Chinese of the Ch'ing Period. United States Government Printing Office. pp. 251–52.
- Perdue, Peter C. (2005). China Marches West: The Qing Conquest of Central Eurasia. Cambridge, Mass.; London, England: The Belknap Press of Harvard University Press.
- Qingshi gao 清史稿 ["Draft History of the Qing"]. Edited by Zhao Erxun 趙爾巽 et al. Completed in 1927. Citing from 1976-77 edition by Beijing: Zhonghua shuju, in 48 volumes with continuous pagination.
