= Zaiyuan =

- Prince Yi of the First Rank 和碩怡親王

Regent of Qing Dynasty
- Tenure: 22 August – 8 November 1861
- Appointed by: Xianfeng Emperor

Prince Yi of the First Rank
- Tenure: 8 April 1825 – 8 November 1861
- Predecessor: Zaifang (as Prince Yi)
- Successor: Zaitai (as buru bafen fuguo gong)
- Born: 16 October 1816; Beijing
- Died: 8 November 1861 (aged 45); Beijing
- Spouse: Lady Nara; Lady Fang
Names
- Zaiyuan (載垣)
- House: Aisin Gioro
- Father: Yixun
- Mother: Lady Li

Zaiyuan
- Traditional Chinese: 載垣
- Simplified Chinese: 载垣
Transcriptions
Standard Mandarin
- Hanyu Pinyin: Zǎiyuán
- Wade–Giles: Tsai-yüan

Prince Yi
- Traditional Chinese: 怡親王
- Simplified Chinese: 怡亲王
Transcriptions
Standard Mandarin
- Hanyu Pinyin: Yí Qīnwáng
- Wade–Giles: I Chin-wang

Zaiyuan (16 October 1816 – 8 November 1861), formally known as Prince Yi, was a Manchu prince of the Qing dynasty. He was one of the eight regents appointed by the Xianfeng Emperor to assist his successor, the Tongzhi Emperor.

== Life ==
Zaiyuan was born in the Aisin Gioro clan as a descendant of Yinxiang (1686–1730), the 13th son of the Kangxi Emperor. He inherited his ancestors' peerage, "Prince Yi of the First Rank", in 1852 during the reign of the Daoguang Emperor (r. 1820–50).

Zaiyuan took up important positions during the reign of the Xianfeng Emperor (r. 1850–61), including a minister in the Imperial Clan Court and an imperial guard commander. In 1860, during the Second Opium War, Zaiyuan and Muyin (穆蔭) travelled to Tongzhou to replace Guiliang (桂良) in the peace negotiations with British and French officials. When the negotiations failed, the Mongol general Sengge Rinchen took members of the British delegation, including Harry Smith Parkes, Henry Loch, Thomas William Bowlby (a journalist for The Times), and their escorts hostage. The majority of the group – except the two diplomats – died from torture or disease; the survivors were released later. In the meantime, Anglo-French expeditionary forces closed in on Beijing. On 18 October, in retaliation for the capture and deaths of the peace delegation, British and French forces sacked and burnt the Old Summer Palace. Zaiyuan had already fled with the Xianfeng Emperor to the Chengde Mountain Resort in Hebei. Prince Gong, who was ordered to remain behind to make peace with the invaders, successfully concluded the Convention of Beijing with British, French and Russian officials.

Before the Xianfeng Emperor died in 1861, he appointed Zaiyuan, Sushun, Duanhua and five others as regents to assist his son, who succeeded him as the Tongzhi Emperor (r. 1861–75). Later that year, Prince Gong, with support from the Empress Dowagers Ci'an and Cixi, launched the Xinyou Coup and seized power from the eight regents. Zaiyuan was arrested, imprisoned, and given a piece of white silk cloth to commit suicide by hanging himself with the cloth. After Zaiyuan's death, the Prince Yi peerage was inherited by Zaidun (載敦), one of his distant relatives.

== Family ==
Primary Consort

- Primary Consort, of the Nara clan (嫡福晋那拉氏)
  - Princess of the Third Rank (郡主; b. 18 May 1838), first daughter
    - married Boyanamohu of the Khorchin Borjigit clan in 1852
  - Second Daughter (19 July 1839 - 1840)
  - Third Daughter (b.25 May 1843)
    - married Darma of the Borjigin clan in 1863

Secondary Consort

- Secondary Consort, of the Fanggiya clan (侧福晋方佳氏)
  - Fourth Daughter
    - married Xilingga of the Ulanghai clan in 1867
  - Fifth Daughter (b.20 May 1853)
  - Sixth Daughter (b.10 July 1854 )
    - married Nolasang Wangbu of the Ulanghai clan in 1874

== See also ==
- Prince Yi (怡)
- Royal and noble ranks of the Qing dynasty
- Ranks of imperial consorts in China § Qing
