= Hongjiao =

Qing dynasty imperial prince

- Prince Ning of the Second Rank 多羅寧郡王

Head of the House of Prince Ning peerage
- Tenure: 1730–1764
- Predecessor: peerage created
- Successor: Yongfu
- Born: 17 June 1713
- Died: 9 September 1764 (aged 51)
Posthumous name
- Prince Ningliang of the Second Rank (寧良郡王)
- House: Aisin Gioro
- Father: Yinxiang
- Mother: Lady Joogiya

Hongjiao (Chinese: 弘晈; 17 June 1713 – 9 September 1764) was Qing dynasty imperial prince as the fourth son of Yinxiang, Prince Yixian of the First Rank and Kangxi Emperor's grandson. In 1730, he was granted a title of Prince Ning of the Second Rank. As the title was not granted iron-cap status, each successive bearer would hold diminished ranks vis-a-vis his predecessor.

== Life ==
Hongjiao was born on 17 June 1713 to lady Joogiya, primary princess consort Yixian of the First Rank. In 1730, Hongjiao was granted a title of Prince Ning of the Second Rank. He had 2 biological sisters, including Princess Hehui of the Second Rank who was adopted into the palace since young, and 2 surviving biological brothers, including Hongxiao, Prince Yixi of the First Rank. In 1739, Hongjiao formed a fraction together with Prince Li Hongxi, Hongsheng (son of Prince Heng Yunqi), Hongchang and Yunlu (prince Zhuang of the First Rank) aimed to oust Qianlong Emperor from power and set Hongxi as an emperor. The fraction failed to achieve its aim as Hongpu dispatched a messenger to report an urgent secret matter to the Emperor who stayed in Rehe at that time. Hongpu was arrested and demoted to grace defender duke after the imperial hunt. Hongxi and Hongsheng were stripped of their titles and imprisoned while Hongjiao received lighter punishment. Some sources state that he was only deprived of his allowance.

In 1749, Hongjiao was ordered to make sacrifices in the Jing'anzhuang (静安庄). In 1750 and in 1760, Hongjiao was sent to make sacrifices at the Temple of Heaven. In 1752, Hongjiao was stripped of his position in the Ministry of Revenue due to several delicts.

Hongjiao was a poet. His works included "Stories of Chrysantemums" and "Series of the Prosperous Dynasty" in 13 volumes.

Hongjiao died on 9 September 1764 and was posthumously honoured as Prince Ningliang of the Second Rank (宁良郡王, meaning "tranquil and gentle"). He was succeeded by the second son, Yongfu.

== Former residence ==
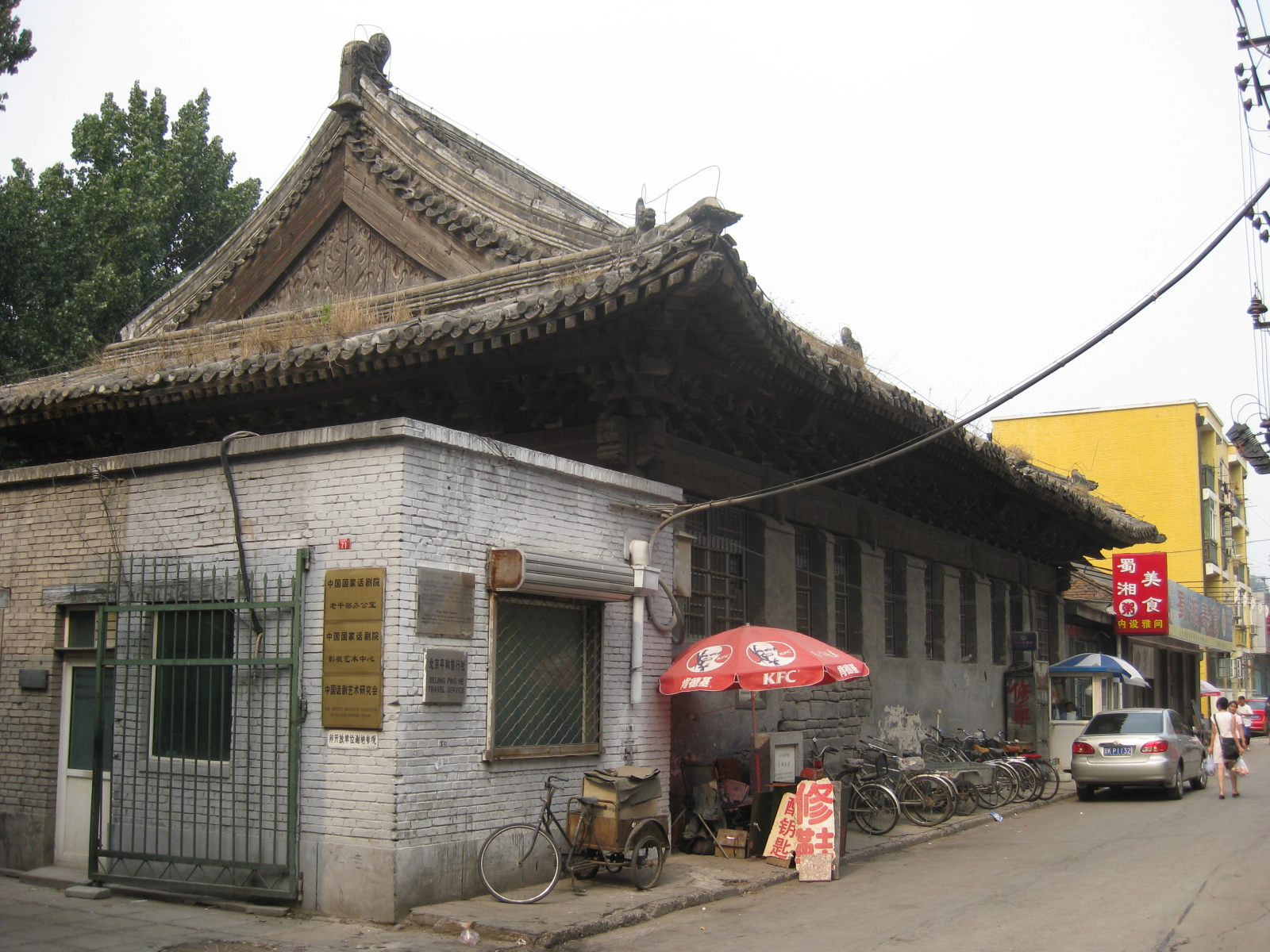
Mansion of Hongjiao and his descendants nowadays

Hongjiao's former residence was called "Little Prince Yi Manor" as one of his descendants, Zaidun, was transferred into Prince Yi of the First Rank peerage. The mansion was built in 1730 in Dongcheng District of Beijing. The residence is not preserved in the Siheyuan style due to modern-day reconstructions. After the Xinhai revolution, the opera stage, stables and outer courtyard were converted into storehouses. During the Qianlong era, the prince Ning manor was described as one of the most luxurious and beautiful princely manors in Beijing.

== Family ==
Hongjiao was married to lady Sirin Gioro, daughter of secretary Zhuolintai (卓林泰). Later, he married lady Ula Nara, daughter of Grand Secretary of the Wenhua hall Chalang'a. As Ula Nara clan was made extinct in 1703, official Qing dynasty records write the name of the clan as "Nara".

- Primary consort, of the Sirin Gioro clan
  - Prince of the Third Rank Yongxi, first son
- Second primary consort, of the Ulanara clan
- Mistress, of the Ding clan
  - Prince Gongke of the Third Rank Yongfu, Prince Yi of the First Rank
