= Prince Yi (created 1722) =

Prince Yi of the First Rank
- Traditional Chinese: 和碩怡親王
- Simplified Chinese: 和硕怡亲王
Transcriptions
Standard Mandarin
- Hanyu Pinyin: héshuò yí qīnwáng
- Wade–Giles: ho-shuo i ch'in-wang

Prince Yi of the First Rank (Manchu: ᡥᠣᡧᠣᡳ
ᡠᡵᡤᡠᠨ
ᠴᡳᠨ ᠸᠠᠩ; hošoi urgun cin wang), or simply Prince Yi, was the title of a princely peerage used in China during the Manchu-led Qing dynasty (1644–1912). It was also one of the 12 "iron-cap" princely peerages in the Qing dynasty, which meant that the title could be passed down without being downgraded.

The first bearer of the title was Yinxiang (1686–1730), the 13th son of the Kangxi Emperor. He was awarded the title by his fourth brother, the Yongzheng Emperor, who succeeded their father. The title was passed down over seven generations, with a brief interruption in 1861. Zaiyuan (1816–1861), the sixth Prince Yi, was ousted from power in the Xinyou Coup of 1861 and forced to commit suicide. Three years later, Zaiyuan's cousin, Zaidun (1827–1890), became the seventh Prince Yi. The title was then passed down for another two generations to Yuqi (1900–1948) before it was finally abolished after the fall of the Qing dynasty.

== Members of the Prince Yi peerage ==
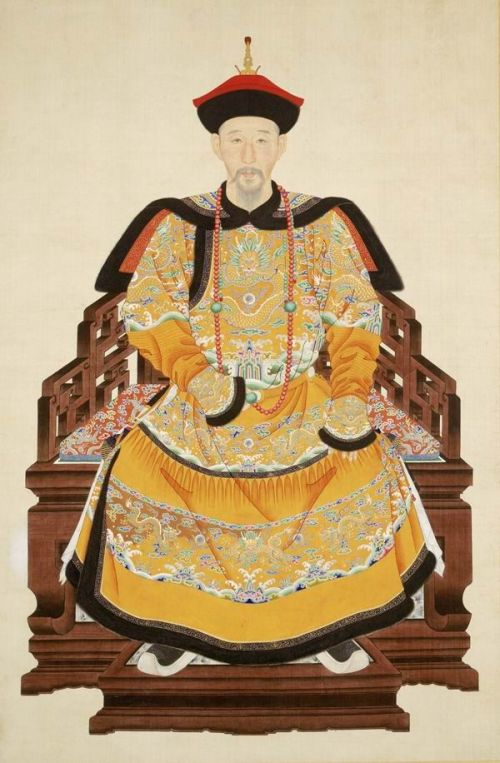
Yinxiang (1686–1730), the first Prince Yi

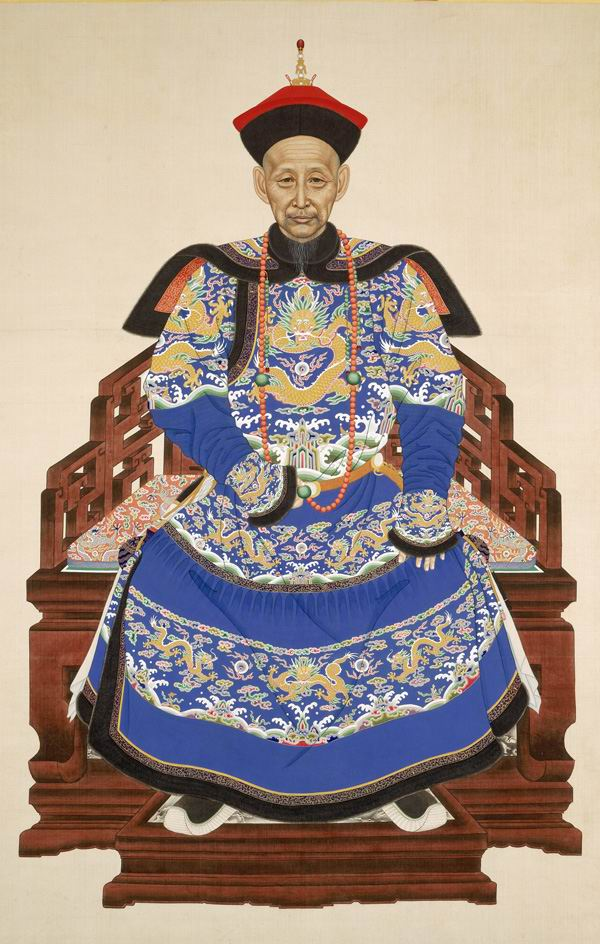
Zaidun (1827–1890), the seventh Prince Yi

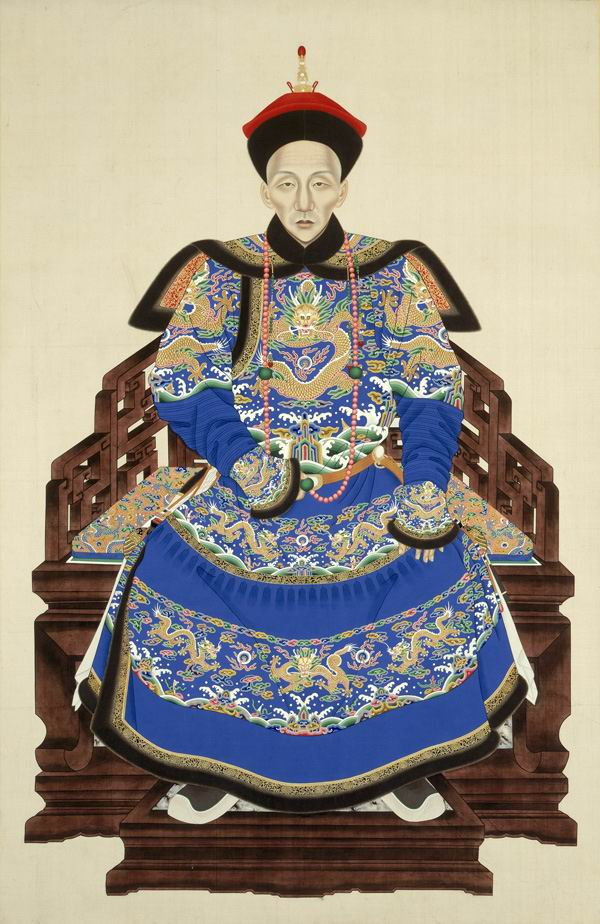
Pujing, the eighth Prince Yi

- Yinxiang (1686–1730), the Kangxi Emperor's 13th son, held the title Prince Yi of the First Rank from 1722 to 1730, posthumously honoured as Prince Yixian of the First Rank (怡賢親王)
  - Hongxiao (弘曉; 1722–1778), Yinxiang's seventh son, held the title Prince Yi of the First Rank from 1730 to 1778, posthumously honoured as Prince Yixi of the First Rank (怡僖親王)
    - Yonglang (永琅; 1746–1799), Hongxiao's second son, held the title of a third class zhenguo jiangjun from 1765 to 1779, held the title Prince Yi of the First Rank from 1779 to 1799, posthumously honoured as Prince Yigong of the First Rank (怡恭親王)
      - Mianbiao (綿標; 1770–1799), Yonglang's second son, held the title of a buru bafen fuguo gong from 1790 to 1799, posthumously awarded the title Prince Yi of the First Rank in 1800
        - Yixun (奕勳; 1793–1818), Mianbiao's eldest son, held the title of a third class zhenguo jiangjun in 1799, held the title Prince Yi of the First Rank from 1799 to 1818, posthumously honoured as Prince Yike of the First Rank (怡恪親王)
          - Zaifang (載坊; 1816–1821), Yixun's eldest son, held the title Prince Yi of the First Rank from 1819 to 1821, had no male heir
          - Zaiyuan (1816–1861), Yixun's second son, held the title Prince Yi of the First Rank from 1825 to 1861, stripped of his title and forced to commit suicide in 1861
          - Zaiping (載坪), Yixun's third son, held the title of a third class fuguo jiangjun from 1836 to 1841, had no male heir
          - Zaiqi (載圻), Yixun's fourth son, held the title of a third class fuguo jiangjun from 1836 to 1869
            - Pulun (溥綸), Zaiqi's second son, held the title of a fengguo jiangjun from 1870 to 1872, had no male heir
          - Zaizeng (載增), Yixun's fifth son, held the title of a third class fuguo jiangjun from 1836 to 1859
            - Puying (溥瑛), Zaizeng's eldest son, held the title of a third class fuguo jiangjun from 1859 to 1891
              - Yujun (毓寯), Puying's second son, held the title of a feng'en jiangjun from 1891 to 1905, had no male heir
          - Zaikun (載堃), Yixun's sixth son, held the title of a third class fuguo jiangjun from 1838 to 1853, had no male heir
          - Zaikan (載堪), Yixun's seventh son, held the title of a third class fuguo jiangjun from 1838 to 1861
            - Puyi (溥義), Zaikan's eldest son, held the title of a fengguo jiangjun from 1861 to 1883
              - Yuxiu (毓秀), Puyi's eldest son, held the title of a feng'en jiangjun from 1883 to 1887, had no male heir
          - Zaitai (載泰; 1838–1878), Yizeng's second son, held the title of a buru bafen fuguo gong from 1862 to 1864, promoted to feng'en fuguo gong in 1864, stripped of his title in 1866
    - Yonghang (永杭), Hongxiao's eldest son, held the title of a third class fuguo jiangjun from 1765 to 1777, had no male heir
    - Yongmai (永邁), Hongxiao's eighth son, held the title of a third class fuguo jiangjun from 1790 to 1799, had no male heir
  - Hongjiao (弘晈; 1713–1764), Yinxiang's fourth son, awarded the title Prince Ning of the Second Rank (寧郡王) in 1730, posthumously honoured as Prince Ningliang of the Second Rank (寧良郡王). The Prince Ning peerage became a separate peerage.
    - Yongfu (永福; 1753–1782), Hongjiao's second son, held the title of a beile from 1764 to 1782, posthumously honoured as "Gongke Beile" (恭恪貝勒) in 1782, posthumously promoted to "Prince Yi of the First Rank" in 1864
      - Mianyu (綿譽; 1780–1843), Yongfu's fourth son, held the title of a beile from 1782 to 1844, posthumously promoted to "Prince Yi of the First Rank" in 1864
      - Yiqu (奕蘧), Mianyu's eldest son, held the title of a second class zhenguo jiangjun from 1821 to 1839, stripped of his title in 1839
        - Yige (奕格; 1805–1858), Mianyu's third son, held the title of a beizi from 1844 to 1858, posthumously promoted to "Prince Yi of the First Rank" in 1864
          - Zaidun (載敦; 1827–1890), Yige's second son, held the title of a third class zhenguo jiangjun from 1857 to 1858, promoted to feng'en zhenguo gong in 1858, inherited the Prince Yi peerage in 1864 and became "Prince Yi of the First Rank", posthumously honoured as Prince Yiduan of the First Rank (怡端親王)
            - Pujing (溥靜; 1849–1900), Zaidun's eldest son, held the title of a buru bafen fuguo gong from 1868 to 1891, held the title Prince Yi of the First Rank from 1891 to 1900, stripped of his title in 1900
            - Puyao (溥耀), Zaidun's second son, held the title of a second class zhenguo jiangjun from 1880 to 1900
              - Yuqi (毓麒; 1900–1948), Puyao's eldest son, held the title Prince Yi of the First Rank from 1902 to 1945
                - Hengshu (恆樞; 1917–1979), Yuqi's son
                  - Qiyun (啟運; b. 1945), Yuqi's grandson
  - Hongchang (弘昌; 1706–1771), Yinxiang's eldest son, held the title of a beizi from 1723 to 1735, promoted to beile in 1735 but had his title revoked in 1739
  - Hongdun (弘暾; 1711–1728), Yinxiang's third son, posthumously awarded a beile title in 1728
    - Yongxi (永喜), Hongdun's heir, held a beile title from 1730 to 1731, had no male heir
  - Hongqin (弘昑; 1716–1729), Yinxiang's sixth son, posthumously awarded a beile title in 1729

== Family tree ==
Yinxiang 胤祥 (1686–1730); Prince Yixian 怡賢親王 (1722–1730)
Hongxiao 弘曉 (1722–1778); Prince Yixi 怡僖親王 (1730–1778)	Hongjiao 弘晈 (1713–1764); Prince Ningliang (of the Second Rank) 寧良郡王
Yonglang 永琅 (1746–1799); Prince Yigong 怡恭親王 (1779–1799)	Yongfu 永福 (1753–1782); Prince Yi 怡親王 (posthumously awarded)
Mianbiao 綿標 (1770–1799); Prince Yi 怡親王 (posthumously awarded)	Mianyu 綿譽; 1780–1843; Prince Yi 怡親王 (posthumously awarded)
Yixun 奕勛 (1793–1818); Prince Yike 怡恪親王 (1799–1818)	Yige 奕格 (1805–1858); Prince Yi 怡親王 (posthumously awarded)
Zaifang 載坊 (1816–1821); Prince Yi 怡親王 (1819–1821)	Zaiyuan 載垣 (1816–1861); Prince Yi 怡親王 (1825–1861) (stripped of his title)	Zaidun 載敦 (1827–1890); Prince Yiduan 怡端親王 (1864–1890)
Pujing 溥靜 (1849–1900); Prince Yi 怡親王 (1891–1900) (stripped of his title)	Puyao 溥耀 (1861–1900); Second Class Zhenguo Jiangjun 二等鎮國將軍
Yuqi 毓麒 (1900–1948); Prince Yi 怡親王 (1902–1945)

== See also ==
- Prince Ning
- Royal and noble ranks of the Qing dynasty
