= Joogiya =

Manchu clan and family name

Chinese name
- Chinese: 兆佳氏
Transcriptions
Standard Mandarin
- Hanyu Pinyin: zhào jiā shì

Manchu name
- Manchu script: ᠵᠣᡠᡤᡳᠶᠠ
- Möllendorff: Joogiya

Pronunciation respelling name
- Pronunciation respelling: ZHAW-ghee-yah

Joogiya is a Manchu clan and family name.

== Notable Figures ==
=== Males ===
- Shusai (舒赛)
- Hetu (赫图)
- Wengguotuo (翁果托)
- Duo'ertai (多尔泰）
- Saikesehe (塞克塞赫), served as third rank military official (参领)

=== Females ===
Imperial Consort

- Noble Lady
  - Noble Lady Bu (d. 1717), the Kangxi Emperor's noble lady, the mother of Princess Duanjing (1674–1710)

Princess Consort

- Primary Consort
  - Yinxiang's primary consort, the mother of Princess (1707–1726), Hongdun (1711–1728), Hongjiao (1713–1764), Princess Hehui (1714–1731), Hongkuang (1716–1722), Hongxiao (1722–1778) and Shou'en (1725–1727)
- Concubine
  - Nurhaci's concubine, the mother of Abai (1585–1648)
