= Prince Ning =

Prince Ning of the Second Rank
- Traditional Chinese: 多羅寧郡王
- Simplified Chinese: 多罗宁郡王
Transcriptions
Standard Mandarin
- Hanyu Pinyin: duōluó níng jùnwáng
- Wade–Giles: to-lo ning chün-wang

Prince Ning of the Second Rank, or simply Prince Ning, was the title of a princely peerage used in China during the Manchu-led Qing dynasty (1644–1912). As the Prince Ning peerage was not awarded "iron-cap" status, this meant that each successive bearer of the title would normally start off with a title downgraded by one rank vis-à-vis that held by his predecessor. However, the title would generally not be downgraded to any lower than a feng'en fuguo gong except under special circumstances.

The first bearer of the title was Hongjiao (弘晈; 1713–1764), the fourth son of Yinxiang and a grandson of the Kangxi Emperor. In 1730, Hongjiao was granted the title "Prince Ning of the Second Rank" by the Yongzheng Emperor. The title was passed down over six generations and held by eight persons.

== Members of the Prince Ning peerage ==
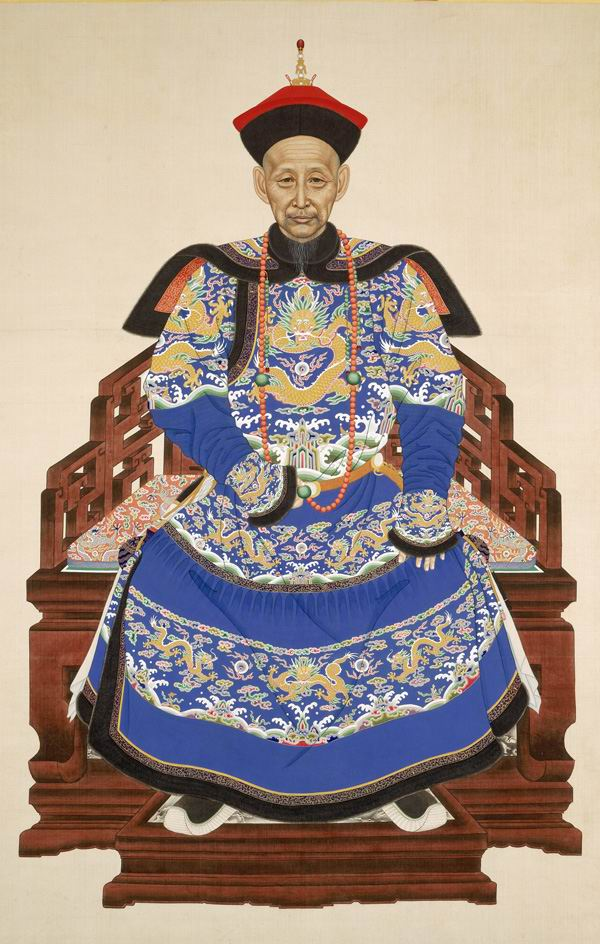
Zaidun (1827–1890), the fifth in line in the Prince Ning peerage before he was transferred to the Prince Yi peerage

- Hongjiao (弘晈; 1713–1764), Yinxiang's fourth son, held the title Prince Ning of the Second Rank from 1730 to 1764, posthumously honoured as Prince Ningliang of the Second Rank (寧良郡王)
  - Yongfu (永福; 1753–1782), Hongjiao's second son, held the title of a beile from 1764 to 1782, posthumously honoured as Gongke Beile (恭恪貝勒) in 1782, posthumously promoted to "Prince Yi of the First Rank" in 1864
    - Mianyu (綿譽; 1780–1844), Yongfu's fourth son, held the title of a beile from 1782 to 1844, posthumously promoted to "Prince Yi of the First Rank" in 1864
      - Yiqu (奕蘧), Mianyu's eldest son, held the title of a second class zhenguo jiangjun from 1821 to 1839, stripped of his title in 1839
      - Yige (奕格; 1805–1858), Mianyu's third son, held the title of a beizi from 1844 to 1858, posthumously promoted to "Prince Yi of the First Rank" in 1864
        - Zaidun (載敦; 1827–1890), Yige's second son, held the title of a third class zhenguo jiangjun from 1857 to 1858, promoted to feng'en zhenguo gong in 1858, inherited the Prince Yi peerage in 1864 and became "Prince Yi of the First Rank", posthumously honoured as "Prince Yiduan of the First Rank" (怡端親王)
        - Zaixi (載熙), Yige's seventh son, held the title of a zhenguo jiangjun from 1857 to 1875
          - Purong (溥榮), Zaixi's eldest son, held the title of a fuguo jiangjun from 1856 to 1894, had no male heir
      - Yilian (奕連), Mianyu's fourth son, held the title of a feng'en jiangjun from 1833 to 1849, had no male heir
      - Yiwu (奕珷), Mianyu's sixth son, held the title of a first class fuguo jiangjun from 1836 to 1883
        - Zaikong (載孔), Yiwu's second son, held the title of a fengguo jiangjun from 1883 to 1901
          - Pukai (溥凱), Zaikong's eldest son, held the title of a feng'en jiangjun from 1902
          - Pucai (溥彩), Zaikong's second son, held the title of a feng'en jiangjun from 1897
      - Yicun (奕存), Mianyu's eighth son, held the title of a feng'en jiangjun from 1862 to 1876
        - Zaishou (載壽), Yicun's eldest son, held the title of a feng'en jiangjun from 1876 to 1890
        - Zaitai (載泰; 1838–1878), Yizeng's second son and Zaidun's successor, held the title of a buru bafen fuguo gong from 1862 to 1864, promoted to feng'en fuguo gong in 1864, stripped of his title in 1866
        - Zaibo (載帛; 1853–1913), Yixie's eldest son and Zaitai's successor, held the title of a feng'en fuguo gong from 1866 to 1913
          - Pulin (溥琳; 1882–1937), Zaibo's eldest son, held the title of a feng'en fuguo gong from 1913 to 1937

== Family tree ==
adoption
Yinxiang 胤祥 (1686–1730); Prince Yixian of the First Rank 怡賢親王 (1722–1730)
Hongchang 弘昌 (1706–1771); Beile 貝勒 (1735–1739) (stripped of his title)	Hongdun 弘暾 (1710–1728); Beile 貝勒 (posthumously awarded)	Hongjiao 弘晈 (1713–1764); Prince Ningliang of the Second Rank 寧良郡王 (1730–1764)	Hongxiao 弘曉 (1722–1778); Prince Yixi of the First Rank 怡僖親王 (1730–1778)
Yongliang 永良 (1759–1803)	Yongfu 永福 (1753–1782); Prince Yi of the First Rank 怡親王 (posthumously awarded)	Yongman 永蔓 (1752–1808)
Mianyu 綿譽 (1780–1844); Prince Yi of the First Rank 怡親王 (posthumously awarded)	Miantang 綿堂 (1778–1850)	Miankui 綿奎 (1783–1852)	Mianchun 綿椿 (1789–1854)	Miankao 綿靠 (1789–1814)
Yige 奕格 (1805–1858); Prince Yi of the First Rank 怡親王 (posthumously awarded)	Yisong 奕菘 (1797–1823)	Yizeng 奕增 (1812–1846)	Yixie 奕協 (1828–1862)
Zaidun 載敦 (1827–1890); Prince Yiduan of the First Rank 怡端親王 (1864–1890)	Zaitai 載泰 (1838–1878); Feng'en Fuguo Gong 奉恩輔國公 (1864–1866) (stripped of his title)	Zaibo 載帛 (1853–1913); Feng'en Fuguo Gong 奉恩輔國公 (1866–1913)
Pulin 溥琳 (1882–1937); Feng'en Fuguo Gong 奉恩輔國公 (1913–1937)

== See also ==
- Prince Yi (怡)
- Royal and noble ranks of the Qing dynasty
