= Empress Xiaoyiren =

Empress of China in 1689

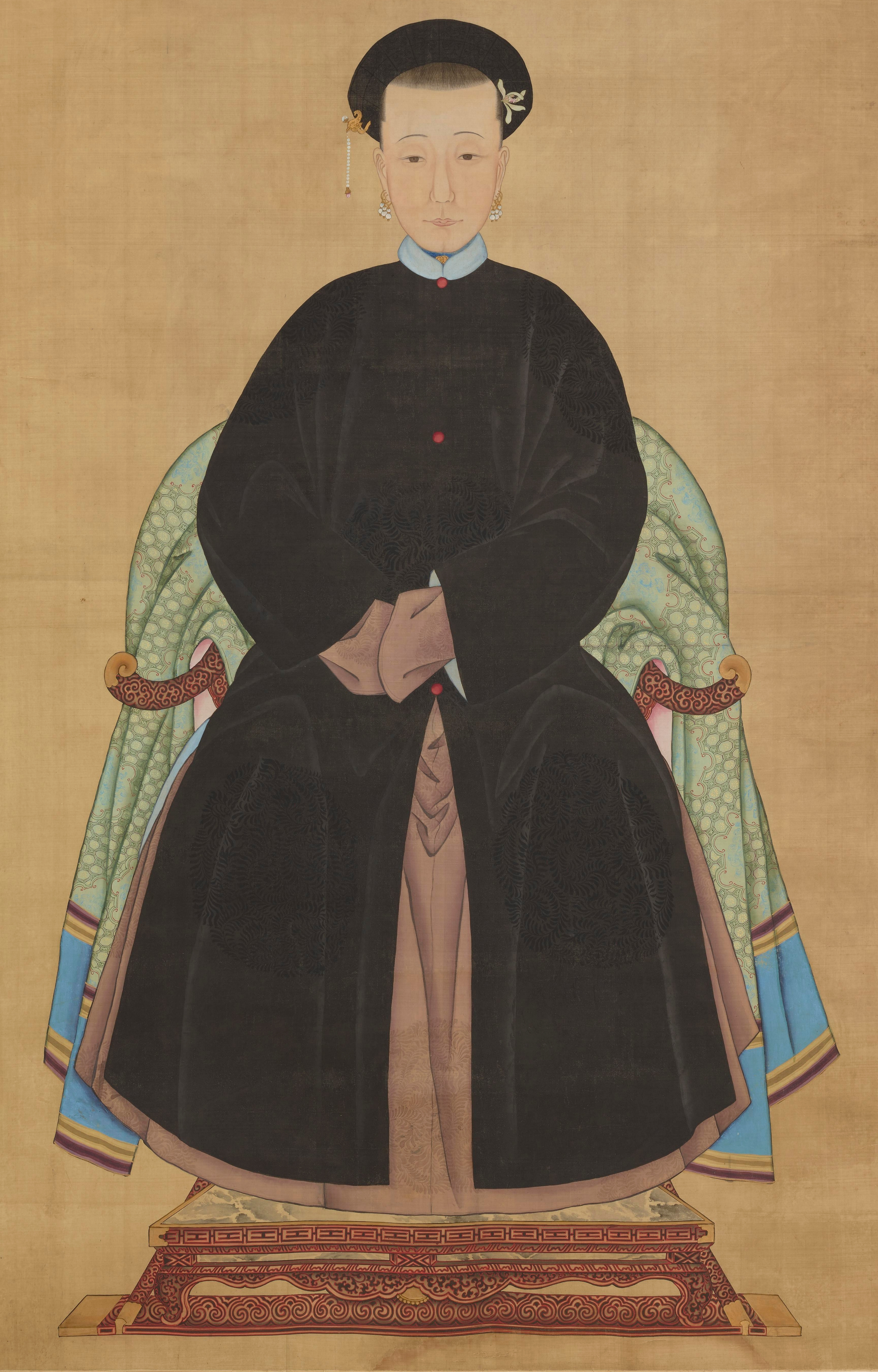
- Qing dynasty portrait of Empress Xiaoyiren

Empress consort of the Qing dynasty
- Tenure: 23 August 1689 – 24 August 1689
- Predecessor: Empress Xiaozhaoren
- Successor: Empress Xiaojingxian
- Born: c.1662
- Died: 24 August 1689 (康熙二十八年 七月 十日); Chengqian Palace, Forbidden City, Beijing, Qing China
- Burial: Jing Mausoleum, Eastern Qing tombs
- Spouse: Kangxi Emperor (before 1689)
- Issue: Eighth daughter
Posthumous name
- Empress Xiaoyi Wencheng Duanren Xianmu Heke Cihui Fengtian Zuosheng Ren (孝懿溫誠端仁憲穆和恪慈惠奉天佐聖仁皇后)
- House: Tong, later Tunggiya (佟佳)
- Father: Guowei
- Mother: Lady Hešeri

Empress Xiaoyiren

Chinese name
- Traditional Chinese: 孝懿仁皇后
- Simplified Chinese: 孝懿仁皇后
Transcriptions
Standard Mandarin
- Hanyu Pinyin: Xiàoyìrén Huánghòu

Manchu name
- Manchu script: ᡥᡳᠶᠣᠣᡧᡠᠩᡤᠠ ᡶᡠᠵᡠᡵᡠᠩᡤᠠ ᡤᠣᠰᡳᠨ ᡥᡡᠸᠠᠩᡥᡝᠣ
- Romanization: hiyoošungga fujurungga gosin hūwangheo

Empress Xiaoyiren (died 24 August 1689), of the Manchu Bordered Yellow Banner Tunggiya clan, was the third empress consort of the Kangxi Emperor of China's Qing dynasty. She was made empress consort in 1689 soon before her death.

== Life ==
=== Family background ===
Empress Xiaoyiren's personal name was not recorded in history. Her family originally belonged to the Han Chinese Plain Blue Banner.

- Father: Guowei (國維/国维; d. 1719), served as a leader of imperial guards (領侍衛內大臣/领侍卫内大臣), and held the title of a first class duke (一等公)
  - Paternal grandfather: Tulai (圖賴/图赖; 1606–1658), served as a first rank military official (都統/都统), and held the title of a first class duke (一等公)
  - Paternal grandmother: Lady Gioro
  - Paternal aunt: Empress Xiaokangzhang (1638–1663), the mother of the Kangxi Emperor (1654–1722)
- Mother: Lady Hešeri
- Six brothers
  - First younger brother: Yekeshu (叶克书), father of Shun'anyan
  - Second younger brother: Dekesi (德克新), served as third class imperial guard
  - Third younger brother: Longkodo (d. 1728)
  - Fourth younger brother: Hongshan (洪善)
  - Fifth younger brother: Qingyuan (庆元)
  - Sixth younger brother: Qingfu (庆復; d. 1747), served as first rank military official (都統/都统, pinyin: dutong) from 1727 to 1733, Viceroy of Liangjiang, Viceroy of Yunnan, Viceroy of Liangguang in 1741, a Grand Secretary of Wenhua hall (文华殿大学士)
- Younger sister: Imperial Noble Consort Quehui (1668–1743)

=== Kangxi era ===
Lady Tong first entered the Forbidden City in late 1676 and became a mistress of the Kangxi Emperor and was treated as a consort, but was not officially entitled. She was first mentioned in official histories on 18 September 1677 when the Kangxi Emperor granted ranks and titles to his consorts. She was granted the title "Noble Consort". As she was the only one among the emperor's consorts to hold that rank, she did not receive an honorary name to distinguish her from the other consorts.

On 18 March 1678, the Kangxi Emperor's second empress consort, Empress Xiaozhaoren, died so there was no one to take charge of the emperor's harem. The Noble Consort was put in charge and became the de facto chief of imperial harem. On 13 December 1678, another concubine of the Kangxi Emperor gave birth to a son, Yinzhen. Traditionally, the Empress was tasked with overseeing the upbringing of all the Emperor's children, regardless of whether or not she was their birth mother. Since the Noble Consort was the most senior among all the Kangxi Emperor's consorts at the time, she was tasked with raising Yinzhen.

On 28 January 1682, the Noble Consort was elevated to "Imperial Noble Consort". On 13 July 1683, she gave birth to the emperor's eighth daughter, who would die prematurely on 6 August 1683.

On 23 August 1689, when the Imperial Noble Consort was critically ill, the Kangxi Emperor officially instated her as empress. She died the next day, likely from complications following a miscarriage and was interred in the Jing Mausoleum of the Eastern Qing tombs. She was granted the posthumous title "Empress Xiaoyiren".

== Titles ==
- During the reign of the Shunzhi Emperor (r. 1643–1661) or the Kangxi Emperor (r. 1661–1722):
  - Lady Tong
- During the reign of the Kangxi Emperor (r. 1661–1722):
  - Noble Consort (貴妃; from 18 September 1677), third rank consort
  - Imperial Noble Consort (皇貴妃; from 28 January 1682), second rank consort
  - Empress (皇后; from 23 August 1689)
  - Empress Xiaoyi (孝懿皇后; from 3 November 1689)
- During the reign of the Yongzheng Emperor (r. 1722–1735):
  - Empress Xiaoyiren (孝懿仁皇后; from July 1723)

== Issue ==
- As Imperial Noble Consort:
  - The Kangxi Emperor's eighth daughter (13 July 1683 – 6 August 1683)
  - Miscarriage (August 1689)

== In fiction and popular culture ==
- Portrayed by Ha Chi-chan in The Rise and Fall of Qing Dynasty (1987)
- Portrayed by Zhang Xin in Palace (2011)
- Portrayed by Elaine Yiu in The Life and Times of a Sentinel (2011)

== See also ==
- Ranks of imperial consorts in China#Qing
- Royal and noble ranks of the Qing dynasty

== Notes ==
Empress Xiaoyiren House of Tunggiya
Chinese royalty
Preceded by Empress Xiaozhaoren of the Niohuru clan	Empress consort of China; 23 August 1689 – 24 August 1689	Succeeded by Duoqimuli, Empress Xiaojingxian of the Ula-nara clan
