= Empress Xiaokangzhang =

Qing dynasty empress (1638–1663)

- Empress Dowager Cihe
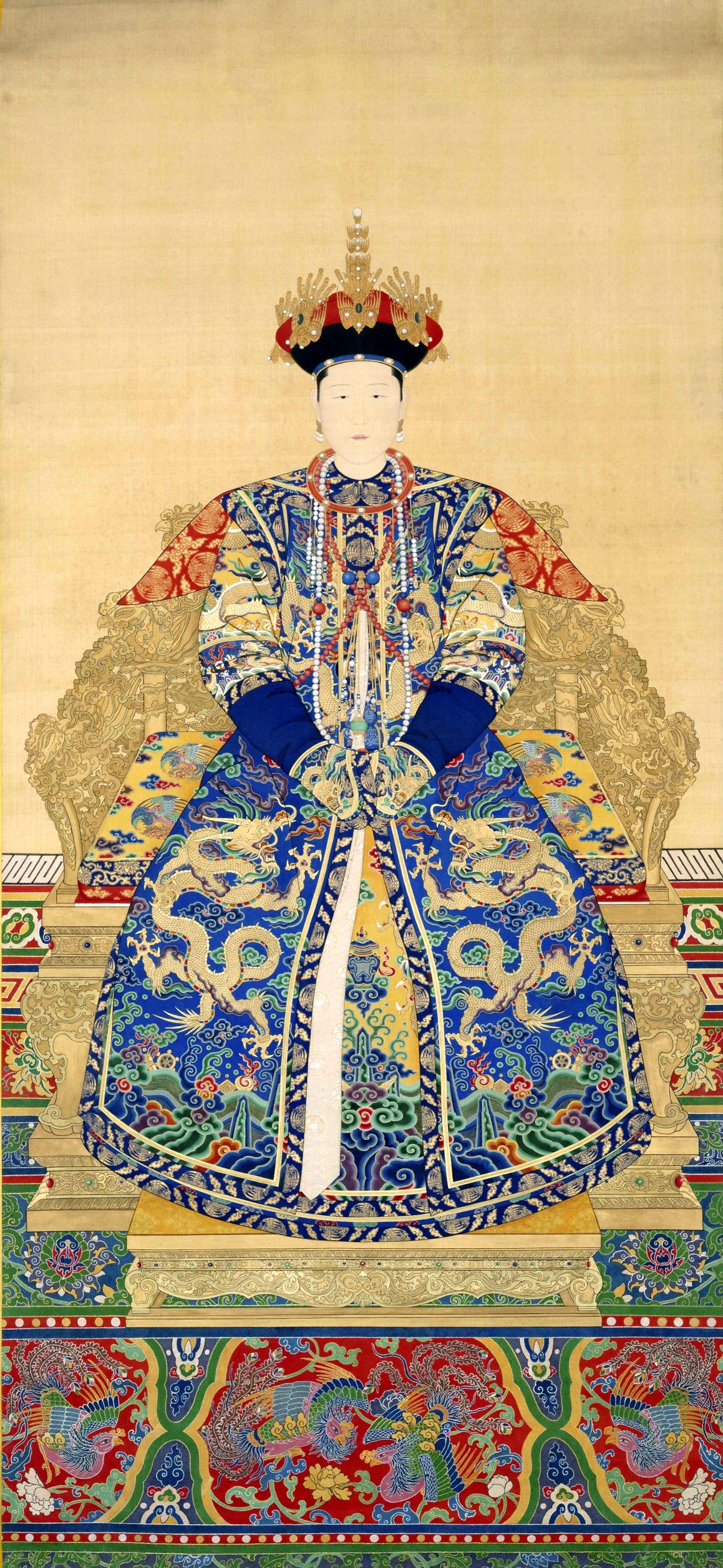
- Qing Dynasty portrait of Empress Xiaokangzhang

Empress dowager of the Qing dynasty
- Tenure: 5 February 1661 – 20 March 1663
- Predecessor: Empress Dowager Zhaosheng
- Successor: Empress Dowager Renxian (as the sole empress dowager)
- Born: 1638 (崇德五年)
- Died: 20 March 1663 (aged 24–25) (康熙二年 二月 十一日); Forbidden City, Beijing
- Burial: Xiao Mausoleum, Eastern Qing tombs
- Spouse: Shunzhi Emperor (m. 1653; died 1661)
- Issue: Kangxi Emperor
Posthumous name
- Empress Xiaokang Cihe Zhuangyi Gonghui Wenmu Duanjing Chongtian Yusheng Zhang (孝康慈和莊懿恭惠溫穆端靖崇天育聖章皇后)
- House: Tong (佟氏), later Tunggiya (佟佳氏; by birth); Aisin-Gioro (by marriage)
- Father: Tulai
- Mother: Lady Gioro

Empress Xiaokangzhang

Chinese name
- Traditional Chinese: 孝康章皇后
- Simplified Chinese: 孝康章皇后
Transcriptions
Standard Mandarin
- Hanyu Pinyin: Xiàokāngzhāng Huánghòu

Manchu name
- Manchu script: ᡥᡳᠶᠣᠣᡧᡠᠩᡤᠠ ᠨᡝᠰᡠᡴᡝᠨ ᡝᠯᡩᡝᠮᠪᡠᡥᡝ ᡥᡡᠸᠠᠩᡥᡝᠣ
- Romanization: hiyoošngga nemgiyen eldembuhe hūwangheo

Empress Xiaokangzhang (1638 – 20 March 1663), of the Manchu Bordered Yellow Banner Tunggiya clan, was the concubine of the Shunzhi Emperor and mother of the Kangxi Emperor during the Qing dynasty. She was honoured as Empress Dowager Cihe during the reign of her son and was posthumously honoured as empress, although she never held the rank during her lifetime.

== Life ==
=== Family background ===
Empress Xiaokangzhang's personal name was not recorded in history. Her family originally belonged to the Han Chinese Plain Blue Banner from Fushun in Liaoning, but managed to reclassify themselves as Manchu.

- Father: Tulai (圖賴; 1606–1658), served as a first rank military official (都統), and held the title of a first class duke (一等公)
  - Paternal grandfather: Yangzhen (養真/养真; ? – 1621)
- Mother: Lady Gioro (覺羅氏)
- Three brothers
  - First younger brother: Guoji (国纪/國紀)
  - Second younger brother: Guogang (国纲/國綱; ? – 1690), served as a first rank military official (都统), and held the title of first class duke (一等公)
  - Third younger brother: Guowei (國維; ? – 1719), served as leader of the Imperial Guards (領侍衛內大臣), and held the title of a first class duke (一等公); the father of Empress Xiaoyiren (? – 1689) and Imperial Noble Consort Quehui (1668–1743)

The Han Chinese Tong (佟) clan of Fushun in Liaoning, from whom Kangxi's mother descends, falsely claimed to be related to the Manchu Tunggiya (佟佳) clan of Jilin, using this false claim to get themselves transferred to a Manchu banner in the reign of the Kangxi Emperor. However the private genealogical records of the Fushun Tong clan actually demonstrate Han ancestry from the Central Plains, contrary to their later claims of Manchu ancestry, later reclassification as Manchu bannerman, and the official Qing records.

=== Shunzhi era ===
In 1653, Lady Tong entered the Forbidden City and became a concubine of the Shunzhi Emperor. She never received any title or rank during his reign. On 4 May 1654, she gave birth to the emperor's third son, Xuanye.

=== Kangxi era ===
When the Shunzhi Emperor died on 5 February 1661, Xuanye was chosen to be the new emperor and was enthroned as the Kangxi Emperor. As the biological mother of the reigning emperor, Lady Tong was honoured as "Holy Mother, Empress Dowager Cihe".

Lady Tong died on 20 March 1663. Her death was reportedly due to an unknown illness but the circumstances surrounding her death were suspicious. Although she had never been empress during the reign of the Shunzhi Emperor, she was granted the posthumous title "Empress Xiaokangzhang". She was interred in the Xiao Mausoleum alongside the Shunzhi Emperor and Consort Donggo.

== Titles ==
- During the reign of Hong Taiji (r. 1626–1643):
  - Lady Tong (佟氏)
- During the reign of the Kangxi Emperor (r. 1661–1722):
  - Empress Dowager Cihe (慈和皇太后; from 5 February 1661)
  - Empress Xiaokang (孝康皇后; from June/July 1663)
  - Empress Xiaokangzhang (孝康章皇后; from June/July 1670)

== Issue ==
- As concubine:
  - Xuanye (玄燁; 4 May 1654 – 20 December 1722), the Shunzhi Emperor's third son; enthroned on 5 February 1661 as the Kangxi Emperor

== In popular culture ==
- Portrayed by Chen Farong in The Duke of Mount Deer (2000)
- Portrayed by Zhu Yan in Kangxi Dynasty (2001)
- Portrayed by Jia Yumeng in Xiaozhuang Mishi (2003)

== See also ==
- Imperial Chinese harem system#Qing
- Royal and noble ranks of the Qing dynasty

== Notes ==
Empress Xiaokangzhang Tunggiya
Chinese royalty
Preceded by Bumbutai, Empress Dowager Zhaosheng (Xiaozhuang) of the Borjigit clan	Empress dowager of China; 5 February 1661 – 20 March 1663 with Alatan Qiqige, Empress Dowager Renxian (Xiaohuizhang)	Succeeded by Alatan Qiqige, Empress Dowager Renxian (Xiaohuizhang) of the Borjigit clan as sole empress dowager
