= Tunggiya =

Manchu clan and family name

Manchu name
- Manchu script: ᡨᡠᠩᡤᡳᠶᠠ

Chinese name
- Traditional Chinese: 佟佳氏
Transcriptions
Standard Mandarin
- Hanyu Pinyin: tóng jiā shì

Pronunciation respelling name
- Pronunciation respelling: TOONG-ghee-yah

Tunggiya is a Manchu and Sibe clan and surname. It is often recorded as one of the Eight Great Manchu Clans in different Qing dynasty documents. According to the Complete Genealogies of the Manchu Clans and Families of the Eight Banners (八旗滿洲氏族通譜), the clan name originated from Tunggiya River, although some sources trace its ancestry to the Giagu (夹古) clan of the Jurchen Jin dynasty. The earliest known ancestor was Bahū Teksin (巴虎特克慎) of Maca area, who lived approximately in the transitioning era between Yuan and Ming dynasty. His descendants spread across other Manchurian regions such as Yarhu, Jaha, Tunggiya, Fola, Jakumu, Hada, and Samjan. By the late Ming period the clan had grown into numerous branches. After joining Nurhaci's service, its clansmen were incorporated into the Eight Banners socio-military system.

During the Qing dynasty, the Tunggiya clan became one of the empire's most influential aristocratic families, earning the nickname Tong Banchao (佟半朝, "Half the Court Officials are the Tongs/Tunggiya"). Through its military achievements, high-ranking officials, and especially its close ties to the imperial family, it played a major role in Qing politics for generations from the beginning to the end. After the fall of the Qing dynasty, most descendants adopted the Sino surname Tong (佟), while others used surnames such as Tong (仝), Tong (同), Tong (童), Dong (董), Gao (高), Zhao (趙), Yu (俞), and Hui (惠).

== Overview ==
=== Baduri family ===
The Baduri family of the Plain White Banner was among the most distinguished Tunggiya families. Baduri joined Nurhaci's earlier campaign with hundreds of followers, gained noble rank to Baron Third Class (三等男爵) through military service and achievements, and became a minister and banner commander. His descendants inherited the title and promoted to count in further campaigns.

=== Hūrhan Family ===
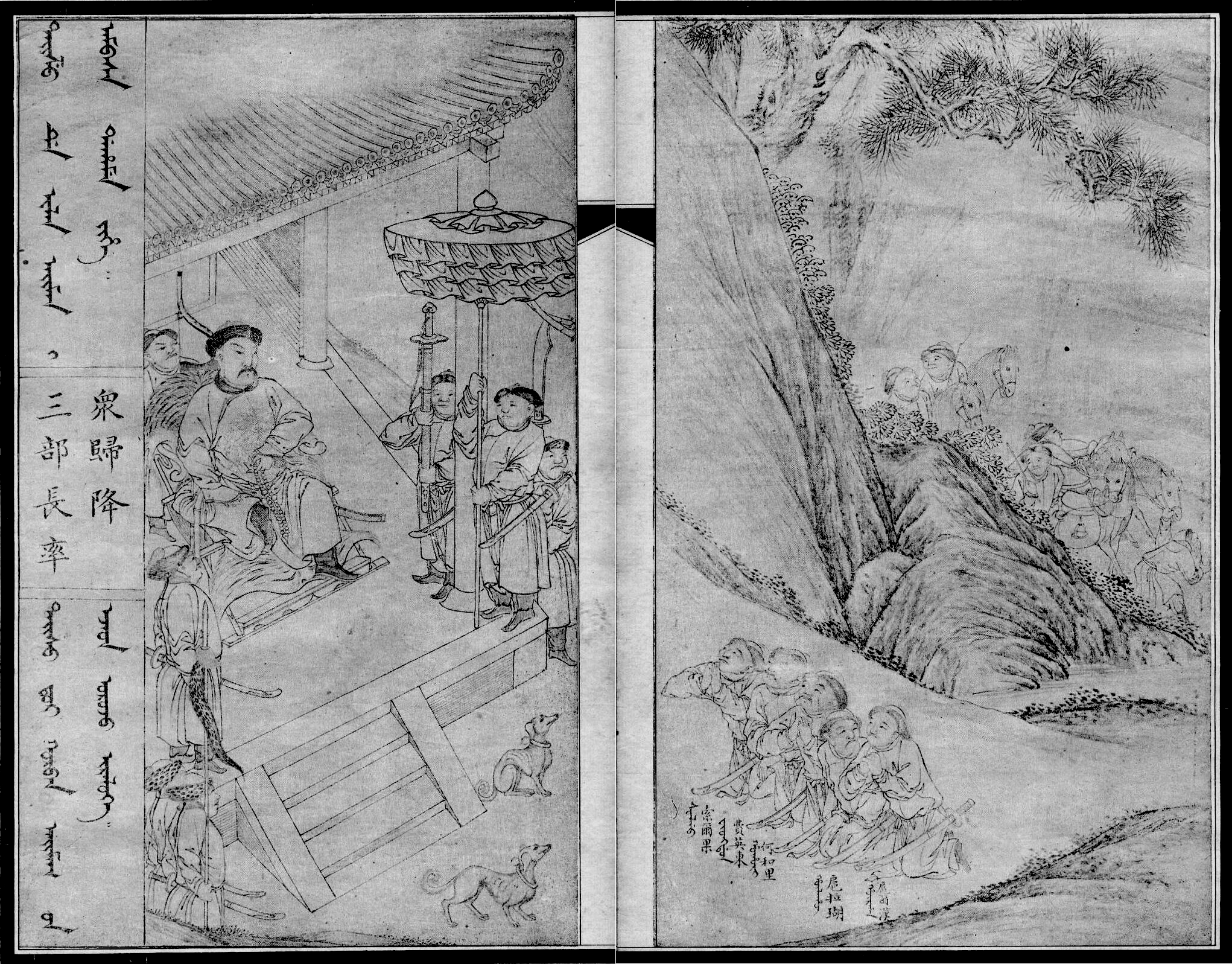
Manchu Veritable Records depicted the submission of Hūlahū (second person kneeling on the right) and Hūrhan (first person on the right)

The Hūrhan family was a prominent family who significantly contributed the founding of the Manchu Khanate. Hūrhan followed the step of his father Hūlahū, the chieftain of Yarhū, who joined Nurhaci's tribal forces in 1588. Hūrhan, then 13 years old, was raised as an adopted son by Nurhaci, granted him the imperial surname Gioro. He later became one of the five founding ministers of the Later Jin (後金開國五大臣). Hūrhan distinguished himself in campaigns as a major Banner army commander against troops of other Jurchen tribes, Ming, Mongols, and various enemies, particularly defeating Liu Ting (劉綎) and Gang Hong-rip's Ming-Joseon combined forces at the Battle of Sarhū. His descendants inherited noble titles such as Viscounts, Baron and served high military positions.

=== Tong Yangzhen family ===
The Tong Yangzhen (佟养真) family and his clansmen, originally from Tunggiya, was the most politically influential branch in Qing dynasty. The notable people include Kangxi emperor's mother Empress Xiaokangzhang along with his uncles Tong Guogang, Tong Guowei; cousin Longkodo who all served key positions in the Grand Secretariat and the Six Ministries. Their close marital ties with the imperial house gave the clan enormous political influence during the reigns of the Kangxi and Yongzheng emperors. Multiple members held the noble titles of duke, earl, or baron and served as Grand Secretary or Grand Council members, ministers, viceroys, Banner army commanders, and other high-ranking officials.

=== Others ===
Numerous other Tunggiya families, who lived in Jaha, Changbai Mountain, Hada, Zakumu, Samjan, and other regions, earned minor hereditary titles such as Qiduwei (騎都尉, Knight Commandant) or Yunqiwei (雲騎尉, Cloud Calvary Commandant) through service in the conquest of China, the suppression of the Southern Ming and the Revolt of the Three Feudatories, and campaigns against the Zunghars.

== Gallery ==
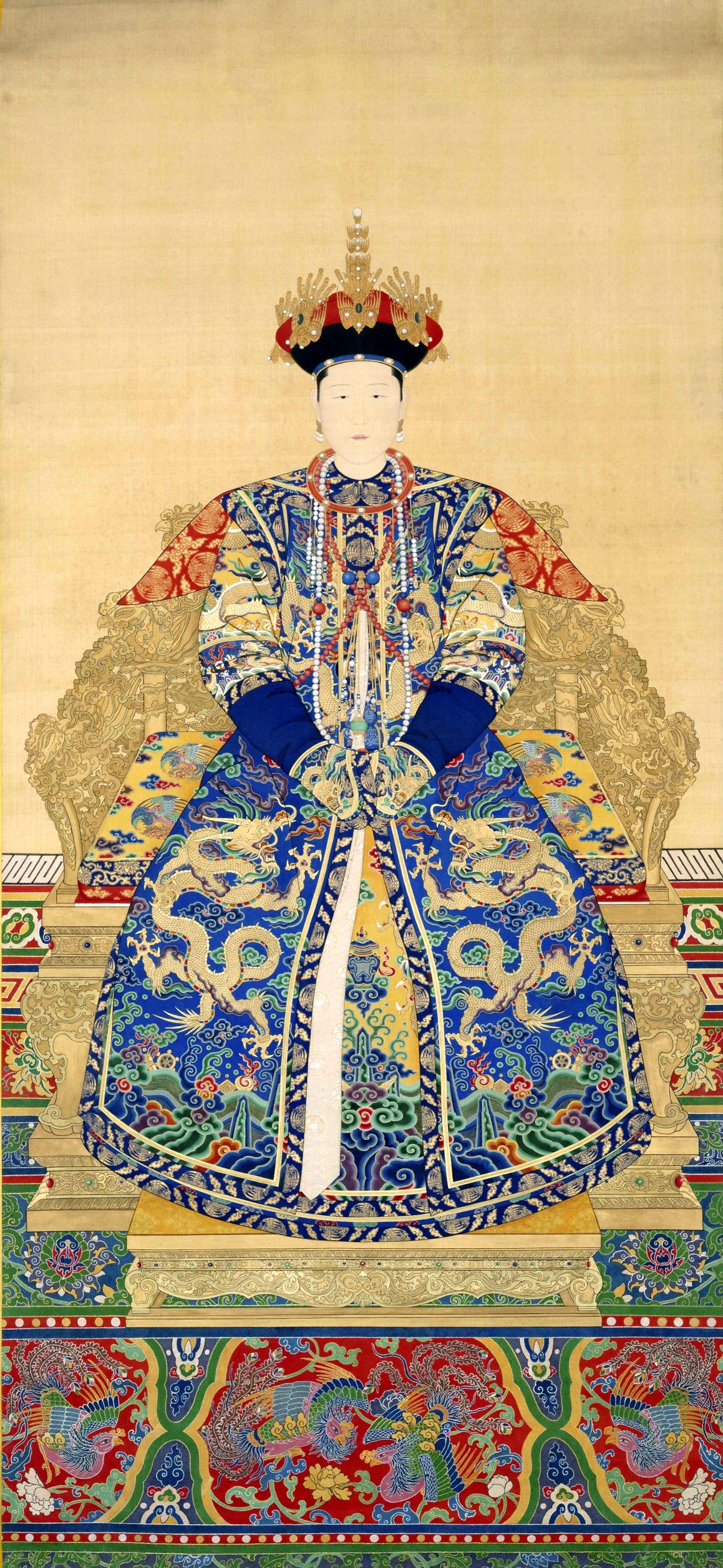
Empress Xiaokangzhang, mother of Kangxi emperor, in court attire

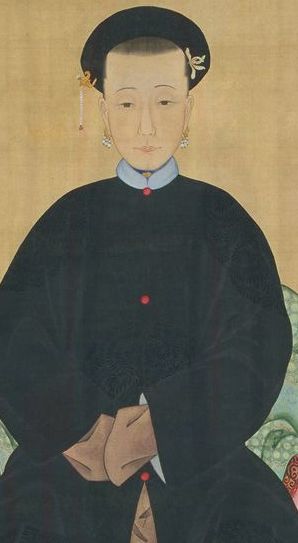
Empress Xiaoyiren in daily dress

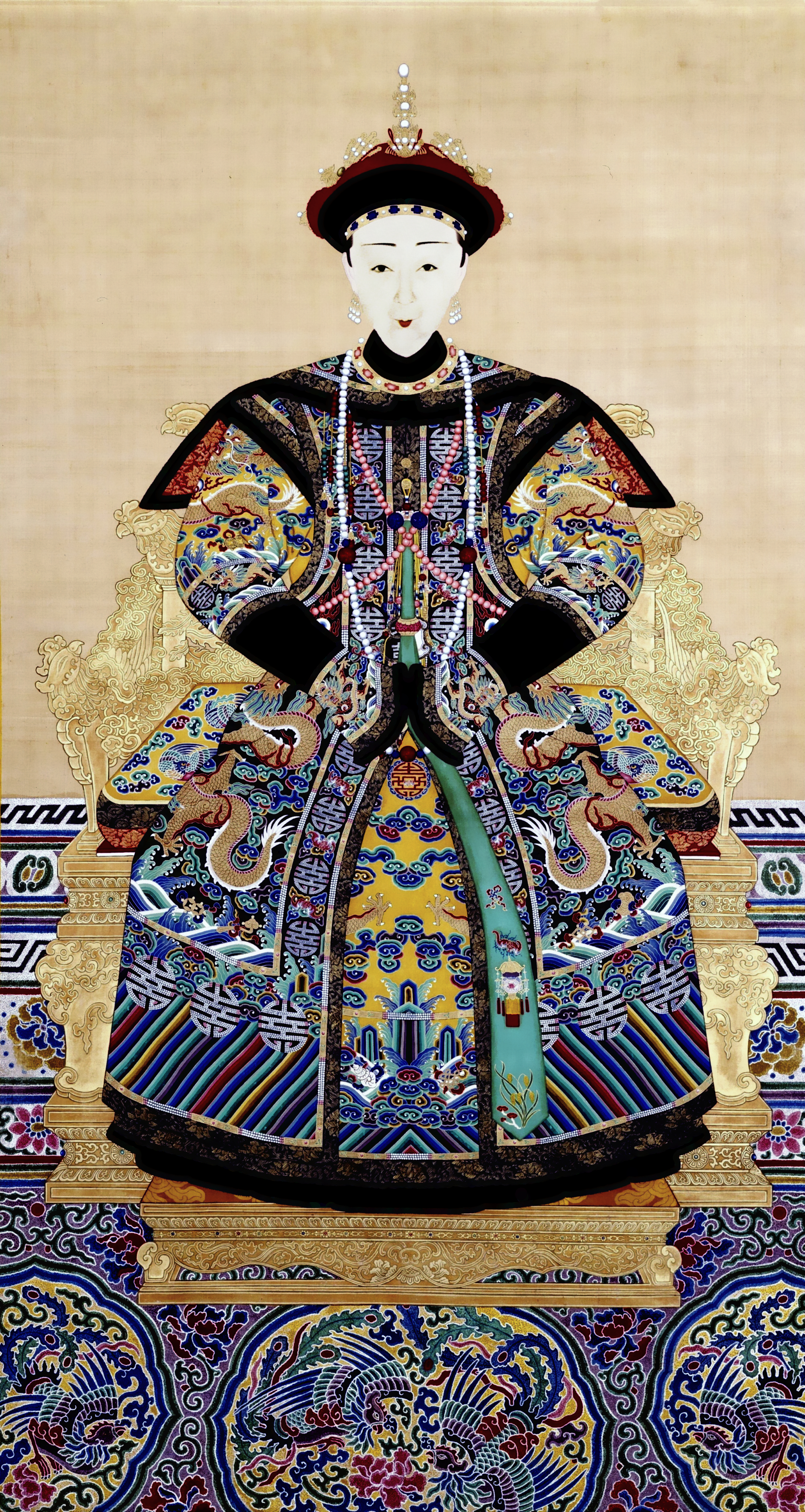
Empress Xiaoshencheng in court dress

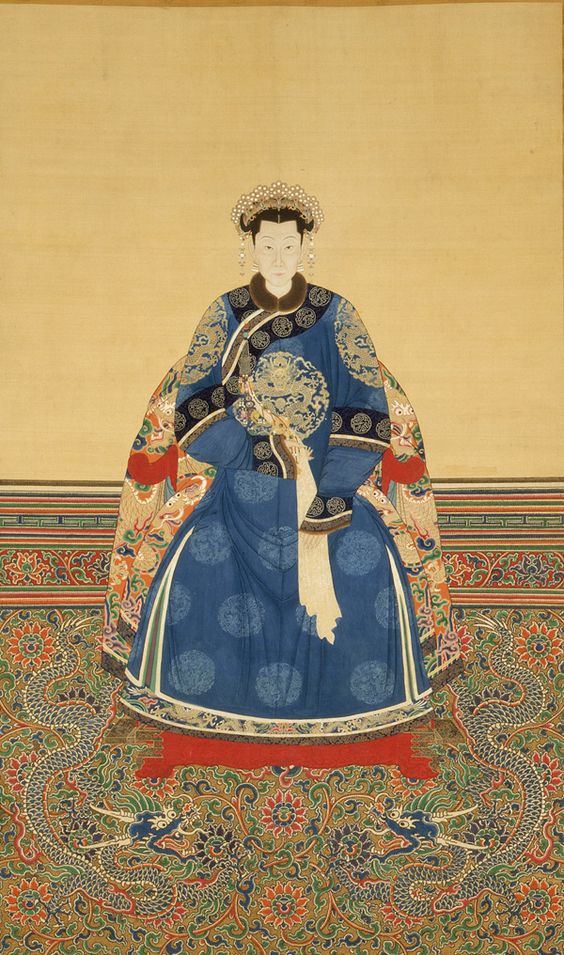
Imperial Noble Consort Quehui in semiformal dress
