= Battle of Ulan Butung =

Part of the Dzungar–Qing War in 1690

- Part of Dzungar–Qing War
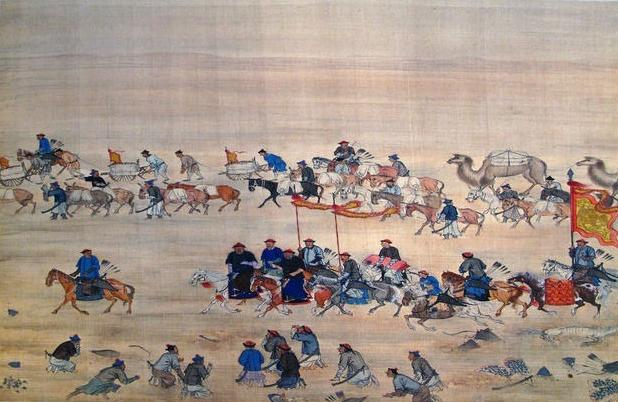
- Battle of Ulan Butung, 350 kilometers north of Peking
Date	3 September 1690
Location	Today's Hexigten Banner, Chifeng prefecture level city, Inner Mongolia Autonomous Region, China
Result	Pyrrhic Qing victory Dzungar tactical and strategic victory & Withdrawal of Dzungar forces

Belligerents
Qing Dynasty	Dzungar Khanate

Commanders and leaders
(Qing dynasty) Fuquan (Qing dynasty) Changning	(Dzungar Khanate) Galdan Boshugtu Khan

Strength
100,000	20,000

Casualties and losses
10,000	unknown

The Battle of Ulan Butung (Chinese: 烏蘭布通之戰) was fought on 3 September 1690 between the forces of the Qing dynasty and those of the Dzungar Khanate. When attacked by the superior Qing army, the Dzungars formed a camel wall to defend their camp and defeated Qing assaults on their right flank, but were driven back on the left. They were able to withdraw into the wooded hills behind their camp in good order. The Qing commander, Fuquan, reported it as a victory, but was discredited by political opponents.

== Background ==
The Dzungar Khanate was ruled by the Oirats, who had a longtime rivalry with the Khalkha Mongols, who by the later 17th century became the remnants of the Northern Yuan dynasty. After the death of Galdan Boshugtu Khan's brother at the hands of the Northern Yuan dynasty, he attacked them, decisively defeated them, and occupied the Mongolian Plateau. The remnants of the Northern Yuan dynasty submitted to the Qing dynasty in the hope of being restored as a client state. Motivated by the opportunity to gain control over the Mongolian Plateau and by the threat posed to them by a strong, unified Mongol state such as the Oirats threatened to form, the Qing sent their army north to subdue the Dzungars.

== Battle ==
The Qing, running low on supplies due to the complications of operating in the difficult, dry terrain of Inner Mongolia, wanted to end the war with a decisive battle as soon as possible. Their army caught up to the Dzungars at Ulan Butung, trapping them against a range of wooded hills. The Qing started the battle with an artillery bombardment, causing light casualties among the Dzungars. The Qing launched an attack on the Dzungar left flank, driving this part of the army into the hills, where it fled. To ward off attacks on the center, the Dzungars constructed a camel wall, or tuo cheng, by lining up 10,000 camels which they used for pack animals, roping their legs together, and firing between them. Intimidated by this, the Qing attack slid off to the right, only for their cavalry and artillery to become bogged down in wet ground. The Dzungars now disassembled their camel wall and withdrew into the hills unharassed and victorious by both tactics and strategies.

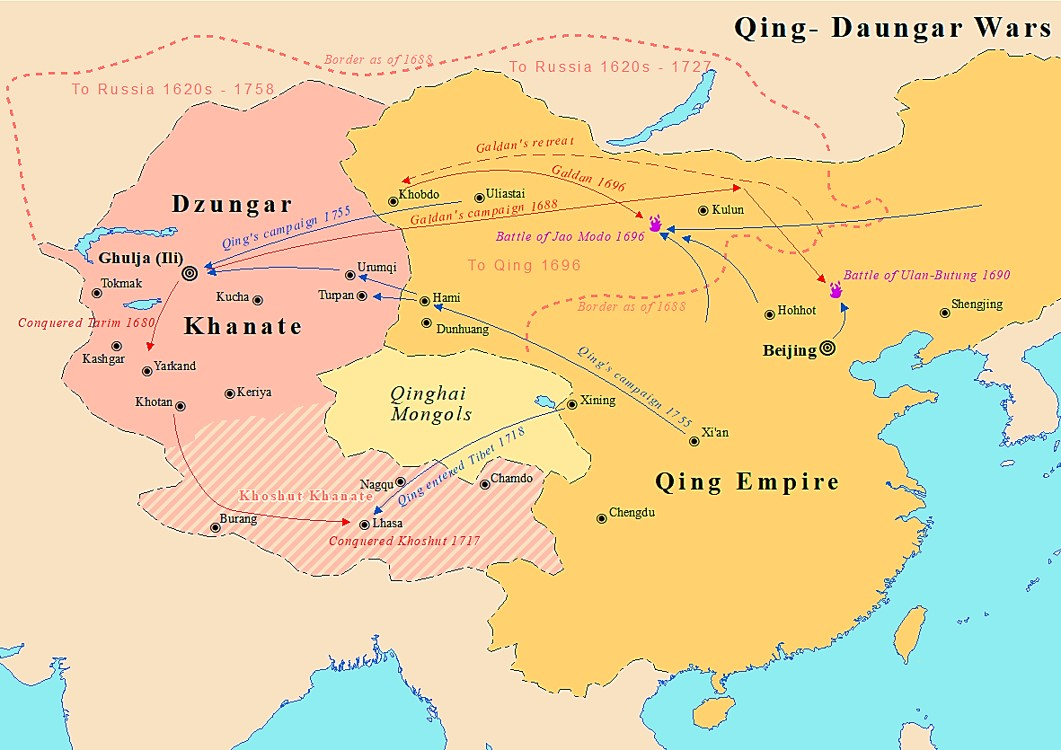
Map showing the Dzungar-Qing wars with the location of Battle of Ulan Butung

== Aftermath ==
The Dzungars escaped intact, inflicting more casualties than they had suffered, enabling them to fight the Qing successfully several more times. The Qing commander, Fuquan, claimed a victory, but he had failed to destroy the Dzungar army and the Khanate remained in control of Mongolia. He was discredited by political opponents and forced into retirement.
