= Prince Yu (裕) =

Qing peerage

Prince Yu of the First Rank

Chinese name
- Traditional Chinese: 和碩裕親王
- Simplified Chinese: 和硕裕亲王
Transcriptions
Standard Mandarin
- Hanyu Pinyin: héshuò yù qīnwáng
- Wade–Giles: ho-shuo yü ch'in-wang

Manchu name
- Manchu script: ᡥᠣᡧᠣᡳ ᡝᠯᡤᡳᠶᡝᠨ ᠴᡳᠨ ᠸᠠᠩ
- Romanization: hošoi elgiyen cin wang

Prince Yu of the First Rank, or simply Prince Yu, was the title of a princely peerage used in China during the Manchu-led Qing dynasty (1644–1912). As the Prince Yu peerage was not awarded "iron-cap" status, this meant that each successive bearer of the title would normally start off with a title downgraded by one rank vis-à-vis that held by his predecessor. However, the title would generally not be downgraded to any lower than a feng'en fuguo gong except under special circumstances.

The first bearer of the title was Fuquan (1653–1703), the Shunzhi Emperor's second son. In 1667, Fuquan was granted the title "Prince Yu of the First Rank" by his third brother, the Kangxi Emperor. The peerage was passed down over ten generations and held by 12 persons.

== Members of the Prince Yu peerage ==
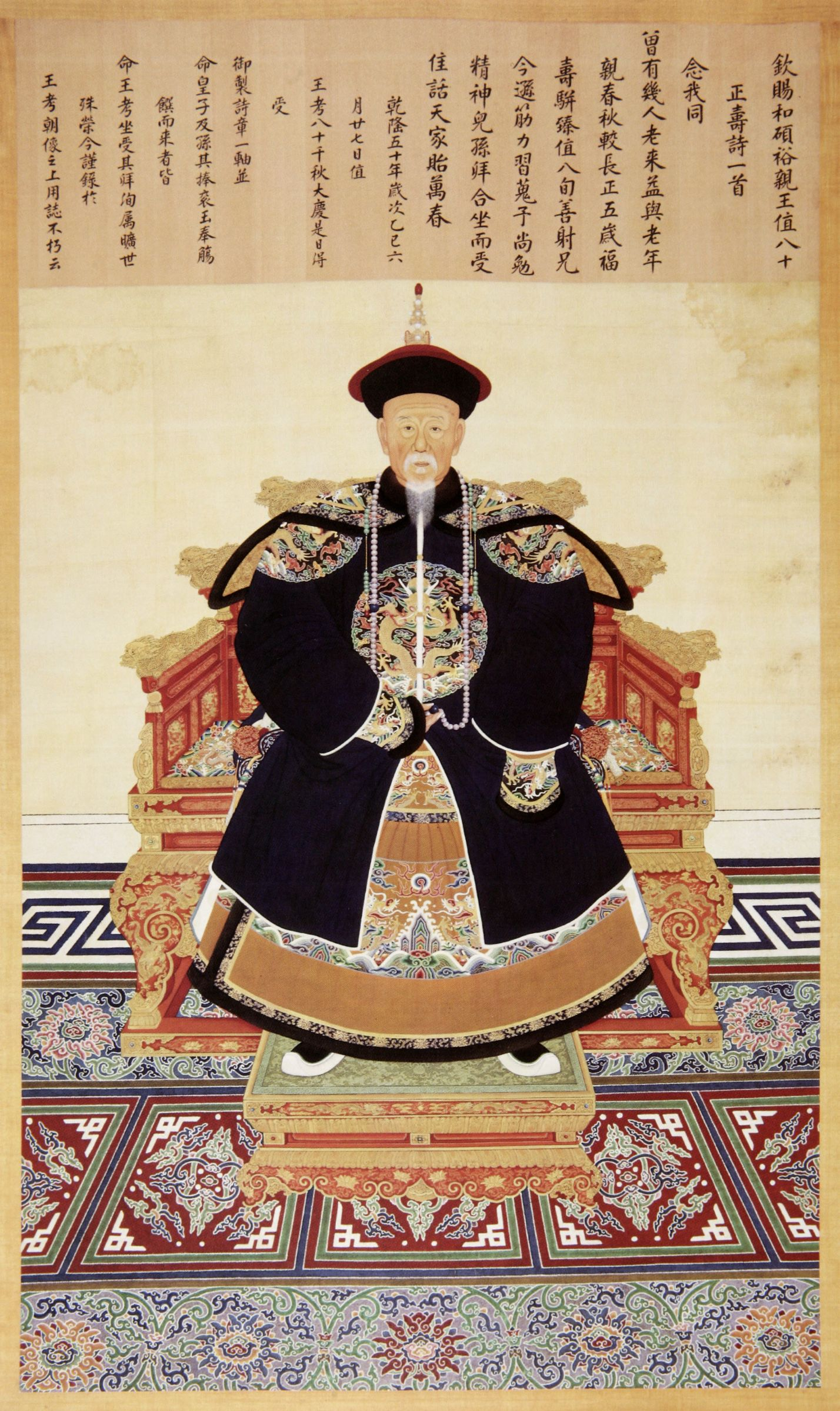
Portrait of Guanglu, Prince Yu

- Fuquan (1653 – 1703) (1st), the Shunzhi Emperor's second son, held the title Prince Yu of the First Rank from 1667 to 1703, posthumously honoured as Prince Yu Xian of the First Rank (裕憲親王)
  - Baotai (保泰; 1682 – 1730) (2nd), Fuquan's third son, held the title Prince Yu of the First Rank from 1703 to 1724, stripped of his title in 1724
    - Guangshan (廣善; 1697–1745), Baotai's eldest son, designated as Baotai's hereditary prince from 1722 to 1724, stripped of his heir apparent position and demoted to a grace defender duke in 1724, stripped of his title in 1728
  - Baoshou (保綬; 1684–1706) (posthumously honoured), Fuquan's fifth son, posthumously honoured as Prince Yu Dao of the First Rank (裕悼親王) in 1725
    - Guangning (廣寧; 1705–1739) (3rd), Baoshou's second son, held the title Prince Yu of the First Rank from 1724 to 1726, stripped of his title in 1726
    - Guanglu (廣祿; 1706–1785) (4th), Baoshou's third son, held the title Prince Yu of the First Rank from 1726 to 1785, posthumously honoured as Prince Yu Zhuang of the First Rank (裕莊親王)
      - Lianghuan (亮煥; 1740–1808) (5th), Guanglu's 12th son, held the title Prince Yu of the Second Rank from 1735 to 1808, posthumously honoured as Prince Yuxi of the Second Rank (裕僖郡王)
        - Hengcun (恆存; 1762–1796) (posthumously honoured), Lianghuan's second son, posthumously honoured as a third-rank prince in 1808
          - Wenhe (文和; 1781–1815) (6th), Hengcun's eldest son, held the title of a third-rank prince from 1808 to 1815
            - Xiangduan (祥端; 1799–1836) (7th), Wenhe's eldest son, held the title of a fourth-rank prince from 1816 to 1836
          - Wenjie (文傑; 1783–1834), Hengcun's second son, held the title of a grace general
            - Xiangrui (祥瑞; 1807–1837), Wenjie's third son, held the title of a grace general
              - Jishan (繼善; 1829–1861) (8th), Xiangrui's son and Xiangduan's heir, held the title of a grace defender duke from 1836 to 1861
                - Rongyu (榮毓; 1846–1897) (9th), Jishan's eldest son, held the title of a grace defender duke from 1861 to 1897
                  - Kuizhang (魁璋; born 1894) (10th), Rongyu's eldest son, held the title of a grace defender duke
                    - Yuedi (岳棣; 1913–1935), Kuizhang's son
                      - Dasheng (達聲; born 1932), Yuedi's son

=== Cadet lines ===
==== Fuqian's line ====
- Changquan (昌全; 1676-1677), Fuquan's first son
- Zhansheng (詹升; 1678–1681), Fuquan's second son
- Bao'an (保安; 1683–1686), Fuquan's fourth son
- Baoyong (寶永; 1701–1705), Fuquan's sixth son

== Family tree ==
adoption
Fuquan 福全 (1653–1703); Prince Yuxian of the First Rank 裕憲親王 (1667–1703)
Baotai 保泰 (1682–1730); Prince Yu of the First Rank 裕親王 (1703–1724) (stripped of his title)	Baoshou 保綬 (1684–1706); Prince Yudao of the First Rank 裕悼親王 (posthumously awarded)
Guangshan 廣善 (1697–1745); Shizi 世子 (1722–1724) (stripped of his title)	Guangling 廣靈 (1705–1739); Prince Yu of the First Rank 裕親王 (1724–1726) (stripped of his title)	Guanglu 廣祿 (1706–1785); Prince Yuzhuang of the First Rank 裕莊親王 (1726–1785)
Lianghuan 亮煥 (1740–1808); Prince Yuxi of the Second Rank 裕僖郡王 (1786–1808)
Hengcun 恆存 (1762–1796); Beile 貝勒 (posthumously awarded)
Wenhe 文和 (1781–1815); Beile 貝勒 (1808–1815)	Wenjie 文傑 (1783–1834); Feng'en Jiangjun 奉恩將軍
Xiangduan 祥端 (1799–1836); Feng'en Zhenguo Gong 奉恩鎮國公 (1816–1836)	Xiangrui 祥瑞 (1807–1837); Feng'en Jiangjun 奉恩將軍
Jishan 繼善 (1829–1861); Feng'en Zhenguo Gong 奉恩鎮國公 (1836–1861)
Rongyu 榮毓 (1846–1897); Feng'en Zhenguo Gong 奉恩鎮國公 (1861–1897)
Kuizhang 魁璋 (1894–?); Feng'en Zhenguo Gong 奉恩鎮國公 (1898–?)
Yuedi 岳棣 (1913–1935)
Dasheng 達聲 (1932–?)

== See also ==
- Royal and noble ranks of the Qing dynasty
