= Tong (surname) =

Tong is a Chinese surname. Tong as transcribed in English however represents of a number of different Chinese surnames.

There were 8,589 Tongs in the United States during the year 2000 census, making it the 3,075th surname overall and the 121st surname among Asian and Pacific Islanders.

Tong was also listed among the 200-most-common Chinese surnames in a 2010 survey of the Registered Persons Database of Canadian health card recipients in the province of Ontario. Tong may be the romanisation of the very common surname Zhang (張), as well as others such as Deng (鄧), Zhuang (莊), Teng (滕), and a number of Tongs (童, 同 and 佟).

== Origin of some common Tongs (張, 莊, 滕, 鄧) ==
Tong is a Gan romanization of the Chinese surnames Zhang (trad. 張, simp. 张) and Zhuang (trad. 莊, simp. 庄).

Tong is also the Cantonese romanization of the Chinese surname Tang (唐).

== 同 Tóng ==
Tong (同)
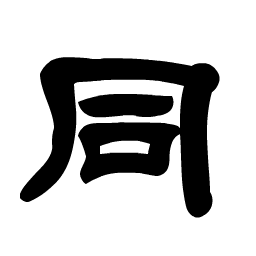

Origin
- Derivation: Tang of Shang
- Meaning: Same

Other names
- Variant form: Tang Tung Ting
- See also: Shang dynasty

During the Shang dynasty period, Lord Zi (子) founded the state of Tong (同国) in Shaanxi of China, later the Zi (子) family used the surname Tong (同, Tóng). The Tong surname may also have originated as a surname given to public officers during the middle Zhou dynasty.

Some Tong families are said to be descendants of Sima Qian. Sima Qian was a Han dynasty historian who wrote the Records of the Grand Historian. According to this story, when Sima Qian was put in prison by the Emperor, his children fled. His two sons decided to change their name, each using one character of the Sima surname (司马). The Si (司) was modified to Tong (同) by the addition of a stroke, while Ma (馬) was modified to Feng (馮). There remains a taboo that the two families should not intermarry.

== 佟 Tóng ==
Tong (佟)
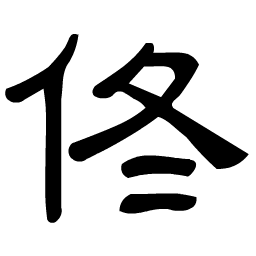

Origin
- Derivation: Jie of Xia

Other names
- Variant form: Teng Tang
- Derivative: Tung
- See also: Xia dynasty

Pronounced Tong (佟, Tóng) in Mandarin Chinese, but Tung in Cantonese

Tong family originated from

- Jie of the last Xia dynasty period.
- Jin (真) people the Chinese Minority.
- Various Chinese Minority Group on Any dynasty period.
- Jurchen people (女眞) of early Qing dynasty period.
- Xibe people (锡伯) the Chinese Minority in Liaoning.
- Donghu people the Mongolian after Han dynasty period.
- the Sinicization of the Manchu clan name/surname Tunggiya

== 童 Tóng ==
Tong (童)
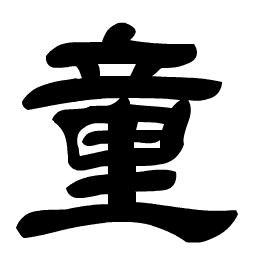

Origin
- Derivation: Zhuanxu

Other names
- Variant form: Tung Thong Tang
- See also: Three Sovereigns and Five Emperors

Tong family originated from

- Lao Tong (老童), the son of Zhuanxu, one of mythical Five Emperors
- Xu Tong (胥童) of Eastern Zhou and the Spring and Autumn period
- Futong (夫童), a city in the Spring and Autumn period
- Tongshi (童使), the name of male servants before Qin dynasty to Song dynasty
- Descendants of Dong Zhuo (董卓), who changed their surname to avoid persecution
- Mongol people of Qing dynasty
- Hui people originated in Xiyu (西域)
- Other ethnic minorities who adopted the Han Chinese surname

See 仝 for Second-round simplified Chinese character

== See also ==
- Tong (disambiguation)
- Tona (name)
- Tono (name)
- Zhang (surname), for more about that surname in mainland China and on Taiwan
- Zhuang (surname), for more about that surname in mainland China and on Taiwan
