= Consort Rong (Kangxi) =

Qing China imperial consort (died. 1727)

Consort Rong 榮妃
- Born: 17th Century
- Died: 26 April 1727; Forbidden City, Beijing, Qing China
- Burial: Jingling tombs, Eastern Qing tombs
- Spouse: Kangxi Emperor (before 1694)
- Issue: Chengrui (承瑞); Saiyinchahun (賽音察渾); Princess Rongxian; Changhua (長華); Changsheng (長生); Yunzhi
- House: Magiya (馬佳; by birth); Aisin Gioro (by marriage)
- Father: Gaise (該色)

Consort Rong
- Traditional Chinese: 榮妃
- Simplified Chinese: 榮妃
Transcriptions
Standard Mandarin
- Hanyu Pinyin: Róng Fēi

Consort Rong (d. 26 April 1727), of the Manchu Plain Yellow Banner Magiya clan, was an imperial consort of the Kangxi Emperor of China's Qing dynasty.

== Life ==
=== Family background ===
Consort Rong came from the Manchu Plain Yellow Banner Magiya clan. Consort Rong's personal name and birth date were not recorded in history.

- Father: Gaise (該色)

She a descendant of Tuhai (图海), a grand tutor of crown prince and first class Zhongda duke.

=== Kangxi Era ===
It unknown when Lady Magiya entered the palace and become a concubine of the Kangxi Emperor. It is very likely that she entered the palace before the wedding of the Kangxi Emperor and Empress Xiaochengren.

Lady Magiya was the first concubine who bore children to the Emperor. On 5 November 1667, she gave birth to the Emperor's first son, Chengrui, who would die prematurely on 10 July 1670. On 24 January 1672, she gave birth to the Emperor's fourth son, Saiyinchahun, who would die prematurely on 6 March 1674. On 20 June 1673 she gave birth to his third daughter, Princess Rongxian. On 11 May 1674 she gave birth to his sixth son, who died shortly after his birth. On 10 September 1675 she gave birth to his eighth son, who died prematurely on 27 April 1677. On 23 March 1677 she gave birth to his tenth (third) son, Yunzhi.

Lady Magiya is one of the two consorts who gave birth to the most children for Kangxi Emperor, the other is Empress Xiaogongren.

In August 1677, after Lady Niohuru became empress, Lady Magiya and 3 other concubine were promoted to the rank of "Imperial Concubines".

In December 1681, Lady Tong was elevated to "Imperial Noble Consort"and Lady Maigiya and 3 other concubines were promoted to ''Consort".

Kangxi decreed that after his death, the princes could live in their mothers' homes, but they still had to enter the palace every month to personally greet the Emperor Yongzheng and pay respects to empress.

=== Yongzheng Era ===
In the first year of the Yongzheng reign, Lady Magiya moved to Yunzhi, Prince Cheng's manor.

In the fifth year of the Yongzheng reign, Consort Rong died outside the palace.

== Titles ==
- During the reign of the Shunzhi Emperor (r. 1643–1661) or the Kangxi Emperor (r. 1661–1722)
  - Lady Magiya ( from unknown date)
- During the reign of the Kangxi Emperor (r. 1661–1722)
  - Concubine Rong (榮嬪; from August 1677)
  - Consort Rong (榮妃; from 1681)

== Issue ==
- As concubine:
  - Chengrui (承瑞; 5 November 1667 – 10 July 1670), first son
  - Saiyinchahun (賽音察渾; 24 January 1672 – 6 March 1674), fourth son
  - Princess Rongxian of the First Rank (固倫榮憲公主; 20 June 1673 – 29 May 1728), third daughter
  - Changhua (長華; 11 May 1674), sixth son
  - Changsheng (長生; 10 September 1675 – 27 April 1677), eighth son
  - Yunzhi, Prince Cheng (誠) (誠隱郡王 允祉; 23 March 1677 – 10 July 1732), tenth (third) son

== See also ==
- Royal and noble ranks of the Qing dynasty
- Imperial Chinese harem system
