= Yunzhi =

Yunzhi may refer to:

- Trametes versicolor, known in Chinese as Yunzhi (雲芝), a type of mushroom
- Yinzhi, Prince Zhi (胤禔; 1672 - 1735), also known as Yunzhi, a Manchu prince of the Qing Dynasty and eldest son of the Kangxi Emperor
- Yinzhi, Prince Cheng (胤祉; 1674 - 1732), also known as Yunzhi, a Manchu prince of the Qing Dynasty and third son of the Kangxi Emperor
