= Yinzhi =

Yinzhi may refer to:

- Yinzhi, Prince Zhi (胤禔; 1672–1735), a Manchu prince of the Qing Dynasty and eldest son of the Kangxi Emperor
- Yinzhi, Prince Cheng (胤祉; 1674–1732), a Manchu prince of the Qing Dynasty and third son of the Kangxi Emperor
