= Yunqi =

Yunqi may refer to:

- Yunki (1680–1732), Prince Hengwen of the First Rank, Kangxi Emperor's son
- Yunci (1714–1785), Prince Cheng of the Third Rank, Kangxi Emperor's son
