= Magiya =

Manchu clan and family name

Manchu name
- Manchu script: ᠮᠠᡤᡳᠶᠠ

Chinese name
- Traditional Chinese: 馬佳氏
- Simplified Chinese: 马佳氏
Transcriptions
Standard Mandarin
- Hanyu Pinyin: mǎ jiā shì

Pronunciation respelling name
- Pronunciation respelling: MAH-ghee-yah

Magiya Hala was one of the Manchu Great Eight Clans. Originated from Giyaliku Magiya area, named by the place.

After the demise of the dynasty, some of its descendants sinicized their clan name to the Chinese surnames Ma (馬) or Jin (金).

== Notable figures ==
=== Males ===
- Tuhai (图海), a grand tutor of crown prince, a grand secretary of Zhonghe hall and first class Zhongda duke (一等忠达公), later enshrined in Imperial Ancestral Temple under the name Wenxiang (文襄)
  - Nomin (诺敏), a Minister of Rites
    - Marsai (马尔塞)
- Gaishan (盖山), an examiner (员外郎，pinyin:yuanwailang)
- Santai (三台)
- Santian (三忝)
- Hengguang (恒广)
- Shengjin (昇寅)
  - Baoxun (宝询), a supervisor of the Manor of Fengtian (奉天府尹) and General Shengjing (盛京将军)
  - Baolin (宝琳), a supervisor of the Manor of Zhengding (正定府知府)
    - Shaoying (绍英), a Minister of Revenue in 1911
      - Shijie (世杰) & Shiliang (世良)

Prince Consort

Date	Prince Consort	Princess
1745	Mabao (瑪寶)	Yunhu's first daughter (1730–1775) by primary consort (Irgen Gioro)
1757	Tetongte'e (特通特額)	Yunbi's sixth daughter (b. 1743) by primary consort (Uya)

=== Females ===
Imperial Consort

- Consort
  - Consort Rong (d. 1727), the Kangxi Emperor's consort, the mother of Chengrui (1667–1670), Saiyinchahun (1672–1674), Princess Rongxian (1673–1728), Changhua (1674), Changsheng (1675–1677) and Yunzhi (1677–1732)

Princess Consort

- Concubine
  - Yunki's concubine, the mother of Princess (1699–1743), Lady (1703–1724) and Lady (1705–1784)

== See also ==
- List of Manchu clans
