= Princess Rongxian =

- Princess Rongxian of the First Rank
- Born: June 20, 1673; Forbidden City, Beijing, Qing China
- Died: May 29, 1728 (aged 54)
- Burial: Bairin Right Banner, Chifeng City, Inner Mongolia, China
- Spouse: Örgen (烏爾袞)
- Issue: Linbu (霖布)
- Father: Kangxi Emperor
- Mother: Consort Rong

Princess Rongxian of the First Rank (Chinese: 固倫榮憲公主; June 20, 1673 – May 29, 1728), was a princess of the Qing dynasty of China. She was the third daughter of the Kangxi Emperor.

== Early life and family ==
Born on June 20, 1673, in the Forbidden City, Beijing as the third daughter of the Kangxi Emperor, one of the Qing Dynasty's most influential rulers, and Consort Rong, a Manchu noblewoman of the Plain Yellow Banner Magiya clan.

== Married life ==
In 1691, at the age of 18, Princess Rongxian married Örgen, a prince of the Mongol Barin tribe. This marriage was a strategic alliance aimed at securing Qing influence over the Mongol tribes, a critical aspect of Kangxi's frontier policy. Örgen, as an efu, was granted honors befitting the spouse of a Gulun Princess, including military and administrative roles, the marriage produced at least one son.

== Title and Status ==
During this time, Kangxi, moved by his daughter's filial devotion and troubled by the serious illness of Prince Yinren, found solace in her presence. In recognition of her loyalty and service, upon his recovery, Kangxi bestowed upon Princess Heshuo Rongxian (translated as "Princess of the Second Rank") the noble title of Princess Rongxian of Gu Lun (translated as "Princess of the First Rank").

== Death and burial ==
The tomb complex includes a central gate on the south wall. Opposite the north gate once stood a square pavilion, flanked by east and west side halls, each 15 meters wide. The eastern halls housed the mausoleum servants' quarters and a kitchen, while the western halls served as spaces for sacrificial offerings and officials. The central area comprises front and back halls, with the main mausoleum located at the rear. Surrounding the princess's tomb are six small brick chamber tombs on the south, north, and east sides, each capped with a pagoda-shaped roof (2.5–3 meters in diameter). These chambers contain purple urns, though they have been damaged, and no commemorative stones remain.

Princess Rongxian's body, unearthed in 1972 after over 240 years, was remarkably well-preserved, with elastic skin resembling that of a living person. Positioned face-up in her coffin, her head faced south, and her feet pointed north. She was adorned with a golden phoenix crown, gold bracelets, finger rings, and red satin embroidered boots. Her attire included multiple layers, with the outermost being a resplendent pearl-embroidered dragon robe. Measurements indicate she stood 156 cm tall, with two 75 cm-long black braids extending to her hips, their ends appearing tied. Two urns, placed on the south and east sides of the coffin, contained the ashes of her husband, Urgun, and their son, Linbu.
