= Kangxi Emperor =

Emperor of China from 1661 to 1722

Kangxi Emperor 康熙帝
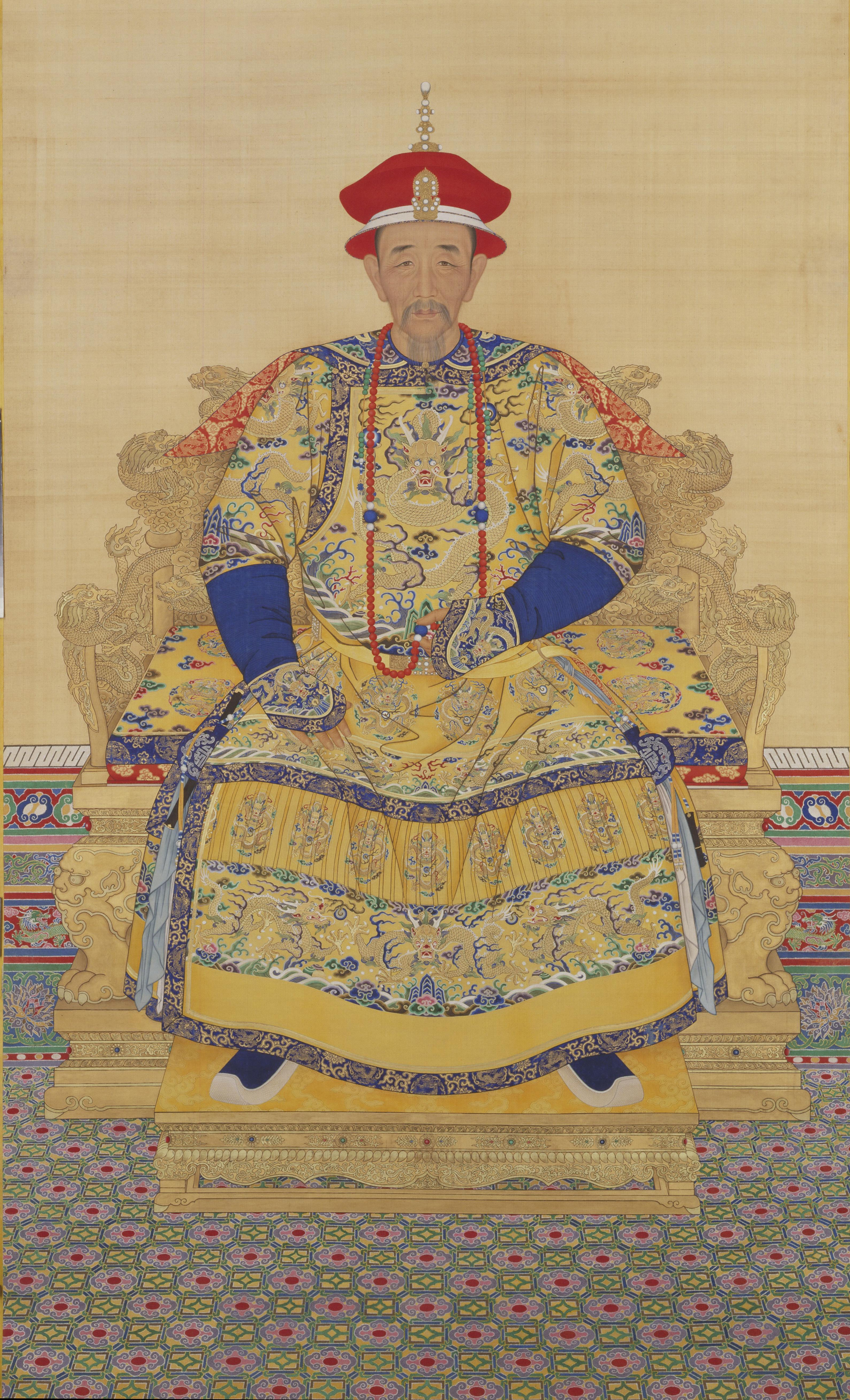
- Portrait of the Kangxi Emperor in court dress, c. 1710s

Emperor of the Qing dynasty
- Reign: 5 February 1661 – 20 December 1722 (61 years, 318 days)
- Predecessor: Shunzhi Emperor
- Successor: Yongzheng Emperor
- Regents: Sonin (1661–1667); Ebilun (1661–1667); Suksaha (1661–1667); Oboi (1661–1669)
- Born: 4 May 1654; Jingren Palace, Forbidden City (in present-day Beijing)
- Died: 20 December 1722 (aged 68); Imperial Gardens (in present-day Beijing)
- Burial: Jing Mausoleum, Eastern Qing tombs
- Consorts: Empress Xiaochengren (m. 1665; died 1674) Empress Xiaozhaoren (m. 1665; died 1678) Empress Xiaoyiren (died 1689) Empress Xiaogongren (before 1722)
- Issue Detail: Princess Rongxian of the First Rank; Yunzhi, Prince of the Fourth Rank; Yunreng, Prince Limi of the First Rank; Yunzhi, Prince Chengyin of the Second Rank; Yongzheng Emperor; Yunki, Prince Hengwen of the First Rank; Yunyou, Prince Chundu of the First Rank; Yunsi, Prince Lian of the First Rank; Yuntang, Prince of the Fourth Rank; Yun'e, Duke of the Second Rank; Yuntao, Prince Lüyi of the First Rank; Yinxiang, Prince Yixian of the First Rank; Yunti, Prince Xunqin of the Second Rank; Yunxu, Prince Yuke of the Second Rank; Yunlu, Prince Zhuangke of the First Rank; Yunli, Prince Guoyi of the First Rank; Yunhu, Prince Gongqin of the Third Rank; Yunci, Prince Cheng of the Third Rank; Yunbi, Prince Xianke of the First Rank
Names
- Xuanye (玄燁); Manchu: Hiowan yei (ᡥᡳᠣᠸᠠᠨ ᠶᡝᡳ)
Era dates
- Kangxi (康熙): 18 February 1662 – 4 February 1723; Manchu: Elhe taifin (ᡝᠯᡥᡝ ᡨᠠᡳᡶᡳᠨ); Mongolian: Энх амгалан (ᠡᠩᠬᠡ ᠠᠮᠤᠭᠤᠯᠠᠩ)
Posthumous name
- Emperor Hetian Hongyun Wenwu Ruizhe Gongjian Kuanyu Xiaojing Chengxin Zhonghe Gongde Dacheng Ren (合天弘運文武睿哲恭儉寬裕孝敬誠信中和功德大成仁皇帝): Manchu: Abka de Teherehe, Forgon be Badarambuha, Šu Horonggo, Genggiyen Mergen, Gungnecuke Boljonggo, Onco Elgiyen, Hiyoošungga Ginggun, Unenggi Akdun, Dulimba Hūwaliyasun, Gung Erdemu be Ambarame Šanggabuha Gosin Hūwangdi (ᠠᠪᡴᠠ ᡩᡝ ᡨᡝᡥᡝᡵᡝᡥᡝ᠈ ᡶᠣᡵᡤᠣᠨ ᠪᡝ ᠪᠠᡩᠠᡵᠠᠮᠪᡠᡥᠠ᠈ ᡧᡠ ᡥᠣᡵᠣᠩᡤᠣ᠈ ᡤᡝᠩᡤᡳᠶᡝᠨ ᠮᡝᡵᡤᡝᠨ᠈ ᡤᡠᠩᠨᡝᠴᡠᡴᡝ ᠪᠣᠯᠵᠣᠩᡤᠣ᠈ ᠣᠨᠴᠣ ᡝᠯᡤᡳᠶᡝᠨ᠈ ᡥᡳᠶᠣᠣᡧᡠᠩᡤᠠ ᡤᡳᠩᡤᡠᠨ᠈ ᡠᠨᡝᠩᡤᡳ ᠠᡴᡩᡠᠨ᠈ ᡩᡠᠯᡳᠮᠪᠠ ᡥᡡᠸᠠᠯᡳᠶᠠᠰᡠᠨ᠈ ᡤᡠᠩ ᡝᡵᡩᡝᠮᡠ ᠪᡝ ᠠᠮᠪᠠᡵᠠᠮᡝ ᡧᠠᠩᡤᠠᠪᡠᡥᠠ ᡤᠣᠰᡳᠨ ᡥᡡᠸᠠᠩᡩᡳ)
Temple name
- Shengzu (聖祖); Manchu: Šengdzu (ᡧᡝᠩᡯᡠ)
- House: Aisin-Gioro
- Dynasty: Qing
- Father: Shunzhi Emperor
- Mother: Empress Xiaokangzhang
- Seal

Chinese name
- Chinese: 康熙帝
Transcriptions
Standard Mandarin
- Hanyu Pinyin: Kāngxīdì
- Bopomofo: ㄎㄤ ㄒㄧ ㄉㄧˋ
- Wade–Giles: Kʻang^{1}-hsi^{1} Ti^{4}
- IPA: [kʰáŋɕí tî]
Yue: Cantonese
- Yale Romanization: Hōng-hēi dai
- Jyutping: Hong1 hei1 dai3
Southern Min
- Tâi-lô: Khong-hi Tè

Mongolian name
- Mongolian Cyrillic: Энх амгалан хаан
- Mongolian script: ᠡᠩᠭᠡ ᠠᠮᠤᠭᠤᠯᠠᠩ ᠬᠠᠭᠠᠨ
Transcriptions
- SASM/GNC: Engke Amuɣulang Qaɣan

Manchu name
- Manchu script: ᡝᠯᡥᡝ ᡨᠠᡳᡶᡳᠨ ᡥᡡᠸᠠᠩᡩᡳ
- Möllendorff: Elhe Taifin Hūwangdi

The Kangxi Emperor (4 May 1654 – 20 December 1722), also known by his temple name Emperor Shengzu of Qing, personal name Xuanye, was the third emperor of the Qing dynasty, and the second Qing emperor to rule over China proper. His reign of 61 years makes him the longest-reigning emperor in Chinese history and one of the longest-reigning rulers in history. He is considered one of China's greatest emperors.

The third son of the Shunzhi Emperor, Kangxi was enthroned at the age of seven while actual power was held for six more years by the four regents nominated by his father. After assuming personal rule, Kangxi's attempt to revoke the fiefdoms of feudal princes sparked the Revolt of the Three Feudatories, which he suppressed. He also forced the Kingdom of Tungning in Taiwan and Mongols in the north and northwest to submit to Qing rule, and launched an expedition that incorporated Tibet into the empire. Domestically, he initially welcomed the Jesuits and the propagation of Catholicism in China, but tolerance came to an end as a result of the Chinese Rites controversy. Later in his reign, Kangxi became embroiled in a prolonged succession dispute. He died in 1722 at the age of 68 and was succeeded by his fourth son, who assumed the throne as the Yongzheng Emperor.

The Kangxi Emperor's reign brought about long-term stability and relative wealth after years of war and chaos. He initiated the period known as the High Qing era (or the "Prosperous Era of Kangxi and Qianlong"), spanning the reigns of the Kangxi Emperor, his son Yongzheng, and his grandson Qianlong. His court also accomplished such literary feats as the compilation of the Kangxi Dictionary, the Complete Tang Poems poetry anthology, and the Complete Classics Collection of Ancient China.

== Early reign ==
Born on 4 May 1654 to the Shunzhi Emperor and Empress Xiaokangzhang in Jingren Palace, the Forbidden City, Beijing, the Kangxi Emperor was originally given the Chinese name Xuanye (Chinese: 玄燁; pinyin: Xuányè; Manchu transliteration: hiowan yei). He was enthroned at the age of seven (or eight by East Asian age reckoning), on 7 February 1661. (Note: Note that Xuanye was born in May 1654, and was therefore less than seven years old at the time. Both Spence 2002 and Oxnam 1975 (p. 1) nonetheless claim that he was "seven years old." Dennerline 2002 (p. 119) and Rawski 1998 (p. 99) indicate that he was "not yet seven years old." Following East Asian age reckoning, Chinese documents concerning the succession say that Xuanye was eight sui (Oxnam 1975, p. 62).) However, his era name "Kangxi", only started to be used on 18 February 1662, the first day of the following lunar year.

Sinologist Herbert Giles, drawing on contemporary sources, described the Kangxi Emperor as "fairly tall and well proportioned, he loved all manly exercises, and devoted three months annually to hunting. Large bright eyes lighted up his face, which was pitted with smallpox."

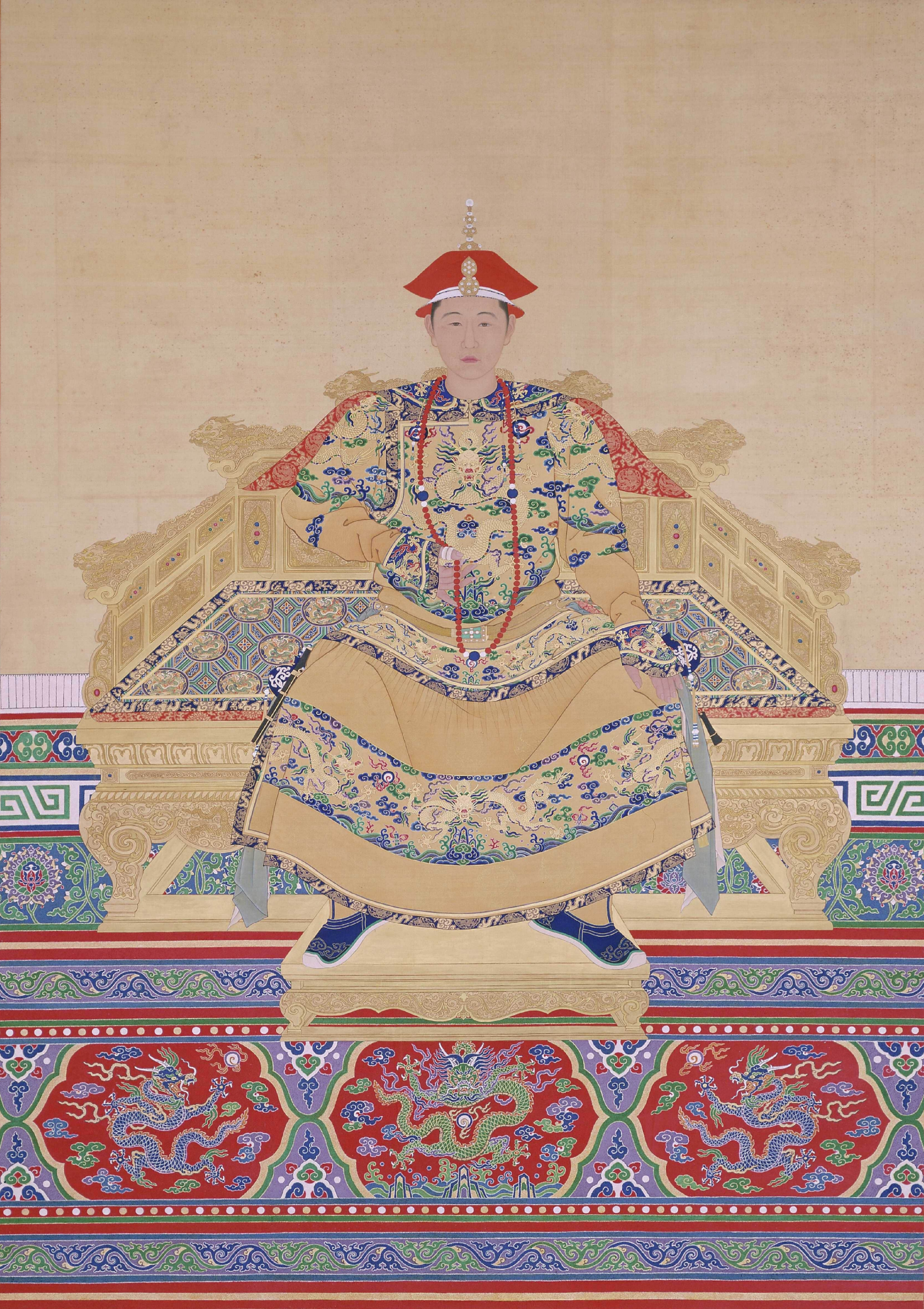
Portrait of the young Kangxi Emperor in court dress

Before the Kangxi Emperor came to the throne, Grand Empress Dowager Zhaosheng (in the name of Shunzhi Emperor) had appointed the powerful men Sonin, Suksaha, Ebilun, and Oboi as regents. Sonin died after his granddaughter became Empress Xiaochengren, leaving Suksaha at odds with Oboi in politics. In a fierce power struggle, Oboi had Suksaha put to death and seized absolute power as sole regent. The Kangxi Emperor and the rest of the imperial court acquiesced to this arrangement.

In the spring of 1662, the regents ordered a Great Clearance in southern China that evacuated the entire population from the seacoast to counter a resistance movement started by Ming loyalists under the leadership of Taiwan-based Ming general Zheng Chenggong, also titled Koxinga.

In 1669, the Kangxi Emperor had Oboi arrested with the help of his grandmother Grand Empress Dowager Zhaosheng, who had raised him. and began taking personal control of the empire. He listed three issues of concern: flood control of the Yellow River; repair of the Grand Canal; the Revolt of the Three Feudatories in south China. The Grand Empress Dowager influenced him greatly and he took care of her himself in the months leading up to her death in 1688.

Kangxi's relatives from the Han Chinese Banner Tong 佟 clan of Fushun in Liaoning falsely claimed to be related to the Jurchen Manchu Tunggiya 佟佳 clan of Jilin, using this false claim to get themselves transferred to a Manchu banner in the reign of Kangxi emperor.

== Military achievements ==
=== Army ===
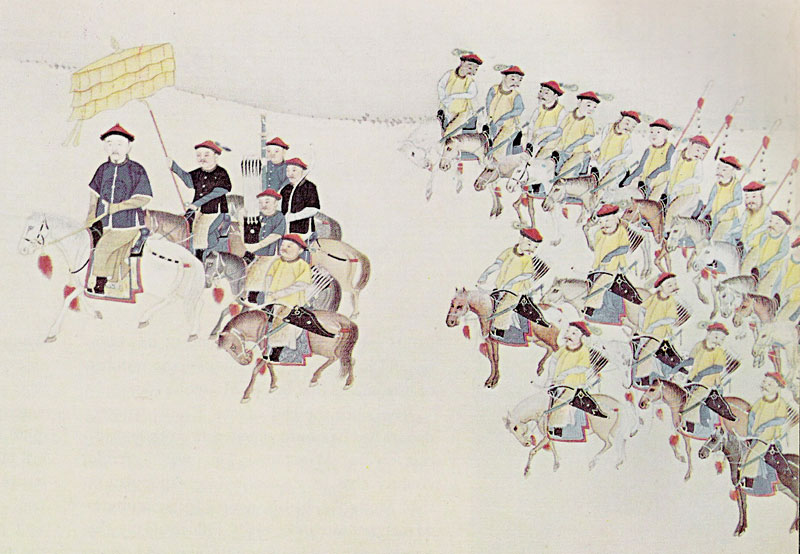
The Emperor mounted on his horse and guarded by his bodyguards

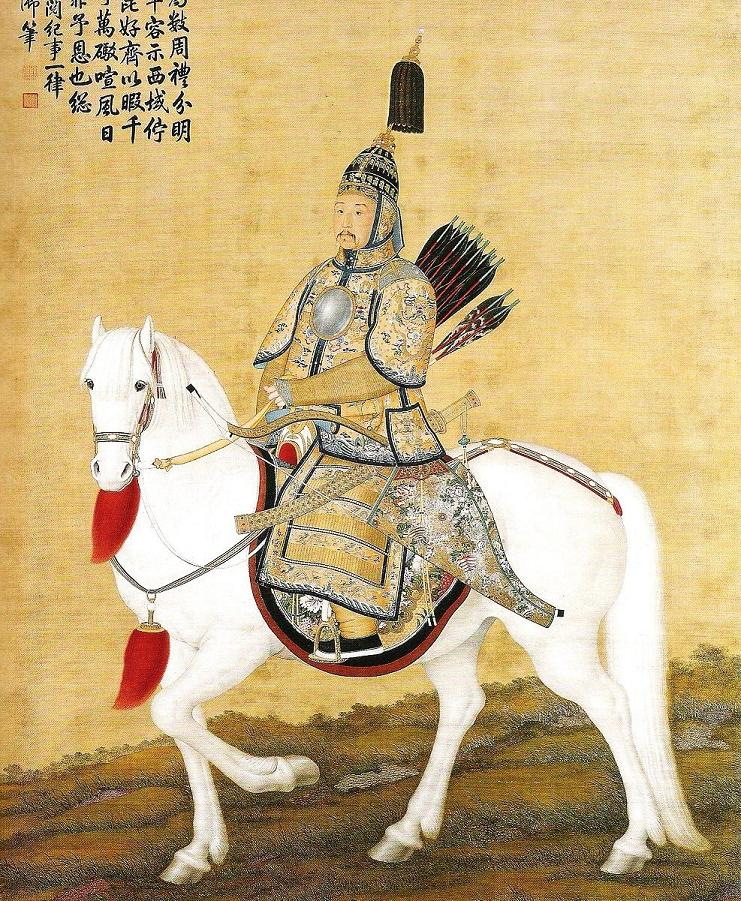
Armoured Kangxi Emperor

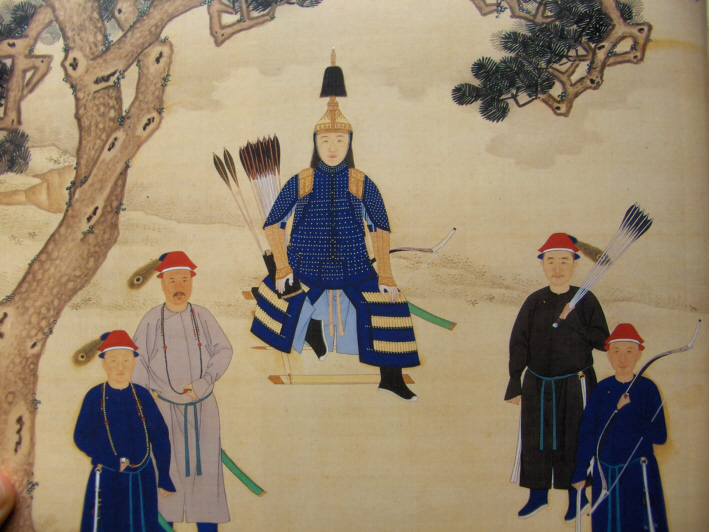
The Kangxi Emperor in ceremonial armor, armed with bow and arrows, and surrounded by bodyguards

The main army of the Qing Empire, the Eight Banners Army, was in decline under the Kangxi Emperor. It was smaller than it had been at its peak under Hong Taiji and in the early reign of the Shunzhi Emperor; however, it was larger than in the Yongzheng and Qianlong emperors' reigns. In addition, the Green Standard Army was still powerful with generals such as Tuhai, Fei Yanggu, Zhang Yong, Zhou Peigong, Shi Lang, Mu Zhan, Shun Shike and Wang Jingbao.

The main reason for this decline was a change in system between the Kangxi and Qianlong emperors' reigns. The Kangxi Emperor continued using the traditional military system implemented by his predecessors, which was more efficient and stricter. According to the system, a commander who returned from a battle alone (with all his men dead) would be put to death, and likewise for a foot soldier. This was meant to motivate both commanders and soldiers alike to fight valiantly in war because there was no benefit for the sole survivor in a battle.

=== Revolt of the Three Feudatories ===
After the Qing takeover of China in 1644, large parts of the south and west were given as fiefs to three Ming generals who aided the Qing; in 1673 the three feudatories were controlled by Wu Sangui, Geng Jingzhong, and Shang Zhixin. Going against the advice of most of his advisors, Kangxi attempted to force the feudal princes to give up their lands and retire to Manchuria, sparking a rebellion that lasted eight years. For years afterwards Kangxi ruminated on his mistakes and blamed himself in part for the loss of life during the revolt.

Wu Sangui's forces overran most of southwest China and he tried to ally himself with local generals such as Wang Fuchen. The Kangxi Emperor employed generals including Zhou Peigong and Tuhai to suppress the rebellion, and also granted clemency to common people caught up in the war. He intended to personally lead the armies to crush the rebels but his subjects advised him against it. The Kangxi Emperor used mainly Han Chinese Green Standard Army soldiers to crush the rebels while the Manchu Banners took a backseat. The revolt ended with victory for Qing forces in 1681.

=== Taiwan ===
In 1683, the naval forces of the Ming loyalists on Taiwan—organized under the Zheng dynasty as the Kingdom of Tungning—were defeated off Penghu by 300-odd ships under the Qing admiral Shi Lang. Koxinga's grandson Zheng Keshuang surrendered Tungning a few days later and Taiwan became part of the Qing Empire. Zheng Keshuang moved to Beijing, joined the Qing nobility as the "Duke Haicheng" (海澄公), and was inducted into the Eight Banners as a member of the Han Plain Red Banner. His soldiers—including the rattan-shield troops (藤牌營, tengpaiying)—were similarly entered into the Eight Banners, notably serving against Russian Cossacks at Albazin.

A score of Ming princes had joined the Zheng dynasty on Taiwan, including Prince Zhu Shugui of Ningjing and Prince Honghuan (朱弘桓), the son of Zhu Yihai. The Qing sent most of the 17 Ming princes still living on Taiwan back to mainland China, where they spent the rest of their lives. The Prince of Ningjing and his five concubines, however, committed suicide rather than submit to capture. Their palace was used as Shi Lang's headquarters in 1683, but he memorialized the emperor to convert it into a Mazu temple as a propaganda measure in quieting remaining resistance on Taiwan. The emperor approved its dedication as the Grand Matsu Temple the next year and, honoring the goddess Mazu for her supposed assistance during the Qing invasion, promoted her to "Empress of Heaven" (天后 Tianhou) from her previous status as a "heavenly consort" (天妃 Tianfei). Belief in Mazu remains so widespread on Taiwan that her annual celebrations can gather hundreds of thousands of people; she is sometimes even syncretized with Guanyin and the Virgin Mary.

The end of the rebel stronghold and capture of the Ming princes allowed the Kangxi Emperor to relax the Sea Ban and permit resettlement of the Fujian and Guangdong coasts. The financial and other incentives to new settlers particularly drew the Hakka, who would have continuous low-level conflict with the returning Punti people for the next few centuries.

=== Russia ===
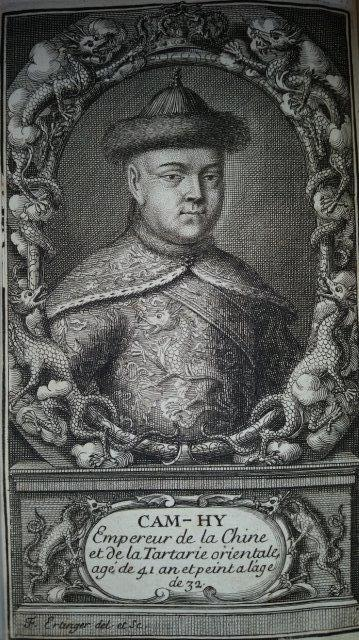
Kangxi Emperor at 32 (from le Comte's Nouveaux Memoires, 1696)

In the 1650s, the Qing Empire engaged the Tsardom of Russia in a series of border conflicts along the Amur River region, which concluded with the Qing gaining control of the area after the Siege of Albazin.

The Russians invaded the northern frontier again in the 1680s. A series of battles. In 1685, the Qing used former Ming loyalist Han Chinese naval specialists who had served under the Zheng family in Taiwan in the siege of Albazin. Former Ming loyalist Han Chinese troops who had served under Zheng Chenggong and who specialized at fighting with rattan shields and swords (Tengpaiying, 藤牌营) were recommended to Kangxi to reinforce Albazin against the Russians. Kangxi was impressed by a demonstration of their techniques and ordered 500 of them to defend Albazin, under Ho Yu, a former Koxinga follower, and Lin Hsing-chu, a former General of Wu Sangui. These rattan shield troops did not suffer a single casualty when they defeated and cut down Russian forces traveling by rafts on the river, only using the rattan shields and swords while fighting naked.

Negotiations culminated in the Treaty of Nerchinsk of 1689, by which a border was agreed between Russia and China.

=== Mongolia ===
The Inner Mongolian Chahar leader Ligdan Khan, a descendant of Genghis Khan, opposed and fought against the Qing until he died of smallpox in 1634. Thereafter, the Inner Mongols under his son Ejei Khan surrendered to the Qing and he was given the title of Prince (Qin Wang, 親王). The Inner Mongolian nobility now became closely tied to the Qing royal family and intermarried with them extensively. Ejei Khan died in 1661 and was succeeded by his brother Abunai. After Abunai showed disaffection with Manchu Qing rule, he was placed under house arrest in 1669 in Shenyang and the Kangxi Emperor gave his title to his son Borni.

Abunai bided his time then, with his brother Lubuzung, revolted against the Qing in 1675 during the Revolt of the Three Feudatories, with 3,000 Chahar Mongol followers joining in on the revolt. The revolt was put down within two months, the Qing defeating the rebels in battle on 20 April 1675, killing Abunai and all his followers. Their title was abolished, all Chahar Mongol royal males were executed even if they were born to Manchu Qing princesses, and all Chahar Mongol royal females were sold into slavery except the Manchu Qing princesses. The Chahar Mongols were then put under the direct control of the Qing Emperor unlike the other Inner Mongol leagues which maintained their autonomy.

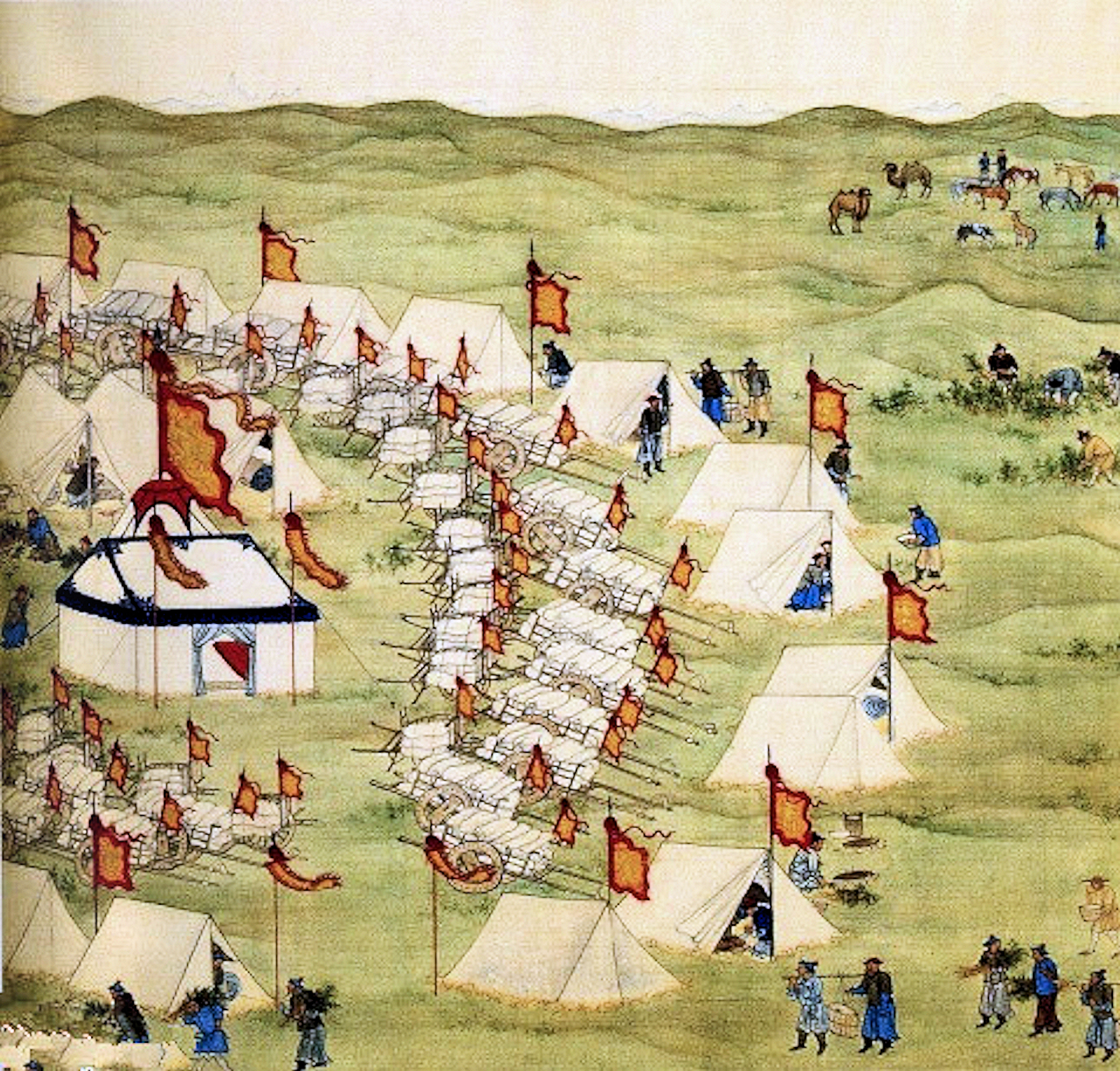
Emperor Kangxi's camp on Kerulen during the campaign of 1696

The Outer Khalkha Mongols had preserved their independence, and only paid tribute to the Qing Empire. However, a conflict between the houses of Jasagtu Khan and Tösheetü Khan led to a dispute between the Khalkha and the Dzungars over the influence of Tibetan Buddhism. In 1688, the Dzungar chief, Galdan Boshugtu Khan, attacked the Khalkha from the west and invaded their territory. The Khalkha royal families and the first Jebtsundamba Khutuktu crossed the Gobi Desert and sought help from the Qing Empire in return for submission to Qing authority. In 1690, the Dzungars and Qing forces clashed at the Battle of Ulan Butung in Inner Mongolia, in which the Qing eventually emerged as the victor.

In 1696 and 1697 the Kangxi Emperor personally led campaigns against the Dzungars in the early Dzungar–Qing War. The western section of the Qing army defeated Galdan's forces at the Battle of Jao Modo and Galdan died in the following year.

=== Manchu Hoifan and Ula rebellion against the Qing ===
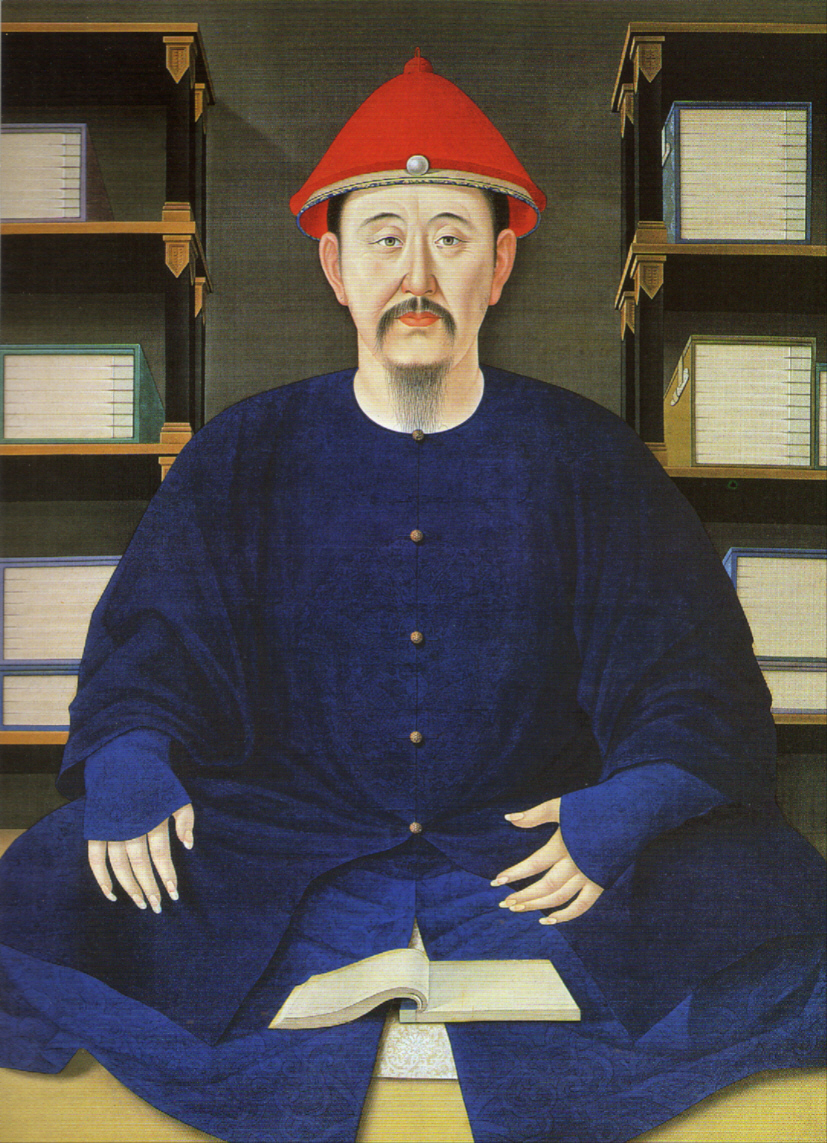
The Kangxi Emperor at the age of 45, painted in 1699

In 1700, some 20,000 Qiqihar Xibe were resettled in Guisui, modern Inner Mongolia, and 36,000 Songyuan Xibe were resettled in Shenyang, Liaoning. The relocation of the Xibe from Qiqihar is believed by Liliya M. Gorelova to be linked to the Qing's annihilation of the Manchu clan Hoifan (Hoifa) in 1697 and the Manchu tribe Ula in 1703 after they rebelled against the Qing; both Hoifan and Ula were wiped out.

=== Tibet ===
In 1701, the Kangxi Emperor ordered the reconquest of Kangding and other border towns in western Sichuan that had been taken by the Tibetans. The Manchu forces stormed Dartsedo and secured the border with Tibet and the lucrative tea-horse trade.

The Tibetan desi (regent) Sangye Gyatso concealed the death of the 5th Dalai Lama in 1682, and only informed the emperor in 1697. He moreover kept relations with Dzungar enemies of the Qing. All this evoked the great displeasure of the Kangxi Emperor. Eventually Sangye Gyatso was toppled and killed by the Khoshut ruler Lhazang Khan in 1705. As a reward for ridding him of his old enemy the Dalai Lama, the Kangxi Emperor appointed Lhazang Khan Regent of Tibet (翊法恭順汗; Yìfǎ Gōngshùn Hán; 'Buddhism Respecting', 'Deferential Khan'). The Dzungar Khanate, a confederation of Oirat tribes based in parts of what is now Xinjiang, continued to threaten the Qing Empire and invaded Tibet in 1717. They took control of Lhasa with a 6,000 strong army and killed Lhazang Khan. The Dzungars held on to the city for three years and at the Battle of the Salween River defeated a Qing army sent to the region in 1718. The Qing did not take control of Lhasa until 1720, when the Kangxi Emperor sent a larger expedition force there to defeat the Dzungars.

=== Muslims ===
The Kangxi Emperor incited anti-Muslim sentiment among the Mongols of Qinghai (Kokonor) in order to gain support against the Dzungar Oirat Mongol leader Galdan. Kangxi claimed that Chinese Muslims inside China such as Turkic Muslims in Qinghai were plotting with Galdan, who he falsely claimed converted to Islam. Kangxi falsely claimed that Galdan had spurned and turned his back on Buddhism and the Dalai Lama and that he was plotting to install a Muslim as ruler of China after invading it in a conspiracy with Chinese Muslims. Kangxi also distrusted Muslims of Turfan and Hami.

=== Chinese nobility ===
The Kangxi Emperor granted the title of Wujing Boshi (五經博士; Wǔjīng Bóshì) to the descendants of Shao Yong, Zhu Xi, Zhuansun Shi, Ran family (Ran Qiu, Ran Geng, Ran Yong), Bu Shang, Yan Yan (disciple of Confucius), and the Duke of Zhou's offspring.

== Economic achievements ==
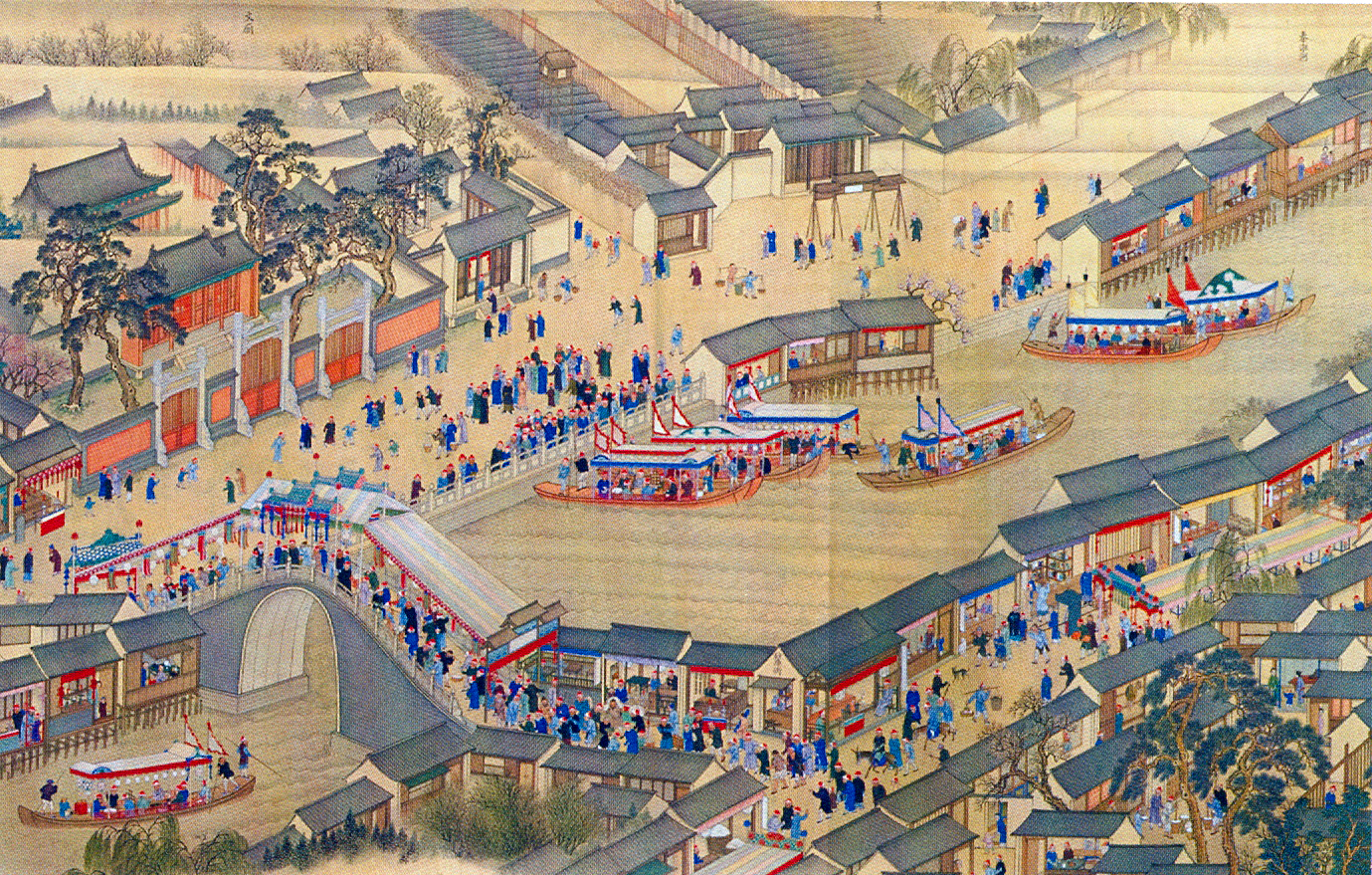
The Kangxi Emperor returning to Beijing after a southern inspection tour in 1689

The contents of the national treasury during the Kangxi Emperor's reign were:

1668 (7th year of Kangxi): 14,930,000 taels
1692: 27,385,631 taels
1702–1709: approximately 50,000,000 taels with little variation during this period
1710: 45,880,000 taels
1718: 44,319,033 taels
1720: 39,317,103 taels
1721 (60th year of Kangxi, second last of his reign): 32,622,421 taels

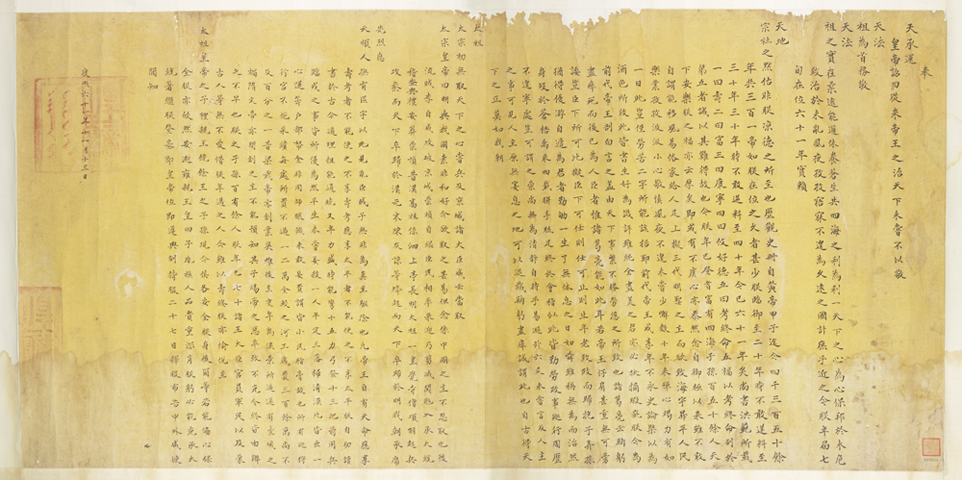
The Kangxi Emperor's Last Will and Testament

The reasons for the declining trend in the later years of the Kangxi Emperor's reign were a huge expenditure on military campaigns and an increase in corruption. To fix the problem, the Kangxi Emperor gave Prince Yong (the future Yongzheng Emperor) advice on how to make the economy more efficient.

== Cultural achievements ==
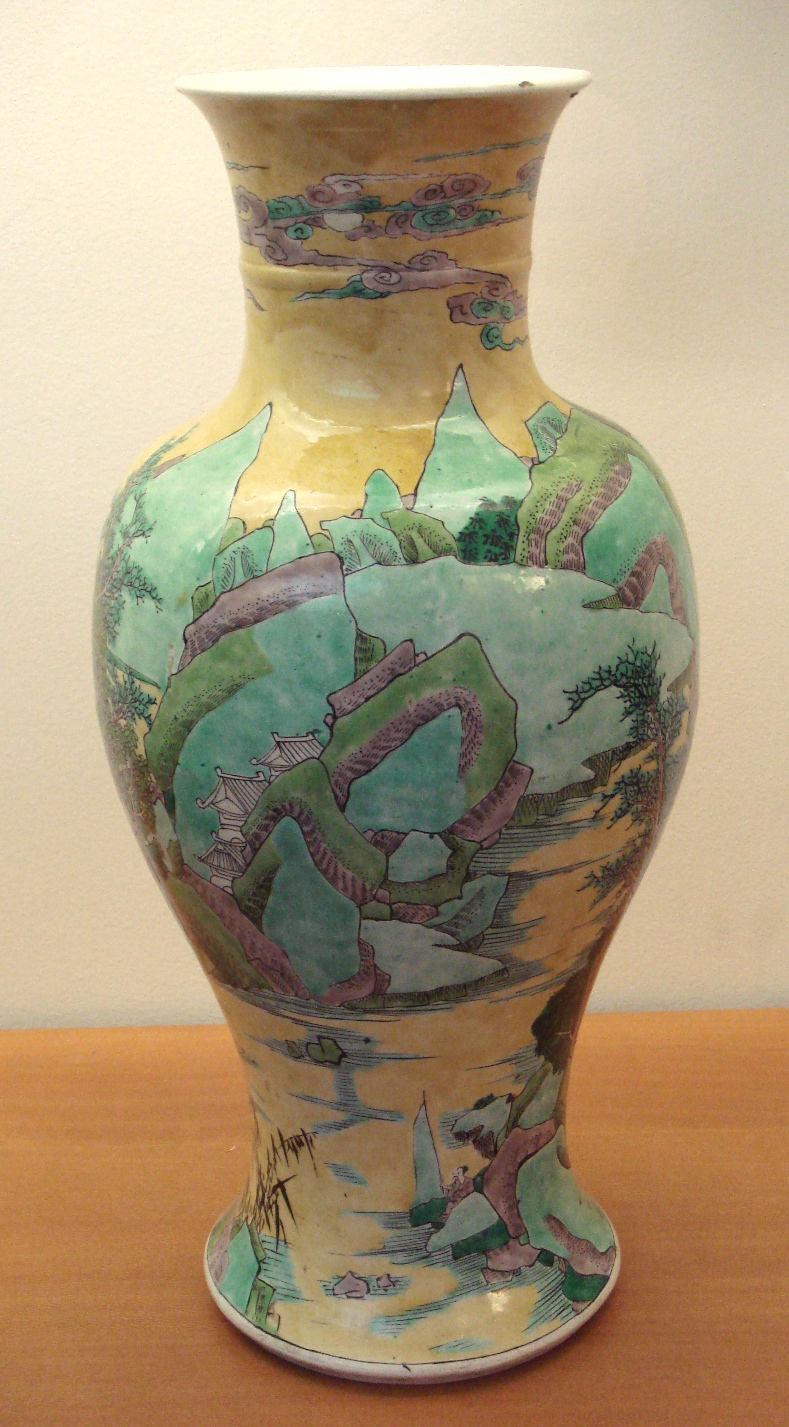
A vase from the early Kangxi period (Guimet Museum)

During his reign, the Kangxi Emperor ordered the compilation of a dictionary of Chinese characters, which became known as the Kangxi Dictionary. This was seen as an attempt by the emperor to gain support from the Han Chinese scholar-bureaucrats, as many of them initially refused to serve him and remained loyal to the Ming dynasty. However, by persuading the scholars to work on the dictionary without asking them to formally serve the Qing imperial court, the Kangxi Emperor led them to gradually taking on greater responsibilities until they were assuming the duties of state officials.

In 1700, on the Kangxi Emperor's order, the compilation of a vast encyclopedia known as the Complete Classics Collection of Ancient China (completed during the reign of his successor Yongzheng), and a compilation of Tang poetry, the Complete Tang Poems.

The Kangxi Emperor also was interested in Western technology and wanted to import them to China. This was done through Jesuit missionaries, such as Ferdinand Verbiest, whom the Kangxi Emperor frequently summoned for meetings, or Karel Slavíček, who made the first precise map of Beijing on the emperor's order.

From 1711 to 1723, Matteo Ripa, an Italian priest sent to China by the Congregation for the Evangelization of Peoples, worked as a painter and copper-engraver at the Qing court. In 1723, he returned to Naples from China with four young Chinese Christians, in order to groom them to become priests and send them back to China as missionaries. This marked the beginning of the Collegio dei Cinesi, sanctioned by Pope Clement XII to help the evangelization of Christianity in China. This Chinese Institute was the first school of Sinology in Europe, which would later develop to become the Istituto Orientale and the present day Naples Eastern University.

The Kangxi Emperor was also the first Chinese emperor to play a western musical instrument. Thomas Pereira taught him how to play the harpsichord, and he employed Karel Slavíček as court musician. Slavíček was playing Spinet; later the emperor would play on it himself. China's famed blue and white porcelain probably reached its zenith during the Kangxi Emperor's reign.

== Christianity ==
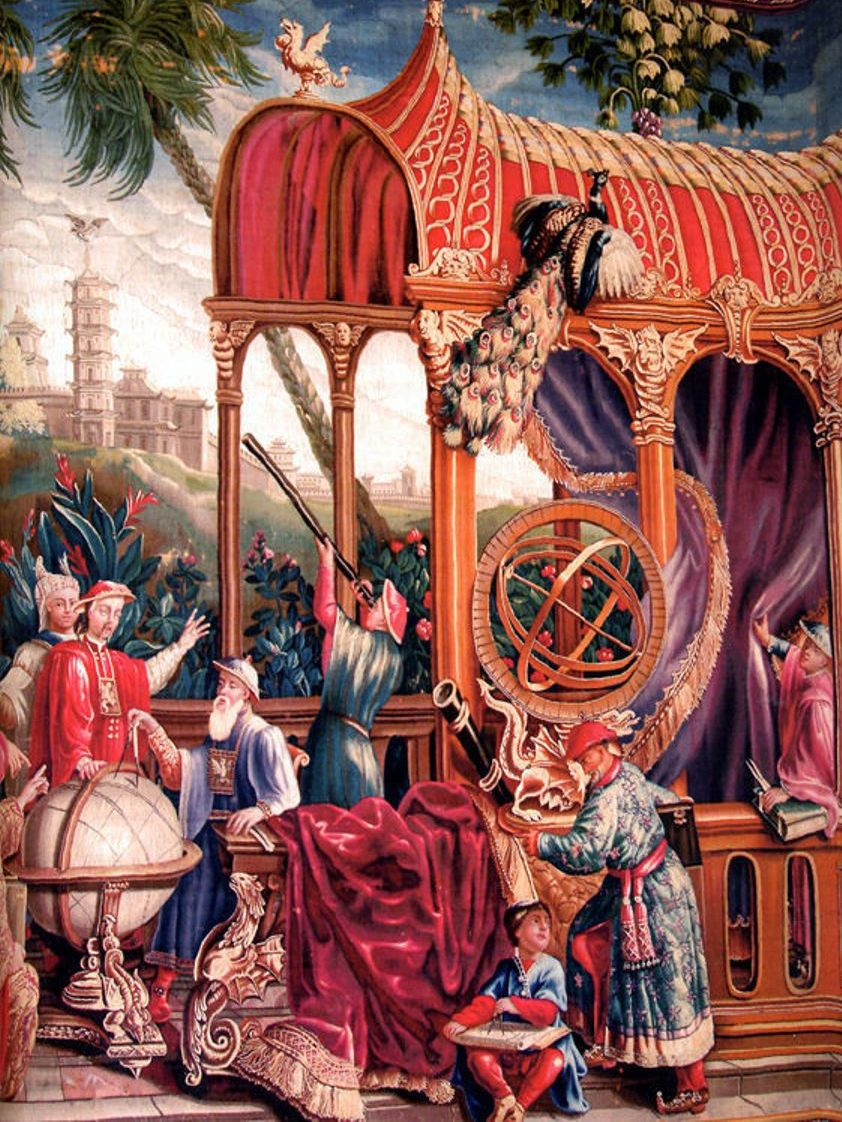
Jesuit astronomers of the Jesuit China missions, with the Kangxi Emperor (Beauvais, 1690–1705)

In the early decades of the Kangxi Emperor's reign, Jesuits played a large role in the imperial court. With their knowledge of astronomy, they ran the imperial observatory. Jean-François Gerbillon and Thomas Pereira served as translators for the negotiations of the Treaty of Nerchinsk. The Kangxi Emperor was grateful to the Jesuits for their contributions, the many languages they could interpret, and the innovations they offered his military in gun manufacturing and artillery, the latter of which enabled the Qing Empire to conquer the Kingdom of Tungning.

The Kangxi Emperor was also fond of the Jesuits' respectful and unobtrusive manner; they spoke the Chinese language well, and wore the silk robes of the elite. In 1692, when Pereira requested tolerance for Christianity, the Kangxi Emperor was willing to oblige, and issued the Edict of Toleration, which recognized Catholicism, barred attacks on their churches, and legalized their missions and the practice of Christianity by the Chinese people.

However, controversy arose over whether Chinese Christians could still take part in traditional Confucian ceremonies and ancestor worship, with the Jesuits arguing for tolerance and the Dominicans taking a hard-line against foreign "idolatry". The Dominican position won the support of Pope Clement XI, who in 1705 sent Charles-Thomas Maillard de Tournon as his representative to the Kangxi Emperor, to communicate the ban on Chinese rites. Through de Tournon, the Pope insisted on sending his own representative to Beijing to oversee Jesuit missionaries in China. Kangxi refused, wanting to keep missionary activities in China under his final oversight, managed by one of the Jesuits who had been living in Beijing for years.

On 19 March 1715, Pope Clement XI issued the papal bull Ex illa die, which officially condemned Chinese rites. In response, the Kangxi Emperor officially forbade Christian missions in China, as they were "causing trouble".

== Succession disputes ==
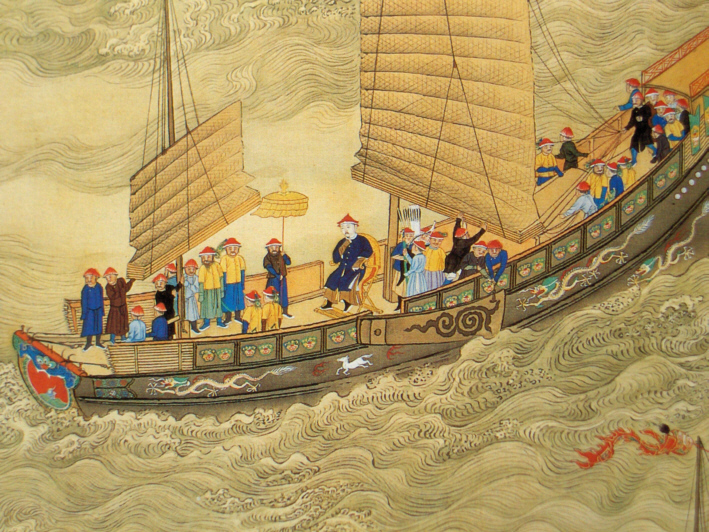
The Kangxi Emperor on a tour, seated prominently on the deck of a junk

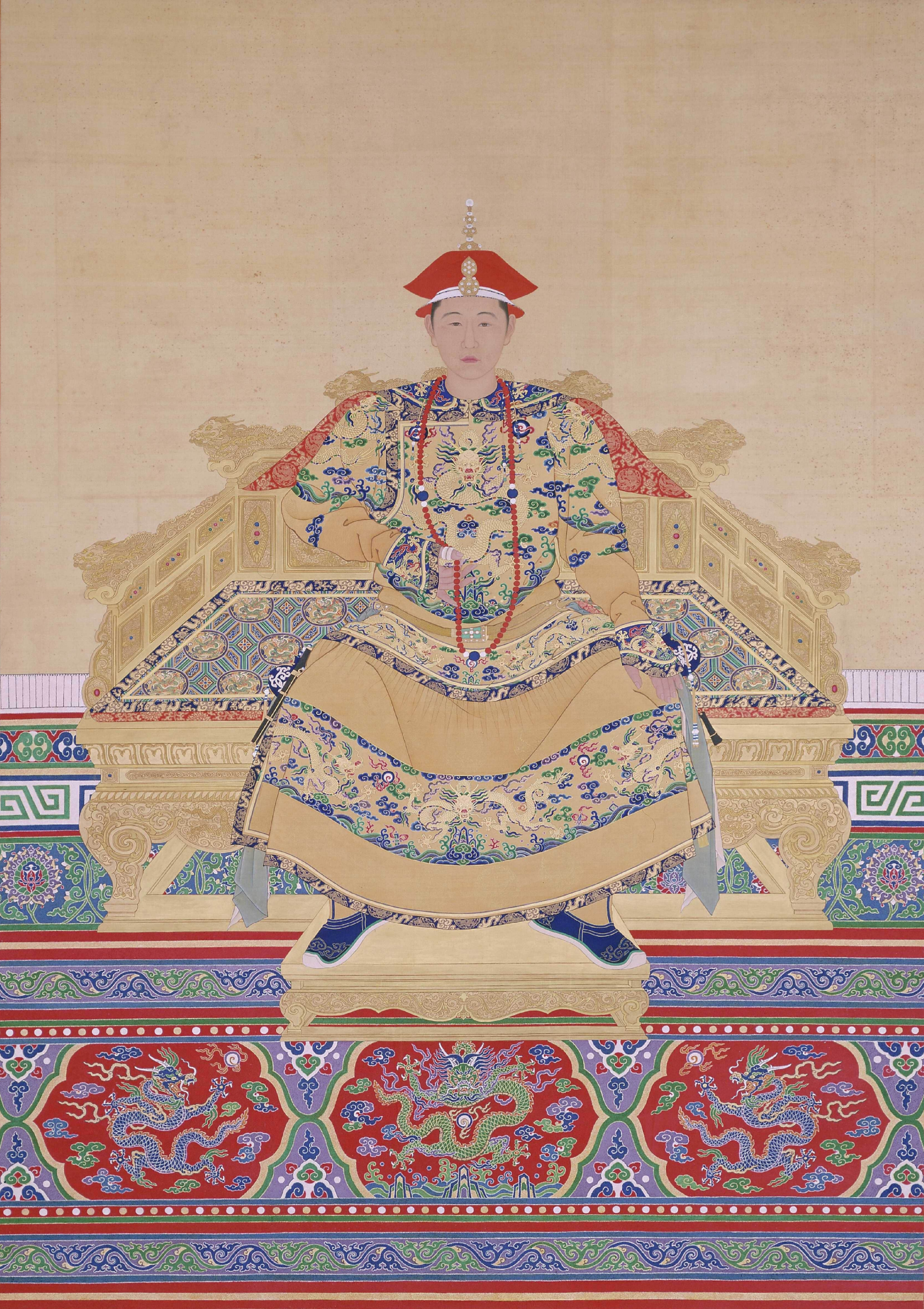
Young Kangxi

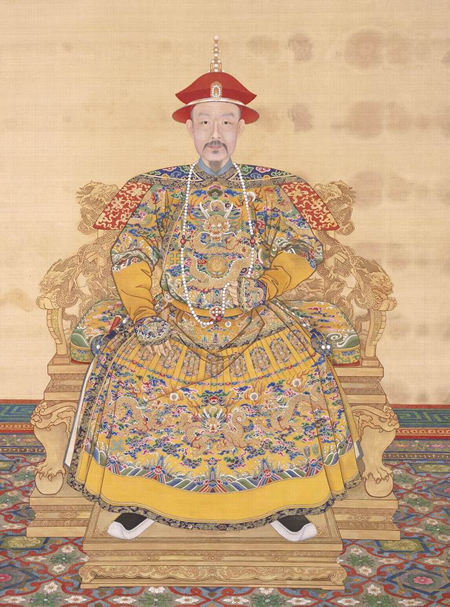
Middle-aged Kangxi

A prolonged struggle between various princes emerged during the Kangxi Emperor's reign over who should inherit the throne – the Nine Lords' War (九子奪嫡).

In 1674 the Kangxi Emperor's first spouse, Empress Xiaochengren, died while giving birth to his second surviving son Yinreng, who at the age of two was named crown prince – a Han Chinese custom, to ensure stability during a time of chaos in the south. Although the Kangxi Emperor left the education of several of his sons to others, he personally oversaw the upbringing of Yinreng, grooming him to be a perfect successor. Yinreng was tutored by the mandarin Wang Shan, who remained devoted to him, and spent the later years of his life trying to persuade the Kangxi Emperor to restore Yinreng as the crown prince.

Yinreng proved to be unworthy of the succession despite his father showing favoritism towards him. He was said to have beaten and killed his subordinates, and was alleged to have had sexual relations with one of his father's concubines, which was deemed incest and a capital offence. Yinreng also purchased young children from Jiangsu to satisfy his pedophiliac pleasure. In addition, Yinreng's supporters, led by Songgotu, gradually formed a "Crown Prince Party" (太子黨), that aimed to help Yinreng get the throne as soon as possible, even if it meant using unlawful methods.

Over the years, the Kangxi Emperor kept constant watch over Yinreng and became aware of his son's many flaws, while their relationship gradually deteriorated. In 1707, the emperor decided that he could no longer tolerate Yinreng's behavior, which he partially mentioned in the imperial edict as "never obeying ancestors' virtues, never obliged to my order, only doing inhumanity and devilry, only showing maliciousness and lust", and decided to strip Yinreng of his position as crown prince. The Kangxi Emperor placed his oldest surviving son, Yinzhi, in charge of overseeing Yinreng's house arrest. Yinzhi, an unfavored Shu son, knowing he had no chance of being selected, recommended the eighth prince, Yinsi, and requested his father to order Yinreng's execution. The Kangxi Emperor was enraged and stripped Yinzhi of his titles. The emperor then commanded his subjects to cease debating the succession issue, but despite this and attempts to reduce rumours and speculation as to who the new crown prince might be, the imperial court's daily activities were disrupted. Yinzhi's actions caused the Kangxi Emperor to suspect that Yinreng might have been framed, so he restored Yinreng as crown prince in 1709, with the support of the 4th and 13th princes, and on the excuse that Yinreng had previously acted under the influence of mental illness.

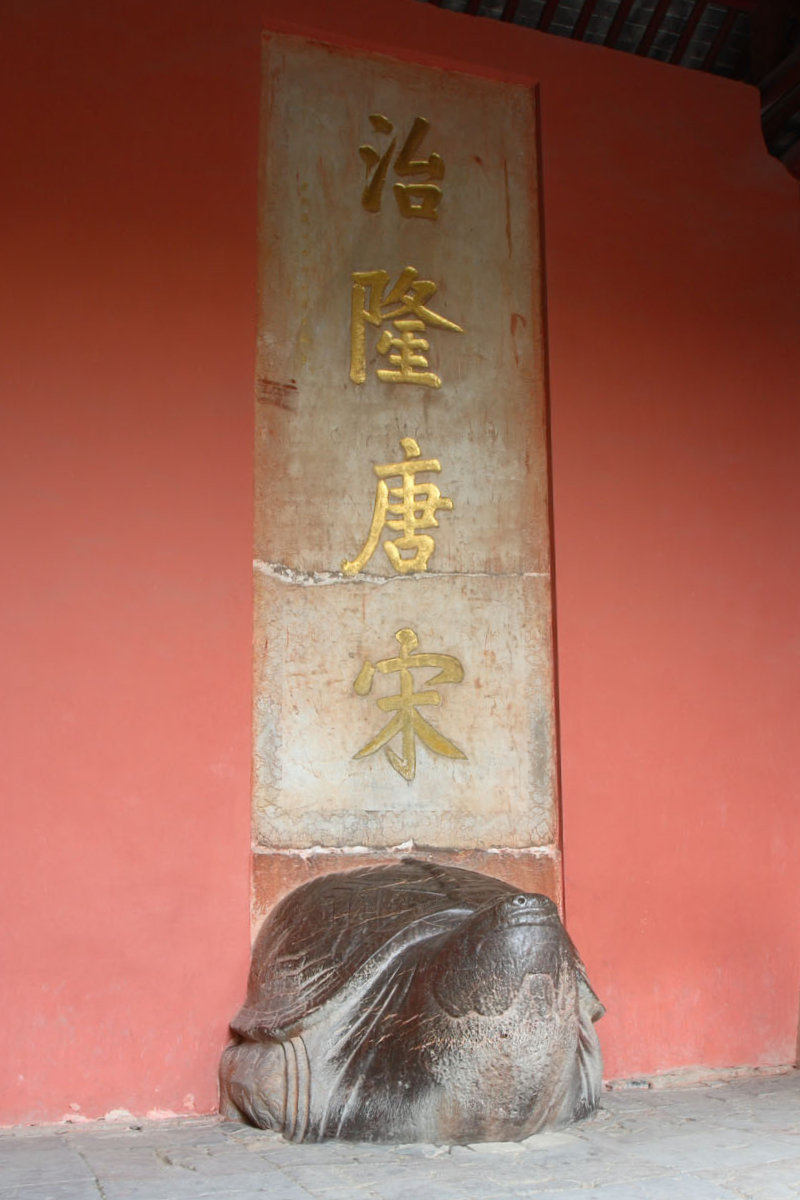
A turtle-based stele with the Kangxi Emperor's inscription, erected in 1699 at the Nanjing mausoleum of the Hongwu Emperor, honouring the founder of the preceding Ming dynasty as surpassing the founders of the Tang and Song dynasties.

In 1712, during the Kangxi Emperor's last inspection tour of the south, Yinreng, who was put in charge of state affairs during his father's absence, tried to vie for power again with his supporters. He allowed an attempt at forcing the Kangxi Emperor to abdicate when his father returned to Beijing. However, the emperor received news of the planned coup d'etat, and was so angry that he deposed Yinreng and placed him under house arrest again. After the incident, the emperor announced that he would not appoint any of his sons as crown prince for the remainder of his reign. He stated that he would place his Imperial Valedictory Will inside a box in the Palace of Heavenly Purity, which would only be opened after his death.

Seeing that Yinreng was completely disavowed, Yinsi and some other princes turned to support the 14th prince, Yinti, while the 13th prince supported Yinzhen. They formed the so-called "Eighth Lord Party" (八爺黨) and "Fourth Lord Party" (四爺黨).

== Death and succession ==
Following the deposition of the crown prince, the Kangxi Emperor implemented groundbreaking changes in the political landscape. The 13th prince, Yinxiang, was placed under house arrest as well for cooperating with Yinreng. The eighth prince Yinsi was stripped of all his titles and only had them restored years later. The 14th prince Yinti, whom many considered to be the most likely candidate to succeed the Kangxi Emperor, was sent on a military campaign during the political conflict. Yinsi, along with the ninth and tenth princes, Yintang and Yin'e, pledged their support to Yinti.

According to official records, on the evening of 20 December 1722, just before his death, the Kangxi Emperor called seven of his sons to assemble at his bedside. They were the third, fourth, eighth, ninth, tenth, sixteenth and seventeenth princes. After the Kangxi Emperor died, Longkodo announced that the emperor had selected the fourth prince, Yinzhen, as the new emperor. Yinzhen ascended to the throne and became known as the Yongzheng Emperor. The Kangxi Emperor was entombed at the Eastern Tombs in Zunhua, Hebei.

The Kangxi Emperor was initially conferred the posthumous name "Emperor Hetian Hongyun Wenwu Ruizhe Gongjian Kuanyu Xiaojing Chengxin Gongde Dacheng Ren" (合天弘運文武睿哲恭儉寬裕孝敬誠信功德大成仁皇帝) shortly after his death. (Note: Manchu: Gosin hūwangdi ᡤᠣᠰᡳᠨ ᡥᡡᠸᠠᠩᡩᡳ) This appellation was later extended to "Emperor Hetian Hongyun Wenwu Ruizhe Gongjian Kuanyu Xiaojing Chengxin Zhonghe Gongde Dacheng Ren" (合天弘運文武睿哲恭儉寬裕孝敬誠信中和功德大成仁皇帝) in the first year of the reign of the Qianlong Emperor.

There is a historical dispute over the succession. Until this day it is debated, whether Kangxi chose Yinti (or Yinzheng) as his heir, but Yinzhen forged the will in his own favour, or Yinzhen ascended legitimately.

== Personality and achievements ==
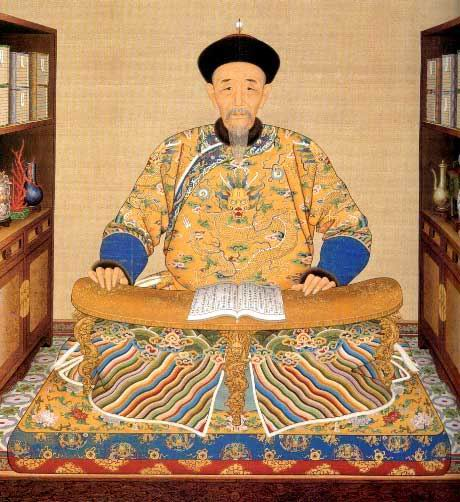
Portrait of the old Kangxi Emperor in court dress

The Kangxi Emperor was a great consolidator of the Qing dynasty. The transition from the Ming dynasty to the Qing was a cataclysm whose central event was the fall of the capital Beijing to the peasant rebels led by Li Zicheng, then to the Manchus in 1644, and the installation of the five-year-old Shunzhi Emperor on their throne. By 1661, when the Shunzhi Emperor died and was succeeded by the Kangxi Emperor, the Qing conquest of China proper was almost complete. Leading Manchus were already using Chinese institutions and mastering Confucian ideology, while maintaining Manchu culture among themselves. The Kangxi Emperor completed the conquest, suppressed all significant military threats and revived the central government system inherited from the Ming with important modifications.

The Kangxi Emperor was a workaholic, rising early and retiring late, reading and responding to numerous memorials every day, conferring with his councilors and giving audiences – and this was in normal times; in wartime, he might be reading memorials from the warfront until after midnight or even, as with the Dzungar conflict, away on campaign in person.

The French Jesuit and mathematician Louis Le Comte painted a portrait of the emperor he met around 1688: "The emperor seemed to me to be above average height, fatter than the ordinary people who pride themselves in Europe on being well built, but a little less than a Chinese would like to appear. His face is full and marked by smallpox. He has a broad forehead, a nose and small eyes in the Chinese manner, a beautiful mouth and a very pleasant lower face. Finally, although there is nothing very grand about his appearance, he looks good and there is something in his manners and in all his actions that smacks of the master and sets him apart".

The Kangxi Emperor devised a system of communication that circumvented the scholar-bureaucrats, who had a tendency to usurp the power of the emperor. This Palace Memorial System involved the transfer of secret messages between him and trusted officials in the provinces, where the messages were contained in locked boxes that only he and the official had access to. This started as a system for receiving uncensored extreme-weather reports, which the emperor regarded as divine comments on his rule. However, it soon evolved into a general-purpose secret "news channel." Out of this emerged a Grand Council, which dealt with extraordinary, especially military, events. The council was chaired by the emperor and manned by his more elevated Han Chinese and Manchu household staff. From this council, the mandarin civil servants were excluded – they were left only with routine administration.

The Kangxi Emperor managed to woo the Confucian intelligentsia into co-operating with the Qing government, despite their deep reservations about Manchu rule and loyalty to the Ming. He appealed to this very sense of Confucian values, for instance, by issuing the Sacred Edict in 1670. He encouraged Confucian learning and made sure that the civil service examinations were held every three years even during times of stress. When some scholars, out of loyalty to the Ming, refused to take the exams, he hit upon the expedient of a special exam to be taken by nomination. He personally sponsored the writing of the Ming Official History, the Kangxi Dictionary, a phrase-dictionary, a vast encyclopedia and an even vaster compilation of Chinese literature. To promote his image as a "sage ruler," he appointed Manchu and Chinese tutors with whom he studied the Confucian classics and worked intensively on Chinese calligraphy.

In the one military campaign in which he actively participated, against the Dzungar Mongols, the Kangxi Emperor showed himself an effective military commander. According to Finer, the emperor's own written reflections allow one to experience "how intimate and caring was his communion with the rank-and-file, how discriminating and yet masterful his relationship with his generals".

As a result of the scaling down of hostilities as peace returned to China after the Manchu conquest, and also as a result of the ensuing rapid increase of population, land cultivation and therefore tax revenues based on agriculture, the Kangxi Emperor was able first to make tax remissions, then in 1712 to freeze the land tax and corvée altogether, without embarrassing the state treasury (although the dynasty eventually suffered from this fiscal policy, as this preserved tax rates in perpetuity, preventing later emperors from adjusting the fiscal system and hindering attempts at modernisation).

== Family ==
- Empress Xiaochengren (孝誠仁皇后), of the Hešeri clan (赫舍里氏; 3 February 1654 – 6 June 1674)
  - Chenghu (承祜; 4 January 1670 – 3 March 1672), second son
  - Yunreng (允礽), Prince Limi of the First Rank (理密親王; 6 June 1674 – 27 January 1725), seventh (second) son
- Empress Xiaozhaoren (孝昭仁皇后), of the Niohuru clan (鈕祜祿氏; 1653 – 18 March 1678) (Note: The Kangxi Emperor's second cousin and elder sister of Noble Consort Wenxi.)
- Empress Xiaoyiren (孝懿仁皇后), of the Tunggiya clan (佟佳氏; d. 24 August 1689) (Note: The Kangxi Emperor's first cousin and elder sister of Imperial Noble Consort Quehui.)
  - Eighth daughter (13 July 1683 – 6 August 1683)
  - Miscarriage (August 1689)
- Empress Xiaogongren (孝恭仁皇后), of the Uya clan (烏雅氏; 28 April 1660 – 25 June 1723)
  - Yinzhen (胤禛), the Yongzheng Emperor (雍正帝; 13 December 1678 – 8 October 1735), 11th (fourth) son
  - Yinzuo (胤祚; 5 March 1680 – 15 June 1685), 14th (sixth) son
  - Seventh daughter (5 July 1682 – September 1682)
  - Princess Wenxian of the First Rank (固倫溫憲公主; 10 November 1683 – August/September 1702), ninth daughter
    - Married Shun'anyan (舜安顏; d. 1724), of the Tunggiya clan, in October/November 1700
  - 12th daughter (14 June 1686 – February/March 1697)
  - Yunti (允禵), Prince Xunqin of the Second Rank (恂勤郡王; 10 February 1688 – 16 February 1755), 23rd (14th) son
- Imperial Noble Consort Quehui (愨惠皇貴妃), of the Tunggiya clan (佟佳氏; September/October 1668 – 24 April 1743) (Note: The Kangxi Emperor's first cousin and younger sister of Empress Xiaoyiren.)
- Imperial Noble Consort Jingmin (敬敏皇貴妃), of the Janggiya clan (章佳氏; d. 20 August 1699)
  - Yinxiang (胤祥), Prince Yixian of the First Rank (怡賢親王; 16 November 1686 – 18 June 1730), 22nd (13th) son
  - Princess Wenke of the Second Rank (和碩溫恪公主; 31 December 1687 – 27 July 1709), 13th daughter
    - Married Cangjin (蒼津), of the Onnigud Borjigin clan, in August/September 1706
  - Princess Dunke of the Second Rank (和碩敦恪公主; 3 February 1691 – 2 January 1710), 15th daughter
    - Married Dorji (多爾濟; d. 1720), of the Khorchin Borjigin clan, in January/February 1709, and had issue (one daughter)
- Imperial Noble Consort Dunyi (惇怡皇貴妃), of the Gūwalgiya clan (瓜爾佳氏; 3 December 1683 – 30 April 1768)
  - 18th daughter (17 November 1701 – November 1701)
- Noble Consort Wenxi (溫僖貴妃), of the Niohuru clan (鈕祜祿氏; 14 February 1661 – 19 December 1694) (Note: The Kangxi Emperor's second cousin and younger sister of Empress Xiaozhaoren.)
  - Yun'e (允䄉), Duke of the Second Rank (輔國公; 28 November 1683 – 18 October 1741), 18th (10th) son
  - 11th daughter (24 October 1685 – June/July 1686)
- Consort Hui (慧妃), of the Khorchin Borjigin clan (博爾濟吉特氏; d. 30 May 1670) (Note: The Kangxi Emperor's first cousin-twice-removed.)
- Consort Hui (惠妃), of the Ula-Nara clan (葉赫那拉氏; d. 1 May 1732)
  - Chengqing (承慶; 21 March 1670 – 26 May 1671), third son
  - Yunzhi (允禔), Prince of the Fourth Rank (貝子; 12 March 1672 – 7 January 1735), fifth (first) son
- Consort Yi (宜妃), of the Gorolo clan (郭絡羅氏; 1660 – 2 October 1733), personal name was Nalanzhu (納蘭珠)
  - Yunki (允祺), Prince Hengwen of the First Rank (恆溫親王; 5 January 1680 – 10 July 1732), 13th (fifth) son
  - Yuntang (允禟), Prince of the Fourth Rank (貝子; 17 October 1683 – 22 September 1726), 17th (ninth) son
  - Yinzi (胤禌; 8 June 1685 – 22 August 1696), 20th (11th) son
- Consort Rong (榮妃), of the Magiya clan (馬佳氏; 10 October 1656 – 26 April 1727)
  - Chengrui (承瑞; 5 November 1667 – 10 July 1670), first son
  - Saiyinchahun (賽音察渾; 24 January 1672 – 6 March 1674), fourth son
  - Princess Rongxian of the First Rank (固倫榮憲公主; 20 June 1673 – 29 May 1728), third daughter
    - Married Örgen (烏爾袞; d. 1721), of the Barin Borjigin clan, in June/July 1691, and had issue (one son)
  - Changhua (長華; b. 11 May 1674), sixth son
  - Changsheng (長生; 10 September 1675 – 27 April 1677), eighth son
  - Yunzhi (允祉), Prince Chengyin of the Second Rank (誠隱郡王; 23 March 1677 – 10 July 1732), 10th (third) son
- Consort Ping (平妃), of the Hešeri clan (赫舍里氏; 19 June 1665 – 18 July 1696)
  - Yinji (胤禨; 23 February 1691 – 30 March 1691), 24th son
- Consort Liang (良妃), of the Wei clan (衛氏; 14 February 1662 – 29 December 1711)
  - Yunsi (允禩), Prince Lian of the First Rank (廉親王; 29 March 1681 – 5 October 1726), 16th (eighth) son
- Consort Xuan (宣妃), of the Khorchin Borjigin clan (博爾濟吉特氏; d. 12 September 1736), personal name Chenglian (成蓮) (Note: The Kangxi Emperor's third cousin.)
- Consort Cheng (成妃), of the Daigiya clan (戴佳氏; 24 November 1660 – 18 December 1740)
  - Yunyou (允佑), Prince Chundu of the First Rank (淳度親王; 19 August 1680 – 18 May 1730), 15th (seventh) son
- Consort Shunyimi (順懿密妃), of the Wang clan (王氏; 15 May 1668 – 19 November 1744)
  - Yunxu (允禑), Prince Yuke of the Second Rank (愉恪郡王; 24 December 1693 – 8 March 1731), 25th (15th) son
  - Yunlu (允祿), Prince Zhuangke of the First Rank (莊恪親王; 28 July 1695 – 20 March 1767), 26th (16th) son
  - Yinxie (胤祄; 15 May 1701 – 17 October 1708), 28th (18th) son
- Consort Chunyuqin (純裕勤妃), of the Chen clan (陳氏; d. 12 January 1754)
  - Yunli (允禮), Prince Guoyi of the First Rank (果毅親王; 24 March 1697 – 21 March 1738), 27th (17th) son
- Consort Ding (定妃), of the Wanlioha clan (萬琉哈氏; January/February 1661 – 24 May 1757)
  - Yuntao (允祹), Prince Lüyi of the First Rank (履懿親王; 18 January 1686 – 1 September 1763), 21st (12th) son
- Concubine An (安嬪), of the Li clan (李氏)
- Concubine Jing (敬嬪), of the Wanggiya clan (王佳氏)
- Concubine Duan (端嬪), of the Dong clan (董氏; d. 1702)
  - Second daughter (17 April 1671 – March/April 1673)
- Concubine Xi (僖嬪), of the Hešeri clan (赫舍里氏; d. 31 October 1702)
- Concubine Tong (通嬪), of the Ula-Nara clan (那拉氏; 1664 – 1 August 1744)
  - Princess Chunque of the First Rank (固倫純慤公主; 20 March 1685 – 22 April 1710), 10th daughter
    - Married Ts'ering (策棱; d. 1750), of the Khalkha Borjigin clan, in June/July 1706, and had issue (one son)
- Concubine Xiang (襄嬪), of the Gao clan (高氏; d. 14 August 1746), personal name Zaiyi (在儀)
  - Yinji (胤禝; 25 October 1702 – 28 March 1704), 29th (19th) son
  - 19th daughter (30 March 1703 – February/March 1705)
  - Yunyi (允禕), Prince Jianjing of the Third Rank (簡靖貝勒; 1 September 1706 – 30 June 1755), 30th (20th) son
- Concubine Jin (謹嬪), of the Sehetu clan (色赫圖氏; 2 August 1682 – 23 April 1739)
  - Yunhu (允祜), Prince Gongqin of the Third Rank (恭勤貝勒; 10 January 1712 – 12 February 1744), 32nd (22nd) son
- Concubine Jing (靜嬪), of the Shi clan (石氏; 13 December 1689 – 10 July 1758)
  - Yunci (允祁), Prince Cheng of the Third Rank (誠貝勒; 14 January 1714 – 31 August 1785), 33rd (23rd) son
- Concubine Xi (熙嬪), of the Chen clan (陳氏; April/May 1690 – 1 February 1737)
  - Yunxi (允禧), Prince Shenjing of the Second Rank (慎靖郡王; 27 February 1711 – 26 June 1758), 31st (21st) son
- Concubine Mu (穆嬪), of the Chen clan (陳氏; d. 1727)
  - Yunbi (允秘), Prince Xianke of the First Rank (𫍯恪親王; 5 July 1716 – 3 December 1773), 34th (24th) son
  - Yinyuan (胤禐; 2 March 1718 – March 1718), 35th son
- Noble Lady Yi (伊貴人), of the Yi clan (易氏; d. 1728)
- Noble Lady Bu (布貴人), of the Joogiya clan (兆佳氏; d. 21 February 1717)
  - Princess Duanjing of the Second Rank (和碩端靜公主; 9 June 1674 – March/April 1710), fifth daughter
    - Married Ga'erzang (噶爾臧; 1675–1722), of the Kharchin Ulanghan clan, in November/December 1692, and had issue (one daughter)
- Noble Lady (貴人), of the Nara clan (那拉氏)
  - Wanfu (萬黼; 4 December 1675 – 11 March 1679), ninth son
  - Yinzan (胤禶; 10 April 1679 – 30 April 1680), 12th son
- Noble Lady (貴人), of the Gorolo clan (郭絡羅氏), personal name was Buyinzhu (布音珠)
  - Princess Kejing of the First Rank (固倫恪靖公主; 4 July 1679 – March/April 1735), sixth daughter
    - Married Dondob Dorji (敦多布多爾濟; d. 1743), of the Khalkha Borjigin clan, in December 1697/January 1698, and had issue (three sons)
  - Yinju (胤䄔; 13 September 1683 – 17 July 1684), 19th son
- Noble Lady (貴人), of the Yuan clan (袁氏; d. 25 September 1719)
  - Princess Quejing of the Second Rank (和碩愨靖公主; 16 January 1690 – 1736), 14th daughter
    - Married Sun Chengyun (孫承運; d. 1719), in 1706
- Mistress (格格), of the Zhang clan (張氏)
  - First daughter (23 December 1668 – November 1671)
  - Fourth daughter (16 March 1674 – January/February 1679)
- Mistress (格格), of the Wang clan (王氏)
  - 16th daughter (27 November 1695 – October/November 1707)
- Mistress (格格), of the Liu clan (劉氏)
  - 17th daughter (12 January 1699 – December 1700 or January 1701)
- Mistress (格格), of the Niohuru clan (鈕祜祿氏)
  - 20th daughter (20 November 1708 – January/February 1709)

== In popular culture ==
=== Fiction ===
- The Great Kangxi Emperor (康熙大帝), a historical novel by Eryue He which romanticises the Kangxi Emperor's life.
- The Deer and the Cauldron, a wuxia novel by Jin Yong. In the novel, the Kangxi Emperor and the protagonist, Wei Xiaobao, become close friends in their childhood. Wei Xiaobao helps the emperor consolidate his rule over the Qing Empire and plays an important role in how significant historical events of the Kangxi era unfold.
- Seven Swords Descend from Mount Heaven, a wuxia novel by Liang Yusheng. In the novel, the Kangxi Emperor discovers that his father, the Shunzhi Emperor, has become a monk in a monastery on Mount Wutai. He orders a close aide to kill his father in order to consolidate power, and later attempts to erase evidence of the murder.

== See also ==
- Chinese emperors family tree (late)
- Kangxi Tongbao

== Bibliography and further reading ==
- Cordier, Henri; Pelliot, Paul, eds. (1922). T'oung Pao (通報) or Archives. Vol. XX1. Leiden: E.J. Brill.
- Dennerline, Jerry (2002), "The Shun-chih Reign", in Peterson, Willard J. (ed.), Cambridge History of China, Vol. 9, Part 1: The Ch'ing Dynasty to 1800, Cambridge: Cambridge University Press, pp. 73–119, ISBN 0-521-24334-3.
- Finer, S. E. (1997). The History of Government from the Earliest Times. ISBN 0-19-822904-6 (three-volume set, hardback)
- Bennet Peterson, Barbara (2000). Notable Women of China: Shang Dynasty to the Early Twentieth Century. M.E. Sharpe, Inc.
- Giles, Herbert (1912), China and the Manchus, Cambridge UK: Cambridge University Press
- Gorelova, Liliya M., ed. (2002). Handbook of Oriental Studies. Section 8 Uralic & Central Asian Studies, Manchu Grammar. Vol. Seven Manchu Grammar. Brill Academic Pub. ISBN 9004123075.
- Oxnam, Robert B. (1975), Ruling from Horseback: Manchu Politics in the Oboi Regency, 1661–1669, Chicago and London: University of Chicago Press, ISBN 0-226-64244-5.
- Rawski, Evelyn S. (1998), The Last Emperors: A Social History of Qing Imperial Institutions, Berkeley, Los Angeles, and London: University of California Press, ISBN 0-520-22837-5.
- Rowe, William T. (2009). China's Last Empire: The Great Qing. Cambridge, MA: Harvard University Press. ISBN 9780674036123.
- Spence, Jonathan D. (2002), "The K'ang-hsi Reign", in Peterson, Willard J. (ed.), Cambridge History of China, Vol. 9, Part 1: The Ch'ing Dynasty to 1800, Cambridge, England: Cambridge University Press, pp. 120–82, ISBN 0-521-24334-3.
- Kangxi and Jonathan D. Spence (1975). Emperor of China: Self Portrait of K'ang Hsi. New York: Vintage Books. ISBN 0394714113.
- Ch. 3, "Kangxi's Consolidation," in Jonathan D. Spence, The Search for Modern China (New York: Norton; 3rd, 2013), pp. 48–71.
- Zhao, Gang (January 2006). "Reinventing China Imperial Qing Ideology and the Rise of Modern Chinese National Identity in the Early Twentieth Century". Modern China. 32 (1). Sage Publications: 3–30. doi:10.1177/0097700405282349. JSTOR 20062627. S2CID 144587815.
- Hummel, Arthur W. Sr., ed. (1943). "Hsüan-yeh" . Eminent Chinese of the Ch'ing Period. United States Government Printing Office.

Kangxi Emperor House of Aisin-Gioro Born: 4 May 1654 Died: 20 December 1722
Regnal titles
Preceded by Shunzhi Emperor	Emperor of the Qing dynasty Emperor of China; 1661–1722	Succeeded by Yongzheng Emperor
