= Yunbi =

Qing Chinese prince

Yunbi 允秘
- Prince Xian of the First Rank 和碩諴親王

Prince Xian of the First Rank
- Tenure: 21 February 1733 – 3 December 1773
- Predecessor: peerage created
- Successor: Hongchang
- Born: Aisin Gioro Yinbi (愛新覺羅·胤秘); 5 July 1716; Beijing, Forbidden City
- Died: 3 December 1773 (aged 57); Shuntian Mansion (present day Hebei Province, Beijing)
- Consorts: Lady Uya
- Issue: 4 sons 7 daughters
Names
- Aisin Gioro Yunbi (愛新覺羅·允秘)
Posthumous name
- Prince Xianke of the First Rank (諴恪親王)
- House: Aisin Gioro
- Father: Kangxi Emperor
- Mother: Concubine Mu

Aisin Gioro Yunbi (允秘; 5 July 1716 – 3 December 1773), born Yinbi, formally known by his title as Prince Xian, was an imperial prince of the Qing Dynasty and the 24th surviving son of the Kangxi Emperor.

== Life ==
Yinbi was born on 5 July 1716 to Concubine Mu, Lady Chen (陳氏), a Han Chinese native. Lady Chen died in 1727 and was buried in Jingling tombs. Yinbi was forced to change the first character of his name to "yun".

In the 11th year of Yongzheng, Yunbi was granted the title of Prince Xian of the First Rank by Yongzheng Emperor because of his loyal and studious nature.

朕幼弟允祕，秉心忠厚，賦性和平，素為皇考所鍾愛。數年以來，在宮中讀書，學識亦漸增長，朕心嘉悅，封為諴親王. Our youngest brother Yunbi, cordial and loyal, harmoneous, therefore favoured by the Predecessor. After several years of studying books in palace he presented diligence. We are rejoiced, therefore grant him a title of Prince Xian of the First Rank.

Yunbi successively held official position during Yongzheng era. During his lifetime, Yinbi served as first rank military official (都統) of the Bordered White Banner, Plain White Banner and Plain Yellow Banner.

He died on 3 December 1773 and posthumously named Prince Xianke of the First Rank (諴恪親王).

== Family ==
Primary Consort

- Primary Consort, of the Uya clan (嫡福晉 烏雅氏)
  - First Daughter (24 September 1734 — 13 March 1736)
  - Princess of the Third Rank (4 November 1735 – 31 January 1753), second daughter
    - Married Mazhate Dorji (马札特多尔济) of the Aohan clan (敖漢) in 1750
  - Third Daughter (25 June 1737 — 30 May 1745)
  - Hongchang, Prince Xianmi of the Second Rank (諴密郡王 弘暢; 6 January 1741 – 18 February 1795), first son
  - Fifth Daughter (2 March 1742 – 5 March 1743)
  - Princess of the Third Rank (郡主; b. 3 May 1743), sixth daughter
    - Married Tetongte'e (特通特额) of the Magiya clan in 1760
  - Princess of the Third Rank (郡主; b. 23 October 1745), seventh daughter
    - Married Naxuntegusi (纳逊特古斯) in 1759

Secondary Consort

- Secondary Consort, of the Niohuru clan (側福晉 鈕祜祿氏)
  - Lady of the First Rank (郡君; b. 14 April 1738), fourth daughter
    - Married Banjur (班珠尔) of the Borjigin in 1756
  - Hongkang, Duke of the Fourth Rank (不入八分輔國公 弘康; 12 September 1747 – 23 May 1814), third son
- Secondary Consort, of the Yin clan (側福晉 殷氏)
  - Hongwu, General of the Fourth Rank (奉恩將軍 弘旿; 15 November 1743 – 28 June 1811), second son

Concubine

- Mistress, of the Chen clan (庶福晉 陳氏)
  - Hongchao, General of the Second Rank (輔國將軍 弘超; 3 November 1755 – 19 July 1808), fourth son
- Mistress, of the Wang clan (妾 王氏)
