= Concubine Xiang =

Imperial concubine of Emperor Kangxi

Gao Zaiyi 高在儀
- Concubine Xiang (襄嬪)
- Born: 17th century
- Died: 14 August 1746; Ningshou Palace, Forbidden City, Beijing, Qing Dynasty
- Burial: Jingling tombs, Eastern Qing tombs
- Spouse: Kangxi Emperor
- Issue: Yinji; 19th daughter Yunyi
Posthumous name
- Xiāng pín (襄嬪)
- House: Gao (馬佳氏; by birth); Aisin Gioro (by marriage)
- Father: Gao Tingxiu

Concubine Xiang (襄嬪; died 14 August 1746), personal name Gao Zaiyi (高在儀), was an imperial concubine of Emperor Kangxi of the Manchu-ruled Qing dynasty.

== Life ==
=== Family background ===
Concubine Xiang's personal name was Zaiyi (在儀) and her family, the Gao clan (高氏), belonged to the Plain Blue Banner. Her father was Gao Tingxiu (高廷秀), a calligrapher and painter.

=== Kangxi era ===
It is unknown when Lady Gao was born or when she entered the Forbidden City to become one of Emperor Kangxi wives.

At that times, the rules of the harem system were not established and many women didn't receive an imperial title even though they had children. Lady Gao was one of them. However, women who have given birth to sons for the emperor enjoyed a higher treatment than others. On 25 October 1702, Lady Gao gave birth to the 29th son of emperor, Yinji (胤禝), who would died prematurely in March 1704. Again, on 30 March 1703, she gave birth to the 19th daughter who would also died young, at almost age of 2. Lastly, in 1706 on 1 September, she gave birth to Yunyi (允禕), the only of her children who survived to adulthood and was made a prince. Only Yunyi out of her children was honoured as a prince, Prince Jianjing of the Third Rank (簡靖貝勒).

=== Yongzheng era ===
Kangxi died 20 December 1722 and succeed by his fourth son, Yinzhen (胤禛), enthroned as Yongzheng Emperor (雍正帝). After becoming emperor, Yongzheng started to promote some of his father concubines who have given birth to sons. Lady Gao was honoured as Noble Lady (貴人; chinese: guìrén). When Lady Gao was still a noble lady, she was called by others as The Beautiful Concubine (秀嬪; chinese: Xiù pín).

=== Qianlong era ===
In 1736, Qianlong promoted fourth of his grandfather living consorts, who were staying in Ningshou Palace (宁寿宫). Noble lady Gao was promoted to Concubine (嬪; chinese: pín). In 1746, on 24 August, Concubine Gao passed away at Ningshou Palace. She was posthumously honoured by Qianlong as Concubine Xiang (襄嬪; chinese: Xiāng pín).

== Titles ==
- During the reign of the Kangxi Emperor (r. 1661–1722):
  - Gao Zaiyi (高在儀; from Unknown Date)
  - Mistress (庶妃; Unknown Date)
- During the reign of the Yongzheng Emperor (r. 1722–1735):
  - Noble Lady (貴人; from 1722)
- During the reign of the Qianlong Emperor (r. 1735–1796):
  - Concubine (嬪; from 1736)
  - Concubine Xiang (襄嬪; After August 1746),

== Issues ==
As a Mistress (庶妃):

- Yinji (胤禝; 25 October 1702 – 28 March 1704), 29th (19th) son
- 19th daughter (30 March 1703 – February/March 1705)
- Yunyi (允禕), Prince Jianjing of the Third Rank (簡靖貝勒; 1 September 1706 – 30 June 1755), 30th (20th)

== See also ==
- Royal and noble ranks of the Qing dynasty
- Imperial Chinese harem system
