= Prince Chun (created 1723) =

Prince Chun of the First Rank

Chinese name
- Traditional Chinese: 和碩淳親王
- Simplified Chinese: 和硕淳亲王
Transcriptions
Standard Mandarin
- Hanyu Pinyin: héshuò chún qīnwáng
- Wade–Giles: ho-shuo ch'un ch'in-wang

Manchu name
- Manchu script: ᡥᠣᡧᠣᡳ ᠪᠣᠯᡤᠣ ᠴᡳᠨ ᠸᠠᠩ
- Romanization: hošoi bolgo cin wang

Prince Chun of the First Rank, or simply Prince Chun, was the title of a princely peerage used in China during the Manchu-led Qing dynasty (1644–1912). As the Prince Chun peerage was not awarded "iron-cap" status, this meant that each successive bearer of the title would normally start off with a title downgraded by one rank vis-à-vis that held by his predecessor. However, the title would generally not be downgraded to any lower than a feng'en fuguo gong except under special circumstances.

The first bearer of the title was Yunyou (允祐; 1680–1730), the Kangxi Emperor's seventh son. In 1709, Yunyou was granted the title "Prince Chun of the Second Rank" by his father. He was promoted to "Prince Chun of the First Rank" in 1723 during the reign of his fourth brother, the Yongzheng Emperor. The title was passed down over seven generations and held by seven persons.

== Members of the Prince Chun peerage ==
- Yunyou (允祐; 1680 – 1730; 1st), 's seventh son of Kangxi Emperor, initially a beile, promoted to Prince Chun of the Second Rank in 1709 and then to Prince Chun of the First Rank in 1723, posthumously honoured as Prince Chundu of the First Rank (淳度親王)
  - 1 Hongshu (弘曙; 1698 – 1738), designated as Yunyou's hereditary prince from 1723 to 1727, his title stripped in 1727
    - three surviving sons: Yong'an (永安), Yongdun (永敦) and Yongsheng (永盛)
  - 2 Hongzhuo (弘晫; 1700 – 1743), held the title of a bulwark general in 1743
    - 2 Yonghong (永玒), held the title of a supporter general from 1744 to 1752
    - 3 Yongzhuang (永莊), held the title of a grace general from 1753 to 1777
  - 6 Hongjing (弘暻; 1711 – 1777; 2nd), designated as Yunyou's hereditary prince from 1727 to 1730, held the title Prince Chun of the Second Rank from 1730 to 1777, posthumously honoured as Prince Chunshen of the Second Rank (淳慎郡王)
    - other sons: Yongfan (永璠), Yongxie (永協), Yongqia (永恰), Yongzhuo (永卓) and Yongguang (永廣)
    - 8 Yongyun (永鋆; 1771 – 1820; 3rd), held the title of a beile from 1778 to 1820. His primary consort was one of Heshen's daughter.
      - 1 Miansuan (綿算)
      - 2 Mianqing (綿清; 1791 – 1851; 4th), held the title of a first class bulwark general from 1812 to 1821, promoted to beizi in 1821
        - three sons: Yilin (奕麟), Yimao (奕茂) and Yishu (奕孰)
        - 4 Yiliang (奕樑; 1819 – 1887; 5th), held the title of a third class defender general from 1838 to 1851, promoted to grace defender duke in 1851, made an acting beizi in 1872
          - eldest and 2nd son: Zaizhao (載炤) and Zaiguang (載灮)
          - 3 Zaikui (載㷇; 1862 – 1894; 6th), held the title of a grace defender duke from 1887 to 1894
            - 1 Pukun (溥堃; 1885 – 1932; 7th), held the title of a grace defender duke from 1895 to 1932
              - (a) Yuying (毓蓥), Pukun's adopted son
          - 4th to 6th son: Zaixiu (載烋), Zaixi (載熹) and Zaizheng (載烝), all of them were third class imperial body guards
        - 5 Yiquan (奕權), held the title of a second class bulwark general from 1844 to 1864, had no male heir
        - 6 Yirong (奕榕), held the title of a grace general from 1844 to 1875, stripped of his title in 1875
        - 7th to 11th son: Yimo (奕模), Yichun (奕純), Yixiao (奕效), Yisu (奕肅) and Yibo (奕博)
        - 12 Yifeng (奕楓), held the title of a grace general from 1851 to 1881
          - 3 Zaiwei (載煒), held the title of a grace general from 1881
      - 3 Miansan (綿𣿯), held the title of a first class bulwark general from 1826 to 1871, had no male heir
      - 4 Mianxie (綿爕), a vice commander-in-chief
      - 5 Mianxun (綿洵), held the title of a grace general from 1826 to 1858
        - 1 Yijian (奕檻), held the title of a grace general from 1859 to 1886
          - 1 Zaiyu (載煜), held the title of a grace general from 1887
      - 6 Mianjing (綿瀞)
      - 7 Mianshu (綿淑), held the title of a grace general from 1826 to 1847
        - 1 Yihua (奕樺), held the title of a grace general from 1847 to 1862, his title stripped in 1862
      - other younger sons: Miantian (綿田), Mianying (綿英) and Miangui (綿貴)
  - 7 Hongtai (弘泰; 1720 – 1757), held the title of a third class supporter general from 1743 to 1757

== Family tree ==
- - Title bearers
- - Emperors

adoption
Kangxi Emperor
7
Yunyou 允祐 ^{1} 1680 – 1730; Prince Chundu of the First Rank 淳度親王; 1723 – 1730
1	2	6	7
Hongshu 弘曙; 1698 – 1738; Hereditary Prince 世子; 1723 – 1727 (title stripped)	Hongzhuo 弘晫; 1700 – 1743; Bulwark General 輔國將軍; 1743	Hongjing 弘暻 ^{2} 1711 – 1777; Prince Chunshen of the Second Rank 淳慎郡王; 1730 – 1777	Hongtai 弘泰; 1720 – 1757; Third Class Supporter General 三等 奉國將軍; 1743 – 1757
2	3	8
Yong'an 永安; Yongdun 永敦; Yongsheng 永盛	Yonghong 永玒; Supporter General 奉國將軍; 1744 – 1752	Yongzhuang 永莊; Grace General 奉恩將軍; 1753 – 1777	Yongfan 永璠; Yongxie 永協; Yongqia 永恰; Yongzhuo 永卓; Yongguang 永廣	Yongyun 永鋆 ^{3} 1771 – 1820; Beile 貝勒; 1778 – 1820
1	2	3	4	5	6	7
Miansuan 綿算	Mianqing 綿清 ^{4} 1791 – 1851; Beizi 貝子; 1821 – 1851	Mian-? 綿𣿯; First Class Bulwark General 一等 輔國將軍; 1826 – 1871	Mianxie 綿爕	Mianxun 綿洵; Grace General 奉恩將軍; 1826 – 1858	Mianjing 綿瀞	Mianshu 綿淑; Grace General 奉恩將軍; 1826 – 1847
4	5	6	12	1	1
1. Yilin 奕麟; 2. Yimao; 奕茂; 3. Yishu 奕孰	Yiliang 奕樑 ^{5} 1819 – 1887; Grace Defender Duke acting Beizi 奉恩鎮國公 衔 貝子; 1851 – 1887	Yiquan 奕權; Second Class Bulwark General 二等 輔國將軍; 1844 – 1864	Yirong 奕榕; Grace General 奉恩將軍; 1844 – 1875 (title stripped)	7. Yimo; 奕模; 8. Yichun 奕純; 9. Yixiao 奕效; 10. Yisu 奕肅; 11. Yibo 奕博	Yifeng 奕楓; Grace General 奉恩將軍; 1851 – 1881	Yijian 奕檻; Grace General 奉恩將軍; 1859 – 1886	Yihua 奕樺; Grace General 奉恩將軍; 1847 – 1862 (title stripped)
3	1	1
1. Zaizhao; 載炤; 2. Zaiguang 載灮	Zaikui 載㷇 ^{6} 1862 – 1894; Grace Defender Duke 奉恩鎮國公; 1887 – 1894	4. Zaixiu 載烋; 5. Zaixi 載熹; 6. Zaizheng 載烝	Zaiwei 載煒; Grace General 奉恩將軍; 1881	Zaiyu 載煜; Grace General 奉恩將軍; 1887
1
Pukun 溥堃 ^{7} 1885 – 1932; Grace Defender Duke 奉恩鎮國公; 1895 – 1932
Yuying 毓蓥

== See also ==
- Royal and noble ranks of the Qing dynasty
