= Prince Xián =

Prince Xian of the First Rank

Chinese name
- Traditional Chinese: 和碩諴親王
- Simplified Chinese: 和硕𫍯亲王
Transcriptions
Standard Mandarin
- Hanyu Pinyin: héshuò xián qīnwáng
- Wade–Giles: ho-shuo hsien ch'in-wang

Manchu name
- Manchu script: ᡥᠣᡧᠣᡳ ᠶᠠᡤᡳᠶᠠᠩᡤᠠ ᠴᡳᠨ ᠸᠠᠩ
- Romanization: hošoi yargiyangga cin wang

Prince Xian of the First Rank, or simply Prince Xian, was the title of a princely peerage used in China during the Manchu-led Qing dynasty (1644–1912). As the Prince Xian peerage was not awarded "iron-cap" status, this meant that each successive bearer of the title would normally start off with a title downgraded by one rank vis-à-vis that held by his predecessor. However, the title would generally not be downgraded to any lower than a feng'en fuguo gong except under special circumstances.

The first bearer of the title was Yunbi (允祕; 1716–1773), the 24th son of the Kangxi Emperor. In 1733, he was awarded the title "Prince Xian of the First Rank" by his fourth brother, the Yongzheng Emperor, who succeeded their father. The title was passed down over seven generations and was held by six persons.

== Members of the Prince Xian peerage ==
- Yunbi (允祕; 1716–1773), the Kangxi Emperor's 24th son, held the title Prince Xian of the First Rank from 1733 to 1773, posthumously honoured as Prince Xianke of the First Rank (諴恪親王)
  - Hongchang (弘暢; 1741–1795), Yunbi's eldest son, initially a buru bafen zhenguo gong from 1757 to 1774, held the title Prince Xian of the Second Rank from 1774 to 1795, posthumously honoured as Prince Xianmi of the Second Rank (諴密郡王)
    - Yongzhu (永珠; 1759–1837), Hongchang's eldest son, initially a third class zhenguo jiangjun from 1784 to 1788, held the title of a beile from 1795 to 1836, stripped of his title in 1836
  - Hongwu (弘旿; 1743–1811), Yunbi's second son, held the title of a second class zhenguo jiangjun from 1753 to 1774, promoted to beizi in 1774, stripped of his title in 1778, reinstated as a feng'en jiangjun in 1794, stripped of his title in 1799 but restored in 1809
    - Yongsong (永松; 1782–1827), Hongwu's fifth son, held the title of a feng'en jiangjun from 1811 to 1827, posthumously honoured as a beizi in 1837
      - Mianxun (綿勳; 1817–1893), Yongsong's second son, held the title of a feng'en jiangjun from 1827 to 1836, promoted to beizi in 1836
        - Yijun (奕均; 1836–1871), Mianxun's second son, held the title of a zhenguo jiangjun from 1868 to 1871
          - Zaixin (載信; 1855–1900), Yijun's eldest son, held the title of a zhenguo jiangjun from 1872 to 1894, promoted to feng'en zhenguo gong in 1894
            - Puyu (溥霱; 1879–1934), Zaixin's eldest son, held the title of a feng'en zhenguo gong from 1902 to 1934
            - Puji (溥霽), Zaixin's second son, held the title of a first class fuguo jiangjun from 1904 to 1933
            - Pubin (溥霦), Zaixin's third son, held the title of a first class fuguo jiangjun from 1904
            - Pumu (溥霂), Zaixin's fourth son, held the title of a first class fuguo jiangjun from 1904
    - Yongxiang (永祥), Hongchang's second son, held the title of a third class zhenguo jiangjun from 1784 to 1811
      - Mianjie (綿傑), Yongxiang's eldest son, held the title of a fuguo jiangjun from 1826 to 1829, had no male heir
    - Yongqin (永芩), Hongchang's third son, held the title of a third class zhenguo jiangjun from 1791 to 1826, stripped of his title in 1826
      - Mianhuan (綿煥), Yongqin's eldest son, held the title of a feng'en jiangjun from 1826 to 1852, had no male heir
      - Mianxing (綿𠻖), Yongqin's third son, initially held the title of a fuguo jiangjun, demoted to feng'en jiangjun in 1825, succeeded Yongyu in 1840
    - Yongyu (永裕), Hongchang's fourth son, held the title of a third class zhenguo jiangjun from 1791 to 1825
      - Miandan (綿丹), Yongyu's eldest son, held the title of a fuguo jiangjun from 1825 to 1845, had no male heir
  - Hongkang (弘康; 1747–1814), Yunbi's third son, initially a second class zhenguo jiangjun from 1770 to 1809, became an acting buru bafen fuguo gong from 1809 to 1814
    - Yongchun (永純), Hongkang's eldest son, held the title of a fengguo jiangjun from 1811 to 1814, became a fuguo jiangjun from 1814 to 1841, stripped of his title in 1841
  - Hongchao (弘超; 1755–1808), Yunbi's fourth son, held the title of a third class fuguo jiangjun from 1775 to 1777, stripped of his title in 1777

== Family tree ==
Yunbi 允祕 (1716–1773); Prince Xianke of the First Rank 諴恪親王 (1733–1773)
Hongchang 弘暢 (1741–1795); Prince Xianmi of the Second Rank 諴密郡王 (1774–1795) | Hongwu 弘旿 (1743–1811); Feng'en Jiangjun 奉恩將軍 (1794–1799; 1809–1811)
Yongzhu 永珠 (1759–1837); Beile 貝勒 (1795–1836) (stripped of his title) | Yongsong 永松 (1782–1827); Beizi 貝子 (posthumously awarded)
Mianxun 綿勳 (1817–1893); Beizi 貝子 (1836–1893)
Yijun 奕均 (1836–1871); Zhenguo Jiangjun 鎮國將軍 (1868–1871)
Zaixin 載信 (1855–1900); Feng'en Zhenguo Gong 奉恩鎮國公 (1894–1900)
Puyu 溥霱 (1879–1934); Feng'en Zhenguo Gong 奉恩鎮國公 (1902–1934)

== See also ==
- Royal and noble ranks of the Qing dynasty
