= Yunhu =

Qing Chinese prince

Yunhu 允祜
- Prince Gongqin of the Third Rank

Prince of the Third Rank
- Tenure: 16 March 1734 – 12 February 1744

Prince of the Fourth Rank
- Tenure: 20 March 1730 – 16 March 1734
- Born: Aisin Gioro Yunhu (愛新覺羅·允祜); 10 January 1712
- Died: 12 February 1744 (aged 32)
- Consorts: Lady Irgen Gioro; Lady Uya
- Issue: 5 sons 4 daughters
Names
- Aisin Gioro Yunhu (愛新覺羅·允祜)
Posthumous name
- Prince Gongqin of the Third Rank 恭勤貝勒
- House: Aisin Gioro
- Father: Kangxi Emperor
- Mother: Imperial Concubine Jin

Aisin Gioro Yunhu (允祜; 10 January 1712 – 12 February 1744), born Yinhu, formally known as Prince of the Third Rank (貝勒), was an imperial prince of the Manchu ruled Qing Dynasty. He was the 32nd son of Kangxi Emperor and the 22nd who would survive to adulthood.

== Life ==
Yinhu was born on the third day of December in the 51st year of Kangxi reign to Xuanye, the Kangxi Emperor, and Imperial Concubine Jin.

He changed his name to Yunhu when his elder brother, Yinzhen, ascended to the throne as Yongzheng Emperor.

In the 8th year of Yongzheng reign (1730), he was granted the title of Prince of the Third Rank. In the 12th year of Yongzheng, he was awarded with the titles of Prince Jin of the Third Rank (晉貝勒).

In 1738, an official named Sun Jiagan reported that storehouses of Yunhu's manor were overflown with tributes. The report led to a trial at the Imperial Clan Court. Nevertheless, Yunhu did not lose his title.

He died in the 9th year of Qianlong reign (1743) and was posthumously conferred a title of Prince Gongqin of the Third Rank (恭勤貝勒)

== Family ==
Primary Consort

- First Primary Consort, of the Irgen Gioro clan (嫡夫人 伊爾根覺羅氏)
  - Prince Honglong (贝子 弘昽; 22 November 1727 – 24 March 1784), Prince of the Fourth Rank, first son
  - Princess of the Fourth Rank (17 June 1730 – 26 June 1775), first daughter
    - Married Mabao (瑪寶) of the Magiya clan in 1745
  - Princess of the Fourth Rank (2 September 1731 – 11 November 1785), second daughter
    - Married Jalafungga (扎拉丰阿) of the Ulanghan clan (烏梁罕氏)
- Second Primary Consort, of the Uya clan (繼夫人 烏雅氏)
  - Hongsong (镇国将军 弘嵩; 24 March 1743 – 9 July 1777), Hereditary General of the First Rank, fourth son
  - Hongfeng ( 辅国将军 弘丰; 7 May 1744 – 10 November 1803), Hereditary General of the Second Rank, fifth son

Concubine

- Mistress, of the Cheng clan (妾 程氏)
  - Ruibao (瑞保; 23 December 1742 – 17 December 1745), third son
- Mistress, of the Yang clan (妾 楊氏)
  - Second son (17 January 1729 – 14 February 1731)
  - Third daughter (19 December 1733 – 16 July 1805)
    - Married Gengdouzha'er (庚都扎爾) of the Aohan Borjigin clan in 1747
- Mistress, of the Liu clan (妾 劉氏)
  - Fourth Daughter (22 April 1739 – 1 April 1822)
    - Married Tsereng Damba (色楞丹巴) of the Khorchin Borjigit clan in 1748

== See also ==
- Royal and noble ranks of the Qing dynasty
- Ranks of imperial consorts in China#Qing
