= Yunyou =

- Prince Chun of the First Rank 和碩淳親王

Prince Chun of the First Rank
- Tenure: 28 May 1723 – 18 May 1730
- Successor: Hongjing

Prince Chun of the Second Rank
- Tenure: 24 April 1709 – 28 May 1723
- Born: Yinyou (胤祐); 19 August 1680
- Died: 18 May 1730 (aged 49)
- Consorts: Lady Hada Nara
- Issue: Princess of the Third Rank; Princess of the Third Rank; Hongshu; Princess of the Third Rank; Hongzhuo; Hongxin; Princess of the Third Rank; Hongjing; Hongtai; Princess of the Fourth Rank
Names
- Yunyou (允祐)
Posthumous name
- Prince Chundu of the First Rank (淳度親王)
- House: Aisin Gioro
- Father: Kangxi Emperor
- Mother: Consort Cheng

Yinyou
- Chinese: 胤祐
Transcriptions
Standard Mandarin
- Hanyu Pinyin: Yìnyòu

Yunyou
- Chinese: 允祐
Transcriptions
Standard Mandarin
- Hanyu Pinyin: Yǔnyòu

Yunyou (Chinese: 允祐; 19 August 1680 – 18 May 1730) was an imperial prince of the Qing dynasty and the seventh son of the Kangxi Emperor. In 1709, Yunyou was granted the title "Prince Chun of the Second Rank" by his father. He was promoted to "Prince Chun of the First Rank" in 1723.

The Prince Chun peerage was not awarded "iron-cap" status. This meant that each successive bearer of the title would normally start off with a title downgraded by one rank. Hongjing, Yunyou's sixth son, held the title of Prince Chun of the Second Rank from 1730 to 1777.

Yunyou was born in the 19th year of Kangxi reign, with a disability in his right leg. His birth mother was Consort Cheng of Daigiya clan, but he was raised by Consort Hui of Yehe Nara clan.

== Family ==
Primary Consort

- Primary consort, of the Hada Nara clan (嫡福晉 哈達那拉氏)
  - Third daughter (19 November 1699 – July/August 1702)
  - Princess of the Third Rank (郡主; 19 September 1701 – 30 December 1729), 5th daughter
    - Married Baojin (保进) of the Wendu (温度) clan in 1718

Secondary Consort

- Secondary consort, of the Nara clan (側福晉 納喇氏)
  - Princess of the Third Rank (郡主; 17 December 1696 – December 1720 or January 1721), 1st daughter
    - Married Tuizhong (推忠/推忠) of the Naiman Borjigin in 1714
  - Hongshu, Prince Chun of the First Rank (弘曙; 21 January 1698 – 18 May 1738), 1st son
  - Princess of the Third Rank (郡主; 6 October 1699 – 25 January 1733), 2nd daughter
    - Married Dorji Lashi (多尔济拉氏) of the Aohandu clan in 1717
  - Hongzhuo, General of the Second Rank (輔國將軍 弘晫; 26 November 1700 – 20 October 1743), 2nd son
  - Hongxin (弘昕; 3 June 1702 – 10 September 1712), 4th son
- Secondary consort, of the Barda clan (側福晉 巴爾達氏)
  - Hongjing, Prince Chunshen of the Second Rank (淳慎郡王 弘暻; 24 August 1711 – 15 August 1777), 6th son

Concubine

- Mistress, of the Li clan (李佳氏)
  - Fourth daughter (24 January 1701 – June/July 1709)
  - Fifth son (11 June 1705 – 19 August 1709)
  - Princess of the Third Rank (郡主; 28 November 1710 – 18 October 1742), 7th daughter
    - Married Sebotengduo'erji (色卜騰多爾濟) of the Khorchin Borjigin clan in 1731
- Mistress, of the Irgen Gioro clan (伊尔根觉罗氏)
  - Third son (31 May 1702 – 8 April 1703)
  - Sixth daughter (30 June 1709 – April/May 1710)
- Mistress, of the Fuca clan (富察氏)
  - Princess of the Fourth Rank (3 September 1726 – 11 November 1745), 9th daughter
    - Married Huturingga of the Kharchin Ulanghaijimot clan in 1741
  - Tenth daughter (14 December 1728 – 1730)
- Mistress, of the Chen clan (陳氏)
  - Hongtai, General of the Third Rank (弘泰; 22 July 1720 – 28 July 1757), 7th son
  - Eight daughter (21 November 1720 – July 1723)

== See also ==
- Royal and noble ranks of the Qing dynasty
- Imperial Chinese harem system
- Prince Chun
