= Yunci =

Yunci 允祁
- Prince of the Third Rank
- Born: Aisin Gioro Yinqi (愛新覺羅·胤祁); 14 January 1714; Beijing, Forbidden City
- Died: 31 August 1785 (aged 71); Beijing
- Consorts: Lady Fuca
- Issue: 7 sons 10 daughters
Names
- Aisin Gioro Yunqi (愛新覺羅·允祁)
Posthumous name
- Prince Cheng of the Third Rank 誠貝勒
- House: Aisin Gioro
- Father: Kangxi Emperor
- Mother: Imperial Concubine Jing

Aisin Gioro Yunci (Manchu: ᠶᡡᠨ ᠴᡳ, romanized: yūn ci, Chinese: 允祁; pinyin: Yǔnqí; 14 January 1714 – 31 August 1785), was a Manchu Prince of the Third rank. He was the 23rd surviving son of Kangxi Emperor.

== Life ==
Yinqi was born on 14 January 1714 to Imperial Concubine Jing, Lady Shi. He was not embroiled in succession brawl among Kangxi Emperor's sons due to prematurity. In 1730, Yunqi was granted a title of grace defender duke (镇国公). Like his half-brother Yunxu, Yunqi was charged with the affairs of Eastern Qing tombs. In 1735, Yunqi was promoted to Prince of the Fourth rank.

In November 1784, he was granted the title of Prince of the Third Rank (多罗贝勒).

He was posthumously named Prince Cheng of the Third Rank and given a status of Prince of the Second Rank which meant that he and his family members were entitled to receive privileges of Prince of the Second Rank.

== See also ==
- Royal and noble ranks of the Qing dynasty
- Ranks of imperial consorts in China § Qing
