= Prince Cheng of the Second Rank =

- Traditional Chinese: 多羅誠郡王
- Simplified Chinese: 多罗诚郡王
Transcriptions
Standard Mandarin
- Hanyu Pinyin: duōluó chéng jùnwáng
- Wade–Giles: to-lo ch'eng chün-wang

Prince Cheng of the Second Rank, or simply Prince Cheng, was the title of a princely peerage used in China during the Manchu-led Qing dynasty (1644–1912). As the Prince Cheng peerage was not awarded "iron-cap" status, this meant that each successive bearer of the title would normally start off with a title downgraded by one rank vis-à-vis that held by his predecessor. However, the title would generally not be downgraded to any lower than a feng'en fuguo gong except under special circumstances.

The first bearer of the title was Yunzhi (1677–1732), the third son of the Kangxi Emperor. In 1698, Yunzhi was granted the title "Prince Cheng of the Second Rank" by his father. The title was passed down over eight generations and held by eight persons.

== Members of the Prince Cheng peerage ==
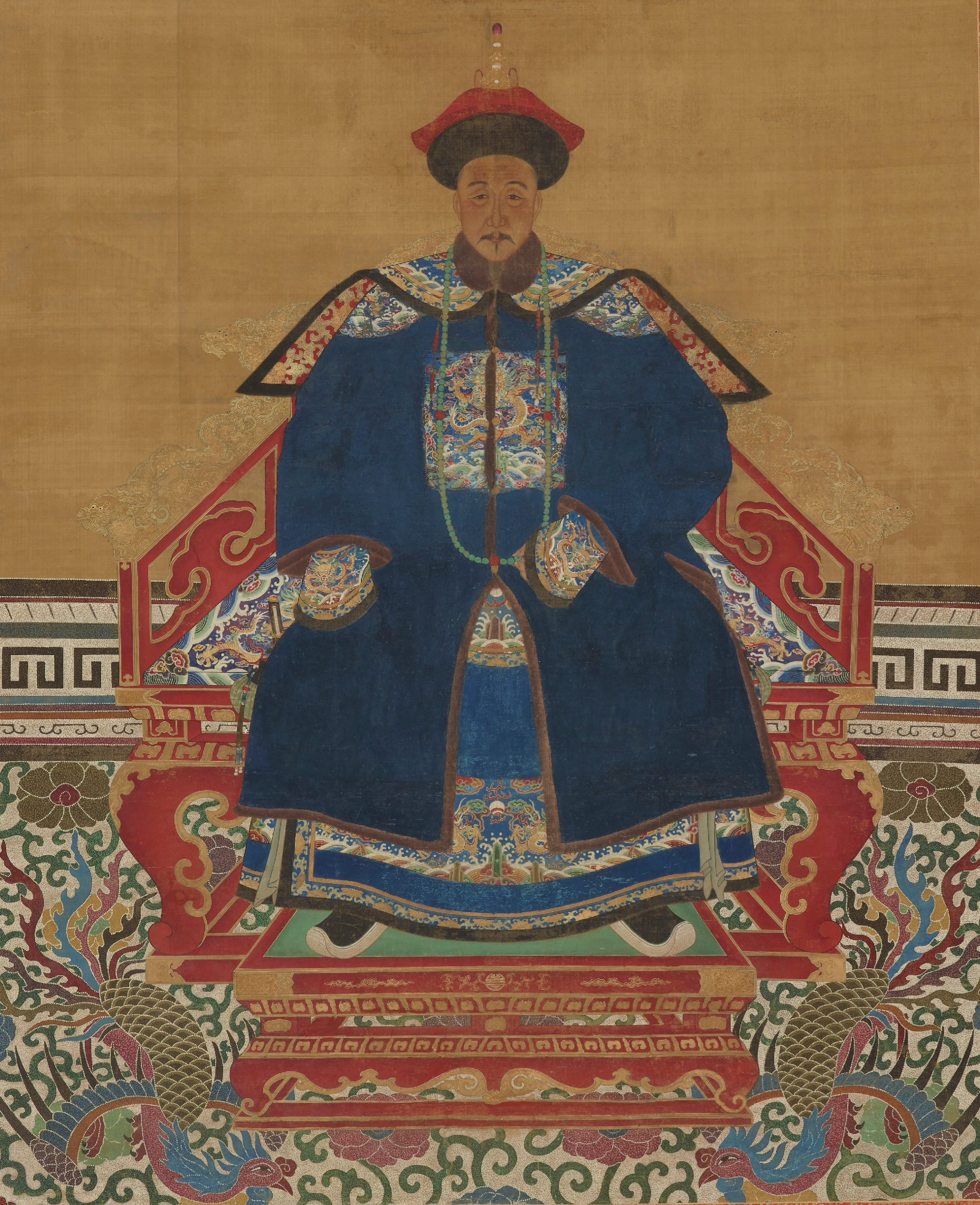
Yunzhi (1677–1732), the first Prince Cheng

- Yunzhi (1677–1732), the Kangxi Emperor's third son, initially a junwang (second-rank prince), demoted to beile in 1699, promoted to qinwang (first-rank prince) in 1709, demoted to junwang again in 1728, restored as a qinwang briefly in 1730 before being stripped of his title, posthumously restored as a junwang under the title Prince Chengyin of the Second Rank (誠隱郡王)
  - Hongsheng (弘晟; 1698–1732), Yunzhi's third son, designated as Yunzhi's shizi (heir apparent) from 1720 to 1724, stripped of his title in 1724
  - Hongjing (弘暻; 1703–1777), Yunzhi's seventh son, initially made a feng'en zhenguo gong from 1728 to 1730, held the title of a beizi from 1730 to 1777
    - Yongpo (永珀), Hongjing's second son, held the title of a second class fengguo jiangjun from 1749 to 1760, stripped of his title in 1760
    - Yongshan (永珊; 1746–1797), Hongjing's third son, held the title of a feng'en zhenguo gong from 1777 to 1797
      - Miance (綿策; 1780–1800), Yongshan's third son, held the title of a feng'en fuguo gong from 1797 to 1800, had no male heir
  - Honghuang (弘晃; 1713–1749), Yunzhi's tenth son
    - Yongheng (永珩; 1739–1778), Honghuang's son
      - Miandao (綿道; 1764–1825)
        - Yiguo (奕果; 1791–1870), Miandao's second son and Miance's successor, held the title of a buru bafen fuguo gong from 1801 to 1870
          - Zailing (載齡; 1812–1883), Yiguo's eldest son, held the title of a buru bafen fuguo gong from 1870 to 1883, had no male heir
  - Hongxian (弘暹; 1710–1771), Yunzhi's eighth son
    - Yongbian (永玣; 1739–1803), Hongxian's son
      - Mianxie (綿爕; 1764–1793), Yongbian's son
    - Yongjie (永介; 1741–1793), Hongxian's son
      - Mianchao (綿超; 1765–1817), Yongjie' son
        - Yiguang (奕光; 1791–1830), Mianchao's son and Mianxie's adopted son
          - Zaishuang (載雙; 1836–1878), Yiguang's son
            - Puyuan (溥元; 1870–1927), Zaishuang's eldest son and Zailing's successor, held the title of a buru bafen fuguo gong from 1884 to 1927
              - Yupeng (毓彭; 1893–?), Puyuan's eldest son, held the title of a buru bafen fuguo gong from 1927 to 1928, stripped of his title in 1928
                - Henghai (恆海; 1915–?), Yupeng's son

== Family tree ==
adoption
Yunzhi 允祉 (1677–1732); Prince Chengyin of the Second Rank 誠隱郡王 (posthumously awarded)
Hongjing 弘暻 (1703–1777); Beizi 貝子 (1730–1777) | Hongxian 弘暹 (1710–1771) | Honghuang 弘晃 (1713–1749)
Yongshan 永珊 (1746–1797); Feng'en Zhenguo Gong 奉恩鎮國公 (1777–1797) | Yongbian 永玣 (1739–1803) | Yongjie 永介 (1741–1793) | Yongheng 永珩 (1739–1778)
Miance 綿策 (1780–1800); Feng'en Fuguo Gong 奉恩輔國公 (1797–1800) | Mianxie 綿爕 (1764–1793) | Mianchao 綿超 (1765–1817) | Miandao 綿道 (1764–1825)
Yiguang 奕光 (1791–1830) | Yiguo 奕果 (1791–1870); Buru Bafen Fuguo Gong 不入八分輔國公 (1801–1870)
Zaishuang 載雙 (1836–1878) | Zailing 載齡 (1812–1883); Buru Bafen Fuguo Gong 不入八分輔國公 (1870–1883)
Puyuan 溥元 (1870–1927); Buru Bafen Fuguo Gong 不入八分輔國公 (1884–1927)
Yupeng 毓彭 (1893–?); Buru Bafen Fuguo Gong 不入八分輔國公 (1927–1928) (stripped of his title)
Henghai 恆海 (1915–?)

== See also ==
- Royal and noble ranks of the Qing dynasty
