= Yunzhi, Prince Cheng =

Yunzhi
- Prince Cheng of the First Rank (和碩誠親王)
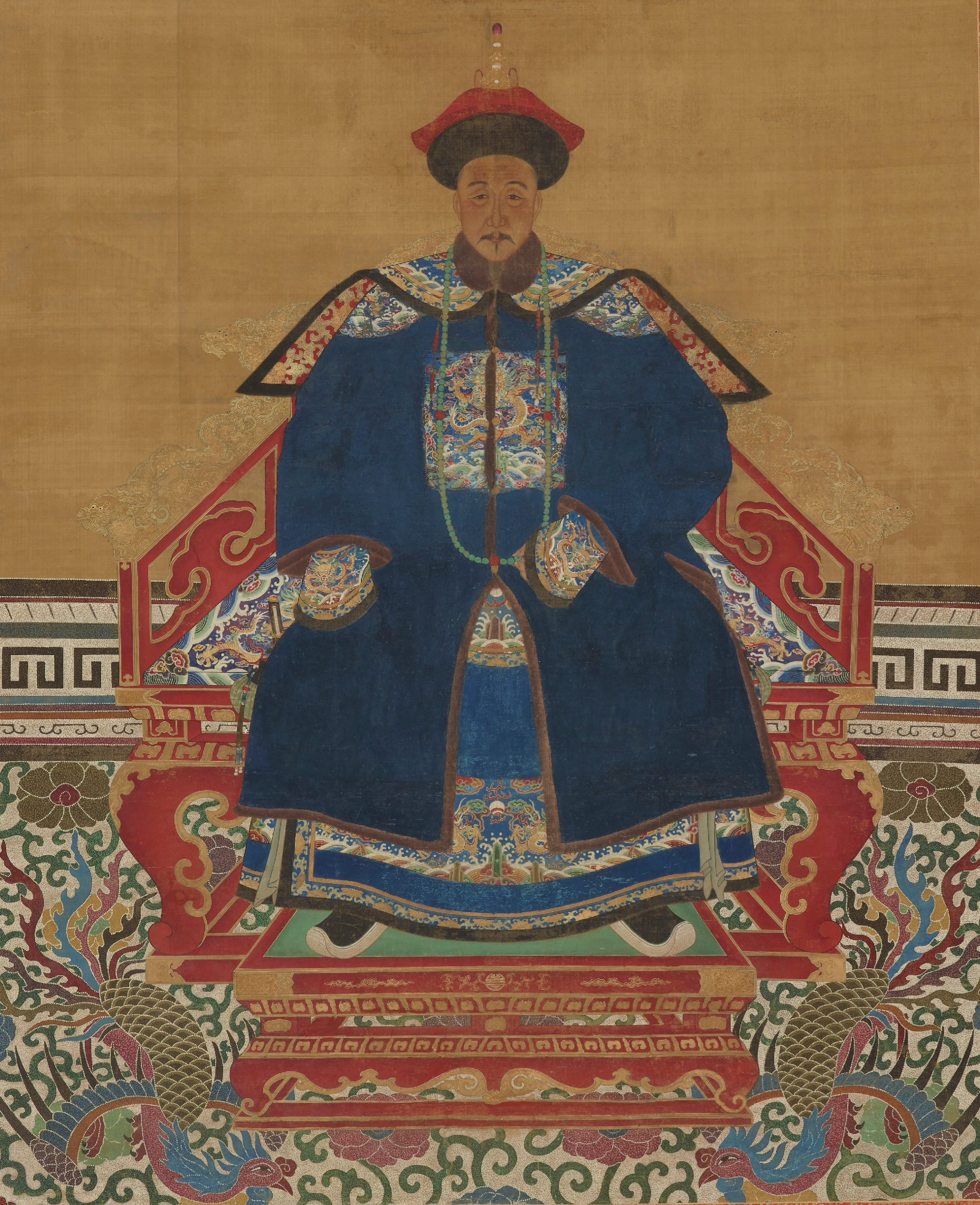
- Portrait of Yinzhi

Prince Cheng of the First Rank
- Tenure: 28 May 1723 – 11 June 1730
- Successor: Hongjing

Prince Cheng of the Second Rank
- Tenure: 24 April 1698 – 28 May 1723
- Born: Aisin Gioro Yinzhi (愛新覺羅·胤祉); 23 March 1677
- Died: 10 July 1732 (aged 55)
- Consorts: Lady Donggo
- Issue: Hongsheng; Hongxi; Hongjing; Hongxian; Honghuang; Hongyi; Hongzhu; Princess of the Third Rank; Princess of the Third Rank
Names
- Aisin Gioro Yunzhi (愛新覺羅·允祉)
Posthumous name
- Prince Chengyin of the Second Rank (誠隱郡王)
- House: Aisin Gioro
- Father: Kangxi Emperor
- Mother: Consort Rong (Kangxi)

Yinzhi
- Chinese: 胤祉
Transcriptions
Standard Mandarin
- Hanyu Pinyin: Yìnzhǐ

Yunzhi
- Chinese: 允祉
Transcriptions
Standard Mandarin
- Hanyu Pinyin: Yǔnzhǐ

Yunzhi (23 March 1677 – 10 July 1732), also known as Yinzhi, was a Manchu prince of the Qing Dynasty.

== Biography ==
Yinzhi was born of the Manchu Aisin Gioro clan as the third son of the Kangxi Emperor. His mother was Consort Rong (榮妃; d. 28 March 1727) from the Magiya clan and was the daughter of Gaishan (蓋山), who served as an Imperial Examination Examiner (員外郎). Yinzhi was granted the title of "Prince Cheng of the Second Rank" (誠郡王) in 1698.

Yinzhi was known to be studious as a child and was versed in literary arts. His talents earned him the appreciation of his father. French Jesuit Joachim Bouvet once mentioned in a letter to King Louis XIV that the Kangxi Emperor personally taught Yinzhi geometry. When the Kangxi Emperor opened a school in Changchun Gardens (暢春園), he placed Yinzhi in charge of compiling a book titled Lü Li Yuan Yuan (律歷淵源), which included the shi-er-lü, calendrical calculations, and mathematics. Yinzhi was also known for his skill in calligraphy, and was tasked with writing the inscriptions on the memorial tablet at the Kangxi Emperor's tomb in Jingling Mausoleum, Eastern Qing Tombs.

Yinzhi showed little interest in the conflict among his brothers for succession to the throne. He did not take any sides in the contention and preferred to spend time compiling and writing books. In 1706 the encyclopedia Complete Classics Collection of Ancient China was completed by Chen Menglei (陳夢雷), a scholar and associate of Yinzhi.

In 1722 the Kangxi Emperor died and was succeeded by his fourth son Yinzhen, who became known as the Yongzheng Emperor. Yinzhi changed his name to "Yunzhi" to avoid naming taboo because the Chinese character for "Yin" (胤) in "Yinzhi" is the same as the one in the Yongzheng Emperor's personal name "Yinzhen" (胤禛). After his ascension to the throne, the Yongzheng Emperor ordered Yunzhi to remain at the Jingling Mausoleum to watch over their father's tomb on an excuse that "Yinzhi was closely affiliated to the crown prince (Yinreng)". Yunzhi was unhappy with this arrangement and complained behind the Yongzheng Emperor's back. When Yinxiang, one of Yongzheng's closest half brothers, died in 1730, Yunzhi expressed little grief and sorrow. Yongzheng was angry when he heard of Yunzhi's reaction, so he stripped Yunzhi of his title and had him confined in the Yong'an Pavilion, Jingshan, Beijing. Yunzhi died in 1732 during his incarceration.

== Family ==
Primary Consort

- Princess Consort Chengyin of the Second Rank, of the Donggo clan (誠隱郡王福晋 董鄂氏)
  - Hongqing (弘晴; 30 November 1696 – 3 March 1701), first son
  - Hongsheng (弘晟; 5 October 1698 – 28 August 1732), third son
  - First daughter (8 March 1700 – September/October 1701)
  - Princess of the Third Rank (郡主; 3 October 1701 – 15 October 1753), second daughter
    - Married Genzhapuduo'erji (根扎普多爾濟) of the Khalkha Borjigit clan in January/February 1717

Secondary Consort

- Secondary consort, of the Tian clan (側福晉 田氏)
  - Second son (18 April 1698 – 19 April 1698)
  - Fourth daughter (24 February 1702 – February/March 1706)
  - Hongjing, Prince of the Fourth Rank (貝子 弘暻; 4 July 1703 – 27 April 1777), seventh son

Concubine

- Mistress, of the Wang clan (王氏)
  - Fourth son (29 December 1698)
  - Hongxi (弘曦; 16 February 1701 – 3 December 1742), sixth son
- Mistress, of the Fuca clan (富察氏)
  - Fifth son (30 April 1699 – 8 May 1699)
- Mistress, of the Irgen Gioro clan (伊爾根覺羅氏)
  - Princess of the Third Rank (郡主; 24 February 1702 – 1 April 1746), third daughter
    - Married Yidamuzhapu (伊達穆扎普) of the Khorchin Gulusiqipu (固魯斯奇普) clan in January/February 1720
- Mistress, of the Li clan (李氏)
  - Hongxian (弘暹; 7 February 1710 – 3 September 1771), eighth son
- Mistress, of the Zhu clan (朱氏)
  - Ninth son (16 February 1711 – 28 February 1711)
  - Fifth daughter (28 December 1712 – 2 June 1715)
- Mistress, of the Cideri clan (奇德理氏)
  - Honghuang (弘晃; 2 June 1713 – 2 October 1749), tenth son
- Mistress, of the Wanggiya clan (完顏氏)
  - Hongyi (弘易; 1 March 1715 – 23 July 1754), 11th son
- Mistress, of the Wu clan (吳氏)
  - Sixth daughter (29 January 1730 – 13 September 1732)
- Mistress, of the Chen clan (陳氏)
  - Hongzhu (弘矚; 2 January 1731 – 9 March 1776), 12th son

== Ancestry ==
Nurhaci (1559–1626)
Hong Taiji (1592–1643)
Empress Xiaocigao (1575–1603)
Shunzhi Emperor (1638–1661)
Jaisang
Empress Xiaozhuangwen (1613–1688)
Boli (d. 1654)
Kangxi Emperor (1654–1722)
Yangzhen (d. 1621)
Tulai (1606–1658)
Empress Xiaokangzhang (1638–1663)
Lady Gioro
Yunzhi (1677–1732)
Ninggude
Ningge
Gaishan
Consort Rong (Kangxi)(d. 1727)

== In fiction and popular culture ==
- Portrayed by Chen Jingyu in Scarlet Heart (2011)

== See also ==
- Qing Dynasty nobility
- Ranks of Imperial Consorts in China#Qing
