= Tiyeboo =

Manchu name
- Manchu script: ᡨ᠋ᡳᠶᡝᠪᠣᠣ
- Möllendorff: tiyeboo

Chinese name
- Chinese: 铁保
Transcriptions
Standard Mandarin
- Hanyu Pinyin: tiě bǎo

Pronunciation respelling name
- Pronunciation respelling: TEE-yeh-bow

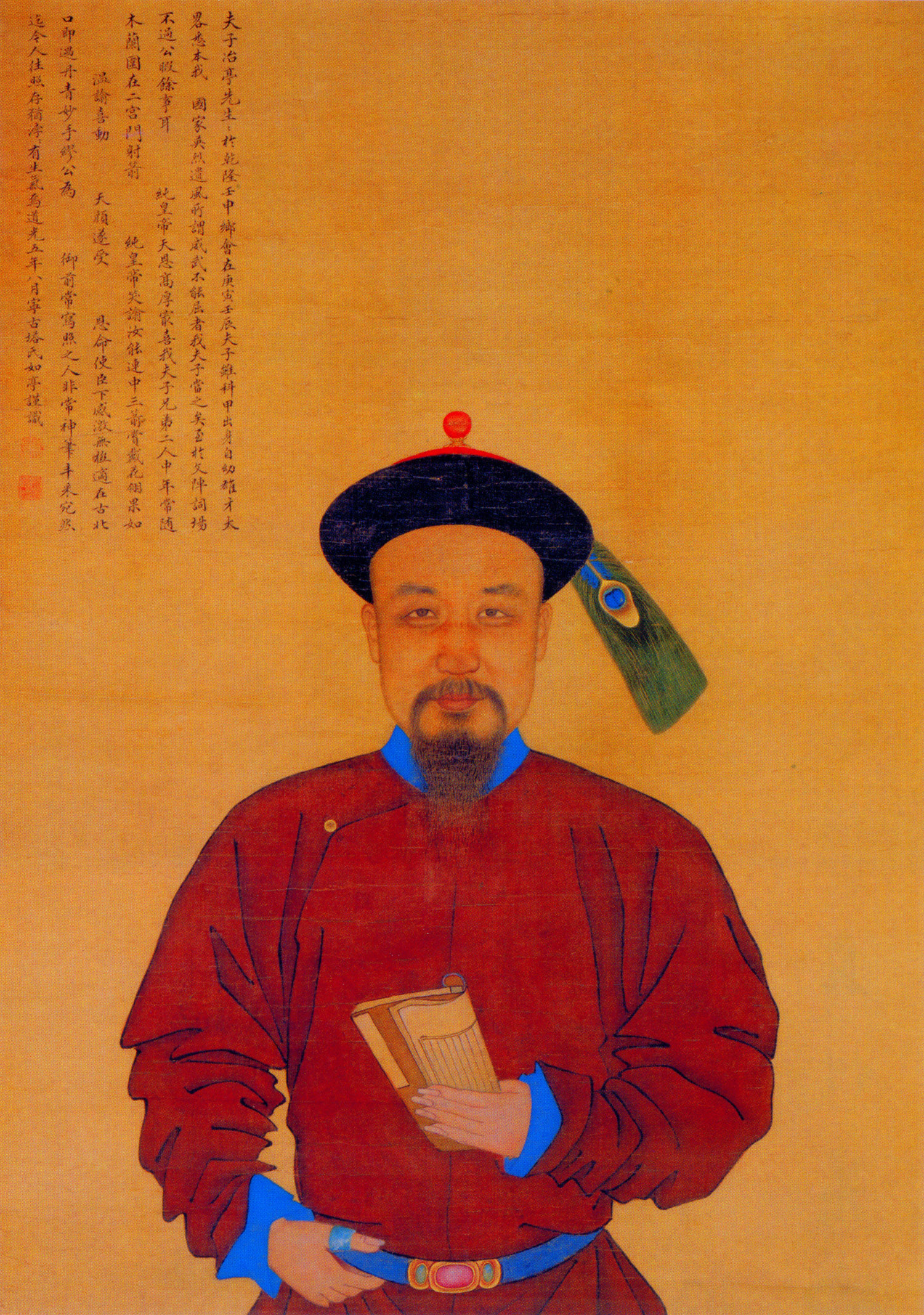
A portrait of Tiyeboo

Tiyeboo (1752-1824), courtesy name Yeting (冶亭), art name Mei'an (梅庵), was a Qing official, calligrapher, and scholar of the Donggo clan from the Manchu Plain Yellow Banner. He obtained the Jinshi degree in 1772 and served in a number of senior official positions.

== Biography ==
Tiyeboo's ancestor Joto was a clansman of the founding minister Hohori, whose original surname was Gioro and joined Nurhaci during his raising. According to Tiyeboo's own research, he believed that his further ancestor was Zhao Si (趙偲), Prince of Yue of the Northern Song dynasty, who was captured by the Jurchens. Although born into a family of military officers, he pursued a civil career. After earning the Jinshi degree, he entered the Ministry of Personnel and was promoted steadily through the court system with the support of Grand Secretary Agui, eventually serving as Deputy Minister of Rites (禮部侍郎), Academician of the Imperial Cabinet (內閣學士), and host for the metropolitan and provincial examinations.

During the reign of the Jiaqing Emperor, Tiyeboo served as Viceroy of Grain Transport (漕運總督), Governors of Guangdong (廣東巡撫), Shandong (山東巡撫), and Viceroy of Liangjiang. As Viceroy of Grain Transport, he introduced administrative reforms, and later compiled practical guidelines for his successors based on his experience. He also directed relief efforts following the Yellow River flood of 1803. In 1809, however, he was held accountable for negligence as a leader in subordinate's case of corruption and murder of imperial inspector and was dismissed and exiled to Xinjiang. After returning to Beijing, he served as Ministers of Rites and Personnel, but was again dismissed and exiled to Jilin after the Eight Trigrams Uprising. He returned to the capital in 1818 and retired due to illness in the early Daoguang reign, dying in 1824.

As a reputable calligrapher and scholar in his era, Tiyeboo also served as chief editor of Comprehensive Statutes of the Eight Banners (欽定八旗通志), Anthology of Odes and Eulogies of the Prosperous Dynasty (熙朝雅頌集, a poem collection of Bannermen), and author of his own poem collections.
