= Hūrhan =

Manchu name
- Manchu script: ᡥᡡᡵᡥᠠᠨ
- Möllendorff: hūrhan

Chinese name
- Chinese: 扈爾漢
Transcriptions
Standard Mandarin
- Hanyu Pinyin: hù ěr hàn

Pronunciation respelling name
- Pronunciation respelling: HO-er-hahn

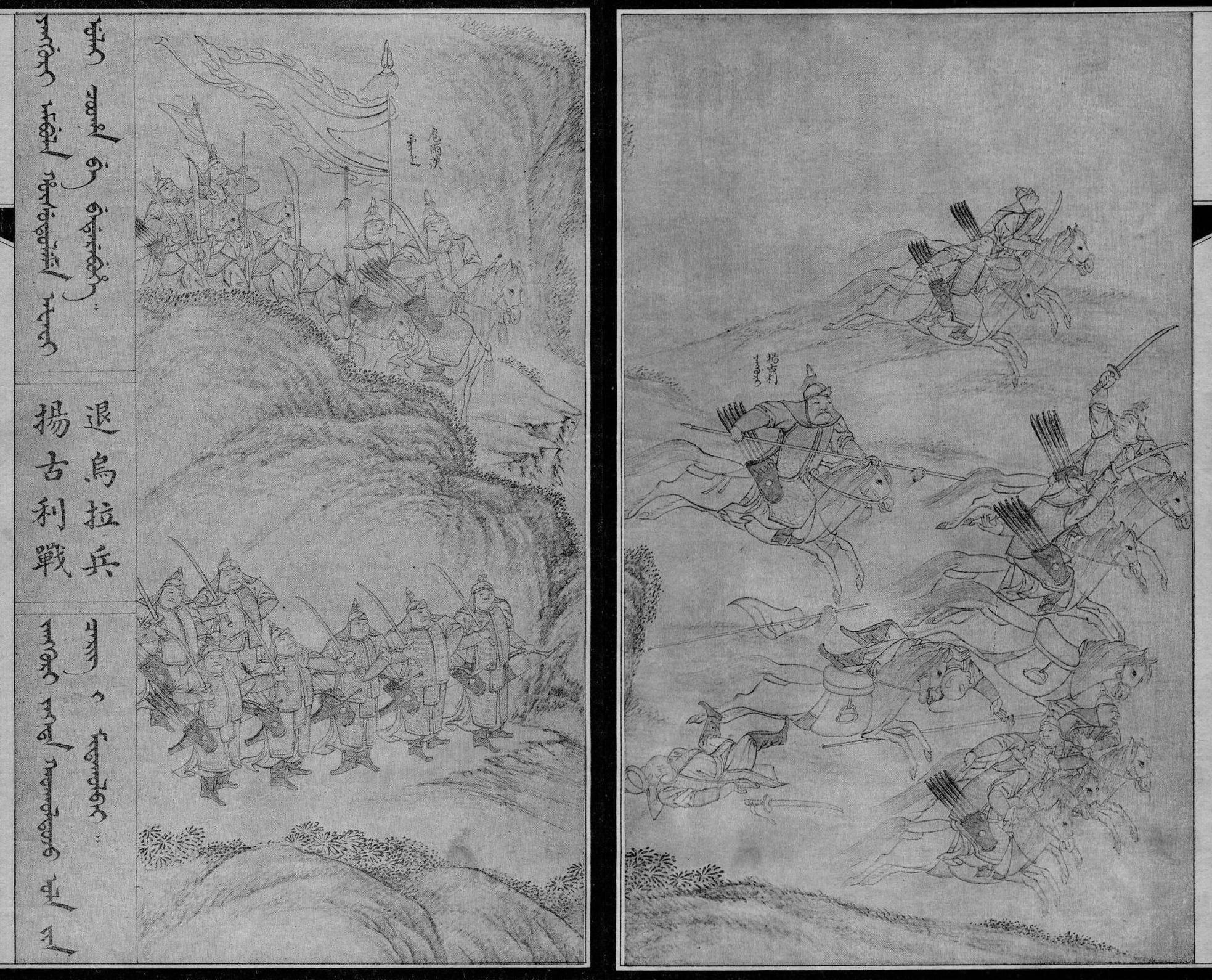
Hūrhan (commander at top left) fighting against Ula troops along with Yangguri

Darhan Hiya Hūrhan (1578-1623), a member of Tunggiya clan, was a prominent minister and military commander under Nurhaci during the rise of Jianzhou Jurchen and Later Jin Khanate. His family came from Yarhu village which entered Nurhaci’s service following his father and the tribal leader, Hūlahū, and later organized into the Plain White Banner. Hūrhan was raised as an adopted son by Nurhaci at the age of thirteen. He was also granted the imperial surname Gioro and later became one of Nurhaci's most trusted ministers and generals.

== Biography ==
Hūrhan distinguished himself in numerous campaigns against the Ula, Warka, and Woji tribes. In 1607, he helped escort the surrender of the Fio Hoton of Warka tribes, which was a vessel tribe under Ula. Hūrhan played a key role in defeating a much larger Ula force sent by the ruler Bujantai. He subsequently led several expeditions into Woji territory, capturing thousands of people and households. For his military achievements, Nurhaci awarded him armor, horses, and the honorary title Darhan Hiya (達爾漢侍衛, "the Minister Guard").

He participated in the conquest of Ula in 1613 and was subsequently appointed one of Nurhaci’s Five Ministers, the highest-ranking officials in the emerging Later Jin state. In the early reign of Nurhaci as the Khan, Hūrhan was entrusted with enforcing the agreement between Nurhaci and the Ming dynasty. After repeatedly intercepting and executing Ming personnel who illegally crossed the border, he became involved in a diplomatic dispute between the two states. In 1617, he joined Anfiyanggū in a campaign against the Sahaliyan tribe of Wild Jurchens, subduing numerous settlements and extending Later Jin influence in the lower Amur region.

During the Battle of Sarhū in 1619, Hūrhan fought in the campaigns that destroyed the Ming armies led by Du Song (杜松) and Ma Lin (馬林). He also played a decisive role in the defeat of the Ming-Joseon combined forces led by commander Liu Ting (劉綎), helping to ambush and annihilate his force. He later participated in Nurhaci’s capture of Shenyang and the defeat of Ming commander He Shixian (賀世賢).

Hūrhan reached through the military ranks to the hereditary position of Viscount Third-Class (三等子爵). He died in 1623 at the age of forty-eight, and Nurhaci personally attended his funeral, reflecting the high esteem in which he was held.
