= Anfiyanggū =

Manchu name
- Manchu script: ᠠᠨᡶᡳᠶᠠᠩᡤᡡ
- Möllendorff: anfiyanggū

Chinese name
- Chinese: 安费扬古
Transcriptions
Standard Mandarin
- Hanyu Pinyin: ān fèi yáng gǔ

Pronunciation respelling name
- Pronunciation respelling: Ahn-FEE-Yahng-Go

Šongkoro Baturu Anfiyanggū (1559–7 August 1622), was a Manchu official and one of the earliest companions of Nurhaci.

== Biography ==
=== Background ===
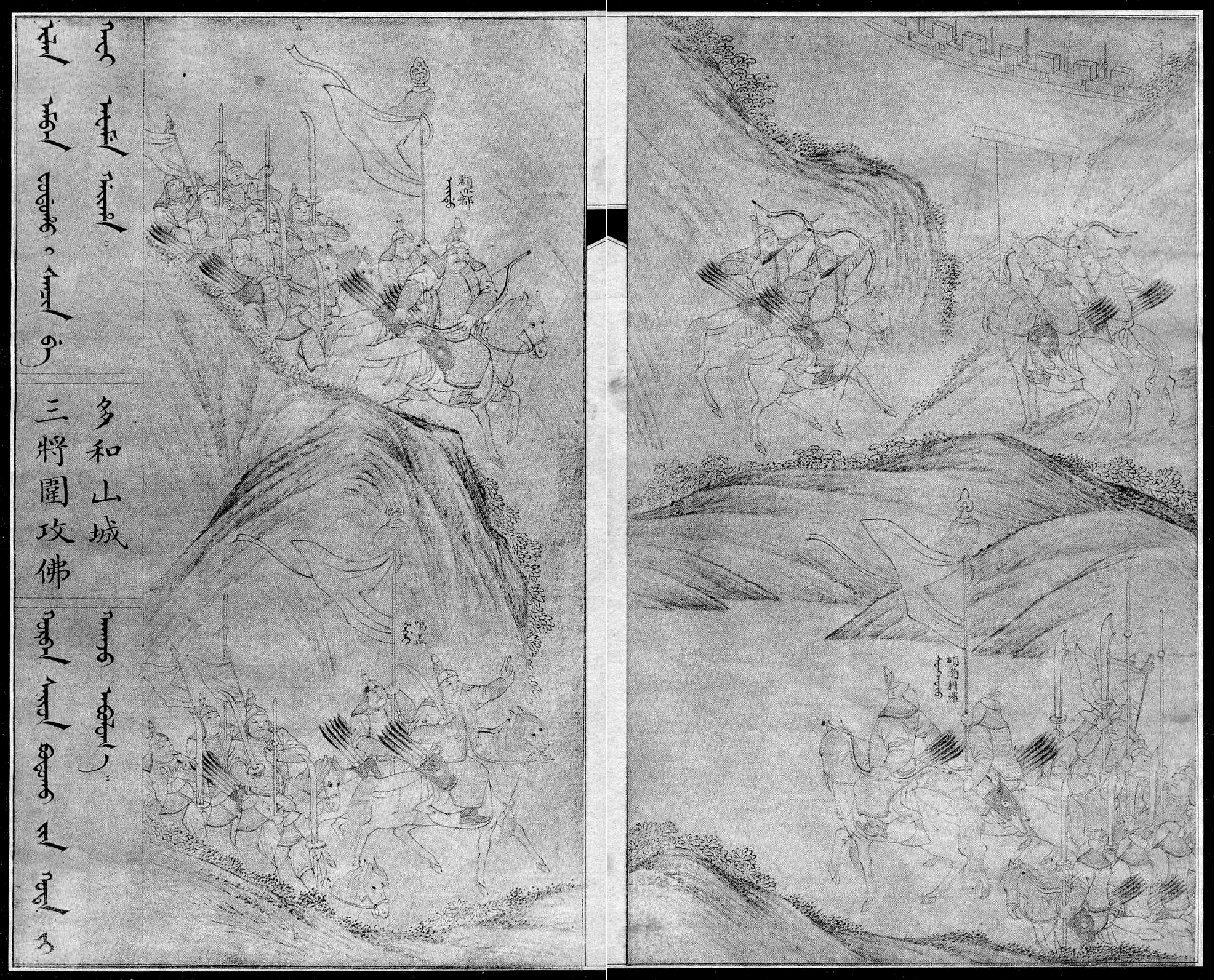
Anfiyanggū, recorded as Šongkoro, (commander at bottom right) in the Battle of Fodoho

His biographers state that he belonged to the Giorca (覺爾察), clan and that his father Wambulu (完布祿), remained loyal to Nurhaci despite efforts of the Janggiya (竟嘉) and Nimala (尼瑪蘭) people to tempt him to rebel. Behind this statement lies a bitter dissention in Nurhaci's own clan which the official Qing historians tried to conceal. There is no clan named Giolca among the 641 listed in the Genealogy of the Manchu Clans, (八旗滿洲氏族通譜 Baqi Manzhou shizu tungbu, 80 + 2 jüan, completed early in 1745). Giolca was the place in which Nurhaci's grand-uncle, Desikū 德世庫, had settled, and it seems probable that Anfiyanggū was one of Desikū's descendants. Janggiya and Nimala were similarly the homes of two other of Nurhaci's grand-uncles whose descendants were hostile to Nurhaci's plans for conquest.

=== Military service ===
Anfiyanggū joined Nurhaci in all the expeditions by which between 1583 and 1593 he subdued the smaller tribes round him and crushed his hostile relatives at Janggiya and Nimala. During a battle with Hada forces in 1593 Anfiyanggū saved Nurhaci's life, for which the title Šongkoro Baturu ("Gyrfalcon Warrior"), was conferred upon him. Attached to the Bordered Blue Banner, he took part in all of the larger campaigns of the next twenty years, and in 1616 with Nurhaci's proclamation of the Jin Dynasty, he was appointed as one of Nurhaci's five chief councilors in the newly organized administration, the other four being Eidu, Hūrhan, Fiongdon, and Hohori. He died one year after he had assisted in the capture of Shenyang and Liaoyang. In 1659 the posthumous name, Minzhuang (敏狀), was conferred upon him and a tablet was erected in memory of his services to the founding of the dynasty.

=== Legacy ===
Anfiyanggū, and his descendants held the hereditary captaincy of four companies in the first division of the Bordered Blue Banner. In memory of Anfiyanggū's exploits, the minor hereditary rank of Qingche Duwei was conferred on one of his sons (1650) and on a great-grandson (1713). Another son was killed in battle and was rewarded posthumously with the hereditary Qingche Duwei. A grandson, named Sunta (孫塔) (?–1666), was onetime president of the Board of Works (1656–60) and in 1664 was made a first class baron.
