= Inggūldai =

Qing envoy (1596–1648)

Chinese name
- Chinese: 英俄尔岱
Transcriptions
Standard Mandarin
- Hanyu Pinyin: yīng é ěr dài

Korean name
- Hangul: 용골대
- Hanja: 龍骨大
Transcriptions
- Revised Romanization: yonggoldae

Manchu name
- Manchu script: ᡳᠩᡤᡡᠯᡩ᠋ᠠᡳ
- Möllendorff: inggūldai

Pronunciation respelling name
- Pronunciation respelling: EENG-gol-dy

Inggūldai (1596–1648), also known as Yonggoldae in Joseon, was a Qing military commander, diplomat, and statesman of the Tatara clan from Manchu Plain White Banner. He distinguished himself in the Qing conquests of Sarhū, Shenyang-Liaoyang, Korea, Jinzhou-Songshan, eventually earning the hereditary rank of Duke Second Class (二等公爵). Having married a daughter of Abatai, he also held the title of Prince Consort (Doro Efu) and served as Banner commander and the first Minister of Revenue of the Qing dynasty. Inggūldai, along with Mafuta of Hada Nara, were the most involved Qing diplomats in Joseon where they were collectively known as the Yong-Ma Ijang (龍馬二將).

== Biography ==
Inggūldai was originally from Jakumu where his grandfather led 50 households to join Nurhaci's uprising. Inggūldai gained distinction at the Battle of Sarhū, and the captures of Kaiyuan, Shenyang, Tieling, and Liaoyang, where he was granted with the hereditary title of adaha hafan. During the 1629 campaign into Ming territory, he successfully defended Zunhua (遵化) against repeated Ming counterattacks, inflicting heavy casualties and compelling several nearby fortresses to surrender again to the Later Jin.

In 1631, following the establishment of the Six Ministries, Inggūldai was appointed the Minister of Revenue (戶部承政). He also undertook numerous diplomatic missions to Joseon Korea, negotiating grain supplies, announcing Hong Taiji's accession as emperor, and participating in the events leading to the Second Manchu invasion of Korea 1636–1637. After King Injo surrendered, Inggūldai and Mafuta supervised Qing-Joseon relations and, later in 1637, formally entitled Injo the King of Joseon as Qing's vassal.

Inggūldai was promoted to Banner Commander in 1639 and later took part in the sieges of Jinzhou and Songshan. He accompanied Dorgon's marching into China in 1644 and, following the Qing conquest of Beijing, became the first Minister of Revenue (戶部尚書) under the new Qing administration. He was promoted to Duke Second-Class in 1647 and died of illness in the following year.

Hong Taiji praised Inggūldai for his administrative ability and decisiveness despite his stubborn temperament, considering him superior to many other ministers. After Dorgon's death, however, he was posthumously implicated in the political purge against Dorgon's supporters, and his descendants' hereditary title was reduced to viscount. During the reign of the Kangxi Emperor, additional accusations related to banner administration were brought against him during the dominance of Oboi.

His son Itu succeeded the hereditary title of Viscount Third-Class (三等子爵).
