= Tunggiyan Gioro =

Manchu clan and family name

Manchu name
- Manchu script: ᡨᡠᠩᡤᡳᠶᠠᠨ ᡤᡳᠣᡵᠣ
- Möllendorff: tunggiyan gioro

Chinese name
- Chinese: 通颜觉罗氏
Transcriptions
Standard Mandarin
- Hanyu Pinyin: tōng yán jué luó shì

Pronunciation respelling name
- Pronunciation respelling: Toong-ghee-yahn Ghee-ore-oh

Tunggiyan Gioro is a Manchu clan and surname. As a branch of the Gioro clan, the members traditionally settled in Yarhū and concentrated in the Bordered Blue Banner. Its most distinguished lineage descended from Moohai.

== Biography ==
During the early Qing period, Moohai was awarded the hereditary rank of baitalabure hafan but was killed in action during the Battle of Jinzhou, receiving a posthumous promotion to Adaha hafan Second-Class. His descendants inherited the title over several generations, with members such as Tulai, Korkun, Monggoldai, Lojan, and Tushai distinguishing themselves in campaigns against the Dzungars and in the conquest of China. Other members of the family served as military and civil officials, including deputy commanders of the Imperial Guards, directors in the ministries, nirui janggin, and cabinet or ministry clerks.

Other branches of the Tunggiyan Gioro clan produced banner officials and military officers, including descendants of Turhun, Sujari, and Buyanju, who served as company commanders, imperial guards, assistant department directors, and clerks.

Following the fall of the Qing dynasty, members of the Tunggiyan Gioro clan generally adopted the sino surnames Zhao and Bu (布).

== See also ==
- Tunggiya
