= Donggo =

Manchu clan and family name

Manchu name
- Manchu script: ᡩᠣᠩᡤᠣ

Chinese name
- Chinese: 董鄂氏
Transcriptions
Standard Mandarin
- Hanyu Pinyin: dǒng è shì

Pronunciation respelling name
- Pronunciation respelling: DOONG-o

Donggo, a Manchu clan and surname, is often considered as one of the Eight Great Manchu Clans in Qing dynasty. Most of its members were descendants or kinsmen of Hohori, one of the Five Great Ministers who assisted Nurhaci in founding the Later Jin (後金開國五大臣). Originating from the Irgen Gioro clan of the Warka tribe, the family later settled at Donggo River, a Tunggiya River tributary, and became ruling chieftains of the area. Although numbering only nineteen households in the early period, the clan possessed twenty hereditary company commands within the Eight Banners.

During the Qing dynasty, the families of Hohori, Fiyanggū, and Alanju were particularly prominent. The Donggo clan maintained close ties with the Irgen Gioro clan, and some members, including Alanju and Bulanju siblings, were also recorded under that surname. Since descended from the Gioro clan, Donggo clansmen also shared the same anecdote of alleged connections to the House of Zhao of the Northern Song dynasty. After the fall of the Qing, descendants generally adopted Chinese surnames such as Dong (董), Zhao (趙), He (何), Tang (唐), E (鄂), Cheng (成), Xi (席), Tong (佟), Peng (彭), Qi (齊), Hong (紅), and Xu (許).

== Overview ==
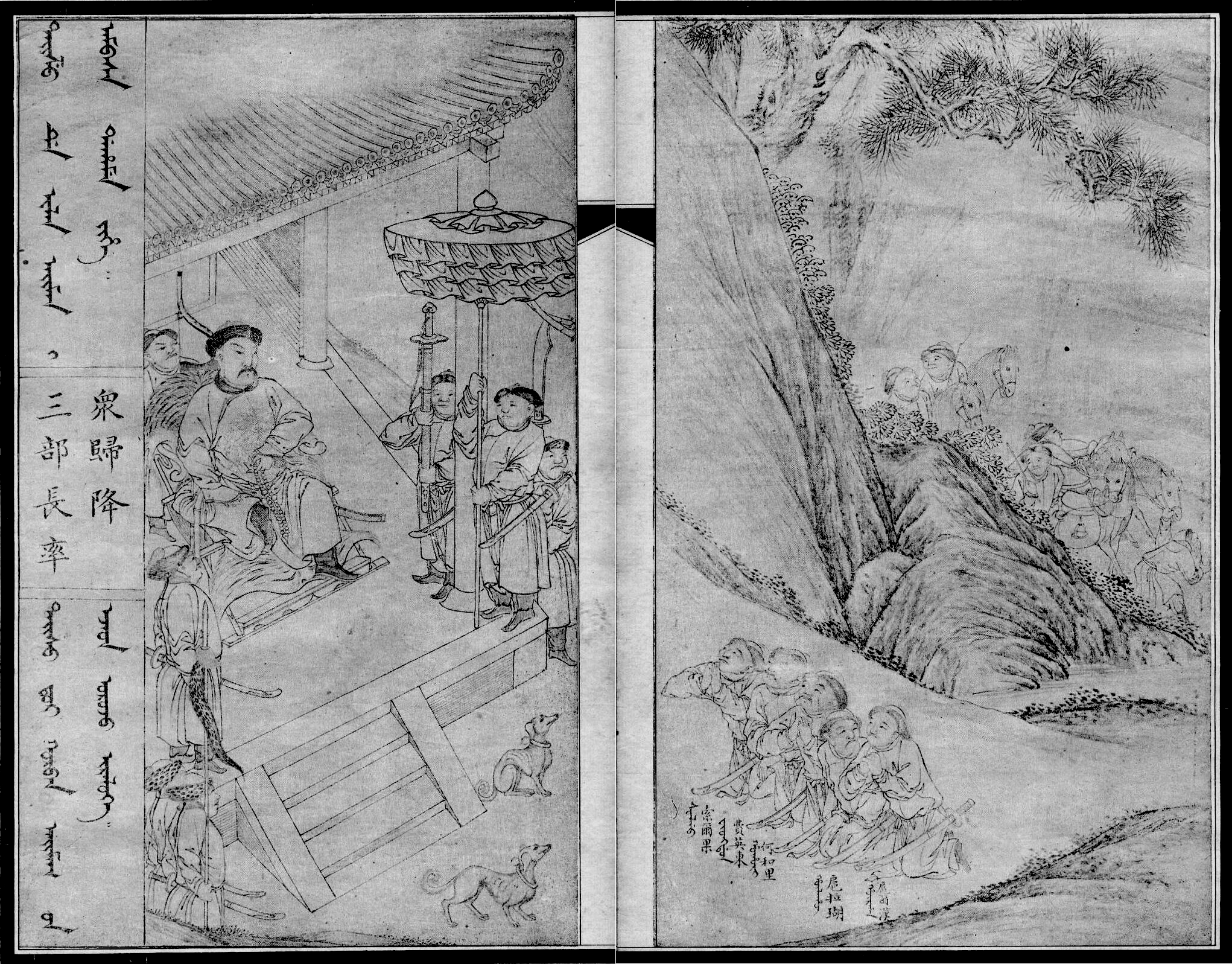
Manchu Veritable Records depicted the submission of Hohori (the person in the center among the five kneeling)

According to the Complete Genealogies of the Manchu Clans and Families of the Eight Banners (八旗滿洲氏族通譜), the Donggo clansmen were mainly distributed among six banners and largely consisted of Hohori's descendants and kinsmen. Hohori became one of Nurhaci’s right-hand man earning the title of Duke, and married Nurhaci’s eldest daughter. His descendants held numerous hereditary titles and military offices in addition. Notable members included Gali, Viceroy of Liangjiang; Galbi, Deputy Banner Commander of Xi'an; Hūšibu, a Banner commander; and Pengcun, who commanded Qing forces to victory against Russia in the Battle of Albazin.

The other notable family was the descendants of Luksu, Hohori's clansman. Luksu joined to Nurhaci with his brother Tunbu and 400 tribesmen. His descendants included great-granddaughter Empress Xiaoxian Duanjing and empress' younger brother Fiyanggū who served Grand Minister of the Imperial Guard and commander-in-chief in the campaign against Galdan and later promoted to Duke First Class (一等公爵). Other relatives also held hereditary titles and high offices.

Other notable descendants of Hohori's kinsmen include Baron Alanju and Tiebao, a minister and famous calligrapher.

General Zhao Chengjin (趙承金), a founding member of the People's Republic of China and PLA, was also a Donggo clansman.

== Gallery ==
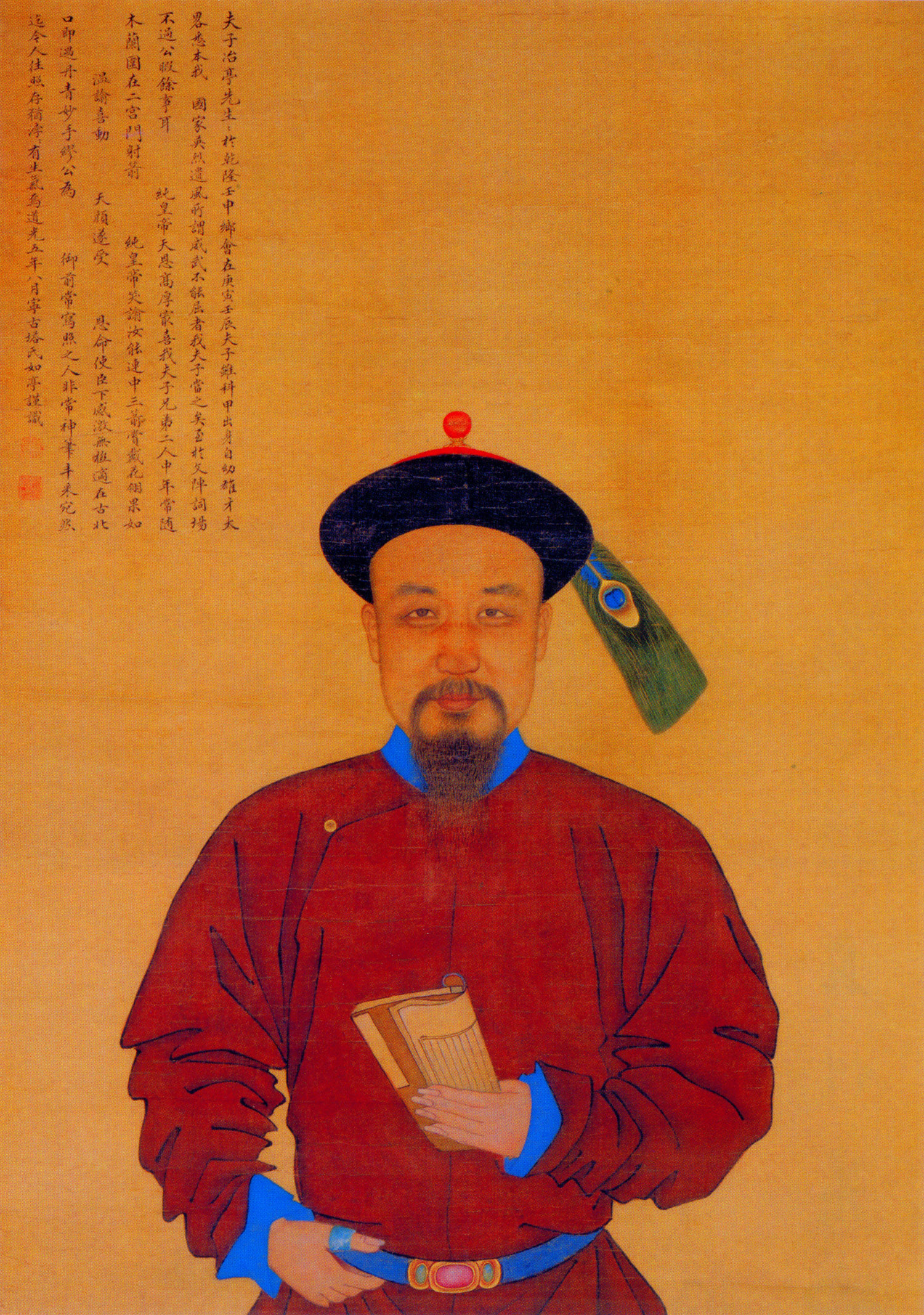
Tiebao, famous Qianlong-Jiaqing era calligrapher

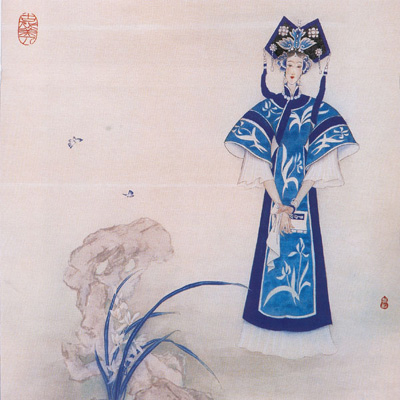
Empress Xiaoxian, Shunzhi Emperor's beloved consort
