= Hada Nara =

Manchu clan and family name

Manchu name
- Manchu script: ᡥᠠᡩ᠋ᠠ ᠨᠠᡵᠠ
- Möllendorff: hada nara

Chinese name
- Chinese: 哈达那拉氏
Transcriptions
Standard Mandarin
- Hanyu Pinyin: hā dá nà lā shì

Pronunciation respelling name
- Pronunciation respelling: HAH-dah-NAH-rah

Hada Nara is a one of the four major branches of the Nara clan and the ruling clan of Hada tribal nation (哈达國). According to the clan history, its ancestor Nacibulu, the founder of the Hūlun tribal confederation, was allegedly descended from the imperial family of the Jurchen Jin Dynasty. His descendants later established the tribal nations of Hada and Ula after the confederation's disintegration due to the invasion of the Mongol Khan Toghtoa Bukha. Under Wan Khan (王台), a sixth-generation descendant of Nacibulu, the Hada nation turned into the most powerful Jurchen tribe and was recognized by the Ming dynasty with the high honorary title of Longhu Jiangjun (龍虎將軍, Dragon-Tiger General) to oversee and ensure peace among all the tribes. However, following Wan's death, Hada rapidly declined due to internal conflicts and was eventually conquered by Nurhaci, with its clan and tribesmen incorporated into the Eight Banners.

During the Qing dynasty, several members of the clan held hereditary noble titles, including barons and minor hereditary titles. After the fall of the Qing, descendants generally adopted the Sino surnames Na (那), Wan (萬), Wang (王), He (赫), and Ye (葉).

== Overview ==
The ruling Hada beile family was distributed among several banners. Its last ruler, Urgūdai, surrendered to Nurhaci and became an imperial son-in-law. His descendants and clansmen produced numerous officials and hereditary nobles. Juwenei (卓內), another grandson of Wan, was bestowed the imperial surname Gioro whose great-grandson Amida became the Governor of Gansu.

Another prominent branch descended from Wangju Wailan (王忠), Wan's uncle and former Hada beile. Wangju Wailan's great-grandson Subahai joined Nurhaci with two hundred followers and his descendants became high-ranking generals and ministers, including Cige (齊格), a minister and banner commander against the Dzungars.

Suhede, a descendant of Wangju Wailan's granduncle, descended Minister of War and Baron Gadahun (噶達渾) and Mafuta, Minister of Revenue and the most crucial ambassador of Korean affairs along with Inggūldai of Tatara clan. Other descendants of Suhede received minor hereditary titles and served as military commanders, ministers, and banner officials in the Qing court.

Besides the ruling clan, several unrelated Hada Nara families also held minor hereditary titles and became officials through military merit during the Qing period.
