= Mafuta =

Qing envoy (fl. 17th century)

Chinese name
- Chinese: 马福塔
Transcriptions
Standard Mandarin
- Hanyu Pinyin: mǎ fú tǎ

Korean name
- Hangul: 마부대
- Hanja: 馬夫大
Transcriptions
- Revised Romanization: mabudae

Manchu name
- Manchu script: ᠮᠠᡶᡠᡨᠠ
- Möllendorff: mafuta

Pronunciation respelling name
- Pronunciation respelling: MAH-foo-tah

Mafuta (?-1640), also known as Mabudae in Joseon, was a Qing official, military commander, and diplomat of Hada Nara clan from the Manchu Plain Yellow Banner, served as Minister of Revenue and the most involved diploma in Joseon affairs along with Inggūldai knowing in Korean as the Yong-Ma Ijang (龍馬二將).

== Biography ==
Mafuta was originally from Hada where his father Yahu led fifteen households to join Nurhaci's forces. His elder brother Mandarhan was a Banner Commander. Mafuta became one of the Qing court's principal envoys to Joseon Korea, participating in trade negotiations, diplomatic missions, and military operations on the Korean frontier, and escorted imperial communications between the Qing and Joseon courts.

During the Second Manchu invasion of Korea (1636–1637), Mafuta served in the advance force of the Qing army. After King Injo retreated to Namhansanseong, Mafuta twice entered the fortress under imperial orders to denounce the king's resistance and demand his surrender. Following Injo's surrender, Mafuta and Inggūldai escorted the king back to the capital and later, in 1637, formally entitled Injo the King of Joseon as Qing's vassal.

Mafuta continued to serve as a senior official of the Ministry of Revenue (戶部承政) and undertook further diplomatic missions to Korea, including the 1639 investiture of Queen Jangnyeol and the inspection of the Samjeondo Monument commemorating Qing victory over Joseon. Mafuta died in 1640 while serving as the Minister of Revenue.
