= Dzungar conquest of Tibet =

Military conflict in China, 1716–1720

- Part of the Dzungar–Qing Wars
Date	1716–1720
Location	Tibet, China
Result	Dzungar victory
Territorial changes	Brief Dzungar conquest of Tibet until Qing expedition

Belligerents
Dzungar Khanate	Khoshut Khanate; Qing dynasty

Commanders and leaders
(Dzungar Khanate) Tsewang Khan (Dzungar Khanate) Tseren Dhondup (Dzungar Khanate) Coimpel (Dzungar Khanate) Tobci (Dzungar Khanate) Sangji (Dzungar Khanate) Dugar Zaysan	(Khoshut Khanate) Lha-bzang Khan † (Khoshut Khanate) Surza Tayiji (Khoshut Khanate) Lobsangachi Tayiji (Qing dynasty) Erentei † (Tibet) Khangchenné (Tibet) Polhané Topgyé (Tibet) Arongpa (Tibet) Bumtangpa †

Units involved
Dzungar cavalry	500–2,000 Khoshut forces 7,000 Tibetan forces 7,000 Qing bannermen

Strength
6,000–10,000	14,500–16,000

Casualties and losses
Light	Heavy

The Dzungar conquest of Tibet or the Dzungar conquest of Central Tibet was a military conflict fought between the Dzungar Khanate and the Khoshut Khanate, supported by the Qing dynasty, from 1716 to 1720. The conquest by the Dzungars was the last Mongol invasion of Tibet, as the Dzungars invaded the region over the Qing influence of Tibet. The conquest was led by Tseren Dhondup, under the authority of his brother and the ruler of the Dzungar Khanate, Tsewang Rabtan Khan.

During the campaign, the Dzungars fought against the Khoshuts and Tibetans and captured the city of Lhasa, leading to the death of Lha-bzang Khan. The conquest also ended the Khoshut Khanate, as their Khan had died and their rule had perished from the capture of Lhasa.

The Dzungar conquest was short-lived with about the occupation of the region lasting from 1717 to 1720. As which the Dzungars established a military government in the region and influenced the Tibetan military.

In 1720, the Qing dynasty sent a large force under the leadership of Prince Xun, Yunti to conquer Tibet. The larger expedition expelled the Dzungars and directly led to the Qing rule of Tibet, up until the Xinhai Revolution.

== Background ==
In 1637, the chief of the Khoshuts, Torobaikhu (Güshi Khan) with the support of the founder of the Dzungar Khanate, Erdeni Batur defeated the Khalkha Mongol forces of Choghtu Khong Tayiji, in the Battle of the Bloody Hills. Soon, they visited Lhasa in 1638, which the 5th Dalai Lama granted them titles. Erdeni Batur received the title Khong Tayiji and departed back to the Dzungar Khanate after his marriage with Torobaikhu's daughter, Amin-Dara.

Meanwhile, Torobaikhu received the title, Güshi Khan and Holder of the Doctrine Chogyal. This led to migration of the Khoshuts to Amdo, about 100,000 uluses arrived at the region. Later, spies under the 5th Dalai Lama reported to Güshi Khan about a possible coalition against him. As the Tsangpa dynasty and the Beri Kingdom attempted to create one. Güshi Khan then proceeded to invade the region of Kham and Ü-Tsang, which unified the region of Tibet and the establishment of the 5th Dalai Lama's rule over Tibet. Eventually, the Ganden Phodrang was established as the form of the government, up until 1959.

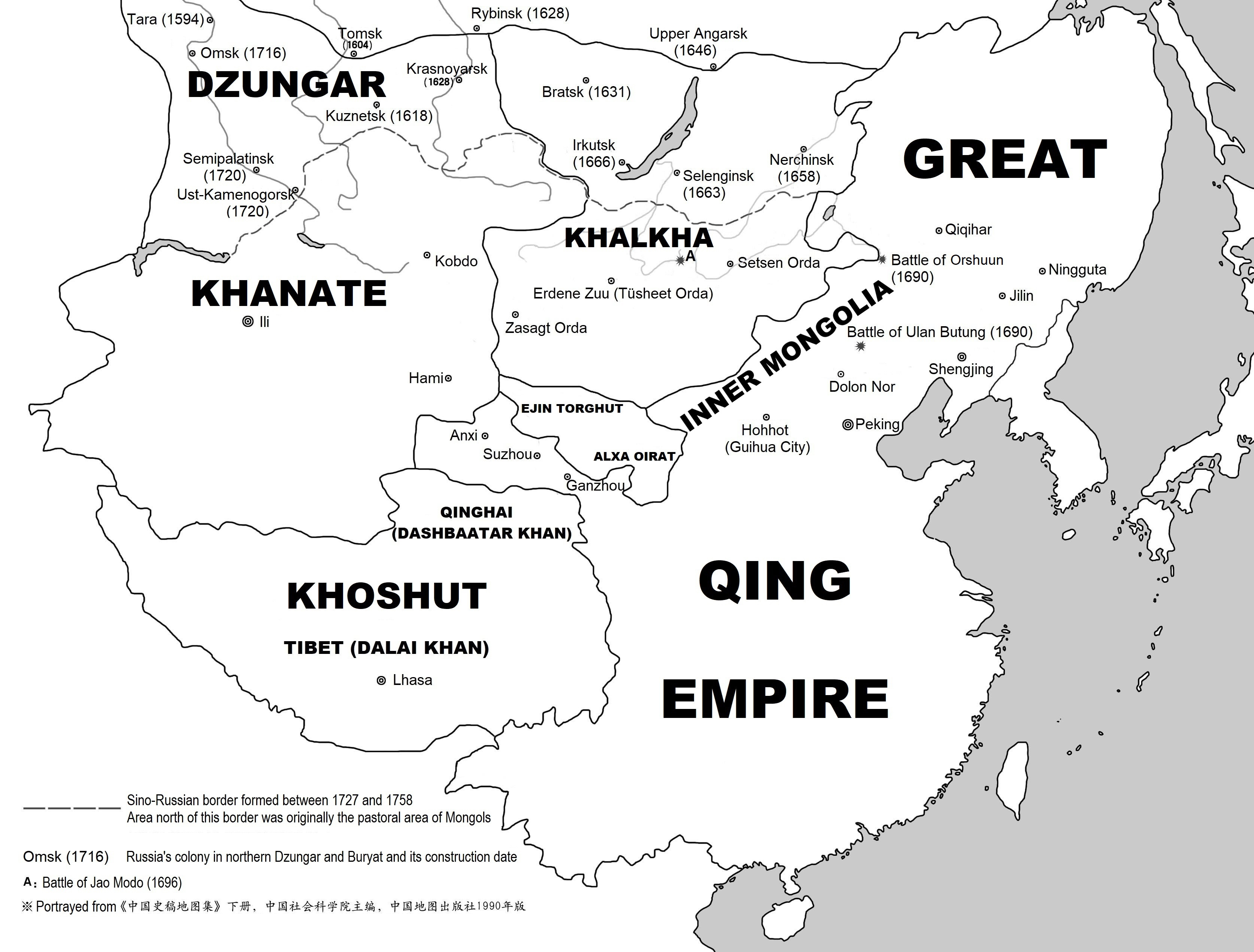
Map of the Khoshut Khanate, in 1689.

In 1682, the 5th Dalai Lama died, which his death was later concealed by the Desi Sangye Gyatso. Later, he sent a complaint letter to the Kangxi Emperor, stating that the Khoshuts are uncontrollable. This led to the Qing annexation of modern day Qinghai and eastern Kham. Later, the Dzungar Khanate sent envoys to the Kangxi Emperor to notify about the death of the 5th Dalai Lama. In turn, Kangxi sent envoys to Lhasa to enthrone as Tsangyang Gyatso the 6th Dalai Lama. However, the 6th Dalai Lama enjoyed alcohol, prostitution and poetry rather than a monastic life.

In 1698, tensions grew between the Qing and the Khoshuts over the control of Tibet. Later, on 28th of January, 1701, Eight Banners of about 2,000 bannermen under the leadership of Manpi fought the Khoshuts in Dartsedo, and the Khoshuts faced heavy casualties during the battle. In 1703, under the pressure of the Kangxi Emperor and Lha-bzang Khan, the 6th Dalai Lama was deposed.

Desi Sangye Gyatso attempts to assassinate Lha-bzang by poison, but failed to do so as he survived.

== Conquest ==
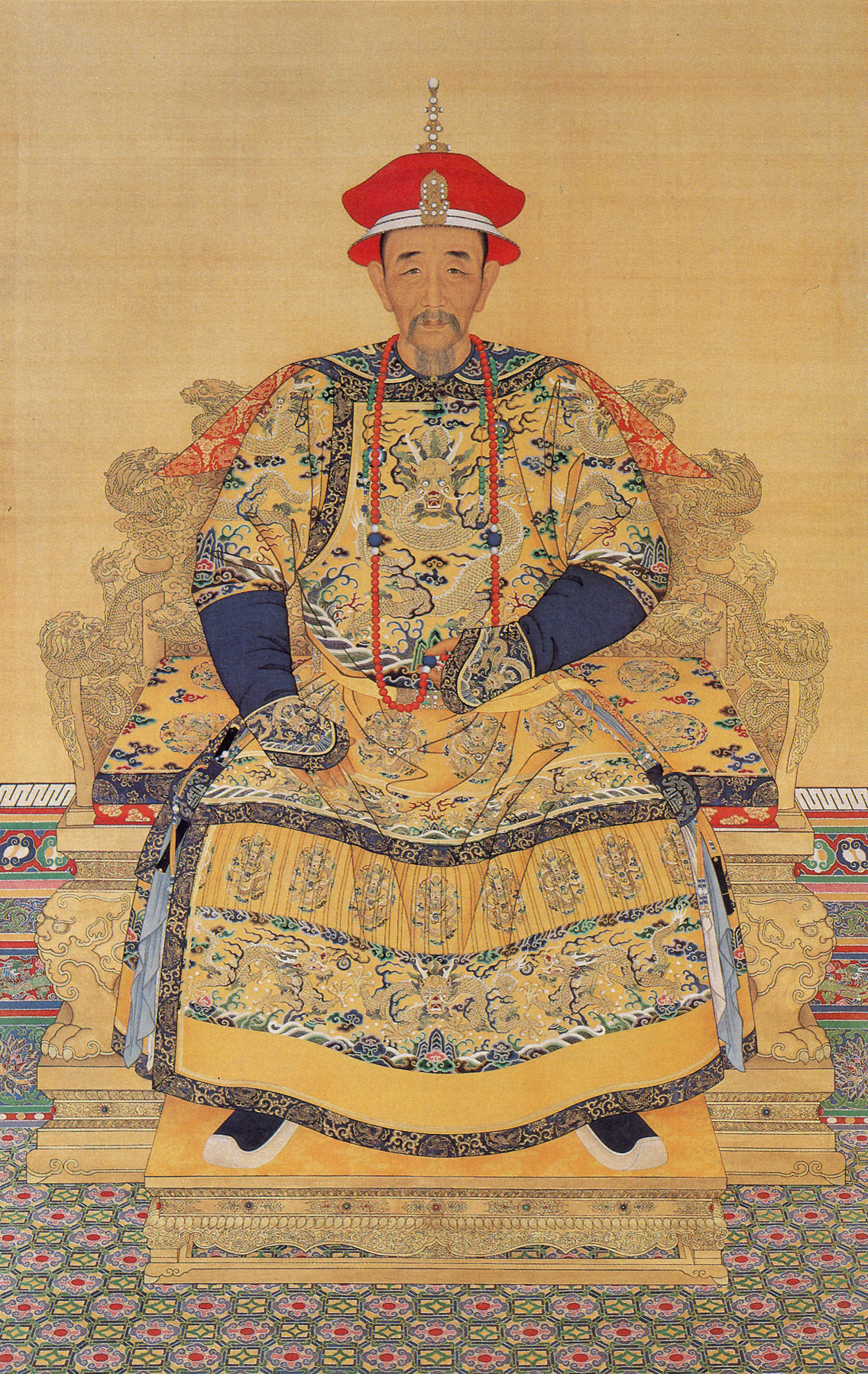
Portrait of Kangxi Emperor in Court Dress. The Emperor of the Qing dynasty.

The Dzungar invaded it to secure two entries to Qinghai Lake, as Tsewang Rabtan Khan intended to capture Ngari and Hami. Khangchenné, who stationed in Ngari, reported the Dzungar invasion in Central Tibet to Lha-zhang Khan. This led to abandonment by travelling by the Ngari and the Dzungars were switching to a new pathway. Later the Dzungars pillaged Nagtsang, as they traveled from Keriyang to Nagtsang. The Dzungars faced heavy attrition due to long travel from the new path. The Dzungars soon established their military camps on Nagtsang with about 3,000 to 4,000 men in total. Meanwhile, Lha-bzang sent 100 men to scout the military camp, which later led to a military skirmish in Lake Tengri. Later, Lha-bzang Khan fortified the same lake and together with his son, Surza Tayiji, assembled an army of about 10,000 Khoshut–Tibetan army, with about 2,000 Khoshut forces and 7,000 Tibetan forces.

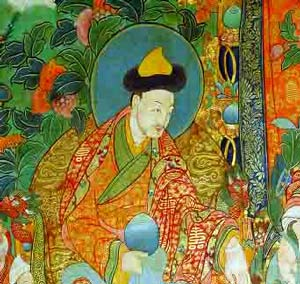
Mural of Lha-bzang Khan, the last Khan of the Khoshut Khanate.

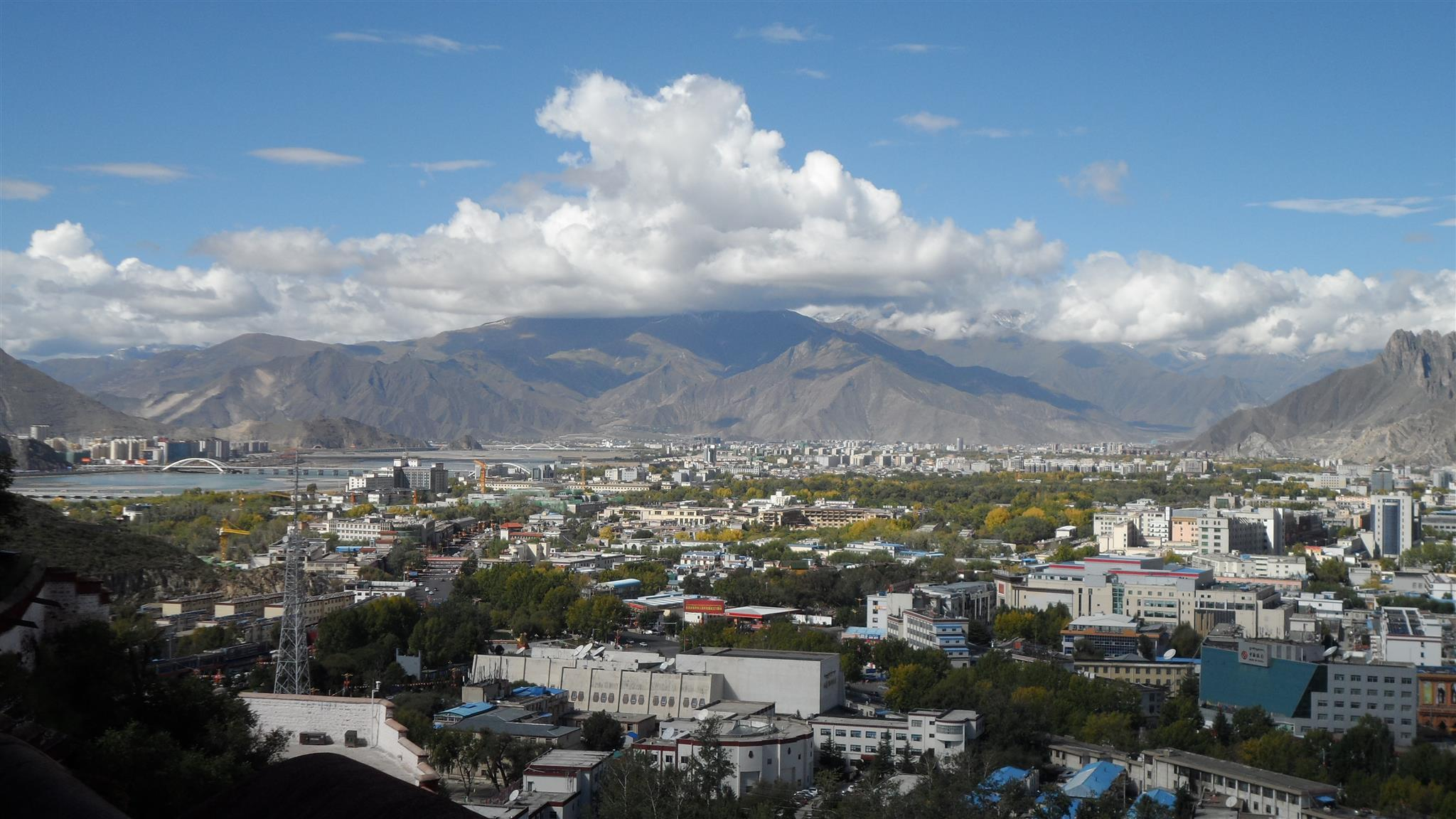
View of city of Lhasa, from the view of Potala Palace.

According to French historian, René Grousset, in the Summer of 1717, after the Dzungar arrival on Tibet, Lha-bzang Khan held the Dzungar army in Namtso for about 3 months. However, he was forced to retreat to Lhasa as he was outnumbered. He soon fortified Potala Palace. The Dzungars were described as "ate dog's flesh and had no support" according to Shi Yide. While a Jesuit missionary, Ippolito Desideri described Tseren Dhondup similar to Alexander the Great of Macedon. Despite this, the Qing army of about 100,000 did not mobilize to Tibet, as they expected for the Dzungars would not capture Lhasa due to attrition. They were later sent as Lha-bzang requested for Mobilization, which led to Erentei's mobilization to Tibet with about 7,000 men.

On August 25th of 1717, the Dzungars passed through the Largin pass and fought a Khoshut army of about 500 men. They faced light casualties and soon pillaged the Kundui Lama's monastery. Later, Lha-bzang Khan, Surza Tayiji and Lobsangachi Tayiji with about 10,500 men attacked the Dzungar army of about 5,000 men. However, despite outnumbering their army, the Khoshuts lost as the Dzungars were only suffering light casualties. The Dzungar army soon reached the city of Lhasa by October 8th of 1717. Later, a Tibetan commander, Arongpa attempted to ambush the Dzungars. However, the ambush failed as the Dzungars were informed of possible attack on their camp. Polhané Sönam Topgyé attempted another attack on the Dzungars, which failed again as the personal attendee of Polhané and a Tibetan commander, Bumtangpa were killed in action.

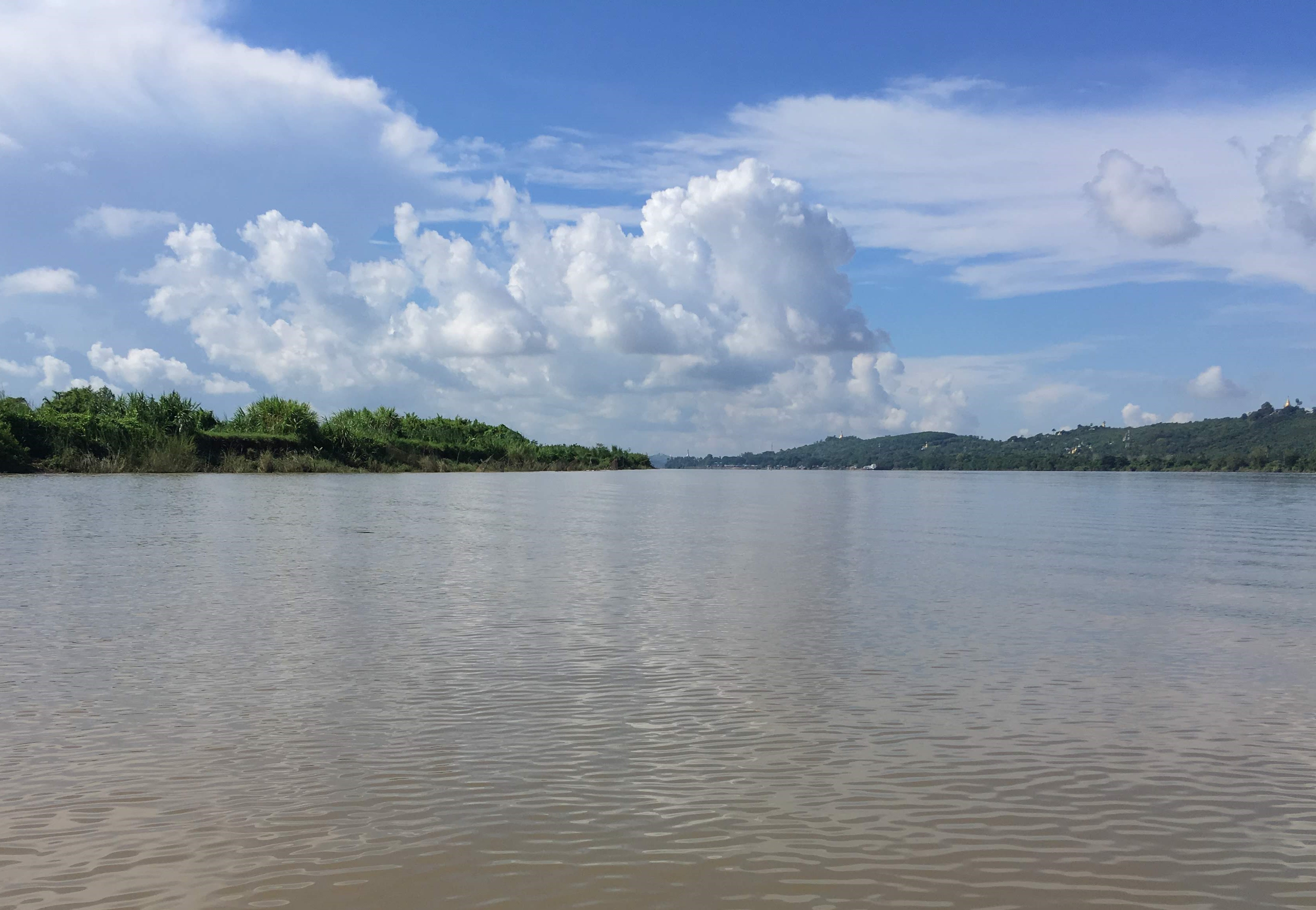
The Salween River, or Khara Us (Anglicized as Kela Usa) in Mongolian.

Soon, on November 30th of 1717, Lhasa was attacked by Tseren Dhondup, as he looted monastaries and massacred the city's population. Tseren Dhondup also deposed the Dalai Lama pretender, Yeshe Gyatso and installed the 7th Dalai Lama. However, he did not bring the 7th Dalai Lama to Lhasa, which lost the trust of the Gelug elites.

Later on December 2nd of 1717, Potala Palace was attacked, subsequently leading to the death of Lha-bzang Khan and the collapse of the Khoshut Khanate. Soon, Erentei's forces arrived on the Salween River or the Kela Us, which the Dzungar army encircled the Qing army and destroyed the Qing relief forces the Battle of the Salween River, near Xining.

== Aftermath ==
After the Dzungar conquest, 300,000 Qing forces under the leadership of Yinti was assembled in Xining. While Tseren Dhondup feared any retaliation from his brother, Tsewang Rabtan Khan. Soon, the Qing expedition were able to liberate Tibet from the Dzungars, as it consisted of Han Chinese–Khalkha Mongol–Upper Mongol forces. After the liberation, the Ganden Phodrang aligned themselves to the Qing authority, as the Dzungars had pillaged temples and monastaries of the Karmapa and the Nyingmapa sect, as Tseren Dhondup favored the Gelugpa sect.

The conquest had also influenced the Tibetan military, as the Dzungar's military tactics of active use of firearms and lances as well as "Zamburak" a cannon mounted on a camel were introduced. Which, a civil war in Tibet from 1727 to 1728 had used Dzungar cannons artillery warfare and guerilla warfare. The Dzungar military government in Tibet also started production of cannons for their troops after the Qing arrival at Central Tibet. As they extracted iron from Chamdo and used it for the production of the Dzungar weaponry. By an account by a Dzungar fugitive, Tegüs, the Dzungar army of Tseren Dhondup had about 9 cannons and later buried five of them and gave the rest to Dashi Tsepa.

Furthermore, the Dzungar forces' use of lances also influenced the Tibetan army, as it influenced Polhané for the use of lances by practising the use of the weaponry along with muskets, artillery and archery on a daily basis on the Nagtsang region campaign, in 1723. The use of hand-to-hand combat used by Polhané and his forces were changed to the Dzungar weaponry. The Dzungars had also created new routes to Tibet during their invasion, use of military camps and fortifications on mountainous terrain to efficiently use firearms and the Dzungar introduction of weaponry from Gunpoweder empires.
