= Hohori =

Manchu name
- Manchu script: ᡥᠣᡥᠣᡵᡳ
- Möllendorff: hohori

Chinese name
- Chinese: 何和礼
Transcriptions
Standard Mandarin
- Hanyu Pinyin: hé hé lǐ

Pronunciation respelling name
- Pronunciation respelling: HOH-hoh-ree

Hohori (1561-1624), a member of Donggo clan and Plain Red Banner, was the chieftain of the Donggo tribe who later joined Nurhaci's forces and became one of his most important ministers and generals during the rise of Jianzhou Jurchen and founding of Later Jin Khanate.

== Biography ==
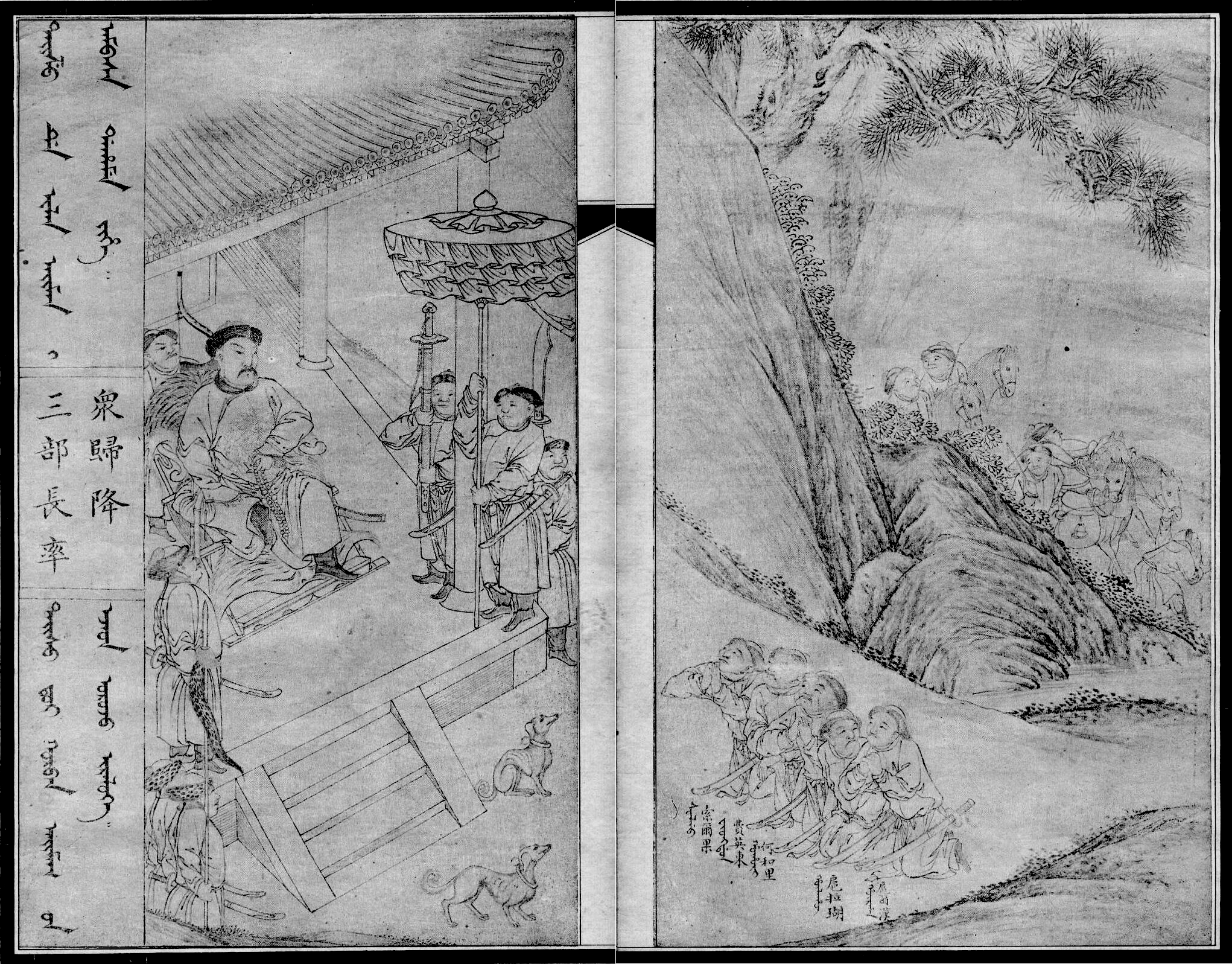
Manchu Veritable Records depicted the submission of Hohori (the person in the center among the five kneeling)

Hohori's ancestors were members of Gioro clan in Warka but later relocated to Donggo thus changed its clan and surname. During the reign of Hohori's grandfather, Donggo tribe increased its military strength and became a rival who frequently fought against Aisin Gioro clan supported by the Hada tribal nation at the moment.

Hohori became the Donggo chieftain when Nurhaci first launched his campaign. Nurhaci heard of Hohori's reputation and the strength of Donggo troops and sought to win him over with exceptional courtesy. In 1588, Hohori led his people to join Nurhaci. Nurhaci married his eldest daughter to him. However, Hohori's original wife was unhappy about the arranged marriage. She led her clansmen and troops attached to demanded battle with Hohori, but Nurhaci personally persuaded her to retreat.

When the Eight Banners system was first created, Hohori and his followers were incorporated into the Plain Red Banner, where he was appointed Banner commander. Hohori distinguished himself in Nurhaci’s campaigns against the Ula, Woji, and Ming forces, and was particularly instrumental in the conquest of Ula. In 1616, he was appointed one of the Five Founding Ministers of the Later Jin Khanate (後金開國五大臣). He subsequently participated in the victories at Sarhū and the captures of Shenyang and Liaoyang, for which he was awarded the hereditary rank of Viscount Third-Class (三等子爵).

He died in 1624 at the age of sixty-four. Nurhaci deeply mourned his death, as Hohori was the last one alive among the Five Founding Ministers, and regarding Hohori as one of his closest companions. He was later posthumously elevated to Duke Third Class in Hong Taiji's reign, granted the posthumous name Wenshun (溫順, "Gentle and Dutiful"), and further honored with the additional title Yongqin (勇勤, “Brave and Diligent”) in Yongzheng era.
