= Fiyanggū (Donggo) =

Manchu name
- Manchu script: ᡶᡳᠶᠠᠩᡤᡡ
- Möllendorff: fiyanggū

Chinese name
- Chinese: 费扬古
Transcriptions
Standard Mandarin
- Hanyu Pinyin: fèi yáng gǔ

Pronunciation respelling name
- Pronunciation respelling: FEE-yahng-go

Fiyanggū (1645-1701), a member of Donggo clan assigned to the Manchu Plain White Banner, was the son of Count Third Class Ešo and younger brother of Empress Xiaoxian Duanjing. He inherited his title at the age of fourteen and became prominence as a Qing military commander during the reign of the Kangxi Emperor.

== Biography ==
During the Revolt of the Three Feudatories, Fiyanggū participated the campaigns in Jiangxi and Hunan, defeating the forces of Wu Sangui and his generals. For his achievements, he was promoted to Minister of the Imperial Guard (領侍衛內大臣) and became a member of the Imperial Deliberative Council (議政王大臣會議).

He is best known for his crucial role in the Qing wars against Dzungar's Galdan Boshugtu Khan. In 1690, he participated in the Qing victory as a subordinate of Prince Fuquan at the Battle of Ulan Butung. In 1696, he was appointed Grand General (大將軍) and commander-in-chief of Qing's western armies in the Kangxi Emperor’s three-pronged campaign against Galdan. Coordinating with the emperor’s forces, Fiyanggū pursued the Dzungars and won a decisive victory at the Battle of Jao Modo, destroying much of Galdan’s army and forcing him to flee. The Kangxi Emperor highly praised Fiyanggū’s leadership, regarding him as one of the empire’s most capable commanders. In 1697, while preparing for a final campaign, Fiyanggū was informed that Galdan had died. He subsequently returned to Beijing, was promoted to Duke First Class (一等公爵), and resumed his post as Minister of the Imperial Guard.

In 1701, while accompanying the Kangxi Emperor on an imperial tour, Fiyanggū fell ill. The emperor personally visited him, bestowed gifts, and arranged his return to the capital. However, Fiyanggū died shortly afterward and was posthumously honored with the title Xiangzhuang (襄壯, "Martial and Stalwart"). His son Centai inherited his hereditary rank.
