= Battle of the Salween River =

1718 battle

- Part of the Dzungar conquest of Tibet of Dzungar–Qing Wars
Date	September 1718
Location	Nagqu, Tibet, China
Result	Dzungar victory

Belligerents
Qing Dynasty	Dzungar Khanate

Commanders and leaders
Erentei †	Tseren Dhondup

The Battle of the Salween River (Chinese: 喀喇烏蘇之戰) was fought in September 1718 close to the Nagqu (i.e., Salween River) in Tibet, between an expedition of the Qing dynasty to Lhasa and a Dzungar Khanate force that blocked its path.

After Tsering Dhondup conquered Tibet in 1717 on the orders of his cousin, the Dzungar Khong Tayiji Tsewang Rabtan, the Qing Kangxi Emperor ordered his generals to muster an army and expel the Dzungars and their supporters from Tibet but the enormous distances and logistical difficulties prevented an immediate reaction. By 1718 the Qing were mustering an expedition in Xining made up of Chinese and Muslim soldiers. The Chinese took the shortest route to Lhasa which took them west of Xining and through a deserted area to Lhasa.

The long journey through a deserted country exhausted the expedition's supplies and sickened the soldiers so as to make Erentei halt the march in Dam near the Salween River some 1,000 kilometres (620 mi) from Xining, a place not far from Lhasa. There they built a stone fort and foraged the countryside. Alerted of the Chinese presence the Dzungars mustered their militias and marched to meet the Chinese. Both forces fought in the open field but the Dzungars killed Erentei during the battle and the Chinese were pushed back into their camp where the Oirats and Tibetans kept them under a tight siege. As the siege wore on the Chinese were forced to eat the bodies of their own dead comrades after having exhausted their supplies and eaten their own horses.

The Chinese sought to negotiate a retreat with the Dzungars and obtained help from some of the Tibetan lamas to mediate between them and the Dzungar commander Tsering Dhondub to allow them to leave the camp and return north to Qing territory. The Dzungars agreed but when the Chinese got out of the camp they massacred them.

In 1720, a larger expedition force sent by Kangxi Emperor entered Lhasa, expelling the Dzungars from Tibet and establishing the Qing rule in Tibet.

== See also ==
- Chinese expedition to Tibet (1720)
- Tibet under Qing rule

== Sources ==
- Desideri, Ippolito (2010). Mission to Tibet:The Extraordinary Eighteenth-Century Account of Father Ippolito Desideri, S.J. Wisdom Publications. ISBN 978-0-86171-676-0.
- Perdue, Peter (2005). China Marches West: The Qing Conquest of Central Eurasia. Harvard University Press. ISBN 978-0-674-01684-2.
