= Darkhan (name) =

Darkhan is a given name and surname. People associated with this name include:

- Tygyn Darkhan
- Darkhan Juzz
- Darkhan Yessengali
- Darkhan Kydyrali
- Darkhan Bayakhmetov
