= Darkhan =

Darkhan (Mongolian: Дархан) is a craftsman or an honorary privilege in the Mongolian language.

It can also refer to:

- "a generous king" in the Kazakh language.

- in Turkic, it is a title (a position at the khan's court) that grants a person the right to freely enter and leave the khan's tent. Darkhan had a right of 9-fold pardon, that could be inherited through 9 generations. This title also meant that a person was free from tax obligations.

- as an adjective in the Kazakh language it also has a meaning of "spacious" or "unlimited".

- "Darkhan" means "the blacksmith" among buryat culture. Traditionally, buryats believed that the first blacksmith(darkhan) lived in Heaven and he had a gift of forging happiness between husband and wife.

== Places ==
=== Mongolia ===
- Darkhan-Uul Province, an aimag (province)
- Darkhan (city), the capital of Darkhan-Uul Province
- Darkhan, Khentii, a sum (district) of the Khentii aimag
- Darhan Muminggan United Banner, a county level division of Baotou City, Inner Mongolia
- Horqin Left Middle Banner, also known as Darhan Banner

=== Kyrgyzstan ===
- Darkhan, Issyk-Kul, a village

== See also ==
- Darkhan (name)
