= Mampi (Irgen Gioro) =

Mampi (Manchu: ᠮᠠᠮᡦᡳ, romanized: mampi; d. 1700) was a Qing official of the Irgen Gioro clan and a member of the Plain Blue Banner. He served in the campaigns against Galdan during the reign of the Kangxi Emperor and later rose to the position of the Commander of the Mongol Plain Blue Banner.

== Biography ==
Mampi's family was originally from Hingkan. His great-grandfather, Juhuda, was a local chieftain who joined Nurhaci's forces. Mampi inherited a hereditary nirui janggin (世管佐領) and later participating in the Qing-Russian border negotiations at Nerchinsk and was appointed a director of Lifanyuan (the Court of Colonial Affairs, 理籓院).

In 1690, Mampi was sent to negotiate with Galdan and joined the Qing army at the Battle of Ulan Butung afterwards, where he helped defeat the Dzungars and was awarded a First-Class Merit Medal (頭等功牌). He was later promoted to Vice Minister of the Lifanyuan (理籓院侍郎). During the Kangxi Emperor's campaign against Galdan in 1696, he reinforced the army of General Fiyanggū and participated in the victory at the Battle of Jao Modo. After Galdan's defeat and death, Mampi was recalled to Beijing, appointed a deliberative minister, and granted the hereditary rank of tuwašara hafan.

In 1700, Mampi was sent to Sichuan to pacify local chieftains and assisted in the recovery of Dartsedo. He successfully persuaded several tribal leaders in the Yarlung Tsangpo River region and proposed their incorporation into the Qing administrative system. Later that year, he was promoted to Commander of the Mongol Plain Blue Banner. Due to illness, he retired while retaining his rank and died shortly afterward.

His grandson Suchang, Mingshan (明山) and great-grandson Fugang (富綱) all later served as Viceroy.
