= Pronunciation respelling =

Orthography based on pronunciation

A pronunciation respelling is a regular phonetic respelling of a word that has a standard spelling but whose pronunciation according to that spelling may be ambiguous, which is used to indicate the pronunciation of that word. Pronunciation respellings are sometimes seen in word dictionaries.

The term should not be confused with pronunciation spelling which is an ad hoc spelling of a word that has no standard spelling. Most of these are nonce words though some have achieved a certain amount of standardization, e.g., the informal use of the word gonna to represent an informal pronunciation of going to.

== Respelling ==
Pronunciation respellings may be used informally to indicate the pronunciation of foreign words or those whose spelling is irregular or insufficient for the reader to deduce the pronunciation. In such cases, typeface, punctuation or letter case may also be used, e.g., to indicate stress or syllabication of the word. For example:

"Diarrhoea" is pronounced DYE-uh-REE-uh

This offers a sometimes intuitive alternative to systems like the International Phonetic Alphabet, which offers precise descriptions but must be learned. For example:

"Diarrhoea" is pronounced /daɪəˈriːə/

However, respelling relies on the writer's encoded mapping to the same phonemes as the reader's; e.g.

Föhn is pronounced "Fern"

might be adequate for certain non-rhotic readers but not rhotic ones.

Unlike the IPA, respelling systems are often specific to the works in which they appear. The English-language Wikipedia, for example, has its own respelling system (available at Help:Pronunciation respelling key) which may or may not match that used on other Wikipedias or in other contexts.

== Literary dialect ==
Pronunciation spellings are sometimes used in narratives to represent nonstandard dialects or idiolects to create an impression of backwardness or illiteracy in the speaker. This is called literary dialect, often called eye dialect, though the latter term used to be applied only if the resulting pronunciation is the same as the standard one. For example:

"Pleez, mistur," said the beggar.

== Other uses ==
Pronunciation spellings as deliberate misspellings may be used for humorous effect. The origin of the word okay is disputed, but the most common view is that it derives from "Oll Korrect", an 1830s comical spelling of "All Correct".

Such spellings may also be used for branding, e.g., "Lite" foods, Froot Loops. See also sensational spelling.

== See also ==
- Pronunciation respelling for English
- Heterography
