= A Pronouncing Dictionary of American English =

1944 linguistics book by Kenyon and Knott

- 1953 edition
- Author: John Samuel Kenyon; Thomas A. Knott
- Language: English
- Published: 1944
- Publisher: G. & C. Merriam Company
- Publication place: United States

A Pronouncing Dictionary of American English, also referred to as Kenyon and Knott, was first published by the G. & C. Merriam Company in 1944, and written by John Samuel Kenyon and Thomas A. Knott. It provides a phonemic transcription of General American pronunciations of words, using symbols largely corresponding to those of the IPA. A similar work for English pronunciation is the English Pronouncing Dictionary by Daniel Jones, originally published in 1917 and available in revised editions ever since.

Edward Artin, who succeeded Kenyon as the pronunciation editor of Webster's Dictionary, sought to revise the pronouncing dictionary many years after the publication of Webster's Third (1961), but to no avail, since none of the publishers Artin approached, including the Merriam company, thought it profitable to publish a new edition of the dictionary. After 40 years since its publication, the pronouncing dictionary was still considered the "only major pronouncing dictionary of this century to appear in the United States" according to linguistics historian Arthur J. Bronstein.

== Transcription ==
The dictionary uses a broad transcription rather than a narrow one. For example, the long o vowel of "toe", which is a diphthong in open syllables in most American accents, is represented by the single symbol ⟨o⟩, rather than ⟨oʊ⟩ as it would be represented in a narrow transcription.

One principal application of Kenyon and Knott's system is to teach American English pronunciation to non-native speakers of English. It is commonly used for this purpose in Taiwan, where it is commonly known as "KK Phonetic Transcription" in Chinese.

=== Vowels ===
Vowels are distinguished by quality rather than by length.

/i/ 'be', /ɪ/ 'pity' (both vowels), /e/ 'rate', /ɛ/ 'yet', /æ/ 'sang', /ɑ/ 'ah, far', /a/ 'bath' (for those who distinguish this vowel from both /æ/ and /ɑ/), /ɒ/ 'watch', /ɔ/ 'jaw, gorge', /o/ 'go', /ʊ/ 'full', /u/ 'tooth', stressed /ɝ/ and reduced /ɚ/ 'further' (rhotic accent), /ɜ/ and /ə/ 'further' (non-rhotic accent, also non-rhotic /ɜr/ 'furry', /ər/ 'flattery'), stressed /ʌ/ and reduced /ə/ 'custom, above', /aɪ/ 'while', /aʊ/ 'how', /ɔɪ/ 'toy', /ju/ 'using', /ɪu/ 'fuse' (some accents, otherwise /ju/), /ᵻ/ '-ed' (some accents).

=== Consonants ===
Consonants are routine. Deviations from strict IPA are /r/ 'rate' and /hw/ 'while', as well as the lack of tie bars on /tʃ/, /dʒ/. /j/ has its standard IPA value. /m, n, l/ may be marked as syllabic.

/r/ has minimal effect on a preceding vowel, compared to some dictionary transcriptions. Sequences, some only before another vowel, are /ɪr, er, ɛr, ær, ər, ɑr, ɒr, ɔr, ʊr, aɪr, ɪʊr, jʊr/, and in some accents /ʌr, ɜr/.
