= Darkhan Juzz =

Kazakhstani musician (1990–2023)

- Born: Дархан Балтабекұлы Жүнісбеков; August 9, 1990; Alma-Ata, Kazakh SSR, Soviet Union
- Died: February 24, 2023 (aged 32) Phuket, Thailand

Darhan Baltabekūly Jünısbekov (Note: Kazakh: Дархан Балтабекұлы Жүнісбеков, pronounced [dɑrˈχɑn bɑltɑbeˈkʊlə ʑʏnɪsbeˈkov]; Russian: Дархан Балтабекович Джунусбеков) (9 August 1990 – 24 February 2023), better known as Darkhan Juzz, was a Kazakh indie pop singer, songwriter, sound producer, and musician.

He was included in various music service lists multiple times during his lifetime. Spotify has a history of his songs on the chart. As of 2023, Darkhan Juzz held a strong position in the "Top 100: Kazakhstan" ranking according to Apple Music.

== Biography ==
Darkhan Junisbekov was born on 9 August 1990 in Alma-Ata (now named Almaty). In his youth, he began to show an interest in music, influenced by a friend who played guitar and performed songs by Viktor Tsoi. This musical experience inspired Junisbekov, and mixing this style with his interest in rap, which he began listening to in first grade, allowed him to create his own unique musical style.

At the age of 14, Darkhan began writing music, but was later forced to put this process on hold due to personal circumstances. Between the ages of 18 and 19, he worked in distribution and temporarily moved to Karaganda. It was there that he chose the stage name Darkhan Juzz, although the origins of this name remain unclear.

In 2016, after returning to Almaty (formerly Alma-Ata), Junusbekov began publishing his first tracks, such as "Yen sūlu" and "Kaldyrma meni". His work became prominent in 2017, when his music was used in a short film called "8 Stages of Love", which gained many views on YouTube. Following this, Darkhan Juzz's first music video was released with the title "Kün men aiym" on the channel "Gakku". He also achieved success through collaboration with "Irina Kairatovna Show", where his track "Bәrі musykant" was used in one of the episodes, followed by the release of the music video "Nege nigga?".

Moving forward with his solo career, Darkhan Juzz reached great heights with the track "Sheker" which became a real hit. He also directed the music video for the track, which was filmed using a Samsung smartphone, which he temporarily collaborated with. In 2019, he presented his debut compilation of previously released singles titled "TBRN". Since then, he has established a firm place among significant Kazakhstani performers.

In 2020, Darkhan released several singles, also participated in the album of the duo Sour-Sweet & Bonah in the track "Kadilaktah", and participated in the series of videos õzen, dedicated to the anniversary of Abay. The same year witnessed the use of his music in a TV series called "Sheker".

In 2021, Darkhan Juzz was included in the list of 30 young promising Kazakhstani citizens, which is published annually by Forbes Kazakhstan. This list is formed on the basis of publications in the magazine, recommendations of experts and information from the publication's own sources.

In August 2023, the posthumous album aūe was released, which is Darkhan's second studio album. The album consists of 14 songs. The performer had time to record all the material during his lifetime, and the finalization was done by Darhan's relatives. The album was presented on 11 August 2023 in Almaty at the Tebiren Fest festival dedicated to Darkhan's memory.

== Death ==
Junisbekov died on 24 February, 2023. The accident occurred as a result of a traffic collision on a rented motorcycle in Phuket, Thailand. The news of his sudden passing caused shock and deep sadness among his many fans and all music lovers in Kazakhstan. Darkhan's death became an object of national attention.

Darkhan's band "Tebiren" and hundreds of his fans, after the funeral on 1 March, 2023, gathered in the center of Almaty on Arbat Street, Jibek Joly Street, to see the departed musician off on his last journey. This show of condolence and respect emphasized the important place he held in people's hearts. The place of farewell was not chosen by chance, as Darkhan started his journey there and sang his songs with a guitar.

õzen, the record label of which Darkhan was a member, released the artist's unfinished album, called aūe. The proceeds from the sale of this album were donated to support Junisbekov's children: son Adi and daughter Aidane. This gesture expressed support and care for Darhan's loved ones and allowed his creative legacy to be preserved. Junisbekov was buried in Kensai Cemetery.
