= John Samuel Kenyon =

American linguist

John Samuel Kenyon (July 26, 1874 – September 6, 1959) was an American linguist.

Born in Medina, Ohio, he graduated from Hiram College in 1898 and taught there as a professor of English from 1916 to 1944, when he retired and became an emeritus professor until his death. Together with Thomas A. Knott, he wrote A Pronouncing Dictionary of American English (1944). Kenyon had also earlier published American Pronunciation (1924) and served as the consulting editor of pronunciation to the second edition of Webster's New International Dictionary in his career as a pioneering expert on the study of American English, which earned him the epithet "the dean of American phoneticians".

As Kenyon hailed from Northeast Ohio, he used speech forms there as the basis of the popular text American Pronunciation that became widely disseminated as General American English.

== Works ==
- American Pronunciation (1924/1950), Tenth Edition, Ann Arbor: George Wahr.
- A Pronouncing Dictionary of American English, with Thomas A. Knott (1944/1953) "KK", Springfield, MA: Merriam-Webster.

== Articles ==
- 'Ye and You in the King James Version.' Modern Language Association, PMLA, 1914, Vol. 29, No. 3 (1914), pp. 453–471.
