= Gioro clan =

Manchu clan and family name

Manchu name
- Manchu script: ᡤᡳᠣᡵᠣ
- Möllendorff: gioro

Chinese name
- Traditional Chinese: 覺羅氏
- Simplified Chinese: 觉罗氏
Transcriptions
Standard Mandarin
- Hanyu Pinyin: jué luó shì

Pronunciation respelling name
- Pronunciation respelling: Ghee-ore-oh

Gioro is a prominent Manchu clan and family name comprising numerous branches. According to the General Genealogy of the Eight Banners Manchu Clans (八旗滿洲氏族通譜), “Gioro” was one of the major distinguished Manchu surnames (著姓), including clans as the Irgen Gioro, Šušu Gioro, Sirin Gioro, Tunggiyan Gioro, Ayan Gioro, Hūlun Gioro, Aha Gioro, and Cara Gioro. Their members were dispersed geographically throughout Manchuria during the founding of the Manchu empire.

== Overview ==
The origin of Gioro does not have a decisive conclusion. According to a famous anecdote, the ancestors of Gioro were the emperors Huizong, Qinzong, and other imperial family members of Northern Song Dynasty who were captured by the Jurchens in the Jingkang Incident of the Jin–Song wars. However, in recent years, Jin Qizong, a scholar of Jurchen and Manchu studies identified the previously unattested Jurchen surname Giaoru (交魯氏) in the nineteenth line of the excavated Stele of Successful Jurchen Examinees (宴台女真進士題名碑), a surname absent from the History of Jin. Jin proposed that the Giaoru clan was the antecedent of the Qing-period Gioro clan, arguing that the relationship between the names Giaoru and Gioro was comparable to that between Pucha (蒲察氏) and Fuca (富察氏), or Nalan (納蘭氏) and Nara (那拉氏)—alternative Chinese transcriptions of the same clan name.

According to the Imperially Commissioned Comprehensive Gazetteer of the Great Qing (欽定皇朝通志), the Gioro clans, in a broad sense, can also be categorized as Aisin Gioro (imperial clansmen) and Irgen Gioro (民覺羅氏, tribesmen of non-imperial lineage). Therefore, it was not rare to see in the historical sources which often recorded members of non-Aisin Gioro all as Irgen Gioro members.

Following the fall of the Qing dynasty, many members of the various Gioro branches adopted Zhao (趙) as their Chinese surname.
