= Pronunciation respelling for English =

A pronunciation respelling for English is a notation used to convey the pronunciation of words in the English language, which do not have a phonemic orthography (i.e. the spelling does not reliably indicate pronunciation).

There are two basic types of pronunciation respelling:

- "Phonemic" systems, as commonly found in American dictionaries, consistently use one symbol per English phoneme. These systems are conceptually equivalent to the International Phonetic Alphabet (IPA) commonly used in bilingual dictionaries and scholarly writings but tend to use symbols based on English rather than Romance-language spelling conventions (e.g. ē for IPA /i/) and avoid non-alphabetic symbols (e.g. sh for IPA /ʃ/).
- On the other hand, "non-phonemic" or "newspaper" systems, commonly used in newspapers and other non-technical writings, avoid diacritics and literally "respell" words making use of well-known English words and spelling conventions, even though the resulting system may not have a one-to-one mapping between symbols and sounds.

As an example, one pronunciation of Arkansas, transcribed /ˈɑːrkənsɔː/ in the IPA, could be respelled är′kən-sô′ or AR-kən-saw in a phonemic system, and arken-saw in a non-phonemic system.

== Development and use ==
Pronunciation respelling systems for English have been developed primarily for use in dictionaries. They are used there because it is not possible to predict with certainty the sound of a written English word from its spelling or the spelling of a spoken English word from its sound. So readers looking up an unfamiliar word in a dictionary may find, on seeing the pronunciation respelling, that the word is in fact already known to them orally. By the same token, those who hear an unfamiliar spoken word may see several possible matches in a dictionary and must rely on the pronunciation respellings to find the correct match.

Traditional respelling systems for English use only the 26 ordinary letters of the Latin alphabet with diacritics, and are meant to be easy for native readers to understand. English dictionaries have used various such respelling systems to convey phonemic representations of the spoken word since Samuel Johnson published his Dictionary of the English Language in 1755, the earliest being devised by James Buchanan was featured in his 1757 dictionary Linguæ Britannicæ Vera Pronunciatio, although most words therein were not respelled but given diacritics; since the language described by Buchanan was that of Scotland, William Kenrick responded in 1773 with A New Dictionary of the English Language, wherein the pronunciation of Southern England was covered and numbers rather than diacritics used to represent vowel sounds; Thomas Sheridan devised a simpler scheme, which he employed in his successful 1780 General Dictionary of the English Language, a much larger work consisting of two volumes; in 1791 John Walker produced A Critical Pronouncing Dictionary, which achieved a great reputation and ran into some forty editions. Today, such systems remain in use in American dictionaries for native English speakers, but they have been replaced by the International Phonetic Alphabet (IPA) in linguistics references and many bilingual dictionaries published outside the United States.

The pronunciation which dictionaries refer to is some chosen "normal" one, thereby excluding other regional accents or dialect pronunciation. In England this standard is normally the Received Pronunciation, based upon the educated speech of southern England. The standard for American English is known as General American (GA).

Sophisticated phonetic systems have been developed, such as James Murray's scheme for the original Oxford English Dictionary, and the IPA, which replaced it in later editions and has been adopted by many British and international dictionaries. The IPA system is not a respelling system, because it uses symbols not in the English alphabet, such as ð and θ. Most current British dictionaries use IPA for this purpose.

== Traditional respelling systems ==
The following chart matches the IPA symbols used to represent the sounds of the English language with the phonetic symbols used in several dictionaries, a majority of which transcribe American English.

These works adhere (for the most part) to the one-symbol-per-sound principle. Other works not included here, such as Webster's New Twentieth Century Dictionary of the English Language (unabridged, 2nd ed.), do not adhere and thus have several different symbols for the same sound (partly to allow for different phonemic mergers and splits).

Consonants
IPA	K&K	APA	NOAD	AHD	RHD	WBO	MECD	DPL	DPN	TBD	NBC	MWCD	OED	COD (Note: Older editions of the Concise Oxford Dictionary used a mix of two systems: the "phonetic scheme" shown in the table above and a system "without respelling". The latter added diacritics to conventional spellings.)	POD	Cham	CPD	SD	BLD	AB	Dictcom	BBC	Google	Mac	Wikipedia	Examples
tʃ	tʃ	č	ᴄʜ	ch	c͜h	ch	ch	c̷h	ch	ch	ch	ch	ch, tch	ch	ch	ch	ch	ch	ch	ch	ch	ch, tch	ch	ch	ch, tch	church
ɡ (Note: In IPA, an "opentail G" (ɡ /) was historically preferred to a "looptail G" (g /), although now either variant is acceptable.)	g	g	g	g	g	g	g	g	g	g	g	g	g	g	g	g	g	g	g	g	g	g	g	g	g, gh	game
h	h	h	h	h	h	h	h	h	h	h	h	h	h	h	h	h	h	h	h	hh	h	h	h	h	h	hat
hw (Note: May be analysed differently, see voiceless labial–velar fricative)	hw	hw	(h)w	hw	hw	hw	hw			hw		hw	hw		hw	(h)w		w	hw		hw				wh	which
dʒ	dʒ	ǯ	j	j	j	j	j	j	j	j	j	j	j	j	j	j	j	j	j	jh	j	j	j	j	j	judge
k	k	k	k	k	k	k	k	k	k	k	k	k	k, ck	k	k	k	k	k	k	k	k	k	k	k	k	kick
x	x	x	ᴋʜ	ᴋʜ	ᴋ͜ʜ	kh				ʜ		ḵ	kh	(χ)	k͟h	hh	xh				ᴋʜ	kh			kh	loch (Scottish and Irish); Buch (German)
ŋ	ŋ	ŋ	ɴɢ	ng	n͡g	ng	ng	ŋ	ng	ng	ng	ŋ	ng	ng	ng	ng	ng	ng	ng	ng	ng	ng (ng-g, nk)	ng	ng	ng	thing
s	s	s	s	s	s	s	s	s	s	s	s	s	s, ss	s	s	s	s	s	s	s	s	s	s	s	s, ss	sauce
ʃ	ʃ	š	ꜱʜ	sh	s͜h	sh	sh	s̷h	sh	sh	sh	sh	sh	sh	sh	sh	sh	sh	sh	sh	sh	sh	sh	sh	sh	ship
θ	θ	θ	ᴛʜ	th	t͜h	th	th	t̷h	th	th	th	th	th	th	th	th	th	th	th	th	th	th	th	th	th	thin
ð	ð	ð	ᴛ͟ʜ	𝑡ℎ	ᵺ	th	t͟h	𝑡̷h	ᵺ	T̶H	th꞉	t͟h	dh	dh	t͟h	dh	dh	TH	t͟h	dh	𝑡ℎ	dh	th	dh	dh	this
j	j	y	y	y	y	y	y	y	y	y	y	y	y	y	y	y	y	y	y	y	y	y	y	y	y	yes
ʒ	ʒ	ž	ᴢʜ	zh	z͜h	zh	z͟h	z̷h	zh	zh	zh	zh	zh	zh	z͟h	zh	zh	zh	zh	zh	zh	zh	zh	zh	zh	vision
The following letters have the same values in all systems listed: b, d, f, l, m, n, p, r (Note: The more precise IPA symbol ⟨ɹ⟩ is sometimes used for English /r/.), t, v, w, z.
Vowels
IPA	K&K	APA	NOAD	AHD	RHD	WBO	MECD	DPL	DPN	TBD	NBC	MWCD	OED	COD	POD	Cham	CPD	SD	BLD	AB	Dictcom	BBC	Google AmE, BrE	Mac	Wikipedia	Examples
æ	æ	æ	a	ă	a	a	a	a	a	a	a	a	a	ă	a	a	a	a	a	ae	a	a (arr)	a	a	a (arr)	cat
eɪ	e	e(y)	ā	ā	ā	ay	ay	ā	ay	ā	ay	ā	ay	ā	ay	ā	eh	ay, a_e	ay	ey	ey	ay	ay	ay	ay	day
ɛər	ɛr	εr	e(ə)r	âr	âr	air	air	–	–	âr	air	er	air	ār	air	ār, er (Note: "er" is pronounced /ɛə(r)/ before consonants but /ɛr/ before vowels)	air	air	air	eh r	air	air	ehr, euh	air	air	hair
ɑː	ɑ	a	ä	ä	ä	ah	aa	ä	aw, o	ä	ah	ä, ȧ	ah	ah	aa	ä	ah	ah	ah	aa	ah	aa	aa	ah	ah	father
ɑːr	ɑr	ar	är	är	är	ahr	aar	är	–	är	ahr	är	ar	a͡r	aar	är	ah	ar	ahr	aa r	ahr	ar	aar, aa	ah	ar	arm
ɛ	ɛ	ε	e	ĕ	e	eh	e	e	ɛ	e	e	e	e	ě	e	e	e	e	e	eh	e	e (err)	e/eh	e	e (err)	let
iː	i	i(y)	ē	ē	ē	ee	ee	ē	ē	ē	ee	ē	ee	ē	ee	ē	ee	ee	ee	iy	ee	ee	ee	ee	ee	see
ɪər	ɪr	ιr	i(ə)r	îr	ēr	ihr	eer			ir	ier	ir	eer	ēr	eer	ēr		ihr	eer	iy r	eer	eer	eer, eeuh	ear	eer	here
ɪ	ɪ	ɪ	i	ĭ	i	ih	i	i	i	i	i	i	i	ǐ	i	i	i	i	i	ih	i	i	i	i	i, ih	pit
aɪ	aɪ	ay	ī	ī	ī	y	ī	ī	y	ī	igh	ī	igh	ī	ī	ī	ai	eye, i_e, ye	ɪ	ay	ahy	igh, y	ai/i_e	uy	y, eye (Note: Spelled eye as a syllable of its own; with a consonant, it is spelled y: iodine EYE-ə-dyne; item EYE-təm; pipe PYPE.)	by
ɒ	ɑ	a	ä	ŏ	o	o	o	ä	o	o	ah	ä	o	ǒ	o	o	o	o	o	aa	o	o (orr)	aa, o	o	o (orr)	pot
oʊ	o	o(w)	ō	ō	ō	oh	ō	ō	ō	ō	oh	ō	oh	ō	ō	ō	oh	oh, o_e	oh	ow	oh	oh	ow	oh	oh	no
ɔː	ɔ	ɔ	ô	ô	ô	aw	aw	ô	aw, o	ô	aw	ȯ	aw	aw	aw	ö	aw	aw	aw	ao	aw	aw	aa, aw	aw	aw	caught
ɔːr	ɔr	ɔr	ôr	ôr						ôr	awr	ȯr	or			ör	aw	or	or	ao r	awr	or	or, aw	aw	or	north
ɔːr	or	o(w)r	ôr	ôr						ôr	awr	ȯr	or			ōr, ör (Note: A pronunciation with the north vowel (ör) is always listed for words belonging to the force lexical set, but the distinct force vowel (ōr) is not always given as an alternative for words traditionally included in this group. For example, "ore", "worn", "ford", and "story" can be pronounced either way, but "hoar", "borne", "afford", and "glory" are sounded only with the north vowel; "born" and "borne" are thus invariably homophonous, unlike "or" and "ore", between which a distinction may be drawn. However, in older editions of the dictionary, the presence of the force vowel largely coincided with Wells's corresponding lexical set.)	aw	or	or	ao r	awr, ohr	or	or, aw	aw	or	force
ɔɪ	ɔɪ	ɔy	oi	oi	oi	oy	oy	oi	oy	oi	oi	ȯi	oy	oi	oy	oi	oy	oi	oy	oy	oi	oy	oy	oy	oy	noise
ʊ	ᴜ	ᴜ	o͝o	o͝o	o͝o	u	o͝o	oo	u	u̇	oo	u̇	uu	o͝o	o͝o	ŭ (Note: Older editions of The Chambers Dictionary used o͝o for ŭ and o͞o for oo.)	uu	u	uu	uh	𝑜𝑜	uu	u	oo	uu	took
ʊər	ᴜr	ᴜr	o͝or	o͝or	o͝or	ur	oor			u̇r	oor	u̇r	oor	oor		oor		oor	oor	uh r	𝑜𝑜r	oor	oor, uor	oouh	oor	tour
uː	u	u(w)	o͞o	o͞o	o͞o	oo	oo	o͞o	ū	ü	oo꞉	ü	oo	o͞o	o͞o	oo	oo	oo	oo	uw	oo	oo	oo	ooh	oo	soon
aʊ	aᴜ	aw	ou	ou	ou	ow	ow	ou	ow	ou	ow	au̇	ow	ow	ow	ow	ow	ou	ow	aw	ou	ow	au	ow	ow	out
ʌ	ʌ	ʌ	ə	ŭ	u	uh	u	u	ꭒ	u	uh	ə	u	ǔ	u	u	u	uh	ə	ah	uh	u	uh	u	u	cut
ɜːr	ɜr	ər	ər	ûr	ûr	ur	ur	ʉr	er	ėr	er	ər	ur	e͡r	ər	ûr	ur	ur	ər	er	ur	ur	ur, uh	er	ur	word
ə	ə	ə	ə	ə	ə	uh	ə	ə	e	ə	uh	ə	uh	𝑎, 𝑒, 𝑖, 𝑜, 𝑢	ə	ə	uh	uh	ə	ah	𝑢ℎ	uh	uh	uh	ə	about
ər	ɚ	ər	ər	ər	ər	uhr	ər	ər	er	ər	er	ər	ur	er	ər	ər	uh	ur	ər	er	er	uhr	r, uh	uh	ər	butter
juː	ju	yu	yo͞o	yo͞o	yo͞o	yoo	yoo	yo͞o	yū	yü	yoo꞉	yü	yoo	ū	yo͞o	ū		yoo	yoo	y uw	yoo	yoo	yoo	yooh	ew	view
Stress
IPA	K&K	APA	NOAD	AHD	RHD	WBO	MECD	DPL	DPN	TBD	NBC	MWCD (Note: Older editions of the MWCD and other Webster's dictionaries used the system later followed by the American Heritage Dictionary, with primary stress indicated by a′ and secondary by a′ (sometimes rendered as a" and a').)	OED	COD	POD	Cham	CPD	SD	BLD	AB	Dictcom	BBC	Google	Mac	Wikipedia	Examples
ˈa	ˈa	á	ˈa	a′	a′	á		a′	a′	a′	A	ˈa	A	a·	á	a'	a	a	a	1	a	A	a	(')a	A	primary stress
ˌa	ˌa	à	ˌa	a′	a′	á		a′	a	a′	a	ˌa	a	(a·)	á	a		a	a	2	a	a	a	.a	A	secondary stress
a	ˌa	a	a	a′	a′	a		a′	a	a′	a	ˌa	a	(a·)	a	a		a	a	0	a (Note: For tertiary stress, not only are the letters italicized, but they are in a different font, also. Secondary/tertiary stress is only marked when judged to be unpredictable, but is not distinguished from primary stress when it is marked.)	a	a	a	a	tertiary stress

=== Title abbreviations ===
- IPA – Compromise dialect-neutral English pronunciation using the International Phonetic Alphabet (IPA), as used in Wikipedia.
- K&K – General American pronunciation using symbols largely corresponding to those of the IPA in A Pronouncing Dictionary of American English (also referred to as Kenyon and Knott) (1944 [1953]), John S. Kenyon, Thomas A. Knott. Springfield, Massachusetts: Merriam-Webster.
- APA – Americanist phonetic notation, used primarily in linguistics literature in the U.S.
- NOAD – New Oxford American Dictionary (2001, 2005, 2010). New York: Oxford University Press. (Diacritical transcription).
- AHD – American Heritage Dictionary of the English Language (2000). Boston: Houghton-Mifflin. Also used by the Columbia Encyclopedia.
- RHD – Random House Dictionary of the English Language (1966).
- WBO – World Book Online (1998).
- MECD – Microsoft Encarta College Dictionary.
- DPL – Dictionary of Pronunciation, Abraham Lass and Betty Lass.
- DPN – Dictionary of Pronunciation, Samuel Noory.
- TBD – Thorndike Barnhart Dictionary.
- NBC – NBC Handbook of Pronunciation.
- MWCD – Merriam-Webster's Collegiate Dictionary.
- OED – Oxford English Dictionary.
- COD – The Concise Oxford Dictionary (1964 [1974]), 5th edition, E. McIntosh, ed. Oxford: OUP. (This notation was used up to the 7th edition; newer editions use the IPA.)
- POD – The Pocket Oxford Dictionary (2006), 2nd edition, E. Jewell, Oxford: OUP.
- Cham – The Chambers Dictionary (2003).
- CPD – The Chambers Paperback Dictionary (2012).
- SD – Scholastic Dictionary.
- BLD – Black's Law Dictionary.
- AB – ARPABET, a commonly used computerized encoding of English pronunciation. It is used by the CMU Pronouncing Dictionary.
- Dictcom – Dictionary.com uses a custom phonetic alphabet.
- BBC – BBC Phonetic Respelling.
- Google – Google's pronunciation dictionary.
- Mac - Macquarie Dictionary's "say" respelling system.
- Wikipedia – Wikipedia Pronunciation Respelling Key, used in some Wikipedia articles to spell out the pronunciations of English words.

=== Pronunciation without respelling ===
Some dictionaries indicate hyphenation and syllabic stress in the headword. A few have even used diacritics to show pronunciation "without respelling" in the headwords.

The Concise Oxford Dictionary, 1st through 4th edition, used a mix of two systems. Some editions of Webster's Unabridged Dictionary have offered a method for teachers to indicate pronunciation without respelling as a supplement to the respelling scheme used in the dictionary. Pronunciation without respelling is also sometimes used in texts with many unusual words, such as Bibles, when it is desirable to show the received pronunciation. These will often be more exhaustive than dictionary respelling keys because all possible digraphs or readings need to have a unique spelling.

Concise Oxford Dictionary's system without respelling
COD variant	IPA
ph	/f/
kn (initial)	/n/
wr (initial)	/r/
g, dg	/dʒ/ (before e, i, y) /ɡ/ otherwise (hard and soft g)
c	/s/ (before e, i, y) /k/ otherwise (hard and soft c)
ai, ay	/eɪ/
air	/ɛər/
ae, ea, ee, ie	/iː/
ė, ie (final), ey	/ɪ/
ear, eer, ier	/ɪər/
aw	/ɔː/
oy	/ɔɪ/
ou	/aʊ/
i͡r, u͡r	/ɜr/
eu, ew	/juː/

Henry Adeney Redpath's table of signs in the King James Bible
Symbol	Original gloss	Approximate IPA equivalent*
-	syllable boundary (always added; original hyphens become –)	/./
-́	syllable boundary after stress*	/ˈ/ or /ˌ/ before syll.
ä	ah, arm, father	/ɑː/
ă	abet, hat, dilemma	/æ, ə‡/
ā	tame	/eɪ/
â	fare	/ɛə†/
ạ	call	/ɔː/
ĕ	met, her, second	/ɛ, ɜ†, ə‡/
ē	mete	/iː/
ë	a in tame	/eɪ/
ī	fine	/aɪ/
ĭ	him, fir, plentiful	/ɪ, ɜ†, i‡, ə‡/
î	machine	/iː/
ị	peculiar	/j/
ō	alone	/oʊ/
ŏ	on, protect	/ɒ, ə‡/
ô	nor	/ɔː/
o̱	son	/ʌ, ə‡/
ū	tune	/juː/
û	rude	/uː/
ŭ	us	/ʌ, ə‡/
u̇	turner	/ɜ†/
ȳ	lyre	/aɪ/
y̆	typical, fully	/ɪ, i‡/
a͞a	a of am	/æ/
a͡a	a of fare	/ɛə/
ǣ, a͞e	mediæval	/iː/
a͡i	aisle	/aɪ/
a͟i	hail	/eɪ/
a͞o	o of alone	/oʊ/
a͡u	maul	/ɔː/
e͡e	heed	/iː/
e͡i	i of fine	/aɪ/
e͡u	neuter	/juː/
e͡w	lewd	/juː/
o͡i	oil	/ɔɪ/
c̣	celestial	/s/
c͟h	character	/k/
c͞i	delicious	/ʃ/
ġ	giant	/dʒ/
ṡ	his	/z/
s͞i	adhesion	/ʒ/
T͞h	Thomas	/t/
t͞i	attraction	/ʃ/
* IPA symbols interpreted by Wikipedia. † This reading or symbol is only obtained or used before "r". ‡ This reading is only obtained in unstressed syllables.

== International Phonetic Alphabet ==
The International Phonetic Alphabet is a standardized method of phonetic transcription developed by a group of English and French language teachers in 1888. In the beginning, only specialized pronunciation dictionaries for linguists used it, for example, the English Pronouncing Dictionary edited by Daniel Jones (EPD, 1917). The IPA, used by English teachers as well, started to appear in popular dictionaries for learners of English as a foreign language such as the Oxford Advanced Learner's Dictionary (1948) and Longman Dictionary of Contemporary English (1978).

IPA is very flexible and allows for a wide variety of transcriptions between broad phonemic transcriptions which describe the significant units of meaning in language and phonetic transcriptions which may indicate every nuance of sound in detail.

The IPA transcription conventions used in the first twelve editions of the EPD was relatively simple, using a quantitative system indicating vowel length using a triangular colon, and requiring the reader to infer other vowel qualities. Many phoneticians preferred a qualitative system, which used different symbols to indicate vowel timbre and colour. A. C. Gimson introduced a quantitative-qualitative IPA notation system when he took over editorship of the EPD (13th edition, 1967); and by the 1990s, the Gimson system had become the de facto standard for phonetic notation of British Received Pronunciation (RP).

Short and long vowels in various IPA schemes for RP
word	quant.	qual.	Gimson
rid	rid	rɪd	rɪd
reed	riːd	rid	riːd
cod	kɔd	kɒd	kɒd
cord	kɔːd	kɔd	kɔːd

The first native (not learner's) English dictionary using IPA may have been the Collins English Dictionary (1979), and others followed suit. The Oxford English Dictionary, 2nd edition (OED2, 1989) used IPA, transcribed letter-for-letter from entries in the first edition, which had been noted in a scheme by the original editor, James Murray.

While IPA has not been adopted by popular dictionaries in the United States, there is a demand for learner's dictionaries which provide both British and American English pronunciation. Some dictionaries, such as the Cambridge English Pronouncing Dictionary and the Longman Dictionary of Contemporary English provide a separate transcription for each.

British and American English dialects have a similar set of phonemes, but some are pronounced differently; in technical parlance, they consist of different phones. Although developed for RP, the Gimson system being phonemic, it is not far from much of General American pronunciation as well. A number of recent dictionaries, such as the Collins COBUILD Advanced Learner's English Dictionary, add a few non-phonemic symbols /ʳ i u ᵊl ᵊn/ to represent both RP and General American pronunciation in a single IPA transcription.

Adaptations of the Gimson system for American English
/ɒ/	Pronounced [ɑː] in General American.
/e/	In American English falls between [e] and [æ] (sometimes transcribed /ɛ/)
/əu/	This traditional transcription is probably more accurately replaced by /ou/ in American English.
/r/	Regular r is always pronounced
/ʳ/	Superscript r is only pronounced in rhotic dialects, such as General American, or when followed by a vowel (for example adding a suffix to change dear into dearest)
/i/	Medium i can be pronounced [ɪ] or [iː], depending on the dialect
/ɔː/	Many Americans pronounce /ɔː/ the same as /ɒ/ ([ɑː])
/ᵊl/	Syllabic l, sometimes transcribed /l/ or /əl/
/ᵊn/	Syllabic n, sometimes transcribed /n/ or /ən/

Clive Upton updated the Gimson scheme, changing the symbols used for five vowels. He served as pronunciation consultant for the influential Concise Oxford English Dictionary, which adopted this scheme in its ninth edition (1995). Upton's reform is controversial: it reflects changing pronunciation, but critics say it represents a narrower regional accent, and abandons parallelism with American and Australian English. In addition, the phonetician John C. Wells said that he could not understand why Upton had altered the presentation of price to prʌɪs.

Upton outlined his reasons for the transcription in a chapter of A Handbook of Varieties of English. He said that the PRICE-vowel represented how the starting point could be anything from centralised front to centralised back. The change in the NURSE vowel was intended as a simplification as well as a reflection that nɜːs was not the only possible realisation in RP. The other alterations were intended to reflect changes that have occurred over time.

Upton's reform
word	Gimson	Upton
bet	bet	bɛt
bat	bæt	bat
nurse	nɜːs	nəːs
square	skweə	skwɛː
price	praɪs	prʌɪs

The in-progress 3rd edition of the Oxford English Dictionary uses Upton's scheme for representing British pronunciations. For American pronunciations it uses an IPA-based scheme devised by William Kretzschmar of the University of Georgia.

=== Comparison ===
Comparison of the IPA variants for English
Lexical sets	RP			GA	
Lexical sets	Jones (1909, 1917)	Gimson (1962, 1967)	Upton (1995)	Kenyon&Knott (1944)	Roach et al. (1997)
FLEECE	iː	iː	iː	i	iː
KIT	i	ɪ	ɪ	ɪ	ɪ
DRESS	e	e	ɛ	ɛ	e
TRAP	æ	æ	a	æ	æ
START	ɑː	ɑː	ɑː	ɑr~ɑː (Note: Kenyon & Knott provided alternative variants for Eastern and Southern pronunciation: /ɑː ɒ ɔə ɜ ə ɪə ɛə ᴜə/ for general /ɑr ɑ ɔr ɝ ɚ ɪr ɛr ᴜr/, respectively.)	ɑːr
PALM	ɑː	ɑː	ɑː	ɑ	ɑː
LOT	ɔ	ɒ	ɒ	ɑ~ɒ	ɑː
THOUGHT	ɔː	ɔː	ɔː	ɔ	ɔː
NORTH	ɔː	ɔː	ɔː	ɔr~ɔə	ɔːr
FOOT	u	ʊ	ʊ	ᴜ	ʊ
GOOSE	uː	uː	uː	u	uː
STRUT	ʌ	ʌ	ʌ	ʌ	ʌ
NURSE	əː	ɜː	əː	ɝ~ɜ	ɝː
LETTER	ə	ə	ə	ɚ~ə	ɚ
COMMA	ə	ə	ə	ə	ə
FACE	ei	eɪ	eɪ	e	eɪ
GOAT	ou	əʊ	əʊ	o	oʊ
PRICE	ai	aɪ	ʌɪ	aɪ	aɪ
MOUTH	au~ɑu (Note: In his earlier works, Jones used /ɑu/ for this diphthong.)	aʊ	aʊ	aᴜ	aʊ
CHOICE	ɔi	ɔɪ	ɔɪ	ɔɪ	ɔɪ
NEAR	iə	ɪə	ɪə	ɪr~ɪə	ɪr
SQUARE	ɛə	eə	ɛː	ɛr~ɛə	er
CURE	uə	ʊə	ʊə	ᴜr~ᴜə	ʊr
Notes					

== Dictionaries for English-language learners ==
For many English language learners, particularly learners without easy Internet access, dictionary pronunciation respelling are the only source of pronunciation information for most new words. Which respelling systems are best for such learners has been a matter of debate.

In countries where the local languages are written in non-Latin, phonemic orthographies, various other respelling systems have been used. In India, for example, many English bilingual dictionaries provide pronunciation respellings in the local orthography. This is the case for several Indian languages, including Hindi, Urdu, Malayalam, and Tamil. To reduce the potential distortions of bilingual phonemic transcription, some dictionaries add English letters to the local-script respellings to represent sounds not specified in the local script. For example, in English-Tamil dictionaries, the sounds /b/ and /z/ need to be specified, as in this respelling of busy: "bபிzஸி".

Because these respellings primarily use symbols already known to anyone with minimal literacy in the local language, they are more practical to use in such contexts than the IPA or the Latin respelling systems with diacritics. Another advantage of local-script respellings for English learners is that they retain the "flavour" of local English speech, allowing learners to make connections between their spoken and written English experiences. However, these systems also have limitations. One limitation is that they do not illuminate the English writing system. Like the IPA, they represent phonemes differently from the ways in which the phonemes are normally spelled. So these notations do not guide readers to infer the regularities of English spelling. Also, the practicality of these systems for learning English locally may be offset by difficulties in communication with people used to different norms such as General American or Received Pronunciation.

== Children's dictionaries ==
Most beginner dictionaries are picture dictionaries, or word books. For preliterate native speakers of a language, the pictures in these dictionaries both define the entry words and are the "keys" to their pronunciation. Respellings for English begin to appear in dictionaries for novice readers. Generally, US-based dictionaries contain pronunciation information for all headwords, while UK-based dictionaries provide pronunciation information only for unusual (e.g., ache) or ambiguously spelled (e.g., bow) words.

As the normal age of literacy acquisition varies among languages, so do the age-range designations of children's books. Generally, age ranges for young children's books in English lag behind those of languages with phonemic orthographies by about a year. This corresponds to the slow pace of literacy acquisition among English speakers as compared to speakers of languages with phonemic orthographies, such as Italian. Italian children are expected to learn to read within the first year of elementary school, whereas English-speaking children are expected to read by the end of third grade. Pronunciation respellings begin to appear in dictionaries for children in third grade and up.

There seems to be very little research on which respelling systems are most useful for children, apart from two small studies done in the 1980s and 1990s. Both studies were limited to traditional respelling systems without diacritics (setting aside both the IPA (and IPA-like systems) and the Webster-based systems used in American dictionaries). Both studies found that in such systems, word respellings may be cumbersome and ambiguous, as in this respelling of psychology: "suy-kol-uh-jee".

The authors of the two studies proposed alternative systems, though there were no follow-up studies. Yule's "cut system" leaves out extra letters, adds specific spellings for sounds with variable spellings, and adds accents to show long vowels, as in this respelling of occasion: o-cà-zhon. Fraser advocated a "non-phonemic" approach using a small set of common spelling patterns in which words would be respelled chunk by chunk, rather than phoneme by phoneme, as in this respelling of persiflage (IPA: /ˈpərsɪˌflɑʒ/): per-sif-large. According to both authors, the reduced vowel (schwa) does not need to be shown in a respelling so long as syllabification and syllable stress are shown.

The following overlapping issues concerning pronunciation respelling in children's dictionaries were directly raised by Yule and Fraser: the level of difficulty, the type of notation, the degree of divergence from regular spelling, and pronunciation norms. Yule also raised the question of the types of impact respelling systems could have on children's literacy acquisition. These issues could be usefully addressed in studies that include American respelling systems as well as the IPA.

An issue that has arisen since the Yule and Fraser studies concerns the utility of pronunciation respellings given the availability of audio pronunciations in online dictionaries. Currently, the advantage of written respellings is that they may be read phoneme by phoneme, in parallel to the way novice readers are taught to "stretch out" words to hear all the sounds they contain, while the audio pronunciations are given only as whole words spoken in real time. When audio pronunciations are made flexible, it will become possible to study and compare the utility of different combinations of pronunciation features in the online children's dictionaries.

== Other uses ==
Anglophone press agencies, such as the Voice of America, periodically release lists of respelled given names of internationally relevant people, in order to help news TV and radio announcers and spokespersons to pronounce them as closely as possible to their original languages.

== See also ==
- English spelling reform
- International Phonetic Alphabet
- International Phonetic Alphabet chart for English dialects
- SAMPA
- ARPABET
- English pronunciation of Greek letters
- Help:IPA/English
- Help:Pronunciation respelling key
- Help:IPA/Conventions for English

== Sources ==
- Gaskins, Irene; et al. (1997). "Procedures for Word Learning: Making Discoveries About Words". The Reading Teacher. 50 (4): 312–327.
- Emsley, Bert (February 1940). "Progress in Pronouncing Dictionaries". American Speech. 15 (1): 55–59. doi:10.2307/452729. JSTOR 452729.
- Fraser, Helen (1996). "Guy-dance with Pro-nun-see-ay-shon". English Today. 12 (3): 29–37. doi:10.1017/S0266078400009135. S2CID 143626641.
- Fraser, Helen (1997). "Dictionary Pronunciation Guides for English". International Journal of Lexicography. 10 (3): 181–208. doi:10.1093/ijl/10.3.181.
- Students' Deluxe Dictionary (New ed.). Coimbatore: Deluxe Publishers. n.d.
- Landau, Sidney I. (2001). Dictionaries: The Art and Craft of Lexicography (2nd ed.). Cambridge University Press. ISBN 978-0-521-78040-7.
- Oxford Junior Illustrated Dictionary. Oxford University Press. 2011.
- Seymour, P.H.K.; et al. (2003). "Foundation Literacy Acquisition in European Orthographies". British Journal of Psychology. 94 (2): 143–147. doi:10.1348/000712603321661859. PMID 12803812. S2CID 9716179.
- Wells, John (2001). "IPA transcription systems for English", at University College London Department of Phonetics and Linguistics site. Retrieved 2006-08-16.
- Yule, Valerie (1991). Pilot Experiments in Cutting Surplus Letters (Thesis). Archived from the original on 2011-10-18.
- Windsor Lewis, Jack (December 2003). "IPA vowel symbols for British English in dictionaries". Journal of the International Phonetic Association. 33 (2): 143–152. doi:10.1017/S0025100303001257. S2CID 144393808. Archived from the original on 15 July 2024.
- Upton, Clive (2004). "Received Pronunciation". In Schneider, Edgar W (ed.). A Handbook of Varieties of English. Vol. 1. Phonology. Berlin: Mouton de Gruyter. pp. 217–230. ISBN 978-3-11-017532-5.
- Antimoon.com. "Introduction to phonetic transcription", at Antimoon.com. Retrieved 2006-08-16.
- Oxford English Dictionary. "Pronunciation", from the Preface to the Third Edition. Retrieved 2006-09-10.
- Oxford English Dictionary. "Key for Second Edition Entries", from the OED website. Retrieved 2014-11-21.
- Oxford English Dictionary. "Key to New Edition Entries", from the OED website. Retrieved 2014-11-21.
- Merriam-Webster Online (n.d.). "Pronunciation Overview".
