= Coup of Hongxi =

Coup

A coup of Hongxi (Chinese: 弘晳逆案) was an unsuccessful coup d'etat organised by Hongxi, Prince Li of the First Rank and the eldest surviving son of deposed crown prince Yunreng and other co-conspirators, most of whom were sons of the imperial princes who did not participate in the succession brawl between Yinzhen, Yunzhi, Yunsi and their supporters.

== The background ==
=== Yunreng's tenure as a crown prince ===
Yunreng was instated as the crown prince in 1675, having barely been one year old. Yunreng married lady Guwalgiya (daughter of Shi Wenbing), lady Ligiya, Lady Lingiya, Lady Tanggiya and Lady Fangiya in 1695, with lady Gūwalgiya being instated as crown princess. As Yunreng was instated as a crown prince, his children would be adopted into the imperial palace.

When Kangxi Emperor went on military campaign against Galdan Khan in 1696, Yunreng became a regent. At that time, he showed immoral behaviour, yet remained in the favour. In 1703, Yunreng was implicated in the Songgotu's case of attempt to murder the Kangxi Emperor and stripped of his title.

In 1708, Yunzhi and Yunsi were stripped of their titles. The members of the "Party of the Crown Prince" and Tong Guowei (Kangxi Emperor's maternal uncle) encouraged the emperor to reinstate Yunreng as the crown prince. However, Yunreng was convicted of attempts to seize the throne for himself and deposed in 1712. Yunreng died in 1725 and was posthumously honoured as Prince Limi of the First Rank.

=== The controversy with heir apparent ===
The Qianlong Emperor ascended to the throne in 1735. In 1738, Qianlong Emperor's second son, Yonglian, died of smallpox. Qianlong Emperor decreed that the heir apparent to the throne would be the eldest son born to highest ranking consort. Qianlong Emperor's younger brother, Hongyan, was adopted into Prince Guo peerage. According to the last will of the Kangxi Emperor, the fourth prince Yinzhen would ascend to the throne, while Hongxi would receive a title of the first ranking prince. The group of imperial princes supporting the Party of Crown Prince perverted the meaning of the imperial last will, changing the personal name of the Yongzheng Emperor into the name of deposed crown prince (Kangxi Emperor mentioned that Yinzhen's second surviving son, Hongli, should be instated as a crown prince). In 1739, that same group formed a faction aimed at ousting Qianlong Emperor from power and settling their leader as a new emperor.

== Participants ==
The list of participants included 5 princes of the 'hong' generation (Hongxi, Hongsheng, Hongpu, Hongchang, Hongjiao) and Yunlu. As Yunqi and Yunxiang died before 1739, Yunlu was implicated in the case. Yunli and the family members of the conspirators had nothing in common with the case, except of Hongwei, the younger half-brother of the initiator.

=== Hongxi ===
Hongxi (理親王 弘晳; 25 August 1694 – 26 October 1742) was the eldest surviving son of the deposed crown prince. Although Hongxi was born to secondary crown princess, lady Ligiya, he was seen as a potential candidate to succeed his father. Hongxi was deeply favoured by the Kangxi Emperor since young as he was adopted into the imperial palace and raised as if he was an imperial son.

When Yunreng was deposed for immorality, Kangxi Emperor mentioned that Hongxi has more virtue than his father and wouldn't replicate the latter's misconducts. Choson Korean ambassadors also described him as a virtuous and kind in 1714. According to the last will of the Kangxi Emperor written down by Maci, Hongxi would be granted a title of the Prince of the First Rank, while Yinzhen would ascend to the throne.

Hongxi inherited the Prince Li peerage as the second-ranking prince in 1722. In 1723, Yongzheng Emperor ordered to convert the Villa of the Zheng Family with surrounding barracks into the princely manor. When Hongxi paid his respects together with princess consort, Prince Yu of the First Rank Baotai, Prince Zhuang of the First Rank Yunlu, Prince Heng of the First Rank Yunqi, Minister of the Imperial Household Laibao (of the Hitara clan) and other ministers reported on a personnel of the newly built Prince Li manor. In 1728, Hongxi was promoted to Prince of the First Rank. In 1731, he was present at the funeral of Empress Xiaojingxian. In 1735, when Yongzheng Emperor felt gravely ill in the Old Summer Palace, Hongli was made crown prince and ordered to proclaim the emperor's last will. After the funeral ceremony, at that Hongxi and his paternal uncle Yunyi presided, Hongli ascended to the throne as the Qianlong Emperor.

=== Hongsheng ===
Hongsheng (弘升;1696-1754) was the son of Yunqi, Prince Heng. In 1719, Hongsheng was granted a title of hereditary prince Heng of the First Rank (世子). Hongsheng received an appointment in the imperial stables and supervised the affairs of the Bordered White Banner. In 1727, Hongsheng was stripped of his title because of mistrust. In 1735, Hongsheng was appointed as a commander of Artillery.

=== Hongpu ===
Hongpu (弘普) was the second son of Yunlu, Prince Zhuangke of the First Rank born to secondary princess consort, lady Li. In 1736, Hongpu was granted a title of prince of the fourth rank.

=== Hongjiao ===
Hongjiao (寧良郡王 弘晈; 17 June 1713 – 9 September 1764) was the fourth son of Yinxiang, Prince Yi of the First Rank born to primary princess consort Yixian. In 1730, Hongjiao was granted a title of Prince Ning of the Second Rank. Hongjiao was one of the candidates to inherit the iron-cap Prince Yi of the First Rank peerage. As Hongjiao was given a new princely title, Hongxiao, the seventh son of Yinxiang, inherited the title.

=== Hongchang ===
Hongchang (貝勒 弘昌; 14 December 1706 – 3 June 1771) was the eldest son of Yinxiang, born to secondary princess consort Yixian, lady Gūwalgiya. Hongchang received the title of the prince of the fourth rank in 1723 and was promoted to the prince of the third rank in 1725. As the eldest son, Hongchang could inherit the Prince Yi peerage, but was found unsuitable because of his mental abilities. Hongchang shared a close relationship with Hongsheng, a son of Prince Heng of the First Rank Yunqi.

=== Yunlu ===
Yunlu (允禄; 28 July 1695 – 20 March 1767) was Kangxi Emperor's 16th surviving son by Consort Shunyimi, lady Wang. In 1723, Yunlu was adopted into the Prince Zhuang peerage as Boguoduo died without a male heir. Yunlu was not involved in the succession brawl among the sons of the Kangxi Emperor, like Yuntao, Yunxu, Yunli, Yunqi, Yunyou and other princes who haven't come of age. Due to little difference in age with Hongxi, Yunlu would normally belong to the "hong" generation.

== The plan of the coup ==
In 1739, Hongxi, Hongsheng, Hongchang and Hongjiao met at the Prince Zhuang manor and formed there a faction. Yunlu hesitated to agree with the postulate to oust Qianlong Emperor from power because he wielded an immense authority among the clansmen. However, as Yunlu said, the faction members could have been unable to commit that kind of revolution. Instead of Yunlu, Hongpu joined the fraction. Hongxi was chosen as the most suitable candidate as the son of deposed crown prince by the claim that Kangxi Emperor had high hopes for him.

The rebels planned to accomplish their coup d'etat during the 1739 imperial hunt at the Mulan hunting grounds. Hongxi appeared in the hunt in neapolitan yellow palanquin, which led the rebels to believe that he is the emperor. The rebels said that Dzungar Khanate could not have dared to defeat Beijing and attempted to proclaim him as an emperor.

Hongchang ordered Hongxi to return to the capital so as to prepare for the coronation. Hongpu dispatched a messenger to report an urgent matter to the emperor, but was arrested at the Copper Wall by imperial guards. During the arrest, only Hongchang pleaded his innocence. The plan of the faction failed at that moment.

== Trial and the punishments ==
The rebelliants were temporarily enclosed in the Imperial Clan Court, where the trial was held. One of the persons interrogating rebelliants was Ba'ertu, Prince Kang of the First Rank, (Note: Prince Li (礼) of the First Rank was renamed as Prince Kang (康) of the First Rank) who had been entrusted with the affairs of the imperial clan court. Another interrogator was Fupeng, Prince Ping of the Second Rank. (Note: Prince Keqin of the Second Rank peerage (克勤郡王) was named as Prince Ping of the Second Rank (平郡王)) The proper decree was drafted by Ba'ertu and Zhang Tingyu, one of the most prominent officials of the Qianlong era.

=== Punishments of Hongxi ===
- Deprivation of the title of Prince of the First Rank
- Banishment from the imperial clan
- Renaming as "Sishiliu" (四十六 (Note: Meaning "46" in Chinese. Hongxi was 46 years old during the rebellion he organised.))
- Imprisonment at the Eastern Garden near Jingshan park
- Removal from the imperial genealogy

The punishments received by Hongxi were comparable to the punishments received by Yunsi or Yuntang. Hongxi's daughters and consorts were spared from punishments.

=== Punishments of Hongsheng ===
Hongsheng was co-organiser of the rebellion. As he was once stripped of his title, he received following punishment:

- Perpetual imprisonment

=== Punishment of Hongchang ===
- Deprivation of the title of Prince of the Third Rank

=== Punishment of Hongpu ===
- Demotion to the grace defender duke

=== Punishment of Hongjiao ===
Hongjiao did not play major role in the clique.

- Deprivation of salary

=== Punishment of Yunlu ===
Yunlu disagreed with postulates of rebels. Nevertheless, his son was included in the list of factionists.

- Dismission from the official position.

== The fate of the rebels ==
Hongxi died in captivity in 1742, having been 49 years old. Hongxi's title was passed to Hongwei, who was posthumously honoured as Prince Like of the Second Rank.

Hongchang never recovered his beile title and died on 3 June 1771.

Hongjiao held several appointments until 1759, when he was stripped of his position in the Ministry of Revenue due to several delicts. His relatives were not implicated in the case. Hongjiao dedicated most of his time to poetry.

Hongsheng died in 1754 and was posthumously honoured as Prince Gongke of the Third Rank (恭恪贝勒, meaning "reverent and respectful").

Hongpu was designated as a right vice director of the Imperial Clan Court in 1740. Hongpu died in 1743 and was posthumously honoured as Hereditary Prince Gongqin (恭勤世子, "gongqin" meaning "respectful and diligent").

Yunlu supervised a court of imperial music and completely lost trust of the Qianlong Emperor. In 1759-1766, Yunlu compiled the "Illustrated Precedents for the Ritual Paraphernalia of the imperial Court", a holistic publication concerning items necessary for the ceremonies of the imperial court in 18 volumes. Yunlu died in 1768 and his title was passed to Yongchang, Hongpu's son.

== Revival ==
In 1778, Qianlong Emperor restored the original names of Yunsi, Yuntang and Hongxi and allowed their descendants to be recorded in the imperial genealogy. However, the emperor did not revoke the decrees depriving those princes of their titles. In 1783, when the imperial chronicles were commissioned, the historians were ordered to emphasise the role of the emperor in quelling the rebellion and to mention that "Hongxi and others wanted to usurp the throne".
