= Hongchang (prince) =

- Prince of the Third Rank
- Born: 14 December 1706
- Died: 3 June 1771 (aged 64)
- Spouse: Lady Nara; Lady Borjigit
- Issue: Yongxuan, Yongkun, Yongchong, Yongliang
- Father: Yinxiang
- Mother: Lady Guwalgiya

Aisin Gioro Hongchang (貝勒 弘昌; 14 December 1706 – 3 June 1771) was the eldest son of Yinxiang.

== Life ==
Hongchang was born on 14 December 1706 to secondary princess consort Yixian, lady Gūwalgiya.

Hongchang received the title of the prince of the fourth rank in 1723 and was promoted to the prince of the third rank in 1725. As the eldest son, Hongchang could inherit the Prince Yi peerage, but was found unsuitable because of his mental abilities.

秉性愚蠢，向来不知率教，伊父怡亲王奏请圈禁在家 Daft by temperament, not following the Teaching. His father Prince Yi of the First Rank requested for home arrest.

Hongchang shared a close relationship with Hongsheng, a son of Prince Heng of the First Rank Yunqi.

In 1739, Hongchang was embroiled in the unsuccessful Coup likewise his 5 cousins and paternal uncle. Hongchang met with Hongxi, Hongjiao, Hongpu and Hongsheng at the Prince Zhuang manor so as to discuss the detronisation of the Qianlong Emperor in favour of Hongxi.

The rebelliants planned to accomplish their coup d'état during the imperial hunt at the Mulan hunting grounds. Hongxi appeared in the hunt in neapolitan yellow palanquin, which led the rebels to believe that he is the emperor. The rebels, including Hongchang, said that Dzungar Khanate could not have dared to defeat Beijing and attempted to proclaim him as an emperor. Hongchang ordered Hongxi to return to the capital so as to prepare for the coronation. When the plan of fractionists was exposed by Hongpu, only Hongchang pleaded his innocence as he played major role in the clique.

The case of rebels was tried by the Imperial Clan Court with Bartu, Prince Kangjian presiding. Hongchang was deprived of his title of third-ranking prince and did not recover it and died on 3 June 1771. His descendants were minor clansmen (闲散宗室)

== Family ==
=== Consorts and issue ===
- Primary consort, of the Nara clan (嫡夫人那拉氏)
  - Yongxuan (永喧; 1724–1760)
- Second primary consort, of the Borjigin clan (继夫人博尔济吉特氏)
  - Second son
  - Yongkun (永崑; 1730–1767), third son
- Mistress, of the Song clan (妾宋氏)
- Mistress, of the Sun clan (妾孙氏)
  - Yongchong (永崇; 1757–1790), fourth son
  - Yongliang (永良; 1760–1803), fifth son
- Mistress, of the Li clan (妾李氏)

=== Family tree ===
Shunzhi Emperor
Kangxi Emperor
Empress Xiaokangzhang
Yinxiang
Šose (硕色)
Imperial Noble Consort Jingmin
Hongchang
Ahajan (阿哈占)
Lady Guwalgiya
