= Consort Yi (Kangxi) =

Chinese imperial consort (1660–1733)

Consort Yi 宜妃
- Born: 1660
- Died: 2 October 1733 (age 73); Prince Heng's Mansion, Imperial City, Beijing
- Burial: Jing Mausoleum, Eastern Qing tombs
- Spouse: Kangxi Emperor
- Issue: Yunki, Prince Hengwen of the First Rank; Yuntang; Yinzi
- House: Gorolo (郭络罗氏; by birth); Aisin-Gioro (by marriage)
- Father: Sanguanbao (三官保)

Consort Yi (Chinese: 宜妃; 1660 – 2 October 1733) of the Manchu Bordered Yellow Banner Gorolo clan, was a concubine of the Kangxi Emperor. She was 6 years his junior.

== Life ==
=== Family background ===
Consort Yi's personal name was Nalanzhu (Chinese: 納蘭珠, pinyin: Nà lán zhū) .She was a Booi Aha of the Plain Yellow Banner by birth.Her family was later a part of Bordered Yellow Banner.

- Father: Sanguanbao (三官保), served as third rank literary official (侍郎)
  - Paternal grandfather: Antamu (安塔穆)
- Nine brothers
  - Daobao (道保), served as second rank military official (副都统)
  - Duopuku (多普库), served as fourth rank military official (左领)
  - Tepuku (特普库), served as fourth rank military official (左领)
  - Epuku (鄂普库), served as fifth rank literary official (郎中)
  - Tapuku (他普库)
  - Jinengte (及能特)
- Sister:
  - Buyinzhu (Chinese: 布音珠, pinyin: Bù yīn zhū), Noble Lady (貴人) of the Gorolo clan (郭絡羅氏), Kangxi's concubine and the mother of Princess Kejing and Yinju.

=== Kangxi era ===
Lady Gorolo entered the Forbidden City in 1677 and became a lady-in-waiting.In August of the same year, Lady Gorolo was favoured by Kangxi and became a part of his harem with rank of Concubine Yi. On 5 January 1680, Concubine Yi gave birth to the emperor's 5th son Yinqi. In December 1681, Noble Consort Tong was elevated to Imperial Noble Consort (Chinese: 皇貴妃; Pinyin: huángguìfēi), furthermore Concubine Rong, Concubine Yi, Concubine Hui and Concubine De were elevated to the rank of Consort. On 17 October 1683, Consort Yi gave birth to the emperor's 9th son Yuntang.On 8 June 1685, Consort Yi gave birth to 11th prince Yinzi, her last child, who would die prematurely on 22 August 1696.

On 20 August 1699, Concubine Min died and Consort Yi took care of Princess Wenke of the Second Rank. She also raised Princess Kejing, her sister's daughter and Kangxi's 6th daughter.

=== Yongzheng era ===
The Kangxi Emperor published an edict during his lifetime that after his death, the princes could bring their elderly mothers to live in their homes, but they still had to go to the palace every month to greet Emperor Yongzheng in person and meet the empress. Therefore, Consort Yi moved to her son, Prince Heng, Yinqi's mansion in June of the first year of Yongzheng.

On October 2nd in the eleventh year of Yongzheng (1733), Consort Yi died in Prince Heng's Mansion. Later, in 1736 she was buried in the Jing Mausoleum, Eastern Qing tombs.

== Title ==
- During the reign of the Shunzhi Emperor (r. 1643–1661)
  - Lady Gorolo (郭絡羅氏; from 1660)
- During the reign of the Kangxi Emperor (r. 1661–1722)
  - Court Lady (宮女; from 1677)
  - Concubine Yi (宜嬪; from August 1677)
  - Consort Yi (宜妃; from December 1681)

== Issue ==
As Concubine Yi:

- Yunqi, Prince Hengwen of the First Rank (恆溫親王 允祺; 5 January 1680 – 10 July 1732), The emperor's 5th son

As Consort Yi:

- Yuntang, Prince of the Fourth Rank (貝子 允禟; 17 October 1683 – 22 September 1726), the emperor's 9th son
- Yinzi (胤禌; 8 June 1685 – 22 August 1696), The emperor's 11th son

== See also ==
- Royal and noble ranks of the Qing dynasty
- Imperial Chinese harem system
