= Yinlu =

Yinlu may refer to:

- Yunlu (1695–1767), formally Prince Zhuang, imperial prince of the Qing dynasty, known as Yinlu before 1722
- Yinlu Foods, a Chinese food and drink company

== See also ==
- Yin Lu (born 1989), Chinese footballer
