= Hongxi (prince) =

Hongxi 弘晳
- Prince Li of the First Rank 和碩理親王

Head of the House of Prince Li peerage
- Tenure: 1723–1739
- Predecessor: peerage created Yunreng (awarded posthumously)
- Successor: Hongwei
- Born: Hongxi (弘晳); 25 August 1694 康熙三十三年甲戌七月初五日辰時; Forbidden City, Beijing
- Died: 26 October 1742 (aged 48) 乾隆七年九月二十八日卯時; Beijing
- Consorts: Lady Ulanghan
- Issue: See § Family
Names
- Hongxi (弘晳)
- House: Aisin Gioro
- Father: Crown Prince Yunreng
- Mother: Secondary Consort, of the Ligiya clan

Hongxi (Chinese: 弘晳; 25 August 1694 – 26 October 1742) was a Qing imperial prince. He was the second son of Crown Prince Yunreng, and through him the grandson of the Kangxi Emperor. His mother was Lady Ligiya, Yunreng's secondary consort.

Hongxi is most well known for leading five other princes in a failed coup in 1739. The plotters wanted to remove the Qianlong Emperor and enthrone Hongxi instead.

== Life ==
Hongxi was born on July 25, 1694. Hongxi was cultivated by his grandfather the Kangxi Emperor since childhood. He was adopted by Imperial Princess Consort Limi, of the Gūwalgiya clan.

In 1714, King Sukjong of Joseon sent envoys to the Qing court. They reported that: "Hongxi is quite virtuous, it is difficult to abolish Yunreng."

Hongxi was a favorite of Kangxi's. In 1722, a palace rumour claimed that the Kangxi Emperor would grant a special title of Prince to Hongxi.

After his uncle, Yinzhen, became the Yongzheng Emperor, Hongxi was awarded with the title of Prince Li. The relationship between Yongzheng and Hongxi was harmonious. He held the title Prince Li of the Second Rank from 1723 to 1728, and was promoted to Prince Li of the First Rank in 1728.

Hongxi organised an unsuccessful coup d'etat against Qianlong in 1739, Along with Hongxi the conspirators included five other princes: Hongsheng, Hongpu, Hongchang, Hongjiao and Yunlu. He was stripped of his title, banished from the Aisin Gioro clan, and imprisoned at the Eastern Garden near Jingshan park. Later, he was forced to change his name to Syšilio (Manchu: ᠰᡟᡧᡳᠯᡳᠣ). "Syšilio" is a Manchu transliterating words of a Chinese word Sìshíliù (Chinese: 四十六), which can be translated as "forty-six" in English. Hongxi was forty-six years old during the rebellion he organised, Qianlong used this method to humiliate him.

In 1778, Hongxi was restored to the Aisin Gioro clan and had his name changed back from "Syšilio" to "Hongxi".

== Family ==
Parents:

- Father: Yunreng, Prince Limi of the First Rank.
- Biological Mother: Secondary Consort, of the Ligiya clan (側福晉 李佳氏)
  - Adoptive Mother: Imperial Princess Consort Limi, of the Gūwalgiya clan (和碩亲王福晋 瓜爾佳氏; d. July/August 1718)

Consorts and issues:

- Primary Consort of the Kharchin Ulanghan clan (科爾沁部烏朗罕濟爾默氏)
  - Yongchen (永琛; 1712–1766), Second-class imperial guard (二等侍衛), first son
  - Yonglin (永琳; 1714–1739), second son
- Concubine, of the Zhao clan (兆氏)
  - Yongmei (永玫; 1714–1788), third son
  - Yongshao (永玿; 1720–1762), eight son
  - Yonghuai (永淮; 1728–1793), Third rank military official (護軍參領), fourteenth son
  - Fourth daughter
- Concubine, of the Qiang clan (強氏)
  - Yongxun (永珣; 1714–1756), Third-class imperial guard (三等侍衛), fourth son
  - Sixth son (1718–1719)
  - Yongju (永琚; 1720–1765), ninth son
  - Yongtian (永琠; 1721–1772), tenth son
  - Yongji (永積; 1734–1754), seventeenth son
  - Lady of the Second Rank (县君), first daughter
    - Married Tsewangjab of the Gorlosi (郭尔罗斯氏) clan in 1728
  - Lady of the First Rank (郡君), twelfth daughter
- Concubine, of the Zhang clan (章氏)
  - Second daughter
    - Married Dondob of the Naiman Borjigin clan
  - Third daughter
  - Sixteenth Daughter
- Concubine, of the Yuan clan (袁氏)
  - Sixteenth son (1730–1732)
- Concubine, of the Zhang clan (張氏)
  - Yongjin (永瑾; 1717–1777), fifth son
  - Yongting (永珽; 1719–1751, seventh son
  - Eleventh son (1723–1723)
  - Yongguan ( 永瓘; 1724–1800), twelfth son
  - Yongpei (永珮; 1726–1763), thirteenth so
  - Fifteenth son (1730–1732)
  - Eighteenth son (1739–1754)
- Concubine, of the Wang (王氏)

== See also ==
- Prince Li
- Royal and noble ranks of the Qing dynasty
- Imperial Chinese harem system#Qing
- Coup of Hongxi
