= Hongsheng =

Heir apparent to the Prince Heng peerage
- Tenure: 1720–1726
- Born: 6 April 1696
- Died: 22 April 1754 (aged 58)
- Spouse: Lady Daigiya; Lady Tatara
- Issue: Yongrui; Yongze, Prince of the Fourth Rank
Posthumous name
- Prince Gongke of the Third Rank (恭恪貝勒)
- Father: Yunki, Prince Hengwen of the First Rank
- Mother: Lady Liugiya

Hongsheng (弘昇; 6 April 1696 – 22 April 1754) was Qing dynasty imperial prince as the first son of Yunki, Prince Hengwen of the First Rank. He was one of the participants in the 1739 Coup of Hongxi that tried and failed to unseat the Qianlong Emperor.

== Life ==
Hongsheng was born on 6 April 1696 to lady Liugiya, Secondary Princess Consort Hengwen of the First Rank.

In 1719, Hongsheng was designated an hereditary prince Heng of the First Rank (世子). Starting in 1721, Hongsheng was made a guardian of the Xiaoling and Zhao Mausoleums, together with Princes Hongzhi, Yunlu and Yunli. Hongsheng received an appointment in the imperial stables and supervised the affairs of the Bordered White Banner. In 1727, Hongsheng was stripped of his title because of negligence in meddling the official affairs and mistrust. Hongsheng's father was instructed to impose a strict treatment on him and dedicate time for his study. In 1735, Hongsheng was appointed as a commander of the artillery.

In 1739, Hongsheng and 6 other princes became involved in an unsuccessful coup d'état led by Hongxi, the eldest son of the deposed crown prince Yinreng. The princes met at the Prince Zhuang Manor to discuss the plan to overthrow the Qianlong Emperor and transfer the throne to Hongxi. During the Mulan hunt, Hongsheng was the first prince to declare Hongxi an emperor. After the coup plot was exposed by Hongpu, Hongsheng did not plead his innocence. He was imprisoned for life and stripped of his title.

Hongsheng died in 1754 and was posthumously honoured as Prince Gongke of the Third Rank (恭恪贝勒, meaning "reverent and respectful").

== Family ==
=== Consorts and issue ===
- Primary consort of the Daigiya clan (嫡夫人戴佳氏)
  世子嫡福晋→贝勒嫡夫人
- Second primary consort, of the Tatara clan (继夫人他他拉氏)
  贝勒继夫人
- Mistress, of the Ilari clan (妾伊拉里氏)
  - Second son
- Mistress, of the Joogiya clan (妾兆佳氏)
  - Yongrui (永瑞; 1716–1789), first son
- Mistress, of the Yang clan (妾杨氏)
  - Prince of the Fourth Rank Yongze (贝子永泽;1741-1810)

=== Family tree ===
Shunzhi Emperor
Kangxi Emperor (1654–1722)
Empress Xiaokangzhang
Yunki
Sanguanbao
Consort Yi
Hongsheng
Liu Wenhuan (刘文焕)
Lady Liugiya
