= Zaixun =

Zaixun may refer to:

- Zaixun, Prince Zhuang (載勛) (1853–1901), a Manchu prince of the Qing dynasty
- Zaixun, Prince Rui (載洵) (1893–1948), a Manchu prince of the Qing dynasty
