= Yongchang (prince) =

- Prince Zhuang of the First Rank

Prince Zhuang of the First Rank
- Tenure: 20 March 1767 – 27 February 1788
- Predecessor: Yunlu
- Successor: Mianke
- Born: Yongcong (永琮); 18 April 1737
- Died: 27 February 1788 (aged 50)
- Spouse: Lady Wanyan
Names
- Yongchang (永瑺)
Posthumous name
- Prince Zhuangshen of the First Rank (莊慎親王)
- House: Aisin Gioro
- Father: Hongpu
- Mother: Lady Guo

Yongchang (Chinese: 永瑺, 18 April 1737 – 27 February 1788) was a Qing dynasty imperial prince as the eldest son of Hongpu and Yunlu's grandson. After Yunlu was adopted into Prince Zhuang peerage, his successors followed suit. Thus, Yongchang became the fifth in the line of the Prince Zhuang of the First Rank.

== Life ==
Yongchang was born on 18 April 1737 to Hongpu's secondary consort, lady Guo, as Yongcong. In 1746, when Qianlong Emperor's seventh son, Yongcong was born, second character in his name was changed to 'chang' so as to avoid naming taboo, which prohibited a replication of a character in the personal name of imperial prince being direct descendant of an emperor. In 1743, Yongchang inherited his father as a duke of the second rank (辅国公). In 1768, he became the fourth Prince Zhuang of the First Rank after the death of his grandfather. At that time, promotional ceremony was organised after the sacrificial rites at the Temple of Agriculture. List of the princes promoted at the same time included Hongzhou, Prince He of the First Rank; Hongxiao, Prince Yi of the First Rank and Guanglu; Prince Yu of the First Rank.

Yongchang inherited a title of the prince of the first rank because of an incident concerning his father's implication in a rebellion organized by Hongxi, second Prince Li in 1739. After the promotion, Yongchang was appointed as a director of the Imperial Clan Court and was tasked with supervision of the Gioro family school (reserved exclusively for collateral clansmen). During his cadention in the Imperial Clan Court, he analysed the history of worships and created a genealogy of the Northern Song dynasty. During an eastern tour to the tomb of Nurhaci and Yangguli (one of the Qing founders), Yongchang and Yongcan were ordered to make sacrifices. Due to delay in performance of the rites at Nurhaci's mausoleum, Yongchang was suspended of his salary for five years.

Yongchang was known for his close relationship with another imperial princes, such as Prince Xin of the Second Rank, Rusong. As the princes were born on the same year, their relationship was close to brotherhood. Yongchang died on 27 February 1788 without a male heir and was posthumously granted a title of Prince Zhuangshen of the First Rank ("庄慎亲王, meaning "dignified and prudent").

== Family ==
Yongchang was married to lady Wanyan, daughter of the censor Kangyilu (亢伊禄). As he could not have a male heir, he adopted his grandnephew Mianke, a grandson of Hongrong as a successor.

Consorts:

- Primary consort, of the Wanyan clan (嫡福晋 完颜氏)

Issue:

- Adopted son: Mianke, Prince Zhuangxiang of the First Rank
