= Šose =

First bearer of the Prince Chengze title

- Prince Chengze of the First Rank 和碩承澤親王

Prince Zhuang of the First Rank
- Tenure: 23 November 1644 – 12 January 1655
- Predecessor: peerage created
- Successor: Boggodo
- Born: 17 January 1629; Qingning Palace, Mukden
- Died: 12 January 1655 (aged 25)
- Spouse: Lady Nara; Lady Borjigit
- Issue: Boggodo; Bo'erguoluo; Enggebu; Princess Heshun of the Second Rank
Names
- Šose
Posthumous name
- Prince Chengzeyu of the First Rank (承澤裕親王)
- Father: Hong Taiji
- Mother: Secondary consort, lady Yehe Nara

Šose (Manchu: ᡧᠣᠰᡝ; Chinese: 碩塞; 17 January 1629 - 12 January 1655) was Hong Taiji's fifth son and the first bearer of the Prince Chengze title. In 1655, the peerage was renamed to Prince Zhuang of the First Rank. In 1778, the Prince Chengze of the First Rank peerage was granted iron-cap status, which meant that each successive bearer could pass the title without degradation.

== Life ==
=== Family background ===
Šose was born on 17 January 1629 in the Qingning palace of the Forbidden City in Mukden, residence of Qing dynasty emperor at that time. His mother, lady Yehe-Nara was a secondary consort of Hong Taiji. Lady Yehe Nara's father, Anabu (阿纳布) was a cousin of Yangginu, the father of Empress Xiaocigao, Monggo Jerjer. Before entry to the imperial household, lady Yehe Nara had been married to Karkama, a leader of Ula valley. After giving birth to Šose, lady Yehe Nara married minister Zhan Tuxietu. Lady Yehe Nara became a victim of domestic violence shortly after the marriage. The fairly abusive behavior of Zhan Tuxietu led her to the fourth marriage with Darhu (达尔琥), a member of the Hada Nara clan of the Bordered Yellow Banner. Shuose was raised in the Qingning palace together with Bomubogor and Fulin, the future Shunzhi Emperor.

=== Political career ===
Although Šose was born to the high-ranking consort, he had no chances to succeed the throne. In June 1644, Šose married lady Nara, daughter of Feiyanggu and was subsequently granted the title of Prince Chengze of the Second Rank. During the transition from Ming to Qing, Šose followed Dodo, Prince Yu in Shaanzhou. In 1645, he conquered Henan together with Dodo. He captured Li Zicheng's generals Zhang Youseng and Liu Fangliang, who were later recovered by the peasant rebels. In the Battle of Shanhai Pass, Šose killed Ma Shiyao (马世尧). He later took part in Qing operations at Datong together with Ajige.

After the death of Dorgon, Šose was promoted to Prince Chengze of the First Rank in 1651 and served as one of the regents together with Wakeda, Daišan's son and Prince Qian of the Second Rank. Šose died on 12 January 1655 and was posthumously honoured as Prince Chengzeyu of the First Rank (承澤裕親王, meaning "blessed and abundant"). His successor was his eldest son Boguoduo.

== Estate ==
The estate of Prince Zhuang of the First Rank totaled 78.000 mu scattered over 25 counties in Zhili, 4.000 mu in Zhangjiakou and Chengde, 71.000 mu in Liaoning and pasturelands totaling 324.000 mu in Shanxi, which constituted 5.5% of taxable arable land for the empire in 1887. Before the demise of the Qing dynasty, the estate had totaled 550.000 mu despite 8 times of division.

== Family ==
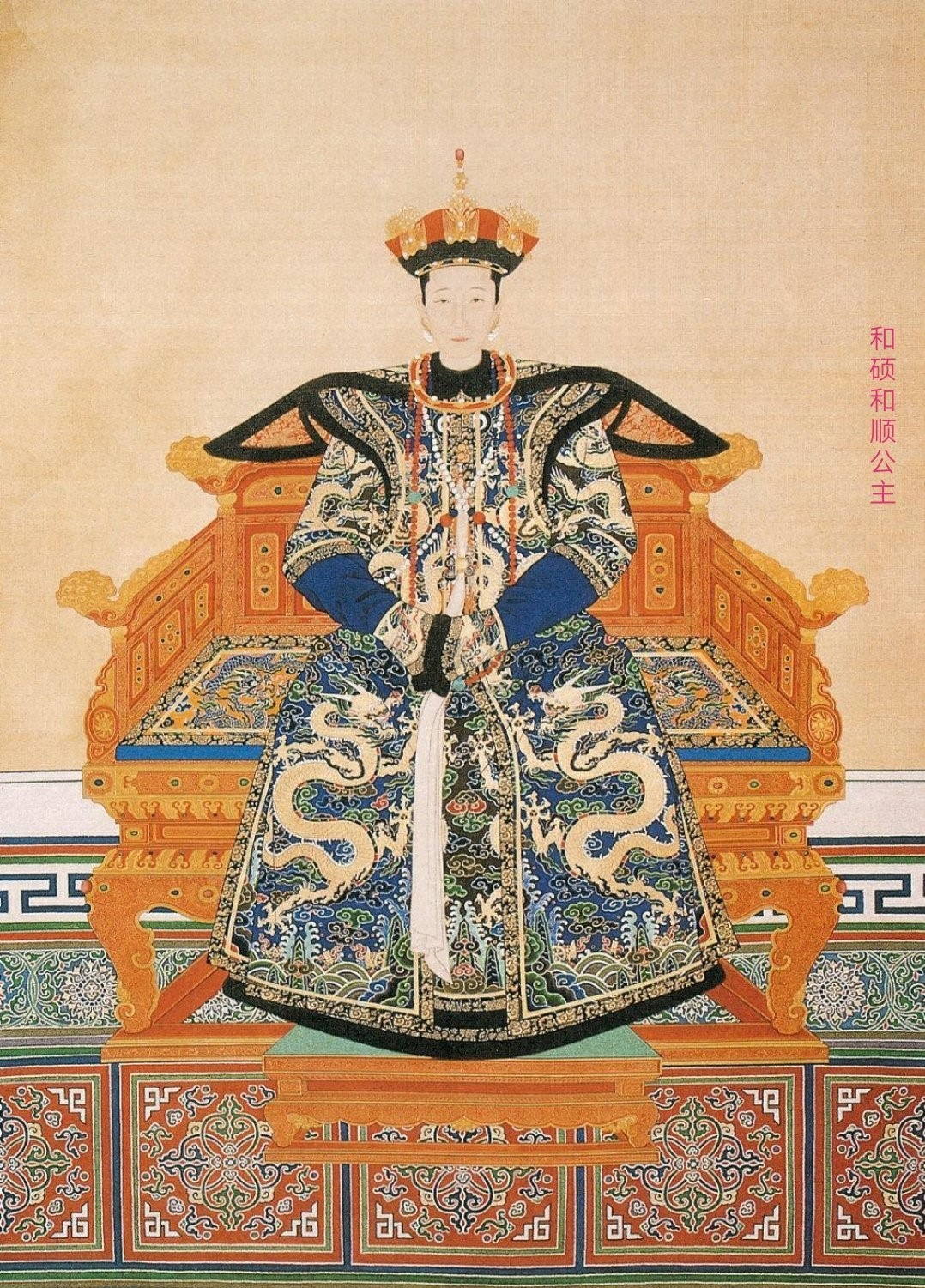
Princess Heshun of the Second Rank, Kangxi Emperor's cousin adopted to the imperial palace

Primary Consort

- First primary consort, of the Nara clan
  皇五子嫡福晋→承泽郡王嫡福晋→承泽亲王嫡福晋→承泽裕亲王嫡福晋
  - Princess Heshun of the Second Rank (和碩和順公主; 8 October 1648 – January 1692), second daughter
    - Married Shang Kexi's son Shang Zhilong in 1660
  - Boguoduo, Prince Zhuangjing of the First Rank (22 April 1650 – 15 February 1723), first son
  - Bo'erguoluo, Prince Hui of the Second Rank (博尔果洛; 13 December 1651 – 26 March 1712), second son
- Second primary consort, of the Khorchin Borjigin clan, daughter of Manzhuxili

Secondary Consort

- Secondary consort, of the Khorchin Borjigin clan (d. May/June 1655), daughter of Dalai (达赉)

Concubine

- Mistress, of an unknown clan
  - Enggebu, General Wenxi of the Second Rank (三等温僖辅国将军 鞥额布; 21 July 1652 – 3 April 1681), third son
- Mistress, of the Erdosu clan (鄂爾鐸蘇氏)
  - Suiha (随哈; 11 December 1654 – 23 April 1657), fourth son
