= Wuyunzhu =

Imperial consort of the Qing dynasty

Wuyunzhu (simplified Chinese: 乌云珠; traditional Chinese: 烏雲珠; pinyin: Wūyúnzhū), was a secondary consort of Hong Taiji, the founding emperor of the Qing dynasty. She belonged to the prominent Yehe-Nara clan, one of the major Jurchen tribes during the late Ming period.

== Biography ==
=== Family background ===
Wuyunzhu's father, Anabu (阿纳布), was reputed to be a relative of Gintaisi, a leader of the Yehe confederation.

Lady Yehe-Nara's grandfather, Yalinbu (雅林布), was cousin of Yangginu, the father of Empress Xiaocigao. According to Qing dynasty archival documents, Yalinbu and Yangginu's grandfather was Chukungge (褚孔革).

- Father: Anabu (阿纳布), chieftain (beile) of Yehe (贝勒)
  - Paternal grandfather: Yalinbu (雅林布)
    - Great-great-grandafather: Chukungge (褚孔革)
- Eldest uncle: Narimbulu
- Second uncle: Gintaisi

=== Early life ===
Neither the date of Lady Yehe-Nara's birth nor that of her death are known.

Before entering the imperial palace, she had been married to Karkama, a leader of Ula.

=== Life in the imperial palace ===
Lady Yehe-Nara was taken by Hong Taiji in 1619 shortly after the execution of her first husband as a result of the annexation of Yehe, a common practice among the Manchus.

On 17 January 1628, she gave birth to the fifth imperial son, Šose, who was raised in Qingning Palace with Bomubogor and Fulin, the future Shunzhi Emperor.

=== Life after leaving the imperial palace ===
After giving birth to Šose Lady Yehe-Nara left the palace and married Zhan Tuxietu. She became a victim of domestic violence shortly after the marriage, which led to her fourth marriage to Darhu (达尔琥), a member of the Hada-Nara clan of the Bordered Yellow Banner.
