= Hongpu =

- beizi

Heir presumptive to Prince Zhuang
- Tenure: 1713–1743
- Born: 9 August 1713
- Died: 16 April 1743 (aged 29)
- Spouse: Lady Hurha
- Issue: Yongchang; Yongke; Yongjian
Names
- Hongpu (弘普)
Posthumous name
- Prince Gongqin of the Fourth Rank (恭勤貝子); Prince Zhuang Gongqin of the First Rank (莊恭勤親王) (awarded posthumously in 1767)
- House: Aisin Gioro
- Father: Yunlu
- Mother: Lady Li

Hongpu (弘普; 9 August 1713 – 16 April 1743) was Qing dynasty imperial peer prince and second son of Yunlu, Prince Zhuang Ke of the First Rank. Although he never held a title of the prince of the first rank, his eldest son was selected to succeed the Prince Zhuang peerage.

== Life ==
Hongpu was born on 9 August 1713 to secondary princess consort Zhuangke of the First Rank, lady Li. He had two biological brothers, Honghao and Hongming. In 1723, Hongpu's father, Yunlu, was adopted into the Prince Zhuang peerage after the death of Boggodo, Šose's eldest son. In 1736, Hongpu was granted a title of the prince of the fourth rank by his paternal cousin.

In 1739, second Prince Li of the First Rank, Hongxi, was accused of rebellion. While Qianlong Emperor was staying in the Chengde Mountain Resort, Hongpu sent his people to report an urgent secret matter, but was arrested at the High Copper Wall. After the return from the imperial hunt, Hongpu was demoted to grace defender duke. In the following year, he was designated as a right vice director of the Imperial Clan Court. Hongpu died in 1743 and was posthumously honoured as Hereditary Prince Gongqin (恭勤世子, "gongqin" meaning "respectful and diligent") and was later posthumously promoted to Prince Zhuang of the First Rank.

== Family ==
- Primary consort, of the Hurha clan (虎尔哈氏)
  贝子夫人-->奉恩镇国公夫人...恭勤世子福晋-->庄亲王福晋
- Secondary consort, of the Guo clan (郭氏)
  - Prince Zhuangshen of the First Rank Yongchang (1737-1788), first son
  - General of the third rank Yongke (1738-1794), second son
  - Yongjian (永坚; 1741-1765), third son
- Mistress, of the Zhou clan (周氏)
