= Yunki =

Chinese prince of the Qing Dynasty

Yunqi 允祺
- Prince Heng of the First Rank (和碩恆親王)

Prince Heng of the First Rank
- Tenure: 22 November 1709 – 10 July 1732
- Predecessor: Title created
- Successor: Hongzhi
- Born: Aisin Gioro Yinqi (愛新覺羅·胤祺); 5 January 1680
- Died: 10 July 1732 (aged 52)
- Consorts: Lady Tatara; Lady Fuca
- Issue: 7 sons 6 daughters
Names
- Aisin Gioro Yunqi (愛新覺羅·允祺)
Posthumous name
- Prince Hengwen of the First Rank (恆溫親王)
- House: Aisin Gioro
- Father: Kangxi Emperor
- Mother: Consort Yi

Yunqi (Manchu: ᠶᡡᠨ ᡴᡳ, romanized: yūn ki, Chinese: 允祺; pinyin: Yǔnqí; 5 January 1680 – 10 July 1732), born Yinqi and formally known as Prince Heng of the First Rank, was an imperial prince of the Manchu ruled Qing dynasty. He was the fifth son of the Kangxi Emperor who survived to adulthood.

== Life ==
Yinqi was born on 5 January 1680 to Lady Gorolo, Concubine Yi (宜嬪). Yinqi was raised by his grandmother, Empress Xiaohuizhang, and did not participate in the battle to be Kangxi's successor.

In 1696, the Kangxi Emperor ordered Yinqi to lead the Plain Yellow Banners troops against Dzungar Khanate ruled by Galdan Boshugtu Khan. The battle ended with a Qing victory.

In 1709, Yinqi was granted the title of Prince Heng of the First Rank (恒親王). In 1719, he designed his eldest son, Hongsheng (弘昇; 1696–1754), as his heir. Hongsheng was stripped of his titles in 1727 because of his inability to deal with official affairs.

He changed his name to Yunqi when Yinzhen became emperor.

Yunqi died on 10 July 1732 and was posthumously awarded with the title of Prince Hengwen of the First Rank (恒温亲王).The princedom of Yunqi was inherited by his second son, Hongzhi.

Yunqi's Mansion is located near the Shichahai neighborhood in central Beijing. In present the residence in known as Prince Chun Mansion.

== Family ==
Primary Consort

- First Primary Consort, of the Tatara clan (嫡福晉 他塔喇氏)
- Second Primary Consort, of the Fuca clan (嫡福晉 富察氏)

Secondary Consort

- Secondary Consort, of the Liugiya clan (側福晉 劉佳氏)
  - Hongsheng, Prince Gongke of the Third Rank (恭恪貝勒 弘昇; 6 May 1696 – 13 May 1754), 1st son
  - Princess of the Third Rank (27 October 1698 – 11 November 1759), 1st daughter
    - Married Namusai (纳穆塞) of the Khalkha Ulangagimot clan (喀尔喀 乌梁海济勒默氏)
- Secondary Consort, of the Gūwalgiya clan ( 側福晉瓜爾佳氏)
  - Hongzhi, Prince Hengke of the First Rank (恆恪親王 弘晊; 26 August 1700 – 3 July 1775), second son
  - Third son (7 October 1702 – 29 August 1707)
  - Hong'ang, Hereditary General of the First Rank (鎭国将军 弘昂; 25 April 1705 – 26 January 1782), fourth son
  - Fifth son (10 July 1707 – 15 July 1707)
  - Fifth daughter (23 October 1708 – April/May 1710)

Concubine

- Mistress, of the Magiya clan (庶妃 馬佳氏)
  - Princess of the Third Rank (10 November 1699 – 7 April 1743), 2nd daughter
    - Married Tserengwangbu (策凌旺布) Oirat Chuoluosi clan (绰罗斯氏) in 1719
  - Lady of the Second Rank (12 January 1703 – 13 July 1724), 3rd daughter
    - Married Dachong'a (达冲阿) of the Sakda clan in 1721
  - Lady of the Second Rank (23 December 1705 – 23 June 1784), 4th daughter
    - Married Junxibandi (郡錫班第) of the Khorchin Borjigin in 1735
- Mistress, of the Bai clan (庶妃 白氏)
- Mistress, of the Qian clan (庶妃 錢氏)
  - Hongxu, Hereditary General of the Fourth Rank (奉恩将军 弘昫; 8 November 1710 – 13 September 1753), 6th son
  - Hongtong, Hereditary General of the Fourth Rank (奉恩将军 弘曈; 3 November 1711 – 22 March 1754), 7th son
- Mistress, of the Zhang clan (庶妃 張氏)
  - Sixth Daughter (16 September 1711 – 17 November 1744)
    - Married Sumadi (蘇馬第) of the Dun'erluosi Borjigin (敦尔罗斯博尔济吉特氏) in 1738

== See also ==
- Royal and noble ranks of the Qing dynasty
- Ranks of imperial consorts in China#Qing
