= Prince Hui (second rank) =

Prince Hui of the Second Rank
- Traditional Chinese: 多羅惠郡王
- Simplified Chinese: 多罗惠郡王
Transcriptions
Standard Mandarin
- Hanyu Pinyin: duōluó huì jùnwáng
- Wade–Giles: to-lo hui chün-wang

Prince Hui of the Second Rank, or simply Prince Hui, was the title of a princely peerage used in China during the Manchu-led Qing dynasty (1644–1912). As the Prince Hui peerage was not awarded "iron-cap" status, this meant that each successive bearer of the title would normally start off with a title downgraded by one rank vis-à-vis that held by his predecessor. However, the title would generally not be downgraded to any lower than a feng'en fuguo gong except under special circumstances.

The first bearer of the title was Bo'erguoluo (博爾果洛), Šose's second son and a great-grandson of Nurhaci (the founder of the Qing dynasty). In 1665, Bo'erguoluo was granted the title "Prince Hui of the Second Rank" by the Kangxi Emperor. The title was passed down over four generations and held by three persons.

== Members of the Prince Hui peerage ==
Members of the Prince Hui peerage
- Bo'erguoluo (博爾果洛; 1651–1712), Šose's second son, held the title Prince Hui of the Second Rank from 1665 to 1684, stripped of his title in 1684
  - Fucang (福蒼), Bo'erguoluo's fifth son, posthumously honoured as a beile in 1750
    - Qiulin (球琳), Fucang's eldest son, held the title of a junwang from 1728 to 1746, demoted to beile in 1746, stripped of his title in 1757
      - Dejin (德謹), Qiulin's second son, held the title of a feng'en fuguo gong from 1758 to 1763, stripped of his title in 1763
      - Dechun (德春), Qiulin's third son, held the title of a third class zhenguo jiangjun from 1764 to 1765
      - Desan (德三), Qiulin's fourth son, held the title of a third class fuguo jiangjun from 1768 to 1791
        - Tuyi (徙義), Desan's eldest son, held the title of a fengguo jiangjun from 1792 to 1806, stripped of his title in 1806
  - Yitai (伊泰), Bo'erguoluo's son
    - Minghe (明赫), Yitai's son, held the title of a feng'en zhenguo gong from 1737 to 1739, stripped of his title in 1739
      - Sule (素勒), Minghe's son
        - Wanxiang (萬祥), Sule's second son, held the title of a feng'en jiangjun from 1806 to 1835
          - Henglin (亨麟), Wanxiang's second son, held the title of a feng'en jiangjun from 1835 to 1874
            - Yingcui (英萃), Henglin's son
              - Zhongduan (中端), Yingcui's son, held the title of a feng'en jiangjun from 1874 to 1888
            - Yingmao (英茂), Henglin's third son, held the title of a feng'en jiangjun from 1888
        - Wancheng (萬成), Sule's son
          - Hengjie (亨傑), Wancheng's son
            - Yingqin (英芹), Hengjie's son
              - Dingyan (定埏), Yingqin's second son, held the title of a feng'en jiangjun

== Family tree ==
Family of Prince Hui (second rank)

Šose 碩塞 (1629–1655); Prince Chengzeyu 承澤裕親王 (1644–1655)
Bo'erguoluo 博爾果洛 (1651–1712); Prince Hui of the Second Rank 惠郡王 (1665–1684) (stripped of his title)
Yitai 伊泰	Fucang 福蒼; Beile 貝勒 (posthumously awarded)
Minghe 明赫; Feng'en Zhenguo Gong 奉恩鎮國公 (1737–1739)	Qiulin 球琳; Beile 貝勒 (1746–1757) (stripped of his title)
Sule 素勒	Desan 德三; Third Class Fuguo Jiangjun 三等輔國將軍 (1768–1791)	Dejin 德謹; Feng'en Fuguo Gong 奉恩輔國公 (1758–1763)	Dechun 德春; Third Class Zhenguo Jiangjun 三等鎮國將軍 (1764–1765)
Wancheng 萬成	Wanxiang 萬祥; Feng'en Jiangjun 奉恩將軍 (1806–1835)	Tuyi 徙義; Fengguo Jiangjun 奉國將軍 (1792–1806)
Hengjie 亨傑	Henglin 亨麟; Feng'en Jiangjun 奉恩將軍 (1835–1874)
Yingqin 英芹	Yingmao 英茂; Feng'en Jiangjun 奉恩將軍 (1888–?)	Yingcui 英萃
Dingyan 定埏; Feng'en Jiangjun 奉恩將軍	Zhongduan 中端; Feng'en Jiangjun 奉恩將軍 (1874–1888)

== See also ==
- Prince Zhuang
- Royal and noble ranks of the Qing dynasty
