= Gorolo =

Manchu clan and family name

Chinese name
- Chinese: 郭络罗氏
Transcriptions
Standard Mandarin
- Hanyu Pinyin: guō luò luó shì

Manchu name
- Manchu script: ᡤᠣᡵᠣᠯᠣ
- Möllendorff: Gorolo

Pronunciation respelling name
- Pronunciation respelling: GOH-roh-loh

Gorolo is a clan of Manchu clan and family name.

== Notable figures ==
=== Males ===
- Antamu (安塔穆)
  - Sanguanbao (三官保), served as third rank literary official (侍郎)
    - Daobao (道保), served as second rank military official (副都统)
    - Duopuku (多普库), served as fourth rank military official (左领)
    - Tepuku (特普库), served as fourth rank military official (左领)
    - Epuku (鄂普库), served as fifth rank literary official (郎中)
    - Tapuku (他普库)
    - Jinengte (及能特)

Prince Consorts

Year	Princess	Prince Consort	Sons	Daughters
1585	Princess of the Second Rank (和硕公主)	Yangšu (揚書)	three sons, including Darhan	
	Princess of the Second Rank, Yanzhe	Darhan (达尔汉)		

=== Females ===
Imperial Consort

- Consort
  - Consort Yi (1660–1733), the Kangxi Emperor's consort, the mother of Yunki (1680–1732), Yuntang (1683–1726) and Yinzi (1685–1696)
- Noble Lady
  - Noble Lady, the Kangxi Emperor's noble lady, the mother of Princess Kejing (1679–1735) and Yinju (1683–1684)

Princess Consort

- Primary Consort
  - Cuyen's first wife, the mother of Dudu (1597–1642) and Guohuan (1598–1624)
  - Yunsi's primary consort (d. 1726)
  - Yunlu's primary consort, the mother of first son (1712), Princess Duanrou (1714–1755), third son (1715), Hongshen (1717–1719), second daughter (1720–1721) and Princess (1723–1752)
- Concubine
  - Yun'e's concubine, the mother of first son (1701), Hongxu (1703–1708), third son (1704–1709), first daughter (1706–1743) and Hongjun (1711–1771)
