= Zaixun, Prince Zhuang =

Zaixun
- Prince Zhuang of the First Rank
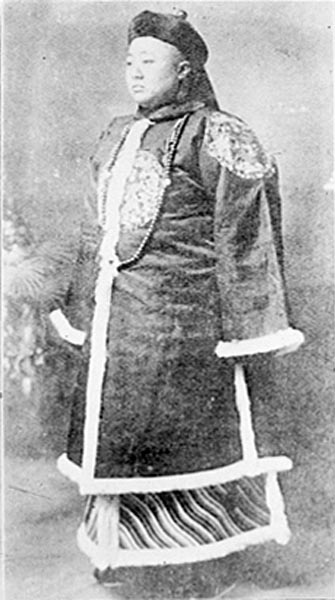
- Zaixun

Prince Zhuang of the First Rank
- Tenure: 1875 – 21 February 1901
- Predecessor: Yiren
- Successor: Zaigong
- Born: 24 January 1854; Beijing, China
- Died: 21 February 1901 (aged 48); Yongji, Shanxi, China
- House: Aisin Gioro
- Father: Yiren
- Military career
- Allegiance: Qing Dynasty
- Conflicts: Boxer Rebellion

Zaixun
- Traditional Chinese: 載勛
- Simplified Chinese: 载勋
Transcriptions
Standard Mandarin
- Hanyu Pinyin: Zǎixūn

Prince Zhuang
- Traditional Chinese: 莊親王
- Simplified Chinese: 庄亲王
Transcriptions
Standard Mandarin
- Hanyu Pinyin: Zhuāng Qīnwáng

Zaixun (24 January 1854 – 21 February 1901), formally known as Prince Zhuang, was a Manchu prince of the Qing dynasty. He is best known for his involvement in the Boxer Rebellion.

== Life ==
Zaixun was born in the Aisin Gioro clan as the second son of Yiren (奕仁; 1824–1874), the ninth successor to the Prince Zhuang peerage, one of the 12 "iron-cap" princely peerages of the Qing dynasty. Born during the reign of the Xianfeng Emperor, Zaixun initially held the title of a fuguo gong. In 1875, during the reign of the Guangxu Emperor, he was promoted to qinwang (first-rank prince), and inherited the title "Prince Zhuang of the First Rank" (莊親王) from his father.

In 1900, Zaixun strongly advocated making use of the Righteous and Harmonious Society (or "Boxers") to counter foreign aggression. The following year, after Empress Dowager Cixi issued the Imperial Decree of declaration of war against foreign powers, war broke out between the Qing Empire and Eight-Nation Alliance, leading to the Boxer Rebellion. Zaixun and Gangyi were placed in command of Boxer groups to fight the foreigners. Zaixun had an altar set up in his residence, while he personally donned garments similar to those of the Boxers. Not long afterwards he was appointed as the Nine Gates Infantry Commander, and he gave out rewards for the capture and killing of foreigners. All the Boxers throughout China first gathered in Zaixun's residence after arriving in Beijing to receive their respective missions.

When Beijing fell to the Eight-Nation Alliance in 1900, Empress Dowager Cixi fled to Xi'an in western China. She was accompanied by Zaixun, who took on the post of Camp Inspecting Minister (查營大臣). 1,700 Boxers in Zaixun's residence were killed by foreign soldiers. During the negotiations for the Boxer Protocol, Zaixun was accused of being one of the masterminds of the Boxer Rebellion by the foreign powers. In 1901, he was impeached and stripped of his titles, and on February 21 he committed suicide by hanging himself in Puzhou (present-day Yongji, Shanxi).

Zaixun's residence previously belonged to Liu Jin, a court eunuch of the Ming dynasty. The house was destroyed when the armies of the Eight-Nation Alliance occupied Beijing. During the early Republican era, it was purchased by the warlord Li Chun (李純) and shifted to Tianjin, where a Li Family Shrine (now the Nankai Cultural Palace 南開文化宮) was built.

== Family ==
Consorts and issue:

- Primary consort, of the Wuliyahan clan, daughter of prince of the second rank Seboke Dorji
- Step consort, of the Magiya clan, daughter of Shaoqi
- Secondary consort, of the Huanggiya clan, daughter of Qiming
- Mistress, of the Huang clan, daughter of Huang Sheng
- Mistress, of the Song clan, daughter of Changming

Issue:

1. Pugang (溥纲), lesser bulwark duke
2. Puqi (溥绮)
3. Pushen (溥绅)
4. Puji (溥继)
5. Pujian (溥缄), a sixth rank literary official (笔贴式, pinyin:bitieshi)
6. Pujing (溥经), a sixth rank literary official (笔贴式)
7. Pushao (溥绍), a sixth rank literary official (笔贴式)

== See also ==
- Prince Zhuang
- Royal and noble ranks of the Qing dynasty
- Ranks of imperial consorts in China#Qing
