= Yuntang =

Manchu Prince

- Beizi
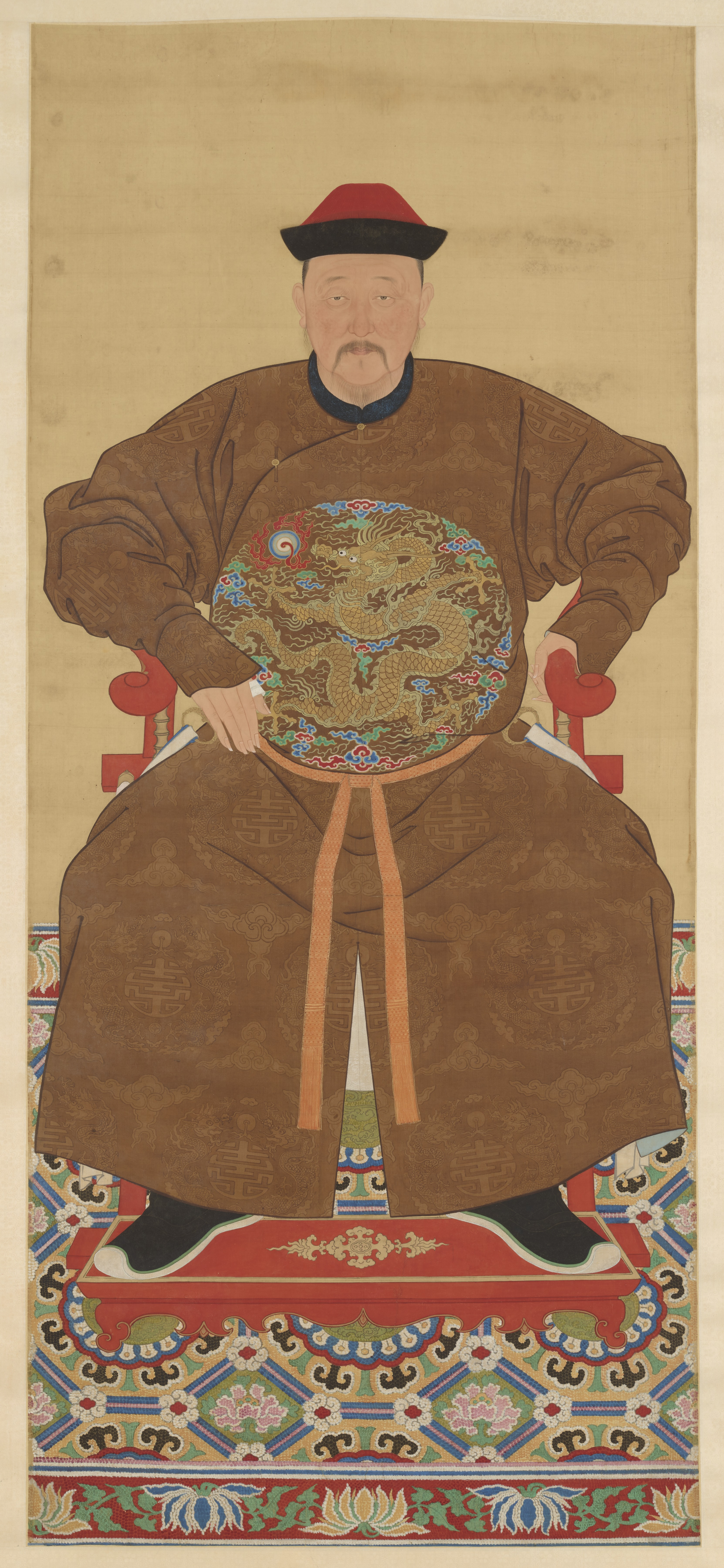
- Portrait of Yuntang

Beizi
- Tenure: 19 April 1709 – August 1725
- Born: Aisin Gioro Yintang (愛新覺羅·胤禟); 17 October 1683
- Died: 22 September 1726 (aged 42)
- Consorts: Lady Donggo
- Issue: Hongzheng; Hongzhang; Hongxiang; Hongkuang; Hongding; Dongxi; Sibao; Douxixin
Names
- Aisin Gioro Yuntang (愛新覺羅·允禟)
- House: Aisin Gioro
- Father: Kangxi Emperor
- Mother: Consort Yi

Yuntang

Chinese name
- Chinese: 允禟
Transcriptions
Standard Mandarin
- Hanyu Pinyin: Yǔntáng

Yintang
- Chinese: 胤禟
Transcriptions
Standard Mandarin
- Hanyu Pinyin: Yìntáng

Manchu name
- Manchu script: ᠶᡡᠨ ᡨᠠᠩ

Yuntang (17 October 1683 – 22 September 1726), born Yintang, was a Manchu prince of the Qing dynasty. He was the ninth son of the Kangxi Emperor and an ally of his eighth brother Yunsi, who was the main rival to their fourth brother Yinzhen in the power struggle over the succession. In 1722, Yinzhen succeeded their father and became historically known as the Yongzheng Emperor, after which he started purging his former rivals. In 1725, the Yongzheng Emperor stripped Yuntang off his beizi title, banished him from the Aisin Gioro clan, and imprisoned him in Baoding. Yuntang died under mysterious circumstances later. In 1778, the Qianlong Emperor, who succeeded the Yongzheng Emperor, posthumously restored him to the imperial clan.

== Life ==
Yintang was born in the Aisin Gioro clan as the ninth son of the Kangxi Emperor. His mother was Consort Yi (宜妃) from the Gorolo clan. He was not one of the Kangxi Emperor's favourite sons, but nonetheless managed to gain substantial wealth and influence among his brothers.

The Kangxi Emperor had designated his second oldest surviving son, Yinreng, as Crown Prince, but had also stripped Yinreng from his position twice due to Yinreng's arrogance and violent behaviour. During that two periods of time when the position of Crown Prince was vacant, Yintang supported his eighth brother, Yinsi, in his bid to secure that position, but Yinsi did not succeed both times. The Kangxi Emperor eventually decided to secretly designate an heir apparent, whose identity would only be revealed after his death.

In 1722, after the Kangxi Emperor died, his fourth son, Yinzhen, was revealed to be his chosen successor. Yinzhen ascended the throne and became historically known as the Yongzheng Emperor. Yintang and all his brothers had to change the character Yin (胤) in their names to Yun (允) to avoid naming taboo, because the reigning emperor's name also contained the character Yin. In the same year, Yuntang was sent to the military garrison at Xining and placed under the supervision of the general Nian Gengyao.

Three years later, in 1725, the Yongzheng Emperor stripped Yuntang off his beizi title, banished him from the Aisin Gioro clan, and forced him to change his name to "Seshe" (Manchu: ᠰᡝᠰᡥᡝ; Chinese: 塞思黑; pinyin: Sàisīhēi). His eight sons were forced to change their name to Fusihūn, (Note: "humble") Facuhūn, (Note: "rebel" or "unworthy") Ubiyada, (Note: "hateful") Eimede, (Note: "tyrannical, oppressive to others") Hairakan, (Note: "pitiful") Dungki, (Note: "lazy") Dusihiyen (Note: "silly") and Eihun (Note: "daft", "dumb") respectively.

Yuntang reportedly pleaded with the emperor to send him to a Buddhist monastery and allow him to spend the rest of his life as a monk, but the emperor refused. Yuntang was later imprisoned in Baoding. He died from an unspecified "abdominal illness". However, there are speculations that Yuntang died from poisoning.

Yuntang's sons were rehabilitated by the Qianlong Emperor, who had succeeded the Yongzheng Emperor in 1735. In 1778, Yuntang was posthumously restored to the imperial clan and had his name changed back from "Seshe" to "Yuntang". However Yuntang was neither rehabilitated nor had his title restored.

=== Meaning of "Seshe" ===
"Sàisīhēi" is a Chinese transliterating words of a Manchu term which has traditionally been translated as "dog" in Chinese. However it is a false rumour. According to Hetu Dangse (Chinese: 黑圖檔), a thematic archive of historical documents from the Qing Dynasty now preserved in the Archives of Liaoning Province (辽宁省档案馆), the original term is "Seshe" (ᠰᡝᠰᡥᡝ). There is some dispute as to whether that is an accurate translation. Some scholars suggest "Seshe" actually means "to tremble", or "annoying person".

== Legacy ==
Yuntang has been viewed as a pioneer in the romanisation of the Manchu language. He was known to have had ties with the Portuguese missionary Joannes Mourão (穆景遠). Mourão allegedly introduced Yuntang to literature written in the Latin alphabet, which allowed Yuntang to establish a basic Manchu romanisation system around 1723, supposedly as a secret code for communication between himself and other supporters of Yunsi.

While Paul Georg von Möllendorff's Möllendorff system is often seen as the first Manchu transliteration system, Yuntang's system predates Möllendorff's by over 150 years.

== Family ==
Primary Consort

- Primary consort, of the Donggo clan (嫡福晉 董鄂氏)
  - Fourth daughter (12 September 1705 – December 1726 or January 1727)
    - Married Zhao Shiyang (趙世揚) in 1721

Concubine

- Mistress, of the Wanggiya clan (完顏氏)
  - First daughter (10 December 1701 – 16 August 1725)
    - Married Sevdenvanbu (Сэвдэнванбу, 色卜騰旺布) of the Oirat Choros clan in August/September 1718
  - Lady of the First Rank (郡君; 14 July 1704 – February/March 1727), third daughter
    - Married Yongfu (永福) of the Manchu Yehe Nara clan in March/April 1720
  - Hongding (弘鼎; 19 December 1711 – 28 November 1782), fifth son
- Mistress, of the Zhao clan (兆氏)
  - Second daughter (20 January 1703 – May/June 1741)
    - Married Khambu (Хамбу, 侃布) of the Barin Borjigit clan in June/July 1719
  - Fifth daughter (21 August 1706 – 6 October 1742)
    - Married Sevden (Сэвдэн, 色卜騰) in August/September 1739
  - Hongxiang (弘相; 20 February 1710 – 21 April 1739), third son
- Mistress, of the Liu clan (劉氏)
  - Hongzheng (弘晸; 12 December 1706 – 26 December 1787), first son
  - Hongzhang (弘暲; 29 March 1709 – 4 July 1756), second son
- Mistress, of the Lang clan (郎氏)
  - Hongkuang (弘曠; 15 December 1711 – 20 February 1737), fourth son
- Mistress, of the Chen clan (陳氏)
  - Sixth daughter (8 July 1719 – 10 December 1767)
- Mistress, of the Zhu clan (朱氏)
  - Dongxi (棟喜; 24 July 1719 – 19 January 1791), sixth son
- Mistress, of the Zhou clan (周氏)
  - Sibao (四保; 22 October 1719 – 12 April 1771), seventh son
  - Douxixin (都錫欣; 3 December 1720 – 25 October 1775), eighth son

== In fiction and popular culture ==
- Portrayed by Cheung Wai in The Rise and Fall of Qing Dynasty (1988)
- Portrayed by Miao Haizhong in Yongzheng Dynasty (1999)
- Portrayed by Ma Wenlong in Palace (2011)
- Portrayed by Han Dong in Scarlet Heart (2011)
- Portrayed by Zhu Zixiao in The Palace (2013)
- Portrayed by Derek Wong in Gilded Chopsticks (2014)
- Liu Dekai as Yu Wanting / Yintang in The Book and the Sword (2008 TV series)

== See also ==
- Royal and noble ranks of the Qing dynasty
- Ranks of imperial consorts in China § Qing
