= Yinlu Foods =

Chinese food and drink company

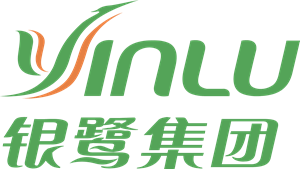
- Industry: Food manufacturing
- Revenue: US$812 million (2010)
- Owner: Nestlé (60%)
- Number of employees: over 10,000 (2012)

Yinlu Foods (Chinese: 银鹭食品集团; lit. 'Silver Heron Food Group') is a Chinese company, specializing in manufacturing processed and prepared foods and beverages. In 2011, Nestlé purchased 60% of Yinlu Foods, and became the parent company and main shareholder.

In 2012, the company employed more than 10,000 people at three factories, and was constructing two more. Its 2010 revenues were equivalent to US$812 million.
