= Boggodo =

- Prince Zhuang of the First Rank 和碩莊親王
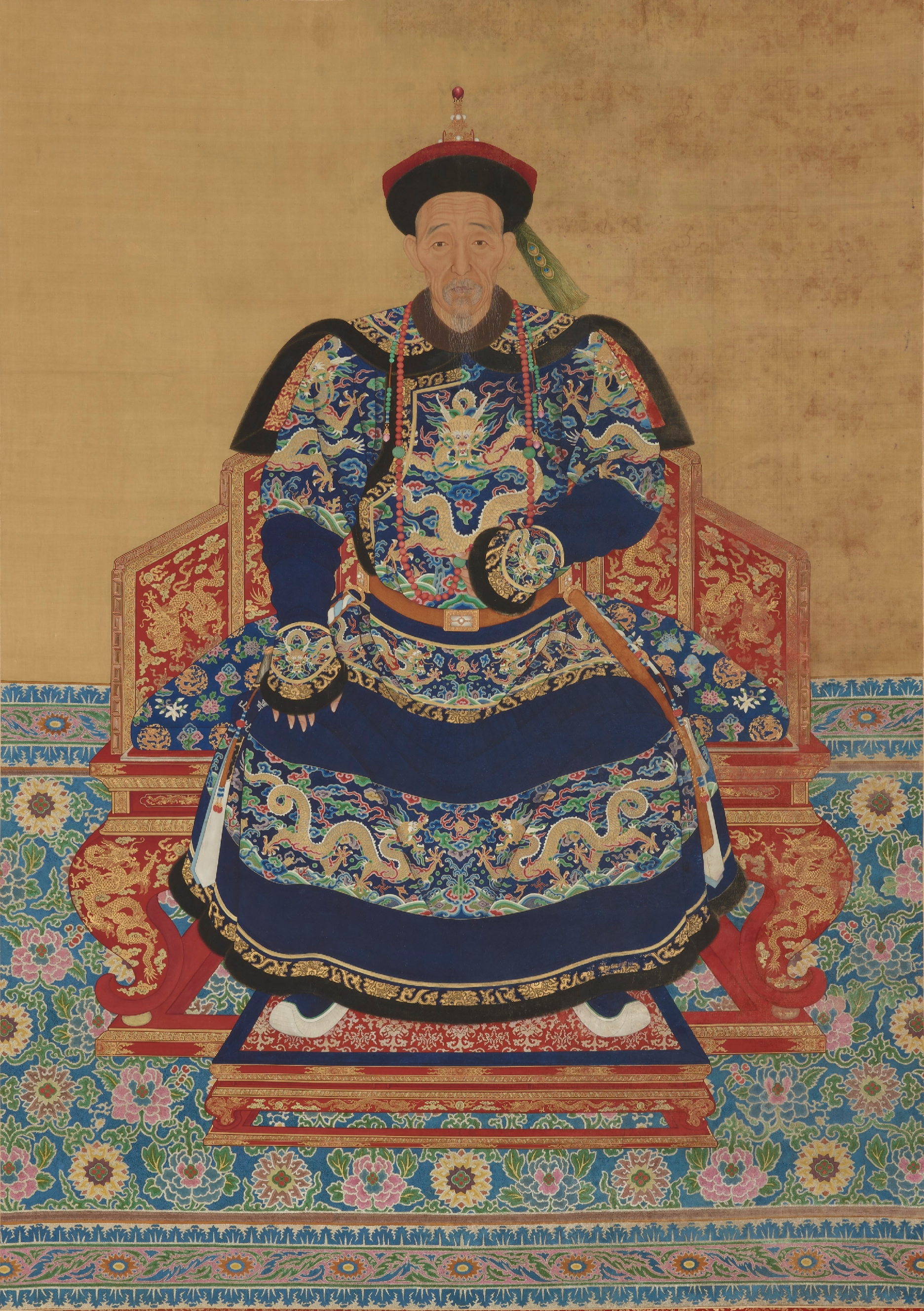

Prince Zhuang of the First Rank
- Tenure: 12 January 1655 – 15 February 1723
- Predecessor: Šose
- Successor: Yunlu
- Born: 22 April 1650
- Died: 15 February 1723 (aged 72)
- Spouse: Lady Borjigit
- Issue: Princess Daokexin of the Third Rank
Names
- Boggodo
Posthumous name
- Prince Zhuangjing of the First Rank (莊靖親王)
- Father: Šose
- Mother: Lady Nara

Boggodo (Chinese: 博果鐸, Manchu: ᠪᠣᡴᡩᠠ; 22 April 1650 –15 February 1723) was a member of Manchu Aisin Gioro clan, a grandson of Hong Taiji, the eldest son of the Prince Chengzeyu Šose and a paternal cousin of the Kangxi Emperor.

== Life ==
Boggodo was born on 22 April 1650 to Šose's primary consort, lady Nara. In 1655, he inherited the Prince Chengze peerage after his father's death under the name "Prince Zhuang of the First Rank" .

His second daughter, Daokexin, was raised in the imperial palace and granted a title of the Princess of the Third Rank. According to the tradition, a daughter of the imperial prince adopted into imperial household could receive a title of imperial princess (gongzhu). This honour was bestowed upon his adopted granddaughter, later known as Princess Duanrou of the Second Rank.

Boggodo died in 1723 and was posthumously honoured as Prince Zhuangjing of the First Rank (庄靖亲王, "zhuangjing" meaning "dignified and quiet"). He was succeeded by Yongzheng Emperor's half-brother, Yunlu, due to lack of a male heir.

== Family ==
- Primary consort, of the Chahar Borjigin clan, daughter of Abunai;
- Mistress of the Shi clan (庶福晋石氏), daughter of Shi Gui (石贵);
- Mistress, of the Zhang clan (庶福晋张氏), daughter of Zhang Wendi (张文第);
- Mistress, of the Zhou clan (庶福晋周氏), daughter of Zhou Da (周达).

=== Issue ===
- Adopted son: Prince Zhuangke of the First Rank (和硕庄恪亲王) Yunlu (允禄).
- First daughter
  - Married Namuzha of the Barin league
- Princess Daokexin of the Third Rank (道克欣郡主), second daughter by lady Borjigit
  - Married Abao, of the Alxa Borjigin clan before 1740 and had issue (three sons : Gumubuzao, Labucang Dorji and Larjiwang).
