= Prince Heng =

Prince Heng of the First Rank

Chinese name
- Traditional Chinese: 和碩恆親王
- Simplified Chinese: 和硕恒亲王
Transcriptions
Standard Mandarin
- Hanyu Pinyin: héshuò héng qīnwáng
- Wade–Giles: ho-shuo heng ch'in-wang

Manchu name
- Manchu script: ᡥᠣᡧᠣᡳ ᡨᠣᠮᠣᡥᠣᠩᡤᠣ ᠴᡳᠨ ᠸᠠᠩ
- Romanization: hošoi tomohonggo cin wang

Prince Heng of the First Rank, or simply Prince Heng, was the title of a princely peerage used in China during the Manchu-led Qing dynasty (1644–1912). As the Prince Heng peerage was not awarded "iron-cap" status, this meant that each successive bearer of the title would normally start off with a title downgraded by one rank vis-à-vis that held by his predecessor. However, the title would generally not be downgraded to any lower than a feng'en fuguo gong except under special circumstances.

The first bearer of the title was Yunqi (允祺; 1680–1732), the Kangxi Emperor's fifth son. He was granted the title "Prince Heng of the First Rank" by his father in 1709. The title was passed down over nine generations and held by 12 persons.

== Members of the Prince Heng peerage ==
- Yunqi (允祺; 1680–1732), the Kangxi Emperor's fifth son, initially a beile from 1698 to 1709, promoted to Prince Heng of the First Rank in 1709, posthumously honoured as Prince Hengwen of the First Rank (恆溫親王)
  - Hongzhi (弘晊; 1700–1775), Yunqi's second son, initially a feng'en fuguo gong, promoted to feng'en zhenguo gong in 1727 and then to Prince Heng of the First Rank in 1732, posthumously honoured as Prince Hengke of the First Rank (恆恪親王)
    - Yonghao (永皓; 1755–1788), Hongzhi's tenth son, held the title Prince Heng of the Second Rank from 1775 to 1788, posthumously honoured as Prince Hengjing of the Second Rank (恆敬郡王)
  - Hongsheng (弘昇; 1696–1754), Yunqi's eldest son, held the title Prince Heng of the First Rank from 1720 to 1727, stripped of his title in 1727, posthumously honoured as a beile under the title Gongke Beile (恭恪貝勒) in 1754
    - Yongze (永澤; 1741–1810), Hongsheng's third son, held the title of a buru bafen fuguo gong from 1775 to 1790, promoted to beizi in 1790
      - Mianjiang (綿疆; 1777–1811), Yongze's third son, held the title of a third class zhenguo jiangjun from 1799 to 1810, promoted to feng'en zhenguo gong in 1810
        - Yikui (奕奎; 1803–1841), Miansong's second son and Mianjiang's adoptive son, held the title of a feng'en zhenguo gong from 1811 to 1835, stripped of his title in 1835
      - Miansong (綿崧; 1780–1837), Yongze's fourth son, held the title of a first class fuguo jiangjun from 1799 to 1835, promoted to feng'en fuguo gong in 1835
    - Yongxun (永勳; 1738–1786), Hongzhi's third son, held the title of a second class fengguo jiangjun from 1765 to 1781
      - Mianguo (綿果), Yongxun's fourth son, held the title of a feng'en jiangjun from 1781 to 1816
        - Yizheng (奕徵), Mianguo's eldest son, held the title of a feng'en jiangjun from 1819 to 1849, had no male heir
      - Mianhuai (綿懷; 1770–1814), Yongxun's son and Yonghao's adoptive son
        - Yili (奕禮; 1792–1849), Mianhuai's eldest son, held the title of a feng'en fuguo gong from 1839 to 1849
          - Zaifu (載茯; 1809–1862), Yili's eldest son, held the title of a second class fuguo jiangjun from 1839 to 1850, promoted to feng'en fuguo gong in 1849
            - Puquan (溥泉; 1836–1864), Zaifu's eldest son, held the title of a buru bafen fuguo gong from 1863 to 1864
              - Yusen (毓森; 1860–?), Puquan's eldest son, held the title of a buru bafen fuguo gong from 1865
                - Henggui (恆溎; 1911–?), Yusen's second son, held the title of a buru bafen fuguo gong
          - Zaimao (載茂), Yili's third son, held the title of a first class fengguo jiangjun from 1844 to 1858
            - Pujing (溥鏡), Zaimao's eldest son, held the title of a feng'en jiangjun from 1858 to 1866, stripped of his title in 1866
  - Hong'ang (弘昂; 1705–1782), Yunqi's fourth son, held the title of a first class zhenguo jiangjun from 1725 to 1775, stripped of his title in 1775
  - Hongxu (弘昫; 1710–1753), Yunqi's sixth son, held the title of a feng'en jiangjun from 1735 to 1740
    - Yongqing (永慶), Hongxu's second son, held the title of a feng'en jiangjun from 1740 to 1777
      - Mianzhang (綿彰), Yongqing's eldest son, held the title of a feng'en jiangjun from 1777 to 1810
  - Hongtong (弘曈; 1711–1754), Yunqi's seventh son, held the title of a feng'en jiangjun from 1735 to 1741
    - Yongnai (永鼐), Hongtong's second son, held the title of a feng'en jiangjun in 1741
    - Yongchun (永春), Hongtong's eldest son, held the title of a feng'en jiangjun from 1741 to 1758
      - Miangang (綿綱), Yongchun's eldest son, held the title of a feng'en jiangjun from 1759 to 1760, stripped of his title in 1760
    - Yongxin (永馨), Hongzhi's eldest son, held the title of a second class fuguo jiangjun from 1756 to 1760
      - Mianquan (綿銓), Yongxin's eldest son, held the title of a third class fengguo jiangjun from 1761 to 1775, stripped of his title in 1775

== Family tree ==
adoption
Yunqi 允祺 (1680–1732); Prince Hengwen of the First Rank 恆溫親王 (1709–1732)
Hongsheng 弘昇 (1696–1754); Gongke Beile 恭恪貝勒 (posthumously awarded)	Hongzhi 弘晊 (1700–1775); Prince Hengke of the First Rank 恆恪親王 (1732–1775)
Yongze 永澤 (1741–1810); Beizi 貝子 (1790–1810)	Yongxun 永勳 (1738–1786); Second Class Fengguo Jiangjun 二等奉國將軍 (1765–1781)	Yonghao 永皓 (1755–1788); Prince Hengjing of the Second Rank 恆敬郡王 (1775–1788)
Mianjiang 綿疆 (1777–1811); Feng'en Zhenguo Gong 奉恩鎮國公 (1810–1811)	Miansong 綿崧 (1780–1837); Feng'en Fuguo Gong 奉恩輔國公 (1835–1837)	Mianhuai 綿懷 (1770–1814)
Yikui 奕奎 (1803–1841); Feng'en Zhenguo Gong 奉恩鎮國公 (1811–1835) (stripped of his title)	Yili 奕禮 (1792–1849); Feng'en Fuguo Gong 奉恩輔國公 (1839–1849)
Zaifu 載茯 (1809–1862); Feng'en Fuguo Gong 奉恩輔國公 (1849–1862)
Puquan 溥泉 (1836–1864); Buru Bafen Fuguo Gong 不入八分輔國公 (1863–1864)
Yusen 毓森 (1860–?); Buru Bafen Fuguo Gong 不入八分輔國公 (1865–?)
Henggui 恆溎 (1911–?); Buru Bafen Fuguo Gong 不入八分輔國公

== See also ==
- Royal and noble ranks of the Qing dynasty
