= Prince Zhuang =

Prince Zhuang of the First Rank
- Traditional Chinese: 和碩莊親王
- Simplified Chinese: 和硕庄亲王
Transcriptions
Standard Mandarin
- Hanyu Pinyin: héshuò zhuāng qīnwáng
- Wade–Giles: ho-shuo chuang ch'in-wang

Prince Chengze of the First Rank
- Traditional Chinese: 和碩承澤親王
- Simplified Chinese: 和硕承泽亲王
Transcriptions
Standard Mandarin
- Hanyu Pinyin: héshuò chéngzé qīnwáng
- Wade–Giles: ho-shuo ch'eng-tse ch'in-wang

Prince Zhuang of the First Rank (Manchu: ᡥᠣᡧᠣᡳ
ᠨᡤᠠᠮᠪᠠᠯᡳᠩᡤᡡ
ᠴᡳᠨ ᠸᠠᠩ; hošoi ambalinggū cin wang), or simply Prince Zhuang, was the title of a princely peerage used in China during the Manchu-led Qing dynasty (1644–1912). It was also one of the 12 "iron-cap" princely peerages in the Qing dynasty, which meant that the title could be passed down without being downgraded.

The first bearer of the title was Šose (1629–1655), the fifth son of Hong Taiji, the second ruler of the Qing dynasty. He was awarded the title Prince Chengze of the First Rank (Manchu: ᡥᠣᡧᠣᡳ
ᡴᡝᠰᡳᠨᡤᡤᡝ
ᠴᡳᠨ ᠸᠠᠩ; hošoi kesingge cin wang; Prince Chengze) in 1651 by his father. The peerage was renamed to "Prince Zhuang of the First Rank" when it was passed down to Šose's eldest son, Boguoduo (博果鐸; 1650–1723). In 1723, by decree of the Yongzheng Emperor, the emperor's 16th brother, Yunlu (1695–1767), inherited the Prince Zhuang peerage from Boguoduo because Boguoduo had no son to succeed him. During the reign of the Qianlong Emperor, the peerage was granted "iron-cap" status, which meant that the subsequent bearers of the title would start as a qinwang (first-rank prince) by default. The peerage was passed down over nine generations and held by 12 persons.

The title "Prince Zhuang of the First Rank" was also awarded in 1653 by the Shunzhi Emperor as a posthumous title to Šurhaci (1564–1611), a younger brother of Nurhaci, the founder of the Qing dynasty.

== Members of the Prince Zhuang / Prince Chengze peerage ==
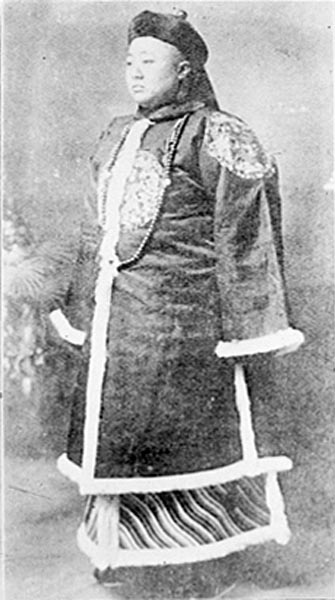
Zaixun (1853–1901), the tenth Prince Zhuang

Members of the Prince Zhuang / Prince Chengze peerage
- Šose (碩塞; 1629–1655), Hong Taiji's fifth son, held the title Prince Chengze of the Second Rank from 1644 to 1651, promoted to Prince Chengze of the First Rank in 1651, posthumously honoured as Prince Chengzeyu of the First Rank (承澤裕親王)
  - Boguoduo (博果鐸; 1650–1723), Šose's eldest son, held the title Prince Zhuang of the First Rank from 1655 to 1723, posthumously honoured as Prince Zhuangjing of the First Rank (莊靖親王)
    - Yunlu (允祿; 1695–1767), the Kangxi Emperor's 16th son and Boguoduo's adoptive son, held the title Prince Zhuang of the First Rank from 1723 to 1767, posthumously honoured as Prince Zhuangke of the First Rank (莊恪親王)
      - Hongpu (弘普; 1713–1743), Yunlu's second son, posthumously honoured as Prince Zhuang of the First Rank
        - Yongchang (永瑺; 1737–1788), Hongpu's son, held the title Prince Zhuang of the First Rank from 1767 to 1788, posthumously honoured as Prince Zhuangshen of the First Rank (莊慎親王)
        - Yongke (永珂; 1738–1794), Hongpu's son, held the title of a third class fengguo jiangjun
          - Mianke (綿課; 1763–1826), Yongke's son and Yongchang's adoptive son, held the title Prince Zhuang of the First Rank from 1788 to 1826, posthumously honoured as Prince Zhuangxiang of the First Rank (莊襄親王)
            - Yimai (奕𧷨; 1814–1860), Mianke's 13th son, held the title Prince Zhuang of the First Rank from 1826 to 1838, stripped of his title in 1838
      - Hongrong (弘曧; 1737–1806), Yunlu's son, held the title of a feng'en fuguo gong
        - Yongfan (永蕃), Hongrong's son, held the title of a fuguo jiangjun
          - Mianhu (綿護; 1783–1842), Yongfan's eldest son, held the title Prince Zhuang of the First Rank from 1838 to 1842, posthumously honoured as Prince Zhuangqin of the First Rank (莊勤親王)
          - Mianhua (綿譁; 1785–1845), Yongfan's second son, held the title Prince Zhuang of the First Rank from 1842 to 1845, posthumously honoured as Prince Zhuangzhi of the First Rank (莊質親王)
            - Yiren (奕仁; 1824–1874), Mianhua's eldest son, held the title Prince Zhuang of the First Rank from 1846 to 1874, posthumously honoured as Prince Zhuanghou of the First Rank (莊厚親王)
              - Zaixun (1853–1901), Yiren's second son, held the title Prince Zhuang of the First Rank from 1875 to 1901, stripped of his title in 1901
              - Zaigong (載功l 1859–1915), Yiren's fourth son, held the title Prince Zhuang of the First Rank from 1902 to 1915, posthumously honoured as Prince Zhuanggong of the First Rank (莊恭親王載功)
                - Puxu (溥緒; 1882–1933), Zaigong's son, held the title Prince Zhuang of the First Rank from 1916 to 1933

== Family tree ==
Family of Prince Zhuang

adoption
Hong Taiji 皇太極 (1592–1643) (r. 1626–1643)
Šose 碩塞 (1629–1655); Prince Chengzeyu 承澤裕親王 (1644–1655)	Fulin 福臨 (1638–1661); Shunzhi Emperor 順治帝 (1643–1661)
Boguoduo 博果鐸 (1650–1723); Prince Zhuangjing 莊靖親王 (1655–1723)	Xuanye 玄燁 (1654–1722); Kangxi Emperor 康熙帝 (1661–1722)
Yunlu 允祿 (1695–1767); Prince Zhuangke 莊恪親王 (1723–1767)
Hongpu 弘普 (1713–1743); Prince Zhuang 莊親王 (posthumously awarded)	Hongrong 弘曧 (1737–1806); Feng'en Fuguo Gong 奉恩輔國公
Yongchang 永瑺 (1737–1788); Prince Zhuangshen 莊慎親王 (1767–1788)	Yongke 永珂 (1738–1794); Third Class Fengguo Jiangjun 三等奉國將軍	Yongfan 永蕃; Fuguo Jiangjun 輔國將軍
Mianke 綿課 (1763–1826); Prince Zhuangxiang 莊襄親王 (1788–1826)	Mianhu 綿護 (1783–1842); Prince Zhuangqin 莊勤親王 (1838–1842)	Mianhua 綿譁 (1785–1845); Prince Zhuangzhi 莊質親王 (1842–1845)
Yimai 奕𧷨 (1814–1860); Prince Zhuang 莊親王 (1826–1838) (stripped of his title)	Yiren 奕仁 (1824–1874); Prince Zhuanghou 莊厚親王 (1846–1874)
Zaixun 載勛 (1853–1901); Prince Zhuang 莊親王 (1875–1901) (stripped of his title)	Zaigong 載功 (1859–1915); Prince Zhuanggong 莊恭親王 (1902–1915)
Puxu 溥緒 (1882–1933); Prince Zhuang 莊親王 (1916–1933)

== See also ==
- Prince Hui (second rank)
- Royal and noble ranks of the Qing dynasty
