= Imperial Clan Court =

Institution of the imperial family of the Ming and Qing dynasties

- Tông Nhân phủ ấn (宗人府印), the great seal of the Nguyễn dynasty's Imperial Clan Court.

Agency overview
- Formed: 1389
- Preceding agency: Office of the Imperial Clan (太宗正院)

Imperial Clan Court

Pre-Yuan
- Chinese: 宗正寺
Transcriptions
Standard Mandarin
- Hanyu Pinyin: Zōngzhèng Sì
- Wade–Giles: Tsung^{1}-cheng^{4} Ssu^{4}

Yuan
- Chinese: 太宗正院
Transcriptions
Standard Mandarin
- Hanyu Pinyin: Tài Zōngzhèng Yuàn
- Wade–Giles: T'ai Tsung-cheng Yüan

Ming & Qing
- Chinese: 宗人府
Transcriptions
Standard Mandarin
- Hanyu Pinyin: Zōngrén Fǔ
- Wade–Giles: Tsung^{1}-jen^{2} Fu^{3}

Vietnamese name
- Vietnamese alphabet: Tông Nhân phủ or Tôn Nhân phủ
- Hán-Nôm: 宗人府 or 尊人府

Manchu name
- Manchu script: ᡠᡴᡠᠨ ᠪᡝ ᡴᠠᡩᠠᠯᠠᡵᠠ ᠶᠠᠮᡠᠨ
- Möllendorff: uksun be kadalara yamun

The Imperial Clan Court or Court of the Imperial Clan was an institution responsible for all matters pertaining to the imperial family under the Ming and Qing dynasties of imperial China. This institution also existed under the Nguyễn dynasty of Vietnam where it managed matters pertaining to the Nguyễn Phúc clan.

Established in 1389 by the Hongwu Emperor, it was based on previous institutions like the "Court of the Imperial Clan" of the Tang and Song dynasties and the "Office of the Imperial Clan" of the Yuan dynasty. Under the Ming dynasty, the Court was managed by the Ministry of Rites; during the Qing, it was outside the regular bureaucracy. Under both dynasties, the Court was staffed by members of the imperial clan. Imperial clansmen who committed crimes were not tried through the regular legal system. Qing imperial clansmen were registered under the Eight Banners, but were still under the jurisdiction of the Imperial Clan Court. The Court used regular reports on births, marriages, and deaths to compile the genealogy of the imperial clan (玉牒, Yùdié). The imperial genealogy was revised 28 times during the Qing dynasty.

A memorial in Peking Gazette 1874 mentions:

The military authorities of the Amoor region report that a gioro (member of the Imperial lineage) named Che-ch'êng, alias Che-kwang, originally borne on the rolls of the blue banner at Peking, but without specific employ, who was transported into penal servitude at the Amoor in 1862, after being implicated in eight different cases of theft and burglary, has now made his escape from custody. Since his transportation, he has already committed the same offence on five occasions; and having been imprisoned lately on a charge of concerted robbery, he managed to break out of jail on the 24th September and get away. Reports have been sent concerning him to the Imperial Clan Court and the Board of Punishments.

== Bibliography ==
- Elliott, Mark C. (2001), The Manchu Way: The Eight Banners and Ethnic Identity in Late Imperial China, Stanford: Stanford University Press, ISBN 0-8047-3606-5.
- Elman, Benjamin A. (2000), A Cultural History of Civil Examinations in Late Imperial China, Berkeley and Los Angeles: University of California Press, ISBN 0-520-21509-5.
- Farmer, Edward L. (1995), Zhu Yuanzhang & Early Ming Legislation: The Reordering of Chinese Society following the Era of Mongol Rule, Leiden, New York, and Köln: E.J. Brill, ISBN 90-04-10391-0.
- Hucker, Charles O. (1985), A Dictionary of Official Titles in Imperial China, Stanford: Stanford University Press, ISBN 0-8047-1193-3.
- Hucker, Charles O. (1998), "Ming Government", in Denis Twitchett and Frederick W. Mote (ed.), The Cambridge History of China, Volume 8: The Ming Dynasty, 1368-1644, Part 2, Cambridge: Cambridge University Press, pp. 9–105, ISBN 0-521-24333-5.
- Lui, Adam Yuen-chong (1990), Ch'ing Institutions and Society, 1644-1795, Hong Kong: Centre of Asian Studies, University of Hong Kong.
- Rawski, Evelyn S. (1988), "The Imperial Way of Death: Ming and Ch'ing Emperors and Death Ritual", in James L. Watson and Evelyn S. Rawski (ed.), Death Ritual in Late Imperial and Modern China, Berkeley and Los Angeles: University of California Press, pp. 228–253, ISBN 0-520-06081-4.
- Rawski, Evelyn S. (1998), The Last Emperors: A Social History of Qing Imperial Institutions, Los Angeles and Berkeley: University of California Press, ISBN 0-520-21289-4.
- Rhoads, Edward J.M. (2000), Manchu & Han: Ethnic Relations and Political Power in Late Qing and Early Republican China, 1861-1928, Seattle and London: University of Washington Press, ISBN 0-295-97938-0.
- Wu, Silas H. L. (1970), Communication and Imperial Control in China: Evolution of the Palace Memorial System, 1693–1735, Cambridge: Harvard University Press, ISBN 0-674-14801-0.
