= Yunlu =

- Prince Zhuang of the First Rank

Prince Zhuang of the First Rank
- Tenure: March 1723 – 20 March 1767
- Predecessor: Boggodo
- Successor: Yongchang
- Born: Yinlu (胤祿); 28 July 1695
- Died: 20 March 1767 (aged 71)
- Consorts: Lady Gorolo (郭絡羅氏)
- Issue: Hongpu (弘普); Hongming (弘明); Hongrong (弘曧); Princess Duanrou of the Second Rank (和碩端柔公主); Princess of the Third Rank; Lady of the Third Rank; Princess of the Fourth Rank; Princess of the Fourth Rank; Princess of the Fourth Rank
Names
- Yunlu (允祿)
Posthumous name
- Prince Zhuangke of the First Rank (莊恪親王)
- House: Aisin Gioro
- Father: Kangxi Emperor
- Mother: Consort Shunyimi (順懿密妃)

Yunlu
- Traditional Chinese: 允祿
- Simplified Chinese: 允禄
Transcriptions
Standard Mandarin
- Hanyu Pinyin: Yǔnlù

Yinlu
- Traditional Chinese: 胤祿
- Simplified Chinese: 胤禄
Transcriptions
Standard Mandarin
- Hanyu Pinyin: Yìnlù

Yunlu (28 July 1695 – 20 March 1767), born Yinlu, art name Aiyue Zhuren (愛月主人), posthumous name Prince Zhuangke of the First Rank, was an imperial prince of the Qing dynasty of China. He was the 16th son of the Kangxi Emperor. He was good in mathematics and musical tuning.

When Boggodo died in 1723 without an heir. Yunlu was adopted as his heir and inherited his Prince Zhuang peerage. Yunlu was trusted by Yongzheng Emperor. In 1723, the Yongzheng Emperor became seriously ill, Yunlu was appointed as one of regents alongside Yunli, Ortai and Zhang Tingyu to assist the new Qianlong Emperor. However, when Hongxi was found guilty of rebellion in 1739, Yunlu was implicated in the case and stripped of his official position. He returned to politics and managed the Department of Sacrificial Rite Music (神樂署) in 1742, but was no longer trusted by the Qianlong Emperor. He died in 1767 and his princely title was inherited by his eldest grandson, Yongchang

== Family ==
Primary Consort

- Imperial Princess Consort Zhuangke, of the Gorolo clan (莊恪亲王妃 郭絡羅氏)
  Titles: Primary Consort of the Sixteenth Prince (十六王子福晋) → Princess Consort Zhuang of the First Rank (莊亲王妃) → Imperial Princess Consort Zhuangke of the First Rank (莊恪亲王妃)
  - First son (4 September 1712)
  - Princess Duanrou of the Second Rank (和碩端柔公主; 13 April 1714 – 23 January 1755), first daughter
    - Married Chimed Dorji (齊默特多爾濟; d. 1782) of the Khorchin Borjigit clan in January/February 1731
  - Third son (5 October 1715 – 16 October 1715)
  - Hongshen (弘慎; 5 March 1717 – 27 July 1719), fifth son
  - Second daughter (20 December 1720 – May/June 1721)
  - Princess of the Third Rank (郡主; 20 March 1723 – 29 May 1752), fourth daughter
    - Married Laxinamuzha'er (喇錫那木扎爾) of the Khorchin Borjigit clan in January/February 1743

Secondary Consort

- Secondary consort, of the Li clan (側福晉 李氏)
  - Hongpu, Prince Zhuang of the First Rank (莊親王 弘普; 9 August 1713 – 16 April 1743), second son
  - Honghao (弘皓; 7 February 1717 – 3 September 1718), fourth son
  - Hongming, General of the Second Rank (輔國將軍 弘明; 14 May 1719 – 10 June 1787), sixth son
- Secondary consort, of the Zhu clan (側福晉 朱氏)
  - Seventh son (15 November 1727 – 5 November 1728)
- Secondary consort, of the Xue clan (側福晉 薛氏)
  - Princess of the Fourth Rank (縣主; 24 November 1727 – 25 June 1790), sixth daughter
    - Married Tsewang Norbu (色旺諾爾布) of the Khorchin Borjigit clan in December 1739
  - Seventh daughter (23 May 1730 – 20 February 1749)
- Secondary consort, of the Wang clan (側福晉 王氏)
  - Princess of the Fourth Rank (縣主; 18 June 1733 – March/April 1802), eighth daughter
    - Married Luobocangduo'erji (羅蔔藏多爾濟) in November/December 1750
  - Princess of the Fourth Rank (縣主; 20 August 1734 – 3 November 1754), ninth daughter
    - Married Yuanlao (元勞) of the Manchu Tunggiya clan in April/May 1752
- Secondary consort, of the Zhang clan (側福晉 張氏)
  - Hongrong, Duke of the Second Rank (輔國公 弘曧; 4 August 1737 – 22 November 1806), eighth son
  - Hong'ai (弘曖; 3 March 1739 – 2 July 1744), ninth son
- Secondary consort, of the Hu clan (側福晉 胡氏)
  - Hongchen (弘晨; 3 June 1742 – 6 May 1743), tenth son

Concubine

- Mistress, of the Fuca clan (富察氏)
  - Third daughter (21 December 1721 – December 1722 or January 1723)
- Mistress, of the Wang clan (王氏)
  - Lady of the Third Rank (鄉君; 1 May 1725 – 11 April 1794), fifth daughter
    - Married Exin (鄂欣 ) of the Manchu Sirin Gioro (西林覺羅) clan in March/April 1742

== See also ==
- Prince Zhuang
- Royal and noble ranks of the Qing dynasty
- Ranks of imperial consorts in China#Qing
